= 2015–16 NOJHL season =

38th season of the NOJHL

- League: Northern Ontario Junior Hockey League
- Sport: Hockey
- Duration: September 11, 2015 – March 12, 2016
- Teams: 12
- Finals champions: Soo Thunderbirds

NOJHL seasons
- 2014–15 2016–17

The 2015–16 NOJHL season is the 38th season of the Northern Ontario Junior Hockey League (NOJHL).

In March 2016, the top teams of each division play for the Copeland-McNamara Trophy, the NOJHL championship. The winner of the Copeland-McNamara Trophy will compete in the Central Canadian Junior "A" championship, the Dudley Hewitt Cup. The Kirkland Lake Gold Miners will automatically compete in the Dudley Hewitt Cup as they are the host team for 2016. If successful against the winners of the Ontario Junior Hockey League and Superior International Junior Hockey League, the Cup champion would then move on to play in the Canadian Junior Hockey League championship, the 2016 Royal Bank Cup.

== Changes ==
- Abitibi Eskimos relocate to Timmins, Ontario and become the Timmins Rock.
- Mattawa Blackhawks relocate to Iroquois Falls, Ontario and become Iroquois Falls Eskis.
- Sudbury Nickel Barons relocate to Rayside-Balfour, Ontario and become Rayside-Balfour Canadians.
- French River Rapids of Noelville, Ontario are granted expansion.
- Espanola Express of Espanola, Ontario are granted expansion.
- Soo Eagles rejoin league from North American Hockey League.

== Standings ==
Final standings as of March 12, 2016.

East Division	GP	W	L	OTL	T	PTS	GF	GA
xy–Cochrane Crunch	54	40	10	2	2	84	298	169
x–Powassan Voodoos	54	40	10	3	1	84	278	137
x–Kirkland Lake Gold Miners	54	39	12	2	1	81	247	135
x–Timmins Rock	54	29	24	0	1	59	257	219
x–Iroquois Falls Eskis	54	15	39	0	0	30	163	310
French River Rapids	54	2	49	2	1	7	124	347
West Division	GP	W	L	OTL	T	PTS	GF	GA
xyz–Soo Thunderbirds	54	47	6	1	0	95	245	93
x–Elliot Lake Wildcats	54	35	12	5	2	77	232	142
x–Rayside-Balfour Canadians	54	28	25	1	0	57	229	208
x–Soo Eagles	54	22	30	0	2	46	182	197
x–Espanola Express	54	12	39	3	0	27	132	243
Blind River Beavers	54	10	40	4	0	24	139	326

x = clinched playoff berth; y = clinched division title; z = clinched league title

== 2016 Copeland-McNamara Trophy Playoffs ==
Opening Round
E4	Timmins	2
E5	Iroquois Falls	0
W4	Soo Eagles	2
W5	Espanola	0

Quarterfinals
E1	Cochrane	4
E4	Timmins	0
East Division
E2	Powassan	2
E3	Kirkland Lake	4
W2	Elliot Lake	4
W3	Rayside-Balfour	1
West Division
W1	Soo Thunderbirds	4
W4	Soo Eagles	0

Semifinals
E1	Cochrane	1
E3	Kirkland Lake	4
W1	Soo Thunderbirds	4
W2	Elliot Lake	1

McNamara Trophy Finals
E3	Kirkland Lake	0
W1	Soo Thunderbirds	4

Playoff results are listed on the official league website.

== 2016 Dudley Hewitt Cup Championship ==
Hosted by the Kirkland Lake Gold Miners in Kirkland Lake, Ontario.

== Awards ==
- Top Defenceman (NOJHL Award) - Kyle Fransen, Rayside-Balfour Canadians
- Most Improved (Gilles Laperriere Trophy) - Nathan Hebert, Soo Thunderbirds
- Top Defensive Forward (Mitch Tetreault Memorial Trophy) - Brett Jeffries, Soo Thunderbirds
- Team Goaltending (NOJHL Award) - Soo Thunderbirds
- Top GAA (Wayne Chase Memorial Award) - Brendon Gordon, Soo Thunderbirds
- Top Scorer (Jimmy Conners Memorial Trophy) - Brayden Stortz, Kirkland Lake Gold Miners
- Most Valuable Player (Carlo Catterello Trophy) - Hunter Atchison, Cochrane Crunch
- Top Rookie (John Grignon Trophy) - Bradley Chenier, Rayside-Balfour Canadians
- Most Gentlemanly Player (Onaping Falls Huskies Trophy) - Brennan Kelly, French River Rapids
- Top Team Player (NOJHL Trophy) - Hunter Atchison, Cochrane Crunch
- Scholastic Award (NOJHL Trophy) - Brandon Grandinetti, Soo Thunderbirds
- CJHL Scholastic Nominee Award - Brandon Grandinetti, Soo Thunderbirds
- Playoff's Most Valuable Player (NOJHL Trophy) - Michael Caruso, Soo Thunderbirds
- Coach of the Year (Mirl "Red" McCarthy Memorial Award) - Ryan Leonard, Cochrane Crunch
- Top Executive (Joe Drago Trophy) - Jim Bruce, Powassen Voodoos

== See also ==
- 2016 Royal Bank Cup
- Dudley Hewitt Cup
- List of NOJHL seasons
- Ontario Junior Hockey League
- Superior International Junior Hockey League
- Greater Ontario Junior Hockey League
- 2015 in ice hockey
- 2016 in ice hockey

Preceded by 2014–15 NOJHL season	NOJHL seasons	Succeeded by 2016–17 NOJHL season
