= 2014–15 NOJHL season =

- League: Northern Ontario Junior Hockey League
- Sport: Hockey
- Duration: September 3, 2014 – April 19, 2015
- Teams: 9
- Finals champions: Soo Thunderbirds

NOJHL seasons
- 2013–14 2015–16

The 2014–15 NOJHL season was the 37th season of the Northern Ontario Junior Hockey League (NOJHL). The nine teams of the NOJHL played 56-game schedules.

Come February, the top teams of each division will play down for the Copeland-McNamara Trophy, the NOJHL championship. The winner of the Copeland-McNamara Trophy will compete in the Central Canadian Junior "A" championship, the Dudley Hewitt Cup. If successful against the winners of the Ontario Junior Hockey League and Superior International Junior Hockey League, the champion would then move on to play in the Canadian Junior Hockey League championship, the 2015 Royal Bank Cup.

== Changes ==
- Elliot Lake Bobcats relocate to Cochrane, Ontario and become Cochrane Crunch.
- Espanola Rivermen leave league for CIHL.
- North Bay Trappers relocate to Mattawa, Ontario and become Mattawa Blackhawks.
- Elliot Lake Wildcats of Elliot Lake, Ontario are granted expansion.
- Powassan Voodoos of Powassan, Ontario are granted expansion.

== Final standings ==
Note: GP = Games played; W = Wins; L = Losses; OTL = Overtime losses; SL = Shootout losses; GF = Goals for; GA = Goals against; PTS = Points; x = clinched playoff berth; y = clinched division title; z = clinched conference title

East
Team	Centre	W–L–T–OTL	GF–GA	Points
Kirkland Lake Gold Miners	Kirkland Lake, Ontario	38–10–2–2	264–131	80
Cochrane Crunch	Cochrane, Ontario	29–21–0–2	226–188	60
Abitibi Eskimos	Iroquois Falls, Ontario	28–20–0–4	243–233	60
Powassan Voodoos	Powassan, Ontario	15–29–0–8	217–262	38
Mattawa Blackhawks	Mattawa, Ontario	14–34–0–4	171–304	32
West
Team	Centre	W–L–T–OTL	GF–GA	Points
Soo Thunderbirds	Sault Ste. Marie, Ontario	38–7–1–6	271–130	83
Elliot Lake Wildcats	Elliot Lake, Ontario	38–11–2–1	242–142	79
Sudbury Nickel Barons	Sudbury, Ontario	31–16–1–4	203–179	67
Blind River Beavers	Blind River, Ontario	0–51–0–1	98–366	1

Teams listed on the official league website.

Standings listed on official league website.

== 2015 Copeland-McNamara Trophy Playoffs ==
Play-in series
E4	Powassan	2
E5	Mattawa	0

Quarterfinals
E1	Kirkland Lake	2
E4	Powassan	4
E2	Cochrane	4
E3	Abitibi	2
W1	Soo	4
W4	Blind River	0
W2	Elliot Lake	4
W3	Sudbury	2

Semifinals
E4	Powassan	0
E2	Cochrane	4
W1	Soo	4
W2	Elliot Lake	1

Finals
W1	Soo	4
E2	Cochrane	1

Playoff results are listed on the official league website.

== 2015 Dudley Hewitt Cup Championship ==
Hosted by the Fort Frances Lakers of the Superior International Junior Hockey League in Fort Frances, Ontario. The Soo Thunderbirds represented the NOJHL and won the Dudley Hewitt Cup.

Round Robin

Soo Thunderbirds defeated Dryden Ice Dogs (SIJHL), 8-1
Soo Thunderbirds defeated Fort Frances Lakers (Host-SIJHL), 6-3
Toronto Patriots (OJHL) defeated Soo Thunderbirds, 4-3 OT

Championship Game

Soo Thunderbirds defeated Fort Frances Lakers, 3-2

== 2015 Royal Bank Cup ==
Round Robin

Carleton Place Canadians (CCHL) defeated Soo Thunderbirds, 4-0
Melfort Mustangs (SJHL) defeated Soo Thunderbirds, 5-3
Portage Terriers (MJHL) defeated Soo Thunderbirds, 7-2
Penticton Vees (BCHL) defeated Soo Thunderbirds, 5-2

== Awards ==
- Top Defenceman (NOJHL Award) - Ethan Strong, Kirkland Lake Gold Miners
- Most Improved (Gilles Laperriere Trophy) - Brennan Roy, Abitibi Eskimos
- Top Defensive Forward (Mitch Tetreault Memorial Trophy) - Brett Jefferies, Soo Thunderbirds
- Team Goaltending (NOJHL Award) - Mario Culina/Brian Kment, Soo Thunderbirds
- Top GAA (Wayne Chase Memorial Award) - Mario Culina, Soo Thunderbirds
- Top Scorer (Jimmy Conners Memorial Trophy) - Steve Harland, Powassan Voodoos
- Most Valuable Player (Carlo Catterello Trophy) - Steve Harland, Powassan Voodoos
- Top Rookie (John Grignon Trophy) - Steve Harland, Powassan Voodoos
- Most Gentlemanly Player (Onaping Falls Huskies Trophy) - Nicolas Tassone, Soo Thunderbirds
- Top Team Player (NOJHL Trophy) - Ethan Strong, Kirkland Lake Gold Miners
- Scholastic Award (NOJHL Trophy) -
- CJHL Scholastic Nominee Award -
- Playoff's Most Valuable Player (NOJHL Trophy) - Owen Headrick, Soo Thunderbirds
- Coach of the Year (Mirl "Red" McCarthy Memorial Award) - Jordan Smith, Soo Thunderbirds
- Top Executive (Joe Drago Trophy) - Todd Stencill, Elliot Lake Wildcats

== See also ==
- 2015 Royal Bank Cup
- Dudley Hewitt Cup
- List of NOHA Junior A seasons
- Ontario Junior Hockey League
- Superior International Junior Hockey League
- Greater Ontario Junior Hockey League
- 2014 in ice hockey
- 2015 in ice hockey

Preceded by 2013–14 NOJHL season	NOJHL seasons	Succeeded by 2015–16 NOJHL season
