= 2022–23 NOJHL season =

45th season of the NOJHL

- League: Northern Ontario Junior Hockey League
- Sport: Ice hockey
- Duration: September–March
- Games: 347
- Teams: 12
- Total attendance: 101,620
- Streaming partner: HockeyTV

NOJHL seasons
- ← 2021–22 2023–24 →

The 2022–23 NOJHL season was the 45th season of the Northern Ontario Junior Hockey League (NOJHL).

The franchise formerly known as the Espanola Express was rebranded as the Espanola Paper Kings.

The Powassan Voodoos named Peter Goulet as its new head coach following the resignation of Marc Lafleur.

== Regular season ==
The regular season ran from 8 September to 19 March with teams playing a 58-game schedule. The Timmins Rock finished the regular season in first place overall, while the Greater Sudbury Cubs finished first in the West division. The top four teams from each division advanced to the post-season.

East division
Team	GP	W	L	OTW	OTL	GF	GA	Pts
Timmins Rock	58	45	8	3	2	273	111	95
Hearst Lumberjacks	58	43	13	2	0	277	155	88
Powassan Voodoos	58	37	20	1	0	225	171	75
French River Rapids	58	9	46	2	1	145	304	21
Kirkland Lake Gold Miners	57	7	48	1	1	104	295	16
Cochrane Crunch	58	7	49	1	1	99	327	16

Source: "2022–23 NOJHL standings". hockeydb.com.

West division
Team	GP	W	L	OTW	OTL	GF	GA	Pts
Greater Sudbury Cubs	58	46	10	2	0	248	138	94
Blind River Beavers	58	42	11	3	2	244	125	89
Soo Thunderbirds	57	36	15	3	3	229	161	78
Espanola Paper Kings	58	29	24	2	3	223	218	63
Soo Eagles	58	26	27	4	1	206	212	57
Elliot Lake Red Wings	58	20	35	1	2	174	230	43

Source: "2022–23 NOJHL standings". hockeydb.com.

== Post-season ==
2023 League championship
Copeland Cup – McNamara Trophy

Tournament details
- Dates: 23 March-30 April 2023
- Teams: 8
- Defending champions: Soo Thunderbirds

Final positions
- Champions: Timmins Rock
- Runners-up: Soo Thunderbirds
- Semifinalists: Powassan Voodoos; Greater Sudbury Cubs

Tournament statistics
- Games played: 36
- Goals scored: 250 (6.94 per game)
- Attendance: 19,995 (555 per game)

Awards
- Playoff MVP: Harry Clark

The top four teams from each division at the end of the regular season advanced to the playoffs. In the final round, the Timmins Rock defeated the defending championship Soo Thunderbirds in six games to win the league championship Copeland Cup – McNamara Trophy and advanced to the national championship in Portage la Prairie.

Quarterfinals
Timmins Rock	4
French River Rapids	1
Hearst Lumberjacks	2
Powassan Voodoos	4
Greater Sudbury Cubs	4
Espanola Paper Kings	1
Blind River Beavers	1
Soo Thunderbirds	4

Semifinals
Timmins Rock	4
Powassan Voodoos	0
Greater Sudbury Cubs	1
Soo Thunderbirds	4

Finals
Timmins Rock	4
Soo Thunderbirds	2

Source: "2022–23 NOJHL playoff results". hockeydb.com.

== National championship ==
The national championship tournament took place at Stride Place in Portage la Prairie, Manitoba from 11–21 May 2023. The tournament included the championship teams from each of the 9 leagues that collectively make up the Canadian Junior Hockey League and the hosting Portage Terriers. The Portage Terriers and the City of Portage la Prairie had been selected to host the 2020 Centennial Cup tournament, which was cancelled due to public health restrictions related to the COVID-19 pandemic. The team had previously hosted, and won, the 2015 Royal Bank Cup, as the tournament was then known. Multiple corporate sponsors, including the title sponsor, Tim Hortons, withdrew their support for the tournament in response to the Hockey Canada sexual assault scandal.

The Soo Thunderbirds were eliminated from competition in the preliminary round. The Brooks Bandits of the AJHL ultimately won the championship after defeating the Battlefords North Stars in the final.

== Individual awards ==
Most valuable player of the regular season
Nicolas Pigeon, Timmins Rock
Best defenceman
Alex Little, Powassan Voodoos
Rookie of the year
Kyloe Ellis, Greater Sudbury Cubs
Most improved player
Caleb Minns, Blind River Beavers
Top defensive forward
Dharan Cap, Soo Thunderbirds
Best goals-against-average for a goaltender
Jacob Brown, Timmins Rock
Team goaltending award
Patrick Boivin & Jacob Brown, Timmins Rock
League scoring champion
Nicolas Pigeon, Timmins Rock
Most gentlemanly player
Mathieu Comeau, Hearst Lumberjacks
Best overall team player
Lucas Signoretti, Espanola Paper Kings
Coach of the year
Peter Goulet, Powassan Voodoos
Executive of the year
Ted Gooch, Timmins Rock

== Sources ==
- "2025 Centennial Cup Guide & Record Book" (PDF). hockeycanada.ca.
- "NOJHL individual awards". nojhl.com.
- "2022–2023 attendance". nojhl.com.
- Perry, Thomas (1 May 2023). "Crunch apply to relocated to Iroquois Falls for 2023–24 season". timminspress.com. Postmedia.
- "NOJHL mourns passing of former commissioner Hector Seguin". cjhlhockey.com. 17 January 2023.
- Morley, Helen (30 March 2023). "Lucas Signoretti wins NOJHL trophy". midnorthmonitor.com. Postmedia.
- Russon, Randy; Annelin, Tom (18 January 2022). "Young talent making an impressive mark throughout the NOJHL". saultthisweek.com. Postmedia.
- Dawson, Chris (1 June 2023). "McCharles making strides and creating opportunities". BayToday.ca. Village Media.
- Russon, Randy (19 April 2022). "Comment: Plaudits for the SIJHL as a beckoning junior hockey option". saultthisweek.com. Postmedia.
- Wyman, Rick (14 May 2023). "Rock now even at Centennial Cup". CTV News Northern Ontario. Bell Media.
- Sawatzky, Mike (15 May 2023). "Bandits rolling over the competition". Winnipeg Free Press.
- Comeau, Tina (18 May 2023). "Yarmouth Mariners to face Portage Terriers in Centennial Cup quarter-finals". saltwire.com. Postmedia.
- "Former NHLer and Jr Trappers championship coach passes". BayToday.ca. Village Media. 14 April 2022.
- Perry, Thomas (20 February 2023). "UPDATE: Suspension handed out following penalty-filled loss". timminspress.com. Postmedia.
- White, Erik (2 December 2022). "They look a lot like the Wolves, but Greater Sudbury Cubs say they're not trying to compete". CBC News. CBC/Radio-Canada.
- Russon, Randy (3 May 2022). "West Virginia hockey coach who hails from Iron Bridge goes north for goalie". saultthisweek.com. Postmedia.
- "Cubs win first-round playoff series against the Paper Kings". Sudbury.com. 31 March 2023.
