= 2019–20 NOJHL season =

42nd season of the NOJHL

- League: Northern Ontario Junior Hockey League
- Sport: Ice hockey
- Duration: September–March
- Teams: 12

NOJHL seasons
- ← 2018–19 2020–21 →

The 2019–20 NOJHL season was the 42nd season of the Northern Ontario Junior Hockey League (NOJHL). The Powassan Voodoos finished the regular season in first place overall, however, the league championship Copeland Cup – McNamara Trophy was not awarded due to the COVID-19 pandemic forcing the cancellation of the playoffs.

On 12 March 2020, the league cancelled all events indefinitely due to the COVID-19 pandemic. The cancellation came after the completion of the regular season, but before the completion of the post-season. Consequently, no team was awarded the league championship Copeland Cup – McNamara Trophy.

Timmins Rock goalie, Tyler Masternak, set a new league record with 8 shutouts in a single season. The previous record of 6 was also set by Masternak during the 2018–19 NOJHL season. Masternak recorded a total of 18 shutouts during his NOJHL career, more than any goalie in league history.

== Regular season ==
The regular began on 5 September 2019 and concluded on 1 March 2020. Each team played 56 season games, with the Powassan Voodoos finishing in first place overall and the Rayside Balfour Canadians finishing first in the West division. It was the Voodoos' 3rd first-place finish in the team's 6-year history.

East division
Team	GP	W	L	OTW	OTL	GF	GA	Pts
Powassan Voodoos	56	45	9	1	1	264	141	92
Timmins Rock	56	42	11	2	1	231	100	87
Hearst Lumberjacks	56	31	18	4	3	202	177	69
Cochrane Crunch	56	26	25	3	2	166	189	57
Kirkland Lake Gold Miners	56	18	32	5	1	154	228	42
French River Rapids	56	13	38	4	1	136	250	31

Source: "2019–20 NOJHL standings". hockeydb.com.

West division
Team	GP	W	L	OTW	OTL	GF	GA	Pts
Rayside Balfour Canadians	56	40	11	3	2	260	163	85
Blind River Beavers	56	37	15	1	3	223	158	78
Soo Thunderbirds	56	30	19	3	4	220	166	67
Soo Eagles	56	30	21	2	3	185	171	65
Espanola Express	56	17	34	4	1	167	247	39
Elliot Lake Wildcats	56	7	46	3	0	115	333	17

Source: "2019–20 NOJHL standings". hockeydb.com.

== Post-season ==
The first round of the playoffs ran from 4 – 8 March 2024. In the East division, the Cochrane Crunch defeated the Kirkland Lake Gold Miners 2 games to 1 to advance to the quarterfinals. In the West division, the Soo Eagles defeated the Espanola Express 2 games to 0, also advancing to the quarterfinals.

The Hearst Lumberjacks defeated the Timmins Rock in the first game of the quarterfinals. The following day, the league announced the cancellation of all remaining games due to the COVID-19 pandemic.

== Sources ==
- "NOJHL announces cancellation for remainder of the 2019–20 season". nojhl.com (Press release). 13 March 2020.
- "Minor hockey along with the NOJHL playoffs cancelled due to COVID-19". BayToday.ca. Village Media. 12 March 2020.
- Papineau, Chelsea (13 March 2020). "List of northern Ontario cancellations and closures due to COVID-19". CTV News Northern Ontario. Bell Media.
- Leeson, Ben (13 May 2019). "Bricknell joins Rapids as head coach". Sudbury Star. Postmedia.
- "Forsyth formally announced as Canadians GM". Sudbury Star. Postmedia. 9 August 2019.
