= 2020–21 NOJHL season =

43rd season of the NOJHL

- League: Northern Ontario Junior Hockey League
- Sport: Ice hockey
- Duration: November–March
- Games: 66
- Teams: 9
- Total attendance: 2,171
- Streaming partner: HockeyTV

NOJHL seasons
- ← 2019–20 2021–22 →

The 2020–21 NOJHL season was the 43rd season of the Northern Ontario Junior Hockey League (NOJHL). It was the second year in which league operations were significantly impacted by the COVID-19 pandemic. There was no postseason playoff for the league championship Copeland Cup – McNamara Trophy. Four clubs took leaves of absence. The Elliot Lake Wildcats announced in May 2020 that the team had taken leave in light of the impact of the COVID-19 pandemic. The Soo Eagles, based in Sault Ste. Marie, Michigan, were hampered by border restrictions. The Powassan Voodoos and Kirkland Lake Gold Miners withdrew midseason citing "ongoing issues associated with the COVID-19 pandemic".

== Statistics ==
East division
Team	GP	W	L	OTW	OTL	GF	GA	Pts
Timmins Rock	22	18	4	0	0	110	43	36
Hearst Lumberjacks	12	7	5	0	0	47	41	14
Cochrane Crunch	21	4	15	0	2	55	122	10
Kirkland Lake Gold Miners	5	3	2	0	0	20	15	6

Source: "2020–21 NOJHL standings". hockeydb.com.

West division
Team	GP	W	L	OTW	OTL	GF	GA	Pts
Soo Thunderbirds	21	13	6	0	2	99	71	28
Blind River Beavers	21	9	11	0	1	82	99	19
Espanola Express	12	5	4	0	3	46	56	13
French River Rapids	8	4	4	0	0	36	38	8
Rayside Balfour Canadians	10	3	6	0	1	32	42	7

Source: "2020–21 NOJHL standings". hockeydb.com.

== See also ==
- COVID-19 pandemic in Ontario
- Timeline of the COVID-19 pandemic in Ontario (2020)
- Timeline of the COVID-19 pandemic in Ontario (2021)

== Sources ==
- "2020–21 NOJHL standings". hockeydb.com.
- "NOJHL to commence 2020–21 regular season Friday". nojhl.com (Press release). 12 November 2020.
- Leeson, Ben (2 September 2020). "Up to the task: Rapids owner says team, league prepared for realities of 'COVID hockey'". thesudburystar.com. Postmedia.
- "Voodoos head coach moving on". BayToday.ca. Village Media. 12 August 2020.
- Perry, Thomas (20 April 2021). "Voodoos name Lafleur head coach". Postmedia.
- "Call him Chairman Mazzuca". saultstar.com. Postmedia. 21 May 2021.
- Russon, Randy (9 March 2021). "NOJHL boss Rob Mazzuca was a star OHL defender". saultthisweek.com. Postmedia.
- Sookram, Matt (18 May 2021). "How an investment in avocados led Jim Bruce to owning an NOJHL championship winning team". BayToday.ca. Village Media.
- Russon, Randy (6 October 2020). "Local lads on Sault's NOJHL team now up to 11 skaters including no less than seven incoming players". saultthisweek.com. Postmedia.
- Svela, Kris (19 April 2021). "Elliot Lake Red Wings unveil new jerseys". ElliotLakeToday.com. Village Media.
- Russon, Randy (24 August 2020). "Sault's Ryan Leonard sells Cochrane Crunch to former OHL player". saultthisweek.com. Postmedia.
- Leeson, Ben (17 September 2020). "Chaumont back full-time: Former Sudbury Wolves star, longtime pro player makes move to coaching with Rayside-Balfour Canadians". Sudbury Star. Postmedia.
- Rodrigues, Gabby (17 March 2020). "Ontario government declares state of emergency amid coronavirus pandemic". Global News. Corus Entertainment.
- Frommer, Molly (16 November 2020). "Junior A hockey returns to northern Ontario". CTV News Northern Ontario. Bell Media.
- Tascher, Eric (22 August 2020). "NOJHL outlines its 'Return To Play' strategy for upcoming hockey season". CTV News Northern Ontario. Bell Media.
- Russon, Randy (5 April 2021). "News, views and dues from 2020-2021 NOJHL season". saultthisweek.com. Postmedia.
- Ruicci, Peter (4 August 2020). "Start of season likely to be delayed". timminspress.com. Postmedia.
- Ruicci, Peter (5 August 2020). "NOJHL 'will not operate without fans'". nugget.ca. Postmedia.
- Quevillon, Alain (21 August 2020). "Timmins Rock to hit the Ice after Labour Day weekend, league waiting for green light on 2020 season". Q92 Timmins. Rogers Digital Media.
- Coccimiglio, Brad (23 August 2020). "'It has been six long months': NOJHL hoping for mid-October return". Sudbury.com.
- Perry, Thomas (23 February 2021). "NOJHL back: Rock bolster roster". timminspress.com. Postmedia.
- Coccimiglio, Brad (3 January 2021). "NOJHL announces January cohorts, return date remains up in the air". SooToday.com. Village Media.
