= 2021–22 NOJHL season =

44th season of the NOJHL

- League: Northern Ontario Junior Hockey League
- Sport: Ice hockey
- Duration: September–April
- Games: 288
- Teams: 12
- Total attendance: 67,555
- Streaming partner: HockeyTV
- Finals champions: Soo Thunderbirds

NOJHL seasons
- ← 2020–21 2022–23 →

The 2021–22 NOJHL season was the 44th season of the Northern Ontario Junior Hockey League (NOJHL). The Soo Thunderbirds finished the regular season in first place overall and went on to win the league championship Copeland Cup – McNamara Trophy.

The franchise formerly known as the Balfour Rayside Canadiens relocated to Greater Sudbury and was rebranded as the Greater Sudbury Cubs.

Referee Brandy Dewar-Beecroft became the first woman referee to officiate an NOJHL game on 20 February 2022 in a match between the Blind River Beavers and Elliot Lake Red Wings.

== Regular season ==
The regular season ran from 16 September 2021 to 2 April 2022, with each team playing a 48-game schedule. The Soo Thunderbirds finished in first place overall and the Timmins Rock finished first in the East division. The top 5 teams in each division advanced to the playoffs.

East division
Team	GP	W	L	OTW	OTL	GF	GA	Pts
Timmins Rock	48	33	8	5	2	225	124	73
Hearst Lumberjacks	48	35	11	2	0	217	139	72
Powassan Voodoos	48	30	11	6	1	184	145	67
French River Rapids	48	23	24	1	0	197	196	47
Kirkland Lake Gold Miners	48	12	33	0	3	151	231	27
Cochrane Crunch	48	2	43	1	2	91	270	7

Source: "2021–22 NOJHL standings". hockeydb.com.

West division
Team	GP	W	L	OTW	OTL	GF	GA	Pts
Soo Thunderbirds	48	38	5	2	3	189	101	81
Soo Eagles	48	33	11	2	2	178	148	70
Greater Sudbury Cubs	48	27	17	3	1	171	131	58
Blind River Beavers	48	25	17	6	0	151	159	56
Elliot Lake Red Wings	48	17	29	1	1	149	192	36
Espanola Express	48	13	31	4	0	150	217	30

Source: "2021–22 NOJHL standings". hockeydb.com.

== Post-season ==
2022 League championship
Copeland Cup – McNamara Trophy

Tournament details
- Teams: 10

Final positions
- Champions: Soo Thunderbirds
- Runners-up: Hearst Lumberjacks
- Semifinalists: Timmins Rock; Soo Eagles

Tournament statistics
- Games played: 43
- Goals scored: 267 (6.21 per game)
- Attendance: 26,365 (613 per game)

Awards
- Playoff MVP: Noah Metivier

The first, second and third-place teams from each division at the conclusion of the regular season advanced to the quarterfinals. The fourth and fifth-place teams from each division played each other in a best-of-three series, with the winner advancing to play the first-place team from their division in the quarterfinals. The winners of the quarterfinals, semifinals and final were determined by best-of-seven series. The Soo Thunderbirds defeated the Hearst Lumberjacks in game 7 of the final round to win the league championship Copeland Cup – McNamara Trophy and advance to the national championship 2022 Centennial Cup tournament in Estevan, Saskatchewan.

First round
French River Rapids	2
Kirkland Lake	0
Blind River Beavers	2
Elliot Lake Red Wings	1

Quarterfinals
Timmins Rock	4
French River Rapids	0
Powassan Voodoos	2
Hearst Lumberjacks	4
Soo Thunderbirds	4
Blind River Beavers	0
Soo Eagles	4
Greater Sudbury Cubs	2

Semifinals
Timmins Rock	3
Hearst Lumberjacks	4
Soo Thunderbirds	4
Soo Eagles	0

Finals
Hearst Lumberjacks	3
Soo Thunderbirds	4

Source: "2021–22 NOJHL playoff results". hockeydb.com.

== National championship ==
2022 National championship
Centennial Cup
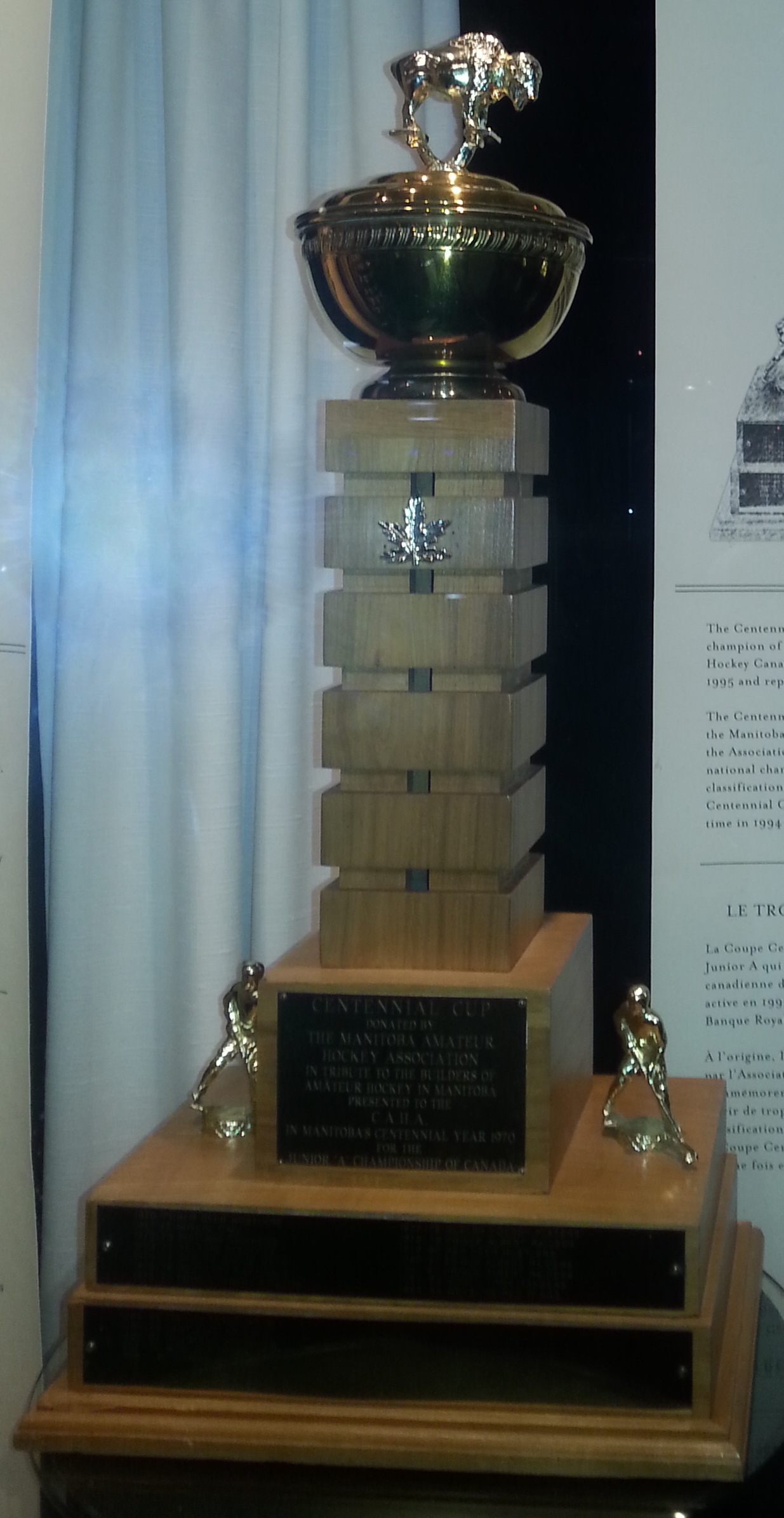

Tournament details
- City: Estevan, Saskatchewan
- Venue: Affinity Place
- Dates: 18–20 May 2022
- Teams: 10
- Host team: Estevan Bruins
- Defending champions: Brooks Bandits

Final positions
- Champions: Brooks Bandits
- Runners-up: Pickering Panthers

Awards
- MVP: Carson Cherepak

Official website
- Hockey Canada

In 2022, Hockey Canada eliminated regional inter-league championships and expanded the national championship tournament to 10 teams. The new format consisted of a 4-game round-robin with two groups of five teams, followed by a six-team single-elimination play-off.

The tournament took place at Affinity Place in Estevan, Saskatchewan from 18–29 May 2022. It was the first year the event had been played since 2019, as the COVID-19 pandemic had forced the cancellation of the 2020 and 2021 tournaments.

The Soo Thunderbirds were eliminated from competition after losing four games in the round-robin phase. In the final round, the Brooks Bandits of the AJHL defeated the Pickering Panthers of the OJHL to win the tournament.

=== Round robin ===
The new format consisted of a 4-game round-robin with two groups of five teams, followed by a six-team single-elimination play-off. The top 3 teams from each group advanced to the playoffs, and the 1st place teams in each group had a bye to the semifinals.

	Group A	BB	PP	CFL	EB	RLM
1	Brooks Bandits		9-1	5-2	4-0	11-4
2	Pickering Panthers	1-9		3-2	10-5	9-2
3	Collège Français de Longueuil	2-5	2-3		5-3	6-1
4	Estevan Bruins	0-4	5-10	3-5		6-2
5	Red Lake Miners	4-11	2-9	1-6	2-6	

	Group B	DK	SWC	FFB	OJS	ST
1	Dauphin Kings		7-1	1-2	2-1	6-1
2	Summerside Western Capitals	1-7		4-1	4-3	4-1
3	Flin Flon Bombers	2-1	1-4		3-2	6-1
4	Ottawa Jr. Senators	1-2	3-4	2-3		4-0
5	Soo Thunderbirds	1-6	1-4	1-6	0-4	

=== Playoffs ===
Quarterfinals
Pickering Panthers	3
Flin Flon Bombers	2
Summerside Western Capitals	3
Collège Français de Longueuil	4

Semifinals
Pickering Panthers	2
Dauphin Kings	0
Brooks Bandits	11
Collège Français de Longueuil	2

Finals
Pickering Panthers	1
Brooks Bandits	4

== Sources ==
- "NOJHL announces plans for 2021–22 season". cjhlhockey.com (Press release). 23 June 2021.
- "NOJHL releases its 2021–22 regular season schedule". nojhl.com (Press release). 10 July 2021.
- "Thunderbird alumni netminder Landon Miller most recent NOJHL player to be draft in 2024 by NHL Detroit Red Wings". saultsports.com. 5 July 2024. "Gibson, 19, was named the NOJHL's Best Defenceman as a member of the Thunderbirds in 2021-22, while going on to earn first team all-star laurels."
- Leeson, Ben (25 June 2021). "Rapids well underway in building NOJHL entry for 2021–22". thesudburystar.com. Postmedia.
- "CJHL announces its Top Goaltender award finalists for 2021–22". cjhlhockey.com (Press release). 4 May 2022.
- Coccimiglio, Brad (30 April 2021). "New Thunderbirds ownership group has NHL connection". SooToday.com. Village Media.
- Perry, Thomas (30 April 2021). "UPDATE: Rock name Perry GM/Coach". timminspress.com. Postmedia.
- Swain, Miranda (7 October 2021). "Wolves affiliate with Cubs and Spirit". chl.ca.
- Russon, Randy; Annelin, Tom (18 January 2022). "Young talent making an impressive mark throughout the NOJHL". saultthisweek.com. Postmedia.
- Russon, Randy (4 April 2022). "'We have D1 players in the NOJHL' says coach of Soo Eagles". saultthisweek.com. Postmedia.
- "NOJHL announces plan for return to action". SooToday.com. Village Media. 20 January 2022.
- Ruicci, Peter (6 May 2021). "Jarrett would 'love to have' OHL opportunity one day". saultstar.com. Postmedia.
- Russon, Randy (25 April 2022). "Kyle Brick signs up for three more years with Blind River Beavers". saultthisweek.com. Postmedia.
