= 2024–25 NOJHL season =

47th season of the NOJHL

- League: Northern Ontario Junior Hockey League
- Sport: Ice hockey
- Duration: Regular season 12 September–16 March; Playoffs; 20 March – 30 April
- Games: 312
- Teams: 12
- Total attendance: 102,538
- Streaming partner: HockeyTV

League championship
- Champions: Greater Sudbury Cubs
- Runners-up: Hearst Lumberjacks

NOJHL seasons
- ← 2023–24 2025–26 →

The 2024–25 NOJHL season was the 47th season of the Northern Ontario Junior Hockey League (NOJHL). The Greater Sudbury Cubs finished the regular season in first place, won the league championship Copeland Cup – McNamara Trophy for the second year in a row and went on to represent the NOJHL at the Junior A national championship tournament in Calgary, Alberta.

Lucas Signoretti of the Greater Sudbury Cubs became the second player to be named league MVP two seasons in a row. The other was Marty Reynolds of the North Bay Trappers (1962–1982) in the 1964–65 and 1965–66 seasons. Darryl Moxam, Head Coach of the Greater Sudbury Cubs, was named Coach of the Year for the second time in his career.

The league decided that matches that were tied after regulation time would play a 7-minute sudden-death overtime period. If neither team would score a goal in overtime, the game ended in a tie. In earlier seasons, the winner was determined by a shootout.

The Elliot Lake Vikings were placed on indefinite leave midseason due to the ongoing closure of the team's home arena that began in the 2023–24 NOJHL season. The team remained on leave through the 2025–26 NOJHL season, with the league commissioner stating, "We just don't know when the club will be able to resume activities as they wait for news on the status of their arena."

== Regular season ==
The regular season ran from 12 September 2024 through 16 March 2025. Beginning this year, teams were no longer assigned to east and west divisions. The top 8 teams advanced to the playoffs. The Greater Sudbury Cubs finished in first place overall. Teams were scheduled to play a 52-game schedule, however, the Elliot Lake Vikings folded midseason and its remaining games were forfeit. The 2024 NOJHL showcase event took place at the Gerry McCrory Countryside Sports Complex in Greater Sudbury.

Standings
Rank	Team	GP	W	L	T	OTW	OTL	Pts
1	Greater Sudbury Cubs	52	44	6	1	3	1	90
2	Hearst Lumberjacks	52	39	11	1	4	1	80
3	Blind River Beavers	52	34	14	2	3	2	72
4	Timmins Rock	52	33	16	2	0	1	69
5	Soo Eagles	52	32	17	0	3	3	67
6	Soo Thunderbirds	52	26	23	1	3	2	55
7	Powassan Voodoos	52	22	25	0	1	5	49
8	Iroquois Falls Storm	52	22	26	1	3	3	48
9	Espanola Paper Kings	52	21	27	3	1	1	46
10	French River Rapids	52	16	33	1	1	2	35
11	Kirkland Lake Gold Miners	52	9	39	1	1	3	22
12	Elliot Lake Vikings	52	7	44	1	1	0	15

Source: "2024–25 Northern Ontario Junior Hockey League standings". hockeydb.com.

== Playoffs ==
2025 League championship
Copeland Cup – McNamara Trophy

Tournament details
- Dates: 20 March – 30 April
- Teams: 8
- Defending champions: Greater Sudbury Cubs

Final positions
- Champions: Greater Sudbury Cubs
- Runners-up: Hearst Lumberjacks
- Semifinalists: Timmins Rock; Soo Thunderbirds

Tournament statistics
- Games played: 37
- Goals scored: 272 (7.35 per game)
- Attendance: 19,994 (540 per game)

Awards
- Playoff MVP: Lucas Signoretti

Official website
- 2025 NOJHL playoffs

The top 8 teams in the regular season advanced to the playoffs. Each round of the playoffs was a single-elimination best-of-seven series. In the final round, the defending championship Greater Sudbury Cubs defeated the Hearst Lumberjacks in seven games. The Cubs went on to compete for the national championship in Calgary at the 2025 Centennial Cup.

Quarterfinals
Greater Sudbury Cubs	4
Iroquois Falls Storm	0
Blind River Beavers	3
Soo Thunderbirds	4
Hearst Lumberjacks	4
Powassan Voodoos	0
Timmins Rock	4
Soo Eagles	2

Semifinals
Greater Sudbury Cubs	4
Soo Thunderbirds	0
Hearst Lumberjacks	4
Timmins Rock	1

Finals
Greater Sudbury Cubs	4
Hearst Lumberjacks	3

=== Quarterfinal: Greater Sudbury Cubs v. Iroquois Falls Storm ===
The first-place Greater Sudbury Cubs swept the eighth-place Iroquois Falls Storm four games to none in the first round.

20 March	Iroquois Falls Storm	1-7	Greater Sudbury Cubs	Gerry McCrory Countryside Sports Complex	Recap
15:07 - 1		First period	1 - 01:10; 2 - 05:09; 3 - 10:58 power play
No scoring		Second period	4 - 00:35 power play 5 - 04:20; 6 - 16:47
No scoring		Third period	7 - 16:21 power play

21 March	Iroquois Falls Storm	5-6	Greater Sudbury Cubs	Gerry McCrory Countryside Sports Complex	Recap
No scoring		First period	1 - 02:51; 2 - 05:36 shorthanded 3 - 07:29; 4 - 12:56
14:31 - 1		Second period	5 - 16:18
04:22 - 2; 10:08 - 3; 11:51 - 4 power play 14:05 - 5		Third period	6 - 04:04

24 March	Greater Sudbury Cubs	4-3	OT	Iroquois Falls Storm	Jus Jordan Arena	Recap
05:13 - 1 power play 10:51 - 2		First period		No scoring
power play 15:08 - 3		Second period		1 - 07:02 power play
No scoring		Third period		2 - 17:00; 3 - 18:00
19:57 - 4		First overtime period		No scoring

25 March	Greater Sudbury Cubs	2-0	Iroquois Falls Storm	Jus Jordan Arena	Recap
power play 19:55 - 1		First period	No scoring
No scoring		Second period	No scoring
05:29 - 2		Third period	No scoring

Greater Sudbury Cubs win 4-0

=== Quarterfinal: Blind River Beavers v. Soo Thunderbirds ===
The sixth-place Soo Thunderbirds defeated the third-place Blind River Beavers in seven games, winning the final game 6-3.

20 March	Soo Thunderbirds	0-1	Blind River Beavers	Blind River Community Centre	Recap
No scoring		First period	1 - 12:20
No scoring		Second period	No scoring
No scoring		Third period	No scoring

22 March	Soo Thunderbirds	5-4	Blind River Beavers	Blind River Community Centre	Recap
09:13 - 1; 11:45 - 2; 19:57 - 3		First period	1 - 10:22
No scoring		Second period	2 - 03:14; 3 - 05:14 power play 4 - 16:48
08:22 - 4; 08:34 - 5		Third period	No scoring

23 March	Blind River Beavers	4-3	Soo Thunderbirds	John Rhodes Community Centre	Recap
power play 19:10 - 1		First period	1 - 08:22
00:21 - 2 power play 05:15 - 3		Second period	2 - 13:54
power play 17:44 - 4		Third period	3 - 05:07

25 March	Blind River Beavers	2-4	Soo Thunderbirds	John Rhodes Community Centre	Recap
11:32 - 1		First period	1 - 02:30
13:46 - 2		Second period	No scoring
No scoring		Third period	2 - 09:34; 3 - 15:57; 4 - 17:20

27 March	Soo Thunderbirds	2-3	OT	Blind River Beavers	Blind River Community Centre	Recap
No scoring		First period		1 - 14:57
12:36 - 1		Second period		2 - 17:01
06:58 - 2		Third period		No scoring
No scoring		First overtime period		3 - 09:05

29 March	Blind River Beavers	0-3	Soo Thunderbirds	John Rhodes Community Centre	Recap
No scoring		First period	1 - 11:10
No scoring		Second period	No scoring
No scoring		Third period	2 - 04:19; 3 - 15:19

1 April	Soo Thunderbirds	6-3	Blind River Beavers	Blind River Community Centre	Recap
00:50 - 1		First period	1 - 10:28
power play 03:08 - 2; 03:19 - 3		Second period	No scoring
04:09 - 4; 08:02 - 5; 15:10 - 6		Third period	2 - 12:55; 3 - 18:35

Soo Thunderbirds win 4-3

=== Quarterfinal: Hearst Lumberjacks v. Powassan Voodoos ===
The second-place Hearst Lumberjacks swept the seventh-place Powassan Voodoos in four straight games.

21 March	Powassan Voodoos	4-7	Hearst Lumberjacks	Claude Larose Recreation Centre	Recap
03:24 - 1; 15:57 - 2		First period	1 - 11:35; 2 - 17:09
No scoring		Second period	3 - 05:30; 4 - 11:18
03:02 - 3; 10:22 - 4		Third period	5 - 05:14; 6 - 12:19; 7 - 19:04 empty net

22 March	Powassan Voodoos	2-7	Hearst Lumberjacks	Claude Larose Recreation Centre	Recap
power play 05:59 - 1		First period	1 - 06:23; 2 - 13:06; 3 - 16:25
00:34 - 2		Second period	4 - 19:32
No scoring		Third period	5 - 03:41; 6 - 12:44; 7 - 19:23

24 March	Hearst Lumberjacks	7-3	Powassan Voodoos	Powassan Sportsplex	Recap
07:12 - 1		First period	No scoring
01:08 - 2; 03:59 - 3 power play 10:51 - 4		Second period	1 - 10:27 shorthanded
13:50 - 5 power play 15:59 - 6; 18:19 - 7		Third period	2 - 05:24 power play 3 - 10:17 power play

25 March	Hearst Lumberjacks	4-3	OT	Powassan Voodoos	Powassan Sportsplex	Recap
No scoring		First period		1 - 02:59; 2 - 03:30
power play 04:10 - 1 power play 11:44 - 2; 17:29 - 3		Second period		3 - 06:47 power play
No scoring		Third period		No scoring
power play 05:19 - 4		First overtime period		No scoring

Hearst Lumberjacks win 4-0

=== Quarterfinal: Timmins Rock v. Soo Eagles ===
The fourth-place Timmins Rock defeated the fifth-place Soo Eagles 4-2.

22 March	Soo Eagles	1-4	Timmins Rock	McIntyre Arena	Recap
No scoring		First period	1 - 16:59 power play 2 - 17:47 power play
power play 04:30 - 1		Second period	No scoring
No scoring		Third period	3 - 05:06; 4 - 19:35

23 March	Soo Eagles	0-4	Timmins Rock	McIntyre Arena	Recap
No scoring		First period	No scoring
No scoring		Second period	1 - 17:21 power play
No scoring		Third period	2 - 02:26; 3 - 10:38 power play 4 - 16:59

26 March	Timmins Rock	3-5	Soo Eagles	Pullar Stadium	Recap
No scoring		First period	1 - 16:07
02:58 - 1; 07:36 - 2		Second period	2 - 09:58; 3 - 16:08
18:16 - 3		Third period	4 - 10:37; 5 - 17:16

27 March	Timmins Rock	3-2	Soo Eagles	Pullar Stadium	Recap
No scoring		First period	No scoring
power play 09:10 - 1; 18:13 - 2		Second period	1 - 05:52 power play
power play 09:47 - 3		Third period	2 - 12:40

28 March	Timmins Rock	3-5	Soo Eagles	Pullar Stadium	Recap
10:21 - 1		First period	1 - 07:52 power play 2 - 10:57
05:31 - 2		Second period	3 - 03:41
power play 00:42 - 3		Third period	4 - 17:30; 5 - 19:35

30 March	Soo Eagles	2-5	Timmins Rock	McIntyre Arena	Recap
06:20 - 1		First period	No scoring
power play 06:30 - 2		Second period	1 - 07:34; 2 - 08:54; 3 - 16:42
No scoring		Third period	4 - 19:07 empty net 5 - 19:41 empty net

Timmins Rock win 4-2

=== Semifinal: Greater Sudbury Cubs v. Soo Thunderbirds ===
The Greater Sudbury Cubs swept the Soo Thunderbirds 4-0.

3 April	Soo Thunderbirds	4-7	Greater Sudbury Cubs	Gerry McCrory Countryside Sports Complex	Recap
No scoring		First period	1 - 08:25; 2 - 09:56; 3 - 14:29 power play 4 - 16:13 power play 5 - 1946
00:48 - 1; 10:52 - 2 power play 14:27 - 3		Second period	6 - 05:59; 7 - 17:23 shorthanded
11:59 - 4		Third period	No scoring

4 April	Soo Thunderbirds	2-4	Greater Sudbury Cubs	Gerry McCrory Countryside Sports Complex	Recap
10:32 - 1		First period	1 - 08:31 power play 2 - 15:22
04:28 - 2		Second period	3 - 03:46 power play 4 - 07:06 power play
No scoring		Third period	No scoring

8 April	Greater Sudbury Cubs	6-3	Soo Thunderbirds	John Rhodes Community Centre	Recap
04:40 - 1; 18:33 - 2		First period	1 - 17:13
power play 14:01 - 3; 18:13 - 4		Second period	2 - 14:18; 3 - 15:12
07:56 - 5 empty net 17:52 - 6		Third period	No scoring

9 April	Greater Sudbury Cubs	5-0	Soo Thunderbirds	John Rhodes Community Centre	Recap
03:17 - 1; 05:18 - 2 power play 07:49 - 3		First period	No scoring
No scoring		Second period	No scoring
07:05 - 4 empty net, shorthanded 13:03 - 5		Third period	No scoring

Greater Sudbury Cubs win 4-0

=== Semifinal: Hearst Lumberjacks v. Timmins Rock ===
The Hearst Lumberjacks defeated the Timmins Rock 4–1 to advance to the final round.

4 April	Timmins Rock	2-5	Hearst Lumberjacks	Claude Larose Recreation Centre	Recap
No scoring		First period	1 - 06:26 shorthanded
03:24 - 1		Second period	2 - 09:08; 3 - 13:04 shorthanded 4 - 16:03
19:26 - 2		Third period	5 - 16:33

5 April	Timmins Rock	0-6	Hearst Lumberjacks	Claude Larose Recreation Centre	Recap
No scoring		First period	1 - 16:45 short handed
No scoring		Second period	2 - 05:52; 3 - 08:56; 4 - 14:24
No scoring		Third period	5 - 15:07 short handed 6 - 16:30

7 April	Hearst Lumberjacks	2-4	Timmins Rock	McIntyre Arena	Recap
19:30 - 1		First period	No scoring
01:31 - 2		Second period	1 - 02:02; 2 - 12:34
No scoring		Third period	3 - 10:22; 4 - 19:03 empty net

8 April	Hearst Lumberjacks	4-3	Timmins Rock	McIntyre Arena	Recap
No scoring		First period	1 - 11:57 power play
short handed 07:53 - 1 power play 13:47 - 2		Second period	2 - 09:27
16:42 - 3; 17:28 - 4		Third period	3 - 05:07

11 April	Timmins Rock	3-5	Hearst Lumberjacks	Claude Larose Recreation Centre	Recap
No scoring		First period	1 - 08:46; 2 - 15:06
04:11 - 1; 10:06 - 2		Second period	3 - 02:55; 4 - 08:10; 5 - 11:18 shorthanded
19:20 - 3		Third period	No scoring

Hearst Lumberjacks win 4-1

=== Final: Greater Sudbury Cubs v. Hearst Lumberjacks ===
The first-place Greater Sudbury Cubs won the league championship Copeland Cup – McNamara Trophy after defeating the second-place Hearst Lumberjacks in game 7 of the final.

17 April	Hearst Lumberjacks	6-2	Greater Sudbury Cubs	Gerry McCrory Countryside Sports Complex	Recap
shorthanded 07:32 - 1		First period	No scoring
power play 01:05 - 2 power play 01:51 - 3 power play 07:11 - 4		Second period	1 - 16:14; 2 - 18:58 power play
14:26 - 5 empty net 15:58 - 6		Third period	No scoring

18 April	Hearst Lumberjacks	4-5	OT	Greater Sudbury Cubs	Gerry McCrory Countryside Sports Complex	Recap
08:48 - 1		First period		1 - 11:58 power play
power play 05:21 - 2		Second period		2 - 0:47; 3 - 14:21
08:32 - 3; 12:50 - 4		Third period		4 - 19:13 power play
No scoring		First overtime period		5 - 04:30

22 April	Greater Sudbury Cubs	6-1	Hearst Lumberjacks	Claude Larose Recreation Centre	Recap
07:58 - 1; 09:58 - 2		First period	05:20 - 1
06:18 - 3 power play 19:43 - 4		Second period	No scoring
03:56 - 5 empty net 16:39 - 6		Third period	No scoring

23 April	Greater Sudbury Cubs	5-1	Hearst Lumberjacks	Claude Larose Recreation Centre	Recap
04:30 - 1; 13:03 - 2		First period	No scoring
No scoring		Second period	No scoring
power play 07:50 - 3 power play 09:36 - 4 shorthanded 10:29 - 5		Third period	1 - 10:49 power play

25 April	Hearst Lumberjacks	10-6	Greater Sudbury Cubs	Gerry McCrory Countryside Sports Complex	Recap
shorthanded 09:33 - 1		First period	1 - 03:47 power play
01:56 - 2 power play 10:09 - 3; 18:21 - 4		Second period	2 - 02:26; 3 - 04:19; 4 - 15:03 power play 5 - 16:24; 6 - 19:09 shorthanded
08:21 - 5; 11:58 - 6; 13:28 - 7; 15:23 - 8 power play, empty net 16:48 - 9 empty net 17:44 - 10		Third period	No scoring

28 April	Greater Sudbury Cubs	4-5	Hearst Lumberjacks	Claude Larose Recreation Centre	Recap
06:50 - 1		First period	1 - 11:18; 2 - 19:59
19:28 - 2		Second period	3 - 04:23; 4 - 09:47
08:30 - 3 power play 13:17 - 4		Third period	5 - 07:02

30 April	Hearst Lumberjacks	4-6	Greater Sudbury Cubs	Gerry McCrory Countryside Sports Complex	Recap
power play 18:57 - 1		First period	1 - 08:28 power play
06:28 - 2; 13:22 - 3		Second period	2 - 01:10 power play 3 - 03:43; 4 - 08:10; 5 - 10:45
03:25 - 4		Third period	6 - 19:23 empty net

Greater Sudbury Cubs win 4-3

== National championship ==
2025 National championship
Centennial Cup
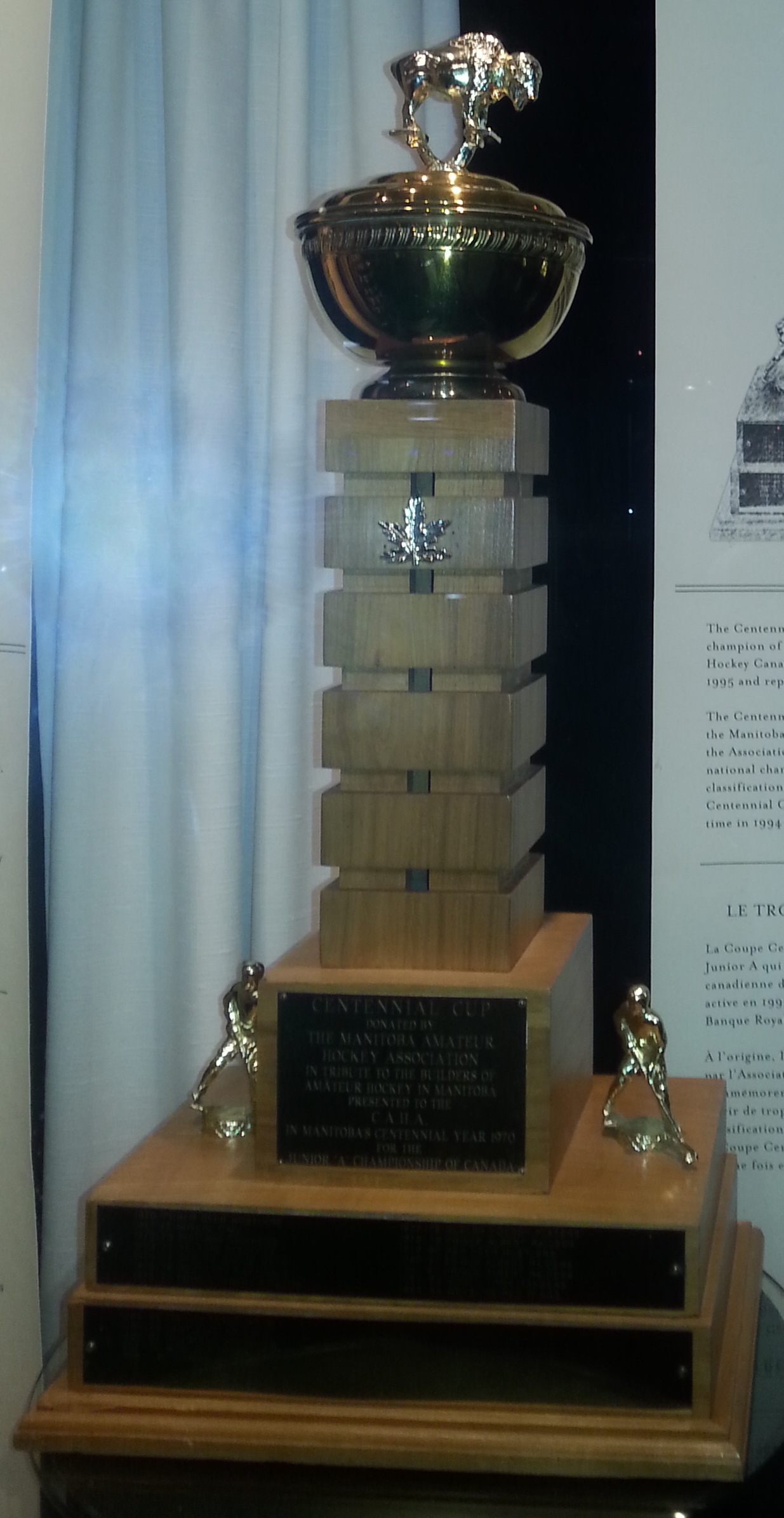

Tournament details
- Cities: Calgary, Alberta
- Venue: Max Bell Centre
- Dates: 8–18 May 2025
- Teams: 10
- Host team: Calgary Canucks

Final positions
- Champions: Calgary Canucks
- Runners-up: Melfort Mustangs
- Semifinalists: Rockland Nationals; Trenton Golden Hawks

Tournament statistics
- Games played: 25
- Goals scored: 189 (7.56 per game)

Official website
- Hockey Canada

The 54th annual Junior A national championship tournament was hosted by the Calgary Canucks of the Alberta Junior Hockey League (AJHL) at the Max Bell Centre in Calgary, and included the championship teams from the 9 leagues that collectively make up the Canadian Junior Hockey League (CJHL). The NOJHL was represented by the Copeland Cup – McNamara Trophy championship Greater Sudbury Cubs. The Cubs were eliminated from competition after losing to the Melfort Mustangs of the Saskatchewan Junior Hockey League, by a score of 7-1, in the quarterfinal.

== Individual awards ==
Lucas Signoretti of the Greater Sudbury Cubs became the second player in NOJHL history to be named league MVP two seasons in a row. The other was Marty Reynolds of the North Bay Trappers (1962–1982) in the 1964–65 and 1965–66 seasons. Signoretti was also named Playoff MVP and league scoring champion. He scored 46 goals and 55 assists in the regular season, and 17 goals and 19 assists during his 15 playoff matches.

Adam Shillinglaw, team captain of the Hearst Lumberjacks, was named the league's best defenceman.

Dryden Riley, goaltender for Timmins Rock, received the award for having the best goals-against-average with 2.39 goals per 60 minutes played.

Jordan Mayo, the first-year forward of the Iroquois Falls Storm, was named Rookie of the Year. He scored 24 goals and 51 points overall in the regular season.

Darryl Moxam, head coach of the Greater Sudbury Cubs, was named Coach of the Year for the second time in his career.

Owen King of the Blind River Beavers set an all-time league record for game-winning goals with 12. He scored a total of 50 goals all season and incurred only four minor penalties. King received the Most Gentlemanly Player award.

Lincoln Moore of the Greater Sudbury Cubs was named Most Sportsmanlike Player of the 2025 Centennial Cup national championship tournament.

Other awards:

- Most Improved Player: Cooper Fredericks of the Soo Eagles
- Top Defensive Forward: Bronson Babyak of the Hearst Lumberjacks
- Best Overall Team Player: Mathieu Comeau of the Hearst Lumberjacks
- Executive of the Year: Jim Bruce of the Powassan Voodoos
- Broadcaster of the Year: Dominic Turco and Anthony Valade of the Soo Thunderbirds

Source: "NOJHL individual awards". nojhl.com.
