= 2023–24 NOJHL season =

46th season of the NOJHL

- League: Northern Ontario Junior Hockey League
- Sport: Ice hockey
- Duration: September–March
- Games: 348
- Teams: 12
- Total attendance: 128,648
- Streaming partner: HockeyTV
- Finals champions: Greater Sudbury Cubs

NOJHL seasons
- ← 2022–23 2024–25 →

The 2023–24 NOJHL season was the 46th season of the Northern Ontario Junior Hockey League (NOJHL). The Greater Sudbury Cubs won the league championship Copeland Cup – McNamara Trophy after defeating the Powassan Voodoos in the final round of the playoffs.

The franchise formerly known as the Cochrane Crunch relocated to Iroquois Falls and became the Iroquois Falls Storm.

The franchise formerly known as the Elliot Lake Red Wings was renamed the Elliot Lake Vikings following a change in ownership. The team was forced out of its home arena in Elliot Lake due to "structural concerns". The team temporarily relocated to the Massey and District Community Centre some 45 miles (72 km) away in Blind River. The team's head coach and general manager, Chris Keleher, departed midseason and was replaced by Jon Campbell.

== Regular season ==
The regular season ran from 7 September 2023 – 17 March 2024. The Blind River Beavers finished in first place overall, ahead of the second place Greater Sudbury Cubs, with the defending 2022–23 championship Timmins Rock finishing first in the East division and third overall. The top four teams in each division advanced to the playoffs.

East division
| Team | GP | W | L | OTW | OTL | GF | GA | Pts |
|---|---|---|---|---|---|---|---|---|
| Timmins Rock | 58 | 41 | 15 | 2 | 0 | 272 | 177 | 84 |
| Hearst Lumberjacks | 58 | 36 | 16 | 4 | 2 | 244 | 184 | 78 |
| Powassan Voodoos | 58 | 36 | 19 | 1 | 2 | 253 | 182 | 75 |
| Iroquois Falls Storm | 58 | 16 | 39 | 0 | 3 | 157 | 273 | 35 |
| Kirkland Lake Gold Miners | 58 | 10 | 41 | 5 | 2 | 145 | 294 | 27 |
| French River Rapids | 58 | 10 | 46 | 1 | 1 | 164 | 334 | 22 |

Source: "2023–24 NOJHL standings". hockeydb.com.

West division
| Team | GP | W | L | OTW | OTL | GF | GA | Pts |
|---|---|---|---|---|---|---|---|---|
| Blind River Beavers | 58 | 45 | 12 | 0 | 1 | 284 | 148 | 91 |
| Greater Sudbury Cubs | 58 | 43 | 12 | 1 | 2 | 285 | 167 | 89 |
| Soo Thunderbirds | 58 | 39 | 14 | 4 | 1 | 265 | 158 | 83 |
| Espanola Paper Kings | 58 | 34 | 23 | 1 | 0 | 271 | 219 | 69 |
| Soo Eagles | 58 | 33 | 22 | 1 | 2 | 231 | 202 | 69 |
| Elliot Lake Vikings | 58 | 5 | 48 | 1 | 4 | 133 | 366 | 15 |

Source: "2023–24 NOJHL standings". hockeydb.com.

== Post-season ==
2024 League championship
Copeland Cup – McNamara Trophy

Tournament details
- Dates: 21 March–25 April 2024
- Teams: 8
- Defending champions: Timmins Rock

Final positions
- Champions: Greater Sudbury Cubs
- Runners-up: Powassan Voodoos
- Semifinalists: Timmins Rock; Blind River Beavers

Tournament statistics
- Games played: 39
- Goals scored: 255 (6.54 per game)
- Attendance: 24,442 (627 per game)

The top 4 teams in each division advanced to the playoffs. The Greater Sudbury Cubs won the league championship Copeland Cup – McNamara Trophy after defeating the Powassan Voodoos 4 games to 1 in the final round of the playoffs.

Quarterfinals
Timmins Rock | 4
Iroquois Falls Storm | 0
Hearst Lumberjacks | 1
Powassan Voodoos | 4
Blind River Beavers | 4
Espanola Paper Kings | 3
Greater Sudbury Cubs | 4
Soo Thunderbirds | 2

Semifinals
Timmins Rock | 3
Powassan Voodoos | 4
Blind River Beavers | 1
Greater Sudbury Cubs | 4

Finals
Powassan Voodoos | 1
Greater Sudbury Cubs | 4

Source: "2023–24 NOJHL playoff results". hockeydb.com.

== National championship ==
After winning the league championship, the Greater Sudbury Cubs went on to compete in the national championship tournament in Oakville, Ontario. The Cubs were eliminated after losing 3 out 4 games in the preliminary round-robin phase.
