= Powassan Voodoos =

Junior ice hockey club

- City: Powassan, Ontario
- League: NOJHL
- Founded: 2014
- Home arena: Powassan Sportsplex
- Colours
- Owners: Jim & Graeme Bruce, Ray Seguin
- General manager: Chris Dawson
- Head coach: Ty Pracek
- Website: voodooshockey.com

Championships
- League: 2017

The Powassan Voodoos are a junior ice hockey club and franchise of the Northern Ontario Junior Hockey League (NOJHL). The team plays its home games at the Powassan Sportsplex in Powassan, Ontario.

== History ==
The Voodoos were founded in 2014. The arrival of the team marked the return of junior hockey to Powassan for the first time since 1994, when the Powassan Hawks departed for Sturgeon Falls. The team signed an agreement with the North Bay Battalion of the Ontario Hockey League to serve as an official feeder to this squad. The team adopted a logo featuring a CF-101 Voodoo jet fighter and a roundel similar to the Royal Canadian Air Force's. Scott Wray, a fifteen-year veteran who skated mainly in the ECHL was chosen as head coach. During the 2014–15 season, the Voodoos' first in the league, the club finished with a 15–29–0–8 record.

In only their second year of operation the Voodoos claimed their first regular season Division Championship. In their third year the team repeated as regular season division champions and added the overall regular season league champions and they swept the Blind River Beavers in four games in the finals to advance to the Dudley Hewitt Cup. They finished the round-robin with a record of 1–2–0 and advanced to the semifinals, which they lost to the Georgetown Raiders with a score of 2–1.

Prior to the 2017–18 season, Scott Wray was promoted to an assistant coach position with the North Bay Battalion and Beau Moyer was hired as the team's second head coach. However, he would be fired from the team during the season on 29 January following a league imposed suspension after he had violated a league rule involving drinking with a few players. Both Moyer and his father, who was present in the hotel bar, cited that they had not invited the players to the bar, who were of legal drinking age, but that the players came to the bar on their own and then joined the coaches. After Moyer was fired, assistant coach Bruce Cazabon became the interim coach.

Max Gavin served as the head coach for the 2018–19 and 2019–20 seasons. He left the team in 2020 and was not immediately replaced during the COVID-19 pandemic that had curtailed the previous season.

Former Hearst Lumberjacks' head coach Mark Lafleur was hired as coach for the 2021–22 season.

Peter Goulet served as head coach from 2022–2026. Ty Pracek was hired as head coach in 2026.

Statistics
Season	GP	W	L	T	OTL	GF	GA	Pts	Regular season	Post-season
2014–15	52	15	29	0	8	217	262	38	4th in division 7th overall	Won first round against Mattawa (2:); Won quarterfinal against Kirkland Lake (4:2); Lost semifinal against Cochrane (4:0)
2015–16	54	40	10	1	3	278	137	84	2nd in division 3rd overall	Lost quarterfinal against Kirkland (4:2)
2016–17	56	46	7	1	2	271	121	95	1st in division 1st overall	Won quarterfinal against Kirkland Lake (4:0); Won semifinal against Timmins (4:0); Won final against Blind River (4:0)
2017–18	56	45	7	3	1	299	171	94	1st in division 1st overall	Lost quarterfinal against Timmins (4:2)
2018–19	56	33	19	0	4	206	172	70	3rd in division 4th overall	Won quarterfinal against Kirkland Lake (4:2); Lost semifinal against Hearst (4:0)
2019–20	56	45	9	0	2	264	141	92	1st in division 1st overall	Cancelled
2020–21	Cancelled									
2021–22	48	30	11	6	1	184	145	67	3rd in division 5th overall	Lost quarterfinal against Hearst (4:2)
2022–23	58	37	20	1	0	225	171	75	3rd in division 6th overall	Won quarterfinal against Hearst (4:2); Lost semifinal against Timmins (4:0)
2023–24	58	36	19	1	2	253	183	75	3rd in division 6th overall	Won quarterfinal against Hearst (4:1); Won semifinal against Timmins (4:3); Lost final against Greater Sudbury (4:1)
2024–25	52	22	25	0	5	161	177	49	7th overall	Lost quarterfinal against Hearst (4:0)
2025–26	52	36	13	1	2	251	149	75	2nd overall	Lost quarterfinal against Soo Eagles (4:0)

Source: "Powassan Voodoos statistics and history". hockeydb.com.

== League championship ==
2017 League championship
Copeland Cup – McNamara Trophy

Tournament details
- Dates: 10 March – 21 April 2017
- Teams: 10
- Defending champions: Soo Thunderbirds

Final positions
- Champions: Powassan Voodoos (1st title)
- Runners-up: Blind River Beavers
- Semifinalists: Timmins Rock; Soo Eagles

Tournament statistics
- Games played: 40
- Goals scored: 260 (6.5 per game)
- Attendance: 22,319 (558 per game)

Awards
- Playoff MVP: Parker Bowman

After placing 1st in the 2016–17 regular season, the Voodoos went undefeated in the post-season to win the league championship Copeland Cup – McNamara Trophy in 12 games. It was the first championship in the team's 3-year history.

The first, second and third place teams from each division after the regular season advanced to the quarterfinals, while the fourth and fifth place teams from each division advanced to the first-round best-of-three series of the playoffs. The winners from each best-of-three series advanced to the quarterfinals to play the first place team from their division.

First round
Kirkland Lake	2
Iroquois Falls Eskis	1
Soo Eagles	2
Elliot Lake Wildcats	1

Quarterfinals
Powassan Voodoos	4
Kirkland Lake	0
Timmins Rock	4
Cochrane Crunch	2
Soo Eagles	4
Soo Thunderbirds	0
Blind River Beavers	4
Rayside-Balfour	3

Semifinals
Powassan Voodoos	4
Timmins Rock	0
Soo Eagles	1
Blind River Beavers	4

Finals
Powassan Voodoos	4
Blind River Beavers	0

Source: "2016–17 NOJHL playoff results". hockeydb.com.

== Regional championship ==
Central Canada Championships
NOJHL – OJHL – SIJHL – Host
Round robin play with second vs. third in semifinal to advance against first in the finals.

Year	Round Robin	Record	Standing	Semifinal	Championship
2017	L, (Trenton Golden Hawks) 1–5; W, (Dryden Ice Dogs) 4–3; L, (Georgetown Raiders) 2–5	1–2–0	3rd of 4	L, (Georgetown Raiders) 1–2	—
