= Elliot Lake Vikings (2014) =

Junior ice hockey franchise

- City: Elliot Lake
- League: NOJHL
- Founded: 2014
- Home arena: Rogers Arena
- Colours: Green; Gold
- Owner: Jef Jarmovitch
- General manager: Taurean White
- Head coach: Taurean White
- Website: elliotlakevikings.com

Franchise history
- 2014–2021: Elliot Lake Wildcats
- 2021–2023: Elliot Lake Red Wings
- 2023–present: Elliot Lake Vikings

The Elliot Lake Vikings are a franchise of the Northern Ontario Junior Hockey League (NOJHL). The team plays its home games at Rogers Arena in Elliot Lake, Ontario.

== History ==
The franchise was established in 2014 as an expansion known as the Elliot Lake Wildcats. This followed the relocation of the former Elliot Lake Bobcats to Cochrane, Ontario to become the Cochrane Crunch. Nathan Hewitt, a former junior coach in the Central Canada Hockey League was chosen as the team's first coach.

During their inaugural 2014–15 season, the Wildcats finished second in their division with a 38-11-2-1 regular season record. However, their season was cut short in the semifinals losing 4-games-to-1 to the Soo Thunderbirds.

For their second season in 2015–16, the Wildcats once again finished second in their division, behind only the Soo Thunderbirds. The Wildcats were led offensively by Cole Hepler, who finished seventh in league scoring with 79 points and captain Spencer MacLean, who finished 10th respectively. Hepler also had a league high 22-game point streak during the season. Rookie goaltender Aaron Mackay starred for the team in net, finishing third in the league with 21 wins. The Wildcats eliminated the Rayside-Balfour Canadians in five games in the first round, before falling once again to the Thunderbirds in the Division Finals 4-games-to-1. The Wildcats would win the 2016 TEP Showcase Hockey Tournament with a 3–2 double overtime win over the Markham Royals on June 26. They finished with an 8–0 record, and conceded a tournament low five goals.

On July 28, 2016, the Wildcats announced that head coach Nathan Hewitt accepted a coaching job with a university in the CIS and Corey Bricknell was named the second head coach in team history. The Wildcats finished the 2016–17 season in fifth place in the NOJHL West Division going 23–26–4–3. Forward David Elford would lead the team in points with 42, while goaltender Matt Kostiw lead the team in wins with 13. In the playoffs, the Wildcats lost to the Soo Eagles in the divisional play-in series 2-games-to-1.

The 2017–18 season saw the Wildcats ending up in 5th place in the West Division, with a 25–27–4 record. Jacob Kelly was the team's leading scorer, with 34 goals and 36 assists, for a total of 70 points. The Wildcats lost in the divisional play in series for the second straight season, this time to Northshore rival the Blind River Beavers in 2 straight games.

The 2018–19 NOJHL season saw head coach Corey Bricknell step down to take a head coaching job in Hungary and was replaced by assistant coach Trevor Ritchie. The team finished with a 21–32–1–2 record. Just before the end of the regular season, the local civic centre in Elliot Lake saw its roof collapse, which saw the City of Elliot Lake close Centennial Arena and force the Wildcats to play their remaining home games in Blind River.

The 2019–20 NOJHL season brought it in a new head coach in Gord Ouimet, but there was still uncertainty that was Centennial Arena was going to be ready in time after the roof of the arena of the 53-year-old building was replaced. The Wildcats got off to slow start and never recovered, on December 6, 2019, Gord Ouimet was let go as head coach and was replaced by Taureen White. The team ended up in last place, with a 7–46–3 record.

The team took a one-year leave of absence during the 2020–21 NOJHL season.

In the 2021–22 season, under new management, the team was rebranded as the Elliot Lake Red Wings. The team ended the regular season with a 17-29-1-1 record before falling in the divisional round to the Blind River Beavers.

In 2022–23, the team hired Chris Keleher as head coach. The team performed slightly better than the previous year, ending the regular season with a 20-35-1-2 record, however, they placed last in their division and did not qualify for the playoffs.

In 2023–24, the club was rebranded as the Elliot Lake Vikings, a call-back to Elliot Lake's first junior team of the same name. Two days into the regular season, the team's home arena closed due to "structural concerns". The team relocated to the Massey and District Community Centre some 45 miles (72 km) away in Blind River. The team's head coach and general manager, Chris Keleher, departed midseason and was replaced by Jon Campbell.

In 2024–25, Mike Nesbitt was hired as the team's head coach and general manager. On 31 December 2024, the league announced that the team was taking a leave of absence for the remainder of the season due to "extenuating circumstances resulting from the ongoing closure of Rogers Arena, formerly Centennial Arena in Elliot Lake." This was later extended through the 2025–26 season. The club was reinstated for the 2026–27 NOJHL season.

== Season-by-season records ==
Season	GP	W	L	T	OTL	GF	GA	Pts	Result	Playoffs
Elliot Lake Wildcats
2014–15	52	38	11	2	1	242	142	79	2nd of 4, West; 3rd of 9, NOJHL	Won Quarterfinals, 4–2 vs. Sudbury Nickel Barons; Lost Semifinals, 1–4 vs. Soo Thunderbirds
2015–16	54	35	12	2	5	232	142	77	2nd of 6, West; 5th of 12, NOJHL	Won Div. Semifinals, 4–1 vs. Rayside-Balfour Canadians; Lost Div. Finals, 1–4 vs. Soo Thunderbirds
2016–17	56	23	26	4	3	157	174	53	5th of 6, West; 9th of 12, NOJHL	Lost Div. Play-in series, 1–2 vs. Soo Eagles
2017–18	56	25	27	0	4	172	204	54	5th of 6, West; 8th of 12, NOJHL	Lost Div. Play-in series, 0–2 vs. Blind River Beavers
2018–19	56	21	32	—	3	152	224	45	5th of 6, West; 10th of 12, NOJHL	Lost Div. Quarterfinals, 0–2 vs. Blind River Beavers
2019–20	56	7	46	—	3	115	333	17	6th of 6, West; 12th of 12, NOJHL	Did not qualify
Elliot Lake Red Wings
2021–22	48	17	29	1	1	149	192	35	5th of 6, West; 9th of 12, NOJHL	Lost Div. Quarterfinals, 1–2 vs. Blind River Beavers
2022–23	58	20	35	1	2	174	230	43	6th of 6, West; 9th of 12, NOJHL	Did Not Qualify for Post Season
Elliot Lake Vikings
2023–24	58	5	48	1	4	133	366	15	6th of 6, West; 12th of 12, NOJHL	Did Not Qualify for Post Season
2024–25	52	7	44	1	0	85	143	15	12th of 12, NOJHL	Did Not Qualify for Post Season
