= Espanola Paper Kings =

Junior ice hockey club

- City: Espanola, Ontario
- League: NOJHL
- Founded: 2015
- Home arena: Espanola Regional Recreation Complex
- Colours: Oxford blue Dark green Pure yellow
- Owner: Jason Rapcewicz
- General manager: Jason Rapcewicz
- Head coach: Jason Rapcewicz
- Website: espanolapaperkings.com

Franchise history
- 2015–2022: Espanola Express
- Since 2022: Espanola Paper Kings

The Espanola Paper Kings are a junior ice hockey club and franchise of the Northern Ontario Junior Hockey League (NOJHL). The team plays its home games at the Espanola Regional Recreation Complex in Espanola, Ontario.

== History ==
=== Espanola Express ===
The Espanola Express joined the NOJHL as an expansion franchise in 2015. The club was co-owned by Tom McCarthy, Chad Clarke and Jason Rapcewicz. McCarthy and Clarke were former staff members of the Espanola Rivermen, which folded that same year.

In August 2016, coach McCarthy announced he was taking a head coaching position with HSC Csíkszereda in the Romanian Hockey League but would also remain involved with the Express as one of the owners. Jason Rapcewicz took over as head coach. However, after one season, McCarthy returned to Espanola and the head coaching position. He left again after one season and was replaced by Dave Clancy from the Rayside-Balfour Canadians.

In 2019, Jason Rapcewicz became the sole owner and head coach.

Statistics
Season	GP	W	L	T	OTL	GF	GA	Pts	Season	Postseason
2015–16	54	12	39	0	3	132	243	27	5th in division 10th overall	Lost first round against Soo Eagles (2:0)
2016–17	56	9	45	1	1	139	297	20	6th in division 11th overall	Did not qualify
2017–18	56	2	52	1	1	114	344	6	6th in division 12th overall	Did not qualify
2018–19	56	10	43	0	3	145	291	23	6th in division 12th overall	Did not qualify
2019–20	56	17	34	0	5	167	247	39	5th in division 10th overall	Lost first round against Soo Eagles (2:0)
2020–21	12	5	4	0	3	46	56	13	Cancelled	
2021–22	48	13	31	4	0	150	217	30	6th in division 10th overall	Did not qualify

Source: "Espanola Express hockey team statistics and history". hockeydb.com.

=== Espanola Paper Kings ===
In 2022, the organization rebranded as the Espanola Paper Kings in 2022. The club also entered an affiliation agreement with the Sudbury Wolves.

Statistics
Season	GP	W	L	T	OTL	GF	GA	Pts	Season	Postseason
2022–23	58	29	24	2	3	233	218	63	4th in division 7th overall	Lost quarterfinal against Greater Sudbury (4:1)
2023–24	58	34	23	1	0	271	219	69	4th in division 7th overall	Lost quarterfinal against Blind River (4:3)
2024–25	52	21	27	3	1	183	237	46	9th place	Did not qualify
2025–26	52	27	21	1	3	211	195	58	6th place	Lost quarterfinal against Hearst (4:0)

Source: "Espanola Paper Kings hockey team statistics and history". hockeydb.com.
