= Kirkland Lake Gold Miners =

- City: Kirkland Lake
- League: NOJHL
- Division: East
- Founded: 2003
- Home arena: Joe Mavrinac Community Complex
- Colours: Gold; Blue
- General manager: Jonathan Blier
- Head coach: Dean DeSilva
- Website: klgoldminers.com

Franchise history
- 2003–2005: Manitoulin Wild
- 2005–2011: Manitoulin Islanders
- 2011–2012: Kirkland Lake Blue Devils
- Since 2012: Kirkland Lake Gold Miners

Championships
- League: 2014

The Kirkland Lake Gold Miners is a junior ice hockey club and franchise of the Northern Ontario Junior Hockey League (NOJHL). The team plays its home games at the Joe Mavrinac Community Complex in Kirkland Lake, Ontario.

== History ==
=== Manitoulin ===
Manitoulin Islanders' Logo

Founded in 2003 as the Manitoulin Wild, the franchise changed its name to the Manitoulin Islanders in 2005. They were eventually taken over by former NHLer Reggie Leach and the team started to split its time between Little Current, Ontario, and the Wiikwemkoong Unceded Reserve's Arena. With limited community support and win totals dwindling, volunteers were facing burnout and in 2011, direction was given to team president, Kevin Eshkawkogan to find a buyer for the team from off the Island.

=== Kirkland Lake ===
After eight years on Manitoulin Island, the team had to either move or fold. In mid-May 2011, the NOJHL conditionally approved the move of the Manitoulin Islanders to Kirkland Lake, Ontario to become the Kirkland Lake Blue Devils. In their final four seasons in Little Current, the Islanders managed 17 wins in 200 games played.

The Blue Devils moniker was a long used traditional team name in Kirkland Lake, the most notable team to use the name was the Kirkland Lake Blue Devils who defeated the Calgary Stampeders 3-games-to-none to win the 1940 Allan Cup.

On September 9, 2011, the Blue Devils played their inaugural home game and regulation game in their history. The Blue Devils dropped a 9-2 decision to the North Bay Trappers. On October 12, 2011, the Blue Devils won their first game since relocation 3–2 in a shootout against the Sudbury Cubs. Two nights later, the Blue Devils scored their first ever home win, 5-4 in a shootout, against the Blind River Beavers.

On January 12, 2012, team owner, Robert Kasner, announced that he was folding the club mid-season. The folding of the team happened right after Kasner was suspended by the league for six months for multiple roster violations. Soon after the folding, the league announced that a new ownership group was to be brought in to run the team, keeping the team in Kirkland Lake. The team completed the 2011–12 season under the new name, the Gold Miners.

The Gold Miners won their first NOJHL championship in 2014 when they defeated the Soo Thunderbirds. The Gold Miners then traveled to Wellington, Ontario, to participate in the 2014 Dudley Hewitt Cup where they failed to record a win. In 2014–15, the Gold Miners and the Soo Thunderbirds were fighting for first place all season, but Kirkland Lake finished second and the Powassan Voodoos won the playoff series against Kirkland Lake.

The Kirkland Lake Gold Miners were awarded hosting duties for the 2016 Dudley Hewitt Cup, and lost to the Thunderbirds in the semifinal game. The 2022-23 season marked the first year that the Goldminers did not qualify for post season play.

== Season-by-season results ==
Season	GP	W	L	T	OTL	GF	GA	Pts	Results	Playoffs
Manitoulin Wild
2003–04	48	15	32	0	1	179	245	31	6th NOJHL	Lost Quarterfinal
2004–05	48	14	30	1	3	164	266	32	6th NOJHL	Lost Quarterfinal
Manitoulin Islanders
2005–06	48	8	36	3	1	114	229	20	7th NOJHL	Lost Quarterfinal
2006–07	48	11	30	0	7	138	232	29	7th NOJHL	Lost Quarterfinal
2007–08	50	2	47	—	1	109	311	6	6th NOJHL	Lost Quarterfinal
2008–09	50	7	40	—	3	141	322	17	8th NOJHL	Lost Quarterfinal
2009–10	50	4	45	—	1	131	359	9	8th NOJHL	Lost Quarterfinal
2010–11	50	4	46	—	0	133	347	8	8th NOJHL	Lost Quarterfinal
Kirkland Lake Blue Devils/Gold Miners
2011–12	50	9	39	—	2	138	288	20	6th NOJHL	Lost Quarterfinals, 0–4 vs. Sudbury Cubs
Kirkland Lake Gold Miners
2012–13	48	25	18	2	3	173	145	55	4th NOJHL	Won Quarterfinals, 4–0 vs. Blind River Beavers; Lost Semifinals, 1–4 vs. North Bay Trappers
2013–14	56	43	7	1	5	234	118	92	2nd overall	Won quarterfinal against North Bay (4:0); Won semifinal against Elliot Lake (4:1); Won final against Soo Thunderbirds (4:2)
2014–15	52	38	10	2	2	264	131	80	1st of 5, East; 2nd of 9, NOJHL	Lost Div. Semifinals, 2–4 vs. Powassan Voodoos
2015–16	54	39	12	1	2	247	135	81	3rd in division 4th overall	Won quarterfinal against Powassan (4:2); Won semifinal against Cochrane (4:1); Lost final against Soo Thunderbirds (4:0)
2016–17	56	28	21	4	3	232	190	63	4th of 6, East; 6th of 12, NOJHL	Won Div. Play-in series, 2–1 vs. Iroquois Falls Eskis; Lost Div. Semifinals, 0–4 vs. Powassan Voodoos
2017–18	56	24	21	4	7	163	180	59	3rd of 6, East; 7th of 12, NOJHL	Lost Div. Semifinals, 1–4 vs. Cochrane Crunch
2018–19	56	33	17	—	6	194	156	72	2nd of 6, East; 3rd of 12, NOJHL	Lost Div. Semifinals, 2–4 vs. Powassan Voodoos
2019–20	56	18	32	—	6	154	228	42	5th in division 9th overall	Lost first round against Cochrane (2:1)
2020–21	5	3	2	—	0	20	15	6	Leave of absence	
2021–22	48	12	33	—	3	151	231	27	5th in division 11th overall	Lost first round against French River (2:0)
2022–23	58	7	48	1	1	104	219	16	5th in division 11th overall	Did not qualify
2023–24	58	10	41	5	2	145	294	27	5th in division 10th overall	Did not qualify
2024–25	52	9	39	1	3	117	284	22	11th overall	Did not qualify
2025–26	52	17	28	0	7	147	226	41	8th overall	Lost quarterfinal against Greater Sudbury (4:0)

Source: "Kirkland Lake Gold Miners statistics and history". hockeydb.com.

== Dudley Hewitt Cup ==
Central Canada Championships
Winners of the NOJHL, OJHL, SIJHL, and Host
Round robin play with 2nd vs 3rd in semifinal to advance against 1st in the finals.

Year	Round Robin	Record	Standing	Semifinal	Gold Medal Game
2014	L, Wellington Dukes (OJHL/Host) 1–4; L, Toronto Lakeshore Patriots (OJHL) 1–4; L, Fort Frances Lakers (SIJHL) 3–6	0–3–0	4th of 4	Did not qualify	
2016; Host	W, Fort Frances Lakers (SIJHL) 8–5; L, Trenton Golden Hawks (OJHL) 1–5; L, Soo Thunderbirds (NOJHL) 2–3	1–2–0	3rd of 4	L, Soo Thunderbirds 1–4	—
