= Greater Sudbury Cubs =

Defunct former NOJHL franchise

- City: Greater Sudbury
- League: NOJHL
- Folded: 2026
- Home arena: Countryside Sports Complex
- Colours
- Website: sudburycubs.ca

Franchise history
- 2000–2005: Sudbury Northern Wolves
- 2005–2011: Sudbury Jr. Wolves
- 2011–2012: Sudbury Cubs
- 2012–2015: Sudbury Nickel Barons
- 2015–2021: Rayside-Balfour Canadians
- 2021–2026: Greater Sudbury Cubs

Championships
- League: 2024; 2025; 2026

The Greater Sudbury Cubs were a Junior ice hockey franchise of the Northern Ontario Junior Hockey League (NOJHL). The club folded in 2026.

== History ==
The Sudbury Northern Wolves came into the league in 2000 and were present up until they announced an affiliation agreement with the Ontario Hockey League's Sudbury Wolves midway through the 2005–06 season. The Sudbury Northern Wolves were then re-branded as the Sudbury Jr. Wolves. The team went on to break league records that season. In their first season, the Jr. Wolves won the NOJHL championship over their rivals North Bay Skyhawks. The Jr. Wolves came one goal short of qualifying for the Royal Bank Cup losing to the Fort William North Stars 7–6 in overtime scored by former Sudbury Northern Wolves player, Josh Slobodian.

The Sudbury Jr. Wolves would lose the NOJHL finals to the Soo Indians at the conclusion of the 2006–07 season. The following season, the Jr. Wolves defeated the Abitibi Eskimos and moved on to the Dudley Hewitt Cup in Newmarket, but came back winless. The Sudbury Jr. Wolves last taste of success came in 2010–11 when they went to the NOJHL finals, but lost to the Soo Eagles.

In the summer of 2011, the Jr. Wolves broke their ties with the Sudbury Wolves and elected to change their name to the Cubs. In 2012, the Cubs were sold and changed their name to the Sudbury Nickel Barons and were later awarded hosting duties for the Dudley Hewitt Cup, but they pulled out and the tournament was awarded to North Bay instead.

In spring 2015, the Nickel Barons relocated to Rayside-Balfour and became the Rayside-Balfour Canadians and at the same time pulled out of hosting the 2016 Dudley Hewitt Cup, in which it was allocated to Kirkland Lake. The team was sold to local player agent Adrian Gedye over the spring of 2016.

In 2021, the club was rebranded as the Greater Sudbury Cubs.

The Cubs franchise abruptly folded in 2026. Its ownership cited "the changing landscape of Junior Tier 2 hockey, including the unfettered movement of players, open recruitment from other leagues, exodus of players to Southern leagues for more exposure and the dwindling number of players in the game due to the high cost of participation."

Statistics
Season	GP	W	L	T	OTL	GF	GA	Pts	Result	Playoffs
Sudbury Northern Wolves
2000–01	40	20	15	0	5	204	172	45	3rd NOJHL	
2001–02	42	26	13	0	3	253	176	55	3rd NOJHL	
2002–03	48	28	16	4	—	260	200	60	4th NOJHL	
2003–04	48	31	14	2	1	232	168	65	3rd NOJHL	
2004–05	48	12	33	1	2	159	245	27	8th NOJHL	Lost quarter-final
Sudbury Jr. Wolves
2005–06	48	36	11	0	1	200	139	73	1st NOJHL	Won League
2006–07	48	29	13	0	6	207	166	64	2nd NOJHL	Lost final
2007–08	50	28	17	—	5	216	176	61	4th NOJHL	Won League
2008–09	50	20	25	—	5	207	238	45	6th NOJHL	
2009–10	50	19	27	—	4	186	216	42	6th NOJHL	Lost semi-final
2010–11	50	30	14	—	6	231	89	66	3rd NOJHL	Lost final
Sudbury Cubs
2011–12	50	29	15	—	6	283	229	64	3rd NOJHL	
Sudbury Nickel Barons
2012–13	48	29	18	0	1	186	177	59	3rd NOJHL	
2013–14	56	19	30	0	7	170	219	45	6th NOJHL	Lost quarter-final
2014–15	52	31	16	1	4	203	179	67	3rd of 4, West; 4th of 9, NOJHL	Lost div. semi-finals, 2–4 vs. Elliot Lake Wildcats
Rayside-Balfour Canadians
2015–16	54	28	25	0	1	229	208	57	3rd of 6, West; 7th of 12, NOJHL	Lost div. semi-finals, 1–4 vs. Elliot Lake Wildcats
2016–17	56	28	24	3	1	191	209	60	3rd of 6, West; 7th of 12, NOJHL	Lost div. semi-finals, 3–4 vs. Blind River Beavers
2017–18	56	37	14	1	4	222	139	79	1st of 6, West; 2nd of 12, NOJHL	Won Div. Semifinals, 4–2 vs. Blind River Beavers; Won Div. Finals, 4–2 vs. Soo Thunderbirds; Lost League Finals, 2–4 vs. Cochrane Crunch
2018–19	56	31	20	—	5	194	169	67	2nd of 6, West; 7th of 12, NOJHL	Won Div. Semifinals, 4–2 vs. Soo Eagles; Lost Div. Finals, 2–4 vs. Soo Thunderbirds
2019–20	56	40	11	—	5	260	163	85	1st of 6, West; 3rd of 12, NOJHL	Postseason cancelled
2020–21	10	3	6	—	1	32	42	7	Withdrew from season due to the COVID-19 pandemic	
Greater Sudbury Cubs
2021–22	58	27	17	3	1	171	131	58	3rd in division 6th overall	Lost quarterfinal against Soo Eagles (4:2)
2022–23	58	46	10	2	0	248	138	94	1st in division 2nd overall	Won quarterfinal against Espanola (4:1); Lost semifinal against Soo Thunderbirds (4:2)
2023–24	58	42	12	1	2	285	167	89	2nd in division 2nd overall	Won quarterfinal against Soo Thunderbirds (4:2); Won semifinal against Blind River (4:1); Won final against Powassan (4:1)
2024–25	52	44	6	1	1	252	114	90	1st overall	Won quarterfinal against Iroquois Falls (4:0); Won semifinal against Soo Thunderbirds (4:0); Won final against Hearst (4:3)
2025–26	52	39	8	3	2	298	124	83	1st overall	Won quarterfinal against Kirkland Lake (4:0); Won semifinal against Soo Eagles (4:0); Won final against Timmins Rock (4:0)

Source: "Greater Sudbury Cubs statistics and history". hockeydb.com.

== National championships ==
Centennial Cup
Year	Round-robin	Record	Standing	Quarterfinal	Semifinal	Championship
2024	L, Collingwood Blues (OJHL), 2-10; L, Navan Grads (CCHL), 1-5; L, Calgary Canucks (AJHL), 2-3; W, Collège Français de Longueuil (QJHL), 6-0	1-0-3-0	4th of 5 Group A	did not qualify	did not qualify	did not qualify
2025	W, Grande Prairie Storm (AJHL), 6-2; L, Northern Manitoba Blizzard (MJHL), 3-6; L, Trenton Golden Hawks (OJHL), 2-5; W, Kam River Fighting Walleye (SIJHL), 2-1	2-0-2-0	3rd of 5 Group A	Lost, 1-7; Melfort Mustangs (SJHL)	did not qualify	did not qualify

== Retired numbers ==
In 2016, the Rayside-Balfour Canadians retired jersey number 4 in honour of 19-year-old former defenceman, Sam Oden, who died in a car accident that year.
