= Blind River Beavers =

Junior ice hockey club

- City: Blind River, Ontario
- League: NOJHL
- Founded: 1965
- Home arena: Blind River Community Centre
- Colours
- General manager: Kyle Brick
- Head coach: Kyle Brick
- Website: blindriverbeavers.com

Franchise history
- 1965–1997: Elliot Lake Vikings
- 1997–1999: Elliot Lake Ice
- 1999–2000: Nickel Centre Baron
- 2000–2001: Blind River Barons
- Since 2001: Blind River Beavers

The Blind River Beavers are a Junior ice hockey club and franchise of the Northern Ontario Junior Hockey League (NOJHL). The team plays its home games at the Blind River Community Centre in Blind River, Ontario.

== History ==
The Blind River Beavers had a long history in the International Junior B Hockey League. In 2000, Junior A hockey was brought to Blind River as the Blind River Barons when the franchise moved from Nickel Centre. The team re-branded to the Blind River Beavers in fall 2001. The team has finished as high as fourth on a few occasions and made the playoffs but have failed to advance to the second round as of 2016.

The Beavers introduced a new logo at the start of the 2014–15 season. During that season, the Blind River Beavers set Northern Ontario Junior Hockey League records for fewest wins and points in a season as they went 0–51–1 during the regular season. The previous records were held by the 1991–92 Elliot Lake Vikings, who went 1–47–0 for 2 points. They also failed to win a game during their first round playoff series with the Soo Thunderbirds, losing that series 4-games-to-0.

The team showed improvement during the 2015–16, improving their record to 10–40–0–4, but not enough to make the playoffs as the Beavers finished three points behind Espanola for the final playoff spot in the West Division. The Beavers were led offensively by Max Khull, who had a team high 38 points.

At the end of the season, the Beavers hired Soo Thunderbirds assistant Kyle Brick to be their new head coach and named Dennis Lawrence as their general manager. They also hired several new scouts from the Thunderbirds as they had recently changed ownership. The 2016–17 season saw the Beavers earn their first winning record since 2010–11. Blind River improved to 32–20–4–0 finishing 20 points behind the Thunderbirds and were second in the division. After the regular season, the Beavers beat the Rayside-Balfour Canadians in the quarterfinals in seven games followed by beating the Soo Eagles in five games leading to their first finals appearance, which they were swept by the Powassan Voodoos in four games.

Statistics
Season	GP	W	L	T	OTL	GF	GA	Pts	Regular season	Post-season
1999–00	40	4	35	1	0	110	279	9	6th NOJHL	
2000–01	40	6	33	1	0	121	317	13	7th NOJHL	
2001–02	42	3	39	0	0	106	414	6	7th NOJHL	
2002–03	48	8	38	2	0	163	357	18	6th NOJHL	
2003–04	48	14	31	1	2	172	266	31	7th NOJHL	
2004–05	48	27	18	2	1	208	172	57	4th NOJHL	Lost quarter-final
2005–06	48	13	33	0	2	140	209	28	6th NOJHL	Lost quarter-final
2006–07	48	26	18	0	4	201	180	56	4th NOJHL	Lost quarter-finals, 3–4 vs. Soo Thunderbirds
2007–08	50	25	20	—	5	189	194	74	5th NOJHL	Lost quarter-finals, 2–4 vs. Sudbury Jr. Wolves
2008–09	50	25	21	—	4	188	182	54	5th NOJHL	Won quarter-finals, 4–0 vs. Soo Eagles; Lost semi-finals, 0–4 vs. Soo Thunderbirds
2009–10	50	29	14	—	7	239	205	65	4th NOJHL	Lost quarter-finals, 1–4 vs. Soo Eagles
2010–11	50	25	21	—	4	223	199	54	4th NOJHL	Lost quarter-finals, 1–4 vs. Soo Eagles
2011–12	50	8	40	—	2	117	276	18	7th NOJHL	Did not qualify
2012–13	48	13	27	2	6	178	226	34	5th NOJHL	Lost quarter finals, 0–4 vs. Kirkland Lake Gold Miners
2013–14	56	10	42	0	4	127	281	24	8th NOJHL	Lost quarter-finals, 1–4 vs. Soo Thunderbirds
2014–15	52	0	51	0	1	98	366	1	4th of 4, West; 9th of 9, NOJHL	Lost div. semi-finals, 0–4 vs. Thunderbirds
2015–16	54	10	40	0	4	139	326	24	6th of 6, West; 11th of 12, NOJHL	Did not qualify
2016–17	56	32	20	0	4	214	162	68	2nd of 6, West; 5th of 12, NOJHL	Won Div. Semifinals, 4–3 vs. Rayside-Balfour Canadians; Won Div. Finals, 4–1 vs. Soo Eagles; Lost League Finals, 0–4 vs. Powassan Voodoos
2017–18	56	33	19	0	4	195	155	70	4th of 6, West; 6th of 12, NOJHL	Won Div. Play-in series, 2–0 vs. Elliot Lake Wildcats; Lost div. semi-finals, 2–4 vs. Rayside-Balfour Canadians
2018–19	56	25	24	—	7	201	185	57	4th of 6, West; 9th of 12, NOJHL	Won Div. Quarterfinals, 2–0 vs. Elliot Lake Wildcats; Lost div. semi-finals, 2–4 vs. Soo Thunderbirds
2019–20	56	37	15	—	4	223	158	78	2nd in division 4th overall	Cancelled
2020–21	21	9	11	—	1	82	99	19	2nd in division 3rd overall	Cancelled
2021–22	48	25	17	6	0	151	159	56	5th in division 8th overall	Lost quarterfinal against Soo Thunderbirds (4:0)
2022–23	56	42	11	4	2	244	125	89	2nd in division 3rd overall	Lost quarterfinal against Soo Thunderbirds (4:1)
2023–24	56	45	12	0	1	284	148	92	1st overall	Won quarterfinal against Espanola (4:3); Lost semifinal against Greater Sudbury (4:1)
2024–25	52	34	14	2	2	205	150	72	3rd overall	Lost quarterfinal against Soo Thunderbirds (4:3)
2025–26	52	17	31	0	4	138	210	38	9th overall	Did not qualify

Source: "Blind River Beavers hockey team [NOJHL] statistics and history". hockeydb.com.

== Sources ==
- Haddow, Scott (24 January 2007). "Travelling to Blind River worth the effort". Sudbury.com. Village Media.
- Russell, Rosalind (19 May 2020). "Sports - Blind River Beavers retire Jersey #18 to honour one of its top-notch players". My Espanola Now. Vista Radio.
- "Hockey Talk with Blind River Beavers Coach Brick and Forward Jakob Kovacs". saultsports.com. TruHous Media. 3 January 2022.
- "Blind River players, GM, acknowledged by league". Elliot Lake Standard. Postmedia. 9 May 2025.
- "Blind River Beavers set sights on return to NOJHL playoffs in 2026–27 season". ElliotLakeToday.com. Village Media. 27 August 2026.
