= Timmins Rock =

Junior ice hockey club

- City: Timmins, Ontario
- League: NOJHL
- Founded: 1991
- Home arena: McIntyre Arena
- Colours: Gold; Maroon
- General manager: Sheldon Reasbeck
- Head coach: Sheldon Reasbeck
- Affiliates: Timmins Majors (GNML)
- Website: timminsrock.com

Franchise history
- 1991–1999: Timmins Golden Bears
- 1999–2002: Iroquois Falls Jr. Eskis
- 2002–2015: Abitibi Eskimos
- Since 2015: Timmins Rock

Championships
- League: 2010; 2023

The Timmins Rock are a Junior "A" ice hockey team from Timmins, Ontario, Canada. They are a part of the Northern Ontario Junior Hockey League (NOJHL).

== History ==
The Timmins Golden Bears became members of the NOJHL in 1991. The Golden Bears won their league championship in 1995. In 1999, the Timmins Golden Bears relocated to Iroquois Falls, Ontario, and became the Iroquois Falls Jr. Eskies. After three seasons, the Jr. Eskies re-branded as the Abitibi Eskimos. Attendance improved and the Eskimos played good-quality hockey. The Eskimos hosted the 2007 Dudley Hewitt Cup, but lost the semi-finals to the Schreiber Diesels. Three years later in 2009–10, the Eskimos clinched first overall and won the NOJHL championship over the Soo Thunderbirds, who were hosting the Dudley Hewitt Cup. The Eskimos would finish 4th in the 2010 Dudley Hewitt Cup tournament. The Eskimos never made the NOJHL finals again.

In March 2015, the Abitibi Eskimos announced they were relocating back to Timmins after 16 years in Iroquois Falls. The Timmins NOJHL franchise announced that they were not going to name the team the Timmins Golden Bears, and named the team the Timmins Rock instead when unveiling the team name, colors and jerseys at an event.

The Rock finished their first season in Timmins with a 29–24–1 record, which was good for 4th place in the NOJHL East Division. The Rock swept the Iroquois Falls Eskis in the 1st round of the playoffs, winning 8–1 at home in game one, and 3–1 in Iroquois Falls. However the Cochrane Crunch would be too much for them to handle in the next round, and they defeated the Rock in 4 straight. Jordan Rendle would pace the team with 30 goals, while Zachary Kercz had a team high 55 assists and 81 points. Logan Ferrington appeared in net 35 times for the Rock, and finished with a 20–13–1 record with a 3.94 GAA. The Rock averaged 595 fans per game at the McIntyre Arena, second highest in the league. Kercz would also be awarded a place on the CCM 2nd All-Star Team at the end of the season.

In the 2016–17 season, the Rock finished the regular season with a record of 36–16–3–1 and 76 points, third in the East Division and fourth overall. In the playoffs, they upset the Cochrane Crunch in six games and advanced to the divisional finals where they were swept in four games against regular season champion Powassan Voodoos.

Head coach Paul Gagne retired at the end of the 2016–17 season and Ryan Woodard was named as his replacement, however, in May 2017 he was fired before the season for a non-hockey related matter. Corey Beer was hired as the next head coach in the 2017–18 season. Beer was previously an associate coach of the Cobourg Cougars in the Ontario Junior Hockey League that had won the 2017 Royal Bank Cup. He left before the abbreviated 2020–21 season for the Okanaghan Hockey Academy and the team completed the season without a head coach. Brandon Perry was then hired as the head coach and general manager for the 2021–22 season.

Statistics
Season	GP	W	L	T	OTL	GF	GA	Pts	Results	Playoffs
Timmins Golden Bears
1991–92	48	33	13	2	—	361	173	68	2nd NOJHL	
1992–93	48	42	4	2	—	407	176	86	1st NOJHL	Lost final
1993–94	40	19	19	2	—	190	192	40	4th NOJHL	
1994–95	48	39	9	0	—	303	165	78	1st NOJHL	Won League
1995–96	44	29	14	1	—	206	173	59	3rd NOJHL	
1996–97	40	13	25	2	—	131	222	28	4th NOJHL	
1997–98	40	13	20	7	—	136	210	33	4th NOJHL	
1998–99	40	12	24	4	—	128	189	28	5th NOJHL	
Iroquois Falls Jr. Eskis
1999–00	40	20	19	1	—	171	180	41	4th NOJHL	
2000–01	40	15	24	0	1	171	224	31	5th NOJHL	
2001–02	42	14	24	0	4	165	246	32	5th NOJHL	
Abitibi Eskimos
2002–03	48	23	22	3	—	210	207	49	5th NOJHL	
2003–04	48	26	18	3	1	191	156	56	4th NOJHL	
2004–05	48	30	13	4	1	201	148	65	2nd NOJHL	Lost semi-final
2005–06	48	20	24	3	1	174	190	44	5th NOJHL	Lost quarter-final
2006–07	48	26	16	0	6	177	174	58	3rd NOJHL	Lost quarter-final
2007–08	50	31	14	—	5	224	157	94	2nd NOJHL	Lost final
2008–09	50	29	17	—	4	198	166	62	3rd NOJHL	Lost semi-final
2009–10	50	40	7	—	3	263	141	83	1st NOJHL	Won League
2010–11	50	26	23	—	1	216	217	53	5th NOJHL	Lost semi-final
2011–12	50	28	18	—	4	241	222	60	4th NOJHL	Lost quarter-final
2012–13	48	14	31	0	3	165	258	31	7th NOJHL	Lost quarter-final
2013–14	56	30	22	0	4	212	212	64	4th NOJHL	Lost semi-final
2014–15	52	28	20	0	4	243	233	60	4th of 5, East; 6 of 9, NOJHL	Lost div. semi-finals, 2–4 vs. Cochrane Crunch
Timmins Rock
2015–16	54	29	24	1	0	257	219	59	4th of 6, East; 6th of 12, NOJHL	Won Div. Play-in series, 2–0 vs. Iroquois Falls Eskis; Lost div. semi-finals, 0–4 vs. Cochrane Crunch
2016–17	56	36	16	3	1	271	202	76	3rd of 6, East; 4th of 12, NOJHL	Won Div. Semifinals, 4–2 vs. Cochrane Crunch; Lost Div. Finals, 0–4 vs. Powassan Voodoos
2017–18	56	19	31	3	3	142	184	44	5th of 6, East; 10th of 12, NOJHL	Won Div. Play-in series, 2–1 vs. Hearst Lumberjacks; Won Div. Semifinals, 4–2 vs. Powassan Voodoos; Lost Div. Finals, 1–4 vs. Cochrane Crunch
2018–19	56	33	20	0	3	186	156	69	4th in division 5th overall	Won quarterfinal against Cochrane (2:0); Lost semifinal against Hearst (4:3)
2019–20	56	42	11	0	3	231	100	87	2nd in division 2nd overall	Playoffs cancelled
2020–21	22	18	14	0	0	110	43	36	1st in division 1st overall	Playoffs cancelled
2021–22	48	33	8	0	7	225	124	73	1st in division 2nd overall	Won quarterfinal against French River (4:0); Lost semifinal against Hearst (4:3)
2022–23	58	45	8	0	5	273	111	95	1st in division 1st overall	Won quarterfinal against French River (4:1); Won semifinal against Powassan (4:0); Won final against Soo Thunderbirds (4:2)
2023–24	58	41	15	2	0	272	177	73	1st in division 3rd overall	Won quarterfinal against Iroquois Falls (4:0); Lost semifinal against Powassan (4:3)
2024–25	52	33	16	2	1	272	177	69	4th overall	Won quarterfinal against Soo Eagles (4:2); Lost semifinals against Hearst (4:1)
2025–26	52	34	14	0	4	245	149	72	4th overall	Won quarterfinal against Soo Thunderbirds (4:3); Won semifinal against Hearst (4:0)

Source: "Timmins Rock statistics and history". hockeydb.com.

== Centennial Cup ==
Year	Round-robin	Record	Standing	Quarterfinal	Semifinal	Championship
2023	OTW, Yarmouth Mariners (MarJHL), 4-3; L, Cobras de Terrebonne (LHJQ), 1-2; L, Brooks Bandits (AJHL), 0-9; OTW, Ottawa Jr. Senators (CJHL), 2-1	0-2-2-0	5th of 5 Pool A	Did not qualify	Did not qualify	Did not qualify

== Notable alumni ==
Golden Bears Logo

- Dan Cloutier
- Steve Sullivan
