= Soo Thunderbirds =

Junior ice hockey club

- City: Sault Ste. Marie, Ontario
- League: NOJHL
- Founded: 1999
- Home arena: John Rhodes Community Centre
- Colours: Orange; Blue
- Owners: Trevor Daley; Cole Jarrett; Lee-Anne Jarrett
- General manager: Cole Clouthier
- Head coach: Cole Jarrett
- Website: soothunderbirds.com

Franchise history
- 1999–2002: Soo Thunderbirds
- 2002–2003: Sault Ste. Marie Jr. Greyhounds
- Since 2003: Soo Thunderbirds

Championships
- League: 2009; 2012; 2015; 2016; 2022
- Regional: 2012; 2015

The Soo Thunderbirds are a Junior "A" ice hockey team from Sault Ste. Marie, Ontario, Canada. They are a part of the Northern Ontario Junior Hockey League (NOJHL).

== History ==
Soo Thunderbirds first came into being as a junior hockey program in from 1978 to 1982 through a group started by the late Zoltan Kovacs, Sr. Zoltan, who emigrated to Canada from Hungary in 1956, started the Thunderbirds of the former International Junior B Hockey League to keep more young hockey players at home. Abbie Carricato coached the Thunderbirds during Zoltan's ownership period (1978-1982). The Thunderbirds won three IJHL championships during Zoltan's ownership. The IJHL later folded.

The Soo Thunderbirds announced they would become the Soo Jr. Greyhounds for 2002–03 to establish closer relations with the Ontario Hockey League's Sault Ste. Marie Greyhounds. This only lasted one season and became the Soo Thunderbirds once again.

In 2012, the Thunderbirds won the NOJHL League Championship as well as the coveted Dudley Hewitt Cup. They went on to play at the Royal Bank Cup in Humboldt, Saskatchewan where they lost in the semifinals. The Thunderbirds won NOJHL titles back-to-back in 2014–15 and 2015–16. In 2015, the Thunderbirds would again win the Dudley Hewitt Cup but lose in the finals in 2016.

Following the 2015–16 season and Dudley Hewitt Cup campaign, it was announced that owner, Albert Giommi, had sold the organization to a group called The Tech 921 Ltd., led by former National Hockey League player and Ontario Hockey League coach, Denny Lambert. Following the sale, general manager Jamie Henderson and team president Kevin Cain both resigned. Head coach Jordan Smith was later also assigned the general manager position.

In 2017, the team was struggling financially and the ownership had not committed playing the 2017–18 season. On March 17, local businessman Darren Smyl took over operations of the Thunderbirds in order to keep the team from leaving. However, general manager and head coach Jordan Smith would move on to become the associate coach of the Sudbury Wolves in the Ontario Hockey League. Smith would be replaced by John Parco, a local who played most of his professional career in Europe and had been coaching SG Cortina in Italy. The Thunderbirds also changed rinks and moved into the John Rhodes Community Centre after playing at the Essar Centre. With the ownership change, the Thunderbirds updated to a new color scheme and logo in blue, orange, and white.

In 2021, Smyl sold the team to an ownership composed of former NHL player Trevor Daley, longtime professional player Cole Jarrett, and Lee-Anne Jarrett. Cole took over as head coach of the team and Jamie Henderson was brought back as general manager.

== Season-by-season results ==
Season	GP	W	L	T	OTL	GF	GA	Pts	Result	Playoffs
Soo Thunderbirds
1999–00	40	22	15	3	—	184	145	47	3rd NOJHL	
2000–01	40	33	4	1	2	240	95	69	2nd NOJHL	Lost final
2001–02	42	35	5	0	2	347	122	72	2nd NOJHL	Lost final
Sault Ste. Marie Jr. Greyhounds
2002–03	48	35	11	2	—	305	161	72	2nd NOJHL	Lost final
Soo Thunderbirds
2003–04	48	31	9	7	1	266	155	70	2nd NOJHL	Lost final
2004–05	48	26	17	2	3	206	175	57	5th NOJHL	Lost semi-final
2005–06	48	31	16	0	1	220	165	63	2nd NOJHL	Lost semi-final
2006–07	48	22	22	0	4	170	184	48	5th NOJHL	Lost semi-final
2007–08	50	33	9	—	8	206	145	101	1st NOJHL	Lost final
2008–09	50	35	14	—	1	244	153	71	2nd NOJHL	Won League
2009–10	50	33	14	—	3	253	154	69	3rd NOJHL	Lost final
2010–11	50	38	9	—	3	244	144	79	1st NOJHL	Lost semi-final
2011–12	50	38	7	1	6	245	156	83	1st NOJHL	Won League; Won Dudley Hewitt Cup
2012–13	48	33	9	3	3	223	123	72	2nd NOJHL	Lost final
2013–14	56	48	5	1	2	245	102	99	1st NOJHL	Lost final
2014–15	52	48	7	1	6	271	130	83	1st of 4, West; 1st of 9, NOJHL	Won Div. Semifinals, 4–0 vs. Blind River Beavers; Won Div. Finals, 4–1 vs. Elliot Lake Wildcats; Won League Finals, 4–1 vs. Cochrane Crunch; LEAGUE CHAMPIONS
2015–16	54	47	6	0	1	245	93	95	1st of 6, West; 1st of 12, NOJHL	Won Div. Semifinals, 4–0 vs. Soo Eagles; Won Div. Finals, 4–1 vs. Elliot Lake Wildcats; Won League Finals, 4–0 vs. Kirkland Lake Gold Miners; LEAGUE CHAMPIONS
2016–17	56	43	11	1	1	232	134	88	1st of 6, West; 2nd of 12, NOJHL	Lost div. semi-finals, 0–4 vs. Soo Eagles
2017–18	56	36	16	1	2	195	134	76	2nd of 6, West; 3rd of 12, NOJHL	Won Div. Semifinals, 4–3 vs. Soo Eagles; Lost Div. Finals, 2–4 vs. Rayside-Balfour Canadians
2018–19	56	44	11	—	1	221	145	89	1st of 6, West; 1st of 12, NOJHL	Won Div. Semifinals, 4–2 vs. Blind River Beavers; Won Div. Finals, 4–2 vs. Rayside-Balfour Canadians; Lost League Finals, 3–4 vs. Hearst Lumberjacks
2019–20	56	30	19	—	7	220	166	67	3rd of 6, West; 6th of 12, NOJHL	Postseason cancelled
2020–21	21	13	6	—	2	99	71	28	1st of 5, West; 2nd of 9, NOJHL	No playoffs were held
2021–22	48	38	5	2	3	189	101	81	1st of 6, West; 1st of 12, NOJHL	Won Div. Semifinals, 4–0 vs. Blind River Beavers; Won Div. Finals, 4–0 Soo Eagles; Won League Finals, 4-3 vs. Hearst Lumberjacks; LEAGUE CHAMPIONS
2022–23	57	36	15	3	3	229	161	78	3rd of 6, West; 5th of 12, NOJHL	Won Div. Semifinals, 4–1 Blind River Beavers; Won Div. Finals, 4–1 Greater Sudbury Cubs; Lost League Finals, 2-4 vs. Timmins Rock
2023–24	57	39	14	4	1	265	148	83	3rd in division 4th overall	Lost quarterfinal against Greater Sudbury (4:2)
2024–25	52	26	23	1	2	265	148	55	6th overall	Won quarterfinal against Blind River (4:3); Lost semifinal against Greater Sudbury (4:0)
2025–26	52	32	15	3	2	225	154	60	5th overall	Lost quarterfinal against Timmins (4:3)

Source: "Soo Thunderbirds statistics and history". hockeydb.com.

== Regional championships ==
Central Canada Championships
Winners of the NOJHL, OJHL, SIJHL, and Host
Round robin play with 2nd vs 3rd in semi-final to advance against 1st in the finals.

Year	Round Robin	Record	Standing	Semifinal	Gold Medal Game
2009	L, Fort William North Stars (SIJHL) 0-2; L, Schreiber Diesels (SIJHL/Host) 0-2; L, Kingston Voyageurs (OJHL) 0-3	0-0-3	4th of 4	Did not advance	
2012	OTW, Wisconsin Wilderness (SIJHL) 4-3; W, Thunder Bay North Stars (Host) 4-3; L, Stouffville Spirit (OJHL) 2-10	2-1-0	2nd of 4	W, Thunder Bay North Stars 8-5	W, Stouffville Spirit 5-3; Dudley Hewitt Cup Champions
2015	W, Dryden Ice Dogs (SIJHL) 8-1; W, Fort Frances Lakers (Host) 6-3; OTL, Toronto Patriots (OJHL) 3-4	2-0-1	1st of 4	n/a	W, Fort Frances Lakers 6-3; Dudley Hewitt Cup Champions
2016	L, Trenton Golden Hawks (OJHL) 2-4; W, Fort Frances Lakers 6-5; W, Kirkland Lake Gold Miners (Host) 3-2	2-1-0	2nd of 4	W, Kirkland Lake Gold Miners 4-1	L, Trenton Golden Hawks 0-4

== National championships ==
Year	Round Robin	Record	Standing	Semifinal	Gold Medal Game
2012	W, Penticton Vees 2-1; 2OTL, Portage Terriers 3-4; L, Humboldt Broncos 0-3; W, Woodstock Slammers 7-4	2-2	2nd of 5	L, Penticton Vees 0-3	Did not qualify
2015	L, Carleton Place Canadians 0-4; L, Melfort Mustangs 3-5; L, Portage Terriers 2-7; L, Penticton Vees 2-5	0-4-0	5th of 5	Did not qualify	

Year	Round-robin	Record	Standing	Quarterfinal	Semifinal	Championship
2022	L, Flin Flon Bombers (SJHL), 1-6; L, Summerside Western Capitals (MHL), 1-4; L, Ottawa Jr. Senators (CCHL), 0-4; L, Dauphin Kings (MJHL), 1-6	0-0-4-0	5th of 5 Pool B	Did not qualify	Did not qualify	Did not qualify
