= Soo Eagles =

- City: Sault Ste. Marie, Michigan, United States
- League: Northern Ontario Junior Hockey League
- Division: North
- Founded: 1962 (In the NOJHA)
- Home arena: Pullar Stadium
- Colours: Black, Yellow, and White
- General manager: Bruno Bragagnolo
- Head coach: Doug LaPrade (2018)

Franchise history
- NOJHL franchise
- 1962–2003: Espanola Eagles
- 2003–2006: Northern Michigan Black Bears
- 2006–2007: Soo Indians
- 2008–2012 2015–present: Soo Eagles
- NAHL franchise
- 2005–2012: Traverse City North Stars
- 2012–2015: Soo Eagles
- 2015–present: New Jersey Titans

Championships
- Playoff championships: 2: 2007, 2011

The Soo Eagles are an American junior ice hockey team from Sault Ste. Marie, Michigan that plays in the Northern Ontario Junior Hockey League (NOJHL). In 2012, the Eagles bought the North American Hockey League franchise rights of the Traverse City North Stars and transferred to the NAHL. In 2015, the Eagles sold their franchise rights and rejoined the NOJHL.

== History ==
=== Espanola Eagles era(s) ===
The Eagles were located in Espanola, a small industrial town in Northern Ontario, where they struggled to remain viable and competitive, passing into and out of existence in four different phases. From 1962 until 1971, Espanola played in the Northern Ontario Junior Hockey Association, staying until a year before it folded. Espanola then joined the local NOHA Jr. B league, which would become the Northern Ontario Junior Hockey League, in 1979. The franchise went on hiatus after the 1988–89 season, returning in 1991. The team went on hiatus again from 1995–1998. Its only success came in 1963 when it won McNamara Trophy as NOHA champions. In their last season (2002–03), they won only five games the last of which was against the Sudbury Northern Wolves. At the end of that season, the Screaming Eagles were relocated to Sault Ste. Marie, Michigan. Most players did not follow, and moved on to other teams.

=== Black Bears era ===
As the Northern Michigan Black Bears, the franchise celebrated some of its most successful hockey in years. After three winning seasons and a trip to the league finals in 2004–05, the ownership group decided to sell the financially unstable team.

=== Indians era ===
In late summer of 2006, New York land developer Charles Perdicaro bought and renamed the Black Bears the Soo Indians. Perdicaro hired Jim Capy to coach the Indians. The Indians are made up of players from all over the United States, including players from Minnesota, Michigan, New York, Illinois. Over the 2006 Christmas break, Perdicaro fired Capy and his staff due to "philosophical differences" and hired Kevin Cain to take over.

The Soo Indians went on to win the NOJHL's McNamara Trophy as 2007 playoff champions but were not successful at the Dudley Hewitt Cup.

In the spring of 2007, Perdicaro put the Indians up for sale. Perdicaro failed to find a buyer and were not able to ice a team for the 2007–08 season.

=== Eagles era ===
The Indians were sold in early 2008, and changed their name to the Soo Eagles. They began play in 2008–09.

Capping the 2010–11 season, the Soo Eagles finished with a 37-10-3 record, 2nd in the West Division behind the Soo Thunderbirds; 2nd overall in the NOJHL. Brian Depp, a native of Fenton, Michigan, led the Eagles in scoring with 73 points, tied for 3rd in the NOJHL.

The Eagles began the 2010–11 playoffs with a match-up against the Blind River Beavers. The Eagles disposed of the Beavers in five games, gliding to the West Division Final against their rivals, the Soo Thunderbirds. The Eagles upset the regular season champion Thunderbirds winning in six games in a hard fought series.

The Eagles faced off in a best-of-seven playoff series against the Sudbury Jr. Wolves for the 2010–11 NOJHL title. They won the title in six games. This win put them into the Dudley Hewitt Cup Championship, where they finished third.

On March 2, 2012, the Soo Eagles announced that they were leaving the NOJHL for the Tier II junior North American Hockey League. The Eagles bought the franchise rights of the Traverse City North Stars to make the move possible.

On March 24, 2012, the Eagles played their final NOJHL game, a 4-2 loss to the Soo Thunderbirds in front of a hometown crowd in Pullar Stadium. The loss completed a 4-game sweep of the Eagles in their semifinal series with the Thunderbirds.

Following the 2014–15 season the Michigan Warriors were displaced by the Flint Firebirds of the higher class OHL. With the loss of Flint and previous departures of teams from Port Huron, Detroit (twice), Kalamazoo, Alpena, Traverse City and Marquette, the Soo Eagles became isolated and it was determined to be financially impossible to continue in the NAHL. With the NAHL adding more teams to the East, the Eagles ownership took the opportunity to sell their NAHL franchise to Middletown Township, New Jersey and join with the existing New Jersey Titans organization (which had formerly fielded Tier III teams) and the Soo Eagles team was granted re-admission to the NOJHL.

== Season-by-season results ==
| Season | GP | W | L | T/OTL | PTS | GF | GA | PIM | Result | Playoffs |
|---|---|---|---|---|---|---|---|---|---|---|
Espanola Eagles (NOJHL)
| 1978–79 | 40 | 5 | 35 | 0 | 10 | N/A | N/A | N/A | 6th | did not qualify |
| 1979–80 | 40 | 4 | 32 | 2 | 10 | 203 | 383 | N/A | 6th | No playoffs |
| 1980–81 | 40 | 15 | 20 | 5 | 35 | 222 | 282 | N/A | 4th | No playoffs |
| 1981–82 | 42 | 14 | 27 | 1 | 29 | 207 | 251 | N/A | 7th | did not qualify |
| 1982–83 | 42 | 21 | 19 | 2 | 44 | 234 | 250 | N/A | 4th | did not qualify |
| 1983–84 | 40 | 4 | 32 | 4 | 12 | 211 | 430 | N/A | 6th | did not qualify |
| 1984–85 | 40 | 8 | 28 | 4 | 20 | 221 | 377 | N/A | 6th | did not qualify |
| 1985–86 | 41 | 8 | 33 | 0 | 16 | 211 | 446 | N/A | 7th | did not qualify |
| 1986–87 | 37 | 4 | 31 | 2 | 10 | 169 | 316 | N/A | 4th | did not qualify |
| 1987–88 | 39 | 6 | 31 | 2 | 14 | 172 | 315 | N/A | 5th | did not qualify |
| 1988–89 | 40 | 25 | 10 | 5 | 55 | 274 | 202 | N/A | 3rd | did not qualify |
| 1989–91 | Did not participate | | | | | | | | | |
| 1991–92 | 48 | 10 | 37 | 1 | 11 | 177 | 371 | N/A | 6th | did not qualify |
| 1992–93 | 48 | 11 | 37 | 0 | 22 | 163 | 345 | N/A | 6th | did not qualify |
| 1993–94 | 40 | 23 | 16 | 1 | 47 | 272 | 206 | N/A | 2nd | Lost in Semifinals |
| 1994–95 | 48 | 6 | 39 | 3 | 15 | 173 | 389 | N/A | 7th | did not qualify |
| 1995–98 | did not participate | | | | | | | | | |
| 1998–99 | 40 | 8 | 30 | 2 | 18 | 150 | 281 | N/A | 6th | did not qualify |
Espanola Screaming Eagles (NOJHL)
| 1999–00 | 40 | 4 | 34 | 2 | 10 | 128 | 329 | N/A | 5th | did not qualify |
| 2000–01 | 40 | 8 | 29 | 3 | 19 | 99 | 200 | N/A | 6th | did not qualify |
| 2001–02 | 42 | 13 | 27 | 2 | 28 | 168 | 294 | N/A | 6th | did not qualify |
| 2002–03 | 48 | 5 | 43 | 0 | 10 | 140 | 404 | N/A | 7th | did not qualify |
Northern Michigan Black Bears (NOJHL)
| 2003–04 | 48 | 25 | 17 | 6 | 56 | 199 | 170 | 857 | 2nd, West | Lost in Semifinals |
| 2004–05 | 48 | 28 | 13 | 7 | 63 | 174 | 126 | 824 | 1st, West | Lost in Final |
| 2005–06 | 48 | 27 | 15 | 6 | 60 | 180 | 142 | 872 | 2nd, West | Lost in Semifinal |
Soo Indians (NOJHL)
| 2006–07 | 48 | 31 | 15 | 2 | 64 | 193 | 145 | 1,071 | 1st, West | Champions |
| 2007–08 | did not participate | | | | | | | | | |
Soo Eagles (NOJHL)
| 2008–09 | 50 | 26 | 21 | 3 | 55 | 257 | 209 | 932 | 2nd, West | Lost in Semifinal |
| 2009–10 | 50 | 27 | 18 | 5 | 59 | 224 | 213 | 894 | 3rd, West | Lost in Semifinal |
| 2010–11 | 50 | 37 | 10 | 3 | 77 | 256 | 159 | 846 | 2nd, West | Champions |
| 2011–12 | 50 | 35 | 11 | 4 | 74 | 290 | 171 | 729 | 2nd, West | Lost in Semifinal |
Soo Eagles (NAHL)
| 2012–13 | 60 | 41 | 14 | 5 | 87 | 203 | 152 | 992 | 1st, North; 3rd of 24, NAHL | Won Div. Semifinal series, 3–0 vs. Port Huron Fighting Falcons; Lost Div. Final series, 0–3 vs. Jamestown Ironmen |
| 2013–14 | 60 | 25 | 27 | 8 | 58 | 149 | 187 | 970 | 6th of 6, North; 18th of 24, NAHL | did not qualify |
| 2014–15 | 60 | 31 | 25 | 4 | 66 | 182 | 185 | 1248 | 3rd of 6, North; 12th of 24, NAHL | Won Div. Semifinal series, 3–0 vs. Keystone Ice Miners; Lost Div. Final series, 1–3 vs. Janesville Jets |
Soo Eagles (NOJHL)
| 2015–16 | 54 | 22 | 30 | 2 | 46 | 182 | 197 | 725 | 4th of 6, West; 8th of 12, NOJHL | Won Div. Play-in Series, 2–0 vs. Espanola Express; Lost Div. Semifinals, 0–4 vs. Soo Thunderbirds |
| 2016–17 | 56 | 27 | 26 | 3 | 57 | 222 | 204 | 770 | 4th of 6, West; 8th of 12, NOJHL | Won Div. Play-in Series, 2–1 vs. Elliot Lake Wildcats; Won Div. Semifinals, 4–0 vs. Soo Thunderbirds; Lost Div. Finals, 1–4 vs. Blind River Beavers |
| 2017–18 | 56 | 35 | 20 | 1 | 71 | 222 | 147 | 566 | 3rd of 6, West; 5th of 12, NOJHL | Lost Div. Semifinals, 3–4 vs. Soo Thunderbirds |
| 2018–19 | 56 | 28 | 24 | 4 | 60 | 208 | 185 | 804 | 3rd of 6, West; 8th of 12, NOJHL | Lost Div. Semifinals, 2–4 vs. Rayside-Balfour Canadians |
| 2019–20 | 56 | 30 | 21 | 5 | 65 | 185 | 171 | 673 | 4th of 6, West; 7th of 12, NOJHL | Won div. quarterfinals, 2–0 vs. Espanola Express; Postseason cancelled |
| 2020–21 | - | - | - | — | - | - | - | - | Withdrew from season due to the COVID-19 pandemic | |
| 2021–22 | 48 | 33 | 11 | 4 | 70 | 178 | 148 | 535 | 2nd of 6, West; 4th of 12, NOJHL | Won Div. Semifinals, 4-2 Greater Sudbury Cubs; Lost Div. Finals 0-4 Soo Thunderbirds |
| 2022–23 | 58 | 26 | 27 | 5 | 57 | 206 | 212 | 808 | 5th of 6, West; 8th of 12, NOJHL | Did Not Qualify for Post Season |
| 2023–24 | 48 | 33 | 22 | 3 | 69 | 231 | 202 | 832 | 5th of 6, West; 8th of 12, NOJHL | Did Not Qualify for Post Season |
| 2024–25 | 52 | 32 | 17 | 3 | 67 | 209 | 143 | 605 | 2nd of 6, West; 8th of 12, NOJHL | Lost Quarterfinals 2-4 Timmins Rock |
| 2025–26 | 52 | 23 | 26 | 2 | 1 | 49 | 196 | 200 | 7th overall | Won quarterfinal against Powassan (4:0); Lost semifinal against Greater Sudbury (4:0) |

Source: "Soo Eagles statistics and history". hockeydb.com.
