= Iroquois Falls Storm =

- City: Iroquois Falls, Ontario, Canada
- League: Northern Ontario Junior Hockey League
- Division: East
- Founded: 2007; 19 years ago
- Home arena: Jus Jordan Arena
- Colours: Black, gold, and white
- Owner: Tom Nickolau
- General manager: Paul Gaudet
- Head coach: Tyler Pracek
- Website: ifstormjra.com

Franchise history
- 2007–2014: Elliot Lake Bobcats
- 2014–2023: Cochrane Crunch
- 2023–present: Iroquois Falls Storm

Championships
- Playoff championships: 2 (2011, 2018)

The Iroquois Falls Storm are a Canadian Junior "A" Hockey team based out of Iroquois Falls, Ontario, Canada. They currently play in the Northern Ontario Junior Hockey League and are former members of the Greater Metro Junior A Hockey League. The team was originally known as the Elliot Lake Bobcats in Elliot Lake, Ontario, until the 2014–15 season; where they moved to Cochrane, Ontario as the Cochrane Crunch until their move to Iroquois Falls in 2023. The Storm are the third NOJHL franchise to be located in Iroquois Falls after the Iroquois Falls Jr. Eskis/Abitibi Eskimos (1999-2015) and Iroquois Falls Eskis (2015-17).

== History ==
The expansion of the Bobcats made them the tenth team in the independent Greater Metro Junior A Hockey League (GMHL) and one of six 2007 expansion teams. The Bobcats were Elliot Lake's first Junior "A" team since the folding of the Elliot Lake Ice in 1999. On September 7, 2007, the Elliot Lake Bobcats played their first game, at home, against the Espanola Kings. The Bobcats also picked up their first win as they defeated the Kings 3–2.

On January 1, 2008, the Bobcats hosted the Moscow Selects All-star team in an exhibition game. The Selects won the game by a score of 9–2. This was the third game of seven that the Moscow team played against different GMHL clubs. The Bobcats played against Kazakhstan's Torpedo UST-Kamenogorsk Under-18 squad on January 8, 2009, in an international exhibition game. The Bobcats won the game 5–3.

In mid-January 2011, it was announced that the town of Iron Bridge, Ontario, and its 500-seat outdoor arena would host a regular season game, known as the North Shore Winter Classic, between the Elliot Lake Bobcats and Algoma Avalanche on January 29, 2011. This is the first known regulation outdoor game in Ontario in the modern era. Elliot Lake won the game 8–2 in front of an estimated 400 fans.

On April 2, 2011, the Bobcats won the 2011 Russell Cup Championship over the South Muskoka Shield 4-games-to-3 with an 8–5 victory. The Bobcats were down 3-games-to-1 in the series, but came back with three straight victories to win their first league title. The Bobcats are the first GMHL team that did not participate in the inaugural 2006–07 season to win the Russell Cup.

In 2011–12, the Bobcats finished fifth in the GMHL. The Bobcats played the Bobcaygeon Bucks in the first round of the playoffs and defeated the Bucks 2-games-to-1. In the league quarter-final, their season ended losing 3-games-to-1 to the South Muskoka Shield.

In April 2012, the Elliot Lake Bobcats became members of the Northern Ontario Junior Hockey League, leaving the GMHL after five seasons, two regular season titles, and winning the 2011 championship. On September 7, 2012, the Bobcats played their first game in the NOJHL. They played the North Bay Trappers and lost 8–0. On September 21, 2012 the Bobcats won their first NOJHL game 6–2 over the Blind River Beavers.

The Bobcats moved to Cochrane, Ontario, for the 2014–15 NOJHL season and became the Cochrane Crunch. In April 2015, the Crunch qualified for the league finals by sweeping the Powassan Voodoos in four games to become East Division champions.

On March 1, 2018, the NOJHL announced that the Crunch would host the 2019 Dudley Hewitt Cup, their first time hosting the Central Canadian Junior A championship tournament. On April 24, 2018, the Crunch defeated the Rayside-Balfour Canadians for the NOJHL championship and made their first appearance in a Dudley Hewitt Cup tournament. They finished without a win the round-robin portion of the 2018 tournament.

In August 2020, Ryan Leonard sold the Crunch to former Ontario Hockey League player Tom Nickolau.

On April 29, 2023 the Crunch would apply for a potential relocation to Iroquois Falls. On May 9, 2023 the relocation of the Crunch would be approved by the Northern Ontario Junior Hockey League. With the Crunch relocating, the team would rebrand; changing the name from the Crunch to the Storm. The main reason the Crunch moved was due to poor attendance over their final few seasons in Cochrane.

== Season-by-season standings ==
Season	GP	W	L	T	OTL	GF	GA	Pts	Result	Playoffs
Elliot Lake Bobcats
2007–08	42	26	13	-	3	203	170	55	5th GMHL	Lost semi-final
2008–09	43	31	8	-	4	276	119	66	4th GMHL	Lost Division Final
2009–10	42	35	4	-	3	297	152	73	1st GMHL	Lost semi-final
2010–11	42	38	2	-	2	320	144	78	1st GMHL	Won League
2011–12	42	28	11	-	3	236	145	59	5th GMHL	Lost quarter-final
2012–13	48	15	31	0	2	147	238	32	6th NOJHL	Lost quarter-final
2013–14	56	26	24	0	6	200	203	58	5th NOJHL	Lost quarter-final
Cochrane Crunch
2014–15	52	29	21	0	2	226	188	60	2nd of 5, East; 5th of 9, NOJHL	Won Div. Semifinals, 4–2 (Eskimos); Won Div. Finals, 4–0 (Voodoos); Lost League Finals, 1–4 (Thunderbirds)
2015–16	54	40	10	2	2	298	169	84	1st of 6, East; 2nd of 12, NOJHL	Won Div. Semifinals, 4–0 (Rock); Lost Div. Finals 1–4 (Gold Miners)
2016–17	56	38	13	4	1	257	175	81	2nd of 6, East; 3rd of 12, NOJHL	Lost div. semi-finals, 2–4 (Rock)
2017–18	56	36	17	1	2	233	165	75	2nd of 6, East; 4th of 12, NOJHL	Won Div. Semifinals, 4–1 (Gold Miners); Won Div. Finals, 4–1 (Rock); Won League Finals, 4–2 (Canadians)
2018–19	56	31	20	—	5	200	186	67	5th of 6, East; 6th of 12, NOJHL	Lost div. quarter-finals, 0–2 (Rock)
2019–20	56	26	25	—	5	166	189	57	4th of 6, East; 8th of 12, NOJHL	Won Div. Quarterfinals, 2–1 (Gold Miners); Postseason cancelled
2020–21	21	4	15	—	2	55	122	10	3rd of 4, East; 6th of 9, NOJHL	No playoffs were held
2021–22	48	2	43	—	3	91	270	7	6th of 6, East; 12th of 12, NOJHL	Missed Playoffs
2022–23	58	7	49	—	2	99	327	16	6th of 6, East; 12th of 12, NOJHL	Missed Playoffs
Iroquois Falls Storm
2023–24	58	16	39	—	3	157	273	35	4th of 6, East; 9th of 12, NOJHL	Lost div. quarter-finals, 0–4 (Rock)
2024–25	52	22	26	1	3	161	202	48	8th of 12, NOJHL	Lost div. quarter-finals, 0–4 (Cubs)

=== Playoffs ===
- 2008 Lost semi-final

Elliot Lake Bobcats defeated Nipissing Alouettes 4-games-to-1 in bye round
Elliot Lake Bobcats defeated Deseronto Storm 4-games-to-2 in quarter-final
Bradford Rattlers defeated Elliot Lake Bobcats 4-games-to-none in semi-final

- 2009 Lost Division Final

Elliot Lake Bobcats defeated Minden Riverkings 3-games-to-none in division quarter-final
Received a bye through Division Semi-final
South Muskoka Shield defeated Elliot Lake Bobcats 4-games-to-1 in division final

- 2010 Lost semi-final

Elliot Lake Bobcats defeated Algoma Avalanche 3-games-to-none in quarter-final
Deseronto Storm defeated Elliot Lake Bobcats 4-games-to-2 in semi-final

- 2011 Won League

Elliot Lake Bobcats defeated Powassan Dragons 3-games-to-none in quarter-final
Elliot Lake Bobcats defeated Toronto Canada Moose 4-games-to-none in semi-final
Elliot Lake Bobcats defeated South Muskoka Shield 4-games-to-3 in final

- 2012 Lost quarter-final

Elliot Lake Bobcats defeated Bobcaygeon Bucks 2-games-to-1 in bye round
South Muskoka Shield defeated Elliot Lake Bobcats 3-games-to-1 in quarter-final

- 2013 Lost quarter-final

Sudbury Nickel Barons defeated Elliot Lake Bobcats 4-games-to-3 in quarter-final

- 2014 Lost quarter-final

Abitibi Eskimos defeated Elliot Lake Bobcats 4-games-to-3 in quarter-final

== Dudley Hewitt Cup ==
Central Canada Jr. A Championships
NOJHL – OJHL – SIJHL – Host
Round-robin play with 2nd vs. 3rd in semifinal to advance against 1st in the finals.

Year	Round-robin	Record	Standing	Semifinal	Gold medal game
2018	L, Thunder Bay North Stars (SIJHL), 0–4; L, Dryden Ice Dogs (Host/SIJHL), 0–3; L, Wellington Dukes (OJHL), 3–6	0–3–0	4th of 4	did not advance	
2019; Host	W, Thunder Bay North Stars (SIJHL), 4–1; L, Oakville Blades (OJHL), 2–6; OTW, Hearst Lumberjacks (NOJHL), 5–4	2–1–0	2nd of 4	L, Hearst Lumberjacks, 0–6	Did not advance

== Retired numbers ==
- 22 – Dustin Cordeiro
- 74 – Connor Lovie
