= Hearst Lumberjacks =

- City: Hearst, Ontario, Canada
- League: Northern Ontario Junior Hockey League
- Division: East
- Founded: 1988
- Home arena: Claude Larose Recreation Centre
- Colours: Orange, black, and white
- General manager: Jonathan Blier
- Head coach: Guy Losier (2025)
- Website: Lumberjack Webpage

Franchise history
- 1988–1990: Haileybury 54's
- 1990–1991: Powassan Passport
- 1991–1994: Powassan Hawks
- 1994–2002: Sturgeon Falls Lynx
- 2002–2009: North Bay Skyhawks
- 2009–2014: North Bay Trappers
- 2014–2015: Mattawa Blackhawks
- 2015–2017: Iroquois Falls Eskis
- 2017–present: Hearst Lumberjacks

The Hearst Lumberjacks are a Junior "A" ice hockey team from Hearst, Ontario, Canada. They are a part of the Northern Ontario Junior Hockey League (NOJHL). As the Powassan Hawks, the team won two Dudley Hewitt Cups (1992 and 1993).

== History ==
In 2002, the year after the Ontario Hockey League's North Bay Centennials moved to Saginaw, Michigan, North Bay bought the Sturgeon Falls Lynx. The team was known as the North Bay Skyhawks from 2002 to 2009. In the summer of 2009, the team was renamed the Trappers in the memory of the NOJHA's North Bay Trappers (1962–1982).

=== Sturgeon Falls Lynx ===
The Powassan Hawks relocated to Sturgeon Falls, Ontario to be known as the Sturgeon Falls Lynx for the 1994–95 season. The Lynx were sponsored and affiliated by the North Bay Centennials. This meant, most of their equipment was from the Centennials. The Lynx were the third-best team in the NOJHL, behind the Rayside-Balfour Sabrecats and Parry Sound Shamrocks. Sturgeon Falls managed to make the finals in 1996 and 1997, but lost out to Rayside-Balfour on both occasions. In 1999, the Lynx were the considered the second-best team in the NOJHL after the departure of Parry Sound to the OPJHL. Despite the impressive 1999–00 second-place finish, the Lynx were no match for the unbeaten Rayside-Balfour Sabrecats in the league finals. In 2000–01 and 2001–02, the Sturgeon Falls Lynx finished fourth both seasons.

=== North Bay Skyhawks ===
Shortly after the North Bay Centennials moved to Saginaw, Michigan, the Sturgeon Falls Lynx immediately left the Sturgeon Falls Arena and took up tenancy at the bigger North Bay Memorial Gardens in the summer of 2002 and became the North Bay Skyhawks. The Skyhawks became immediately dominant, and won three consecutive NOJHL championships from 2003 to 2005. The Skyhawks played host to the 2004 Dudley Hewitt Cup, finishing second. The Skyhawks franchise appeared in the league finals five times from 2003 to 2009.

=== North Bay Trappers ===
The North Bay Skyhawks re-branded to the North Bay Trappers for the 2009–10 season. The team's performance did not vary from the Skyhawks, but would not appear in the league finals again until 2012. A year later, the Trappers would win their first league title since 2009 and played host to the 2013 Dudley Hewitt Cup, finishing fourth. As a result of an Ontario Hockey League franchise returning to North Bay, the tournament was almost allocated a second time. The tournament was originally awarded to Sudbury, but backed out. A deal was reached with the city where the renovations would commence at the end of the Dudley Hewitt Cup final. The Trappers had moved across the city to the West Ferris Arena, which was smaller and had under 500 seating capacity. The 2013–14 season marked the last for an NOJHL franchise in North Bay, as a large of majority of the interest was going towards the North Bay Battalion. Owner David Beauchamp was still being bankrolled by former owner Tim Clayden to meet team expenses, after he sold the Trappers and owned the Espanola Rivermen. With the lack of financial means, community support and sponsors, the Trappers ended up leaving North Bay at the end of the season and played their final games in Mattawa. Beauchamp claims the City of North Bay expelled the Trappers, but the city denied this.

=== Mattawa Blackhawks ===
In March 2014, the team announced it was relocating to Mattawa, Ontario to become the Mattawa Blackhawks. Owner David Beauchamp was removed by the league in the fall over unpaid ice fees, and the team was in the hands of new ownership (TPA Sports) from Toronto to continue operations. Because of a small arena, the team's existence was questionable, despite tremendous fan support throughout the season. The Blackhawks finished second-to-last, and lost a best-of-three series to the Powassan Voodoos.

=== Iroquois Falls Eskis ===
In March 2015, the Abitibi Eskimos were relocating to Timmins and the Mattawa Blackhawks took advantage and relocated to Iroquois Falls to become the second-incarnation of the Eskimos, calling themselves the Iroquois Falls Eskimos. However, over the summer the team name was altered to the "Eskis" to pay homage to the Iroquois Falls Jr. Eskis, who were members of the league from 1999 to 2002. The new team did not adopt the former Jr. Eskis' colours of blue and white, and instead went with the Abitibi Eskimos colours of black, gold, and white.

Despite having the third best attendance in the league the team was sold.

=== Hearst Lumberjacks ===
In April 2017, the NOJHL announced that the Eskis' franchise had been transferred to Hearst, Ontario. A new local ownership group led by Jonathan Blier acquired the team from Allan Donnan. The team began play out of the Claude Larose Recreation Centre in the 2017–18 season.

== Season-by-season results ==
Season	GP	W	L	T	OTL	GF	GA	Pts	Results	Playoffs
Haileybury 54's
1988–89	41	6	32	3	—	173	313	15	4th NOJHL	
1989–90	40	4	34	2	—	138	337	10	6th NOJHL	
Powassan Passport
1990–91	40	21	12	7	—	212	175	49	2nd NOJHL	
Powassan Hawks
1991–92	48	33	14	1	—	318	164	67	3rd NOJHL	Won League
1992–93	48	35	12	1	—	370	202	71	2nd NOJHL	Won League
1993–94	40	33	6	1	—	273	118	67	1st NOJHL	Won League
Sturgeon Falls Lynx
1994–95	48	33	12	3	—	237	136	69	3rd NOJHL	
1995–96	44	29	12	3	—	192	129	61	2nd NOJHL	Lost final
1996–97	40	28	11	1	—	203	157	57	2nd NOJHL	Lost final
1997–98	40	22	15	3	—	202	176	47	2nd NOJHL	
1998–99	40	19	18	3	—	167	168	41	4th NOJHL	
1999–00	40	30	9	1	—	236	131	61	2nd NOJHL	Lost final
2000–01	40	21	17	1	1	156	166	44	4th NOJHL	
2001–02	42	19	18	0	5	188	197	43	4th NOJHL	
North Bay Skyhawks
2002–03	48	39	7	2	—	277	111	80	1st NOJHL	Won League
2003–04	48	34	7	4	3	233	110	75	1st NOJHL	Won League
2004–05	48	31	11	3	3	196	122	68	1st NOJHL	Won League
2005–06	48	30	18	0	0	166	141	60	3rd NOJHL	Lost final
2006–07	48	23	24	0	1	164	169	47	6th NOJHL	Lost semi-final
2007–08	50	31	14	—	5	191	152	91	3rd NOJHL	
2008–09	50	41	6	—	3	251	151	85	1st NOJHL	Lost final
North Bay Trappers
2009–10	50	34	14	—	2	227	161	70	2nd NOJHL	Lost quarter-final
2010–11	50	22	23	—	5	183	189	49	6th NOJHL	Lost quarter-final
2011–12	50	29	21	—	0	215	187	58	5th NOJHL	Lost final
2012–13	48	34	7	3	4	215	120	75	1st NOJHL	Won League
2013–14	56	15	35	0	6	154	238	36	7th NOJHL	Lost quarter-final
Mattawa Blackhawks
2014–15	52	13	35	0	4	163	300	30	5th of 5, East; 8th of 9, NOJHL	Lost Div. Play-in series, 0–2 vs. Powassan Voodoos
Iroquois Falls Eskis
2015–16	54	15	39	0	0	163	310	30	5th of 6, East; 9th of 12, NOJHL	Lost Div. Play-in series, 0–2 vs. Timmins Rock
2016–17	56	16	36	4	0	203	282	36	5th of 6, East; 10th of 12, NOJHL	Lost Div. Play-in series, 1–2 vs. Kirkland Lake Gold Miners
Hearst Lumberjacks
2017–18	56	23	30	1	2	215	226	49	4th of 6, East; 9th of 12, NOJHL	Lost Div. Play-in series, 1–2 vs. Timmins Rock
2018–19	56	33	16	—	7	210	159	73	1st of 6, East; 2nd of 12, NOJHL	Won Div. Semifinals, 4–3 vs. Timmins Rock; Won Div. Finals, 4–0 vs. Powassan Voodoos; Won League Finals, 4–3 vs. Soo Thunderbirds
2019–20	56	31	18	—	7	202	177	69	3rd of 6, East; 5th of 12, NOJHL	Trailed Div. Semifinals, 0–1 vs. Timmins Rock; Postseason cancelled
2020–21	12	7	5	—	0	47	41	14	Withdrew from season due to the COVID-19 pandemic	
2021–22	48	35	11	2	0	217	139	72	2nd of 6, East; 3rd of 12, NOJHL	Won Div. Semifinals, 4–2 vs. Powassan Voodoos; Won Div. Finals, 4–3 vs. Timmins Rock; Lost League Finals, 3-4 vs. Soo Thunderbirds
2022–23	58	43	13	2	0	277	155	88	2nd of 6, East; 4th of 12, NOJHL	Lost Div. Semifinals, 2-4 vs. Powassan Voodoos
2023–24	58	36	16	4	2	244	184	78	2nd of 6, East; 5th of 12, NOJHL	Lost Div. Semifinals, 1-4 vs. Powassan Voodoos
2024–25	52	39	11	1	1	258	161	80	2nd of 12, NOJHL	Won Quarterfinals, 4-0 vs. Powassan Voodoos; Won Semifinals 4-1 Timmins Rock; Lost League Finals 3-4 Greater Sudbury Cubs

== Dudley Hewitt cup ==
Central Canada Jr. A Championships
NOJHL – OJHL – SIJHL – Host
Round-robin play with 2nd vs. 3rd in semifinal to advance against 1st in the finals.

Year	Round-robin	Record	Standing	Semifinal	Final
2019	L, Oakville Blades (OJHL), 2–4; W, Thunder Bay North Stars (SIJHL), 3–0; OTL, Cochrane Crunch (host/NOJHL), 4–5	1–1–1	3rd of 4	W, Cochrane Crunch, 6–0	L, Oakville Blades, 0–2

== Notable alumni ==
- Alex Auld (Sturgeon Falls Lynx)
