= Glove (ice hockey) =

Any of various sorts of gloves worn by ice hockey players

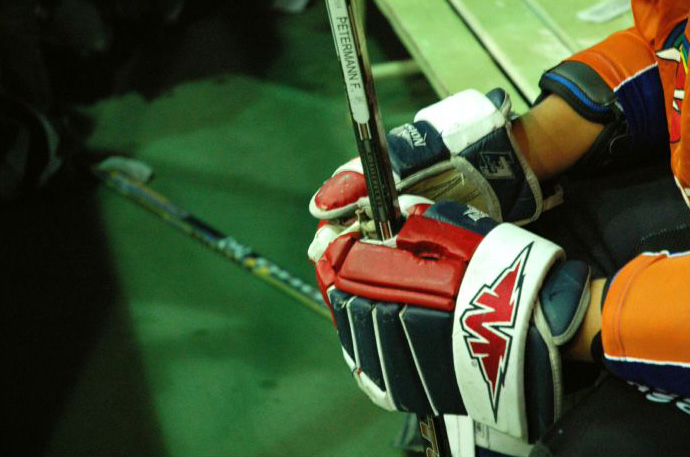
A player's gloved hands

There are two styles of gloves worn by ice hockey players. Skaters wear similar gloves on each hand, while goaltenders wear gloves of different types on each hand.

== Types of gloves ==
=== Skaters' gloves ===
Skaters gloves help prevent the hands getting bruised and battered and stops them from getting burned from the ice. The top padding and shell thumb is designed to help protect the player from flying hockey pucks and opponents' ice hockey sticks.

In today's hockey game, gloves will generally fall into two types of categories, the first being the traditional four-roll style. These types of gloves have more room on the inside, giving it a looser feel on the hand than the natural fit gloves. Hockey players who choose the four-roll style have less resistance in their fingers and hands, so wearing the gloves feels less noticeable. The other category of gloves are the tighter fitting, natural or anatomical fit glove. These have a much tighter fit than the four-roll gloves, and are designed to become an extension of the players' hand. The tapered gloves are tight on the hand, but ergonomically designed for better wrist mobility and range of motion. Hockey gloves also range in sizes, and are generally available in three categories: Youth size hockey gloves run 8 inches (20 cm), 9 in (23 cm) and 10 in (25 cm); Junior sizes are 11 in (28 cm) and 12 in (30 cm); and Senior sizes run 13 in (33 cm), 14 in (36 cm) and 15 in (38 cm).

=== Goaltender's gloves ===
Goaltenders wear a different type of glove on each hand. While these gloves do offer the goaltender a measure of protection, their design is to aid the goaltender in performance of their duties. On the hand with which they carry their stick, often called the "stick hand", the goaltender wears a blocker with a large pad across the back of the forearm, usually extending just beyond the wrist. National Hockey League rules mandate that the blocking glove may be no wider than 8 in (20 cm) and no longer than 15 in (38 cm). The goaltender uses this blocker to deflect shots.

On the other hand, often called the "glove hand", the goaltender wears a catching glove called a trapper, which is similar to a baseball glove. In addition to using it to catch shots, goaltenders can distribute caught pucks by tossing them from the catching glove. National Hockey League rules limit the perimeter of the catching glove to 45 in (110 cm) and the widest part of the glove may not exceed 18 in (46 cm). Most goaltender's glove hands are their non-dominant hand like in baseball, but exceptions do exist.
