= Barrel jumping =

Discipline of speed skating

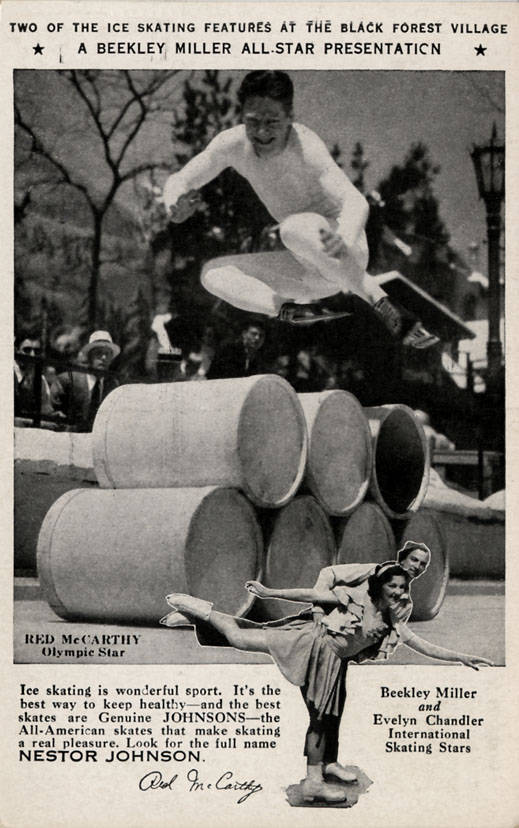
- Canada's Red McCarthy barrel jumping. McCarthy was also an ice hockey player and the co-inventor of ringette
- Highest governing body: Canadian Barrel Jumping Federation
- First played: 1920; 106 years ago Netherlands

Characteristics
- Contact: No
- Equipment: ice skates; barrels; standard barrel: fibre composition material, 18 inches in diameter

Presence
- Olympic: No
- World Games: No

Barrel jumping is a discipline of speed skating, where ice skaters build up speed to jump over a length of multiple barrels lined up, usually side by side like rollers. Occasionally barrels would also be stacked pyramid-style for height. The objective is to jump over the most barrels without landing on the barrels. At the far end, the skaters need not land on their skates. Most jumpers would wear helmets and padding on their posterior to cushion the landing on the ice. At the end of the ice was a padded bumper.

A standard barrel is made of a fiber composition material and 16 inches in diameter.

== History ==
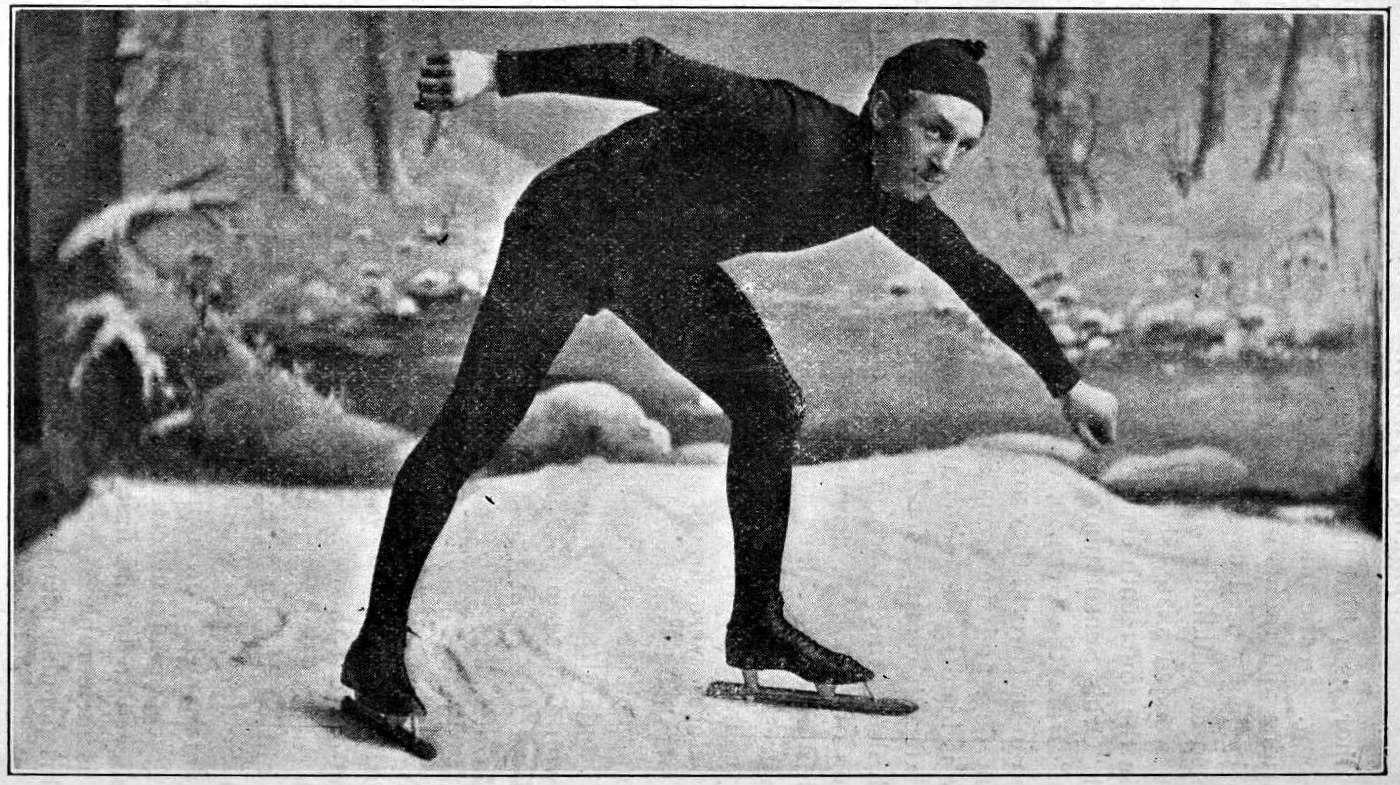
For more than a quarter of a century, American speedskater, Edmund Lamy, held the barrel jumping record, set in 1925, until it was beaten by Canada's Yvon Jolin in 1981

The origins came from Dutch skating races involving obstacles to negotiate by jumping including mounds of snow and beer barrels. The sport started in the 1940s as extra-curricular activity following speedskating races where corners of the courses were defined with barrels. The competitors would then line the barrels horizontally on the ice and compete for jumping distance counted by the number of barrels cleared without contact.

The sport became popular when it was televised as part of ABC's Wide World of Sports starting in the 1960s. Following the 1932 Winter Olympics in Lake Placid, double Olympic speed skating gold medalist Irving Jaffee took a job as Winter Sports Director at the Borscht Belt entertainment mecca Grossinger's Catskill Resort Hotel. One of his innovations was to hold the World Barrel Jumping Championships. When his friend Roone Arledge began producing Wide World of Sports, it became a staple, first broadcast on January 14, 1962. It turned out to be a natural made for TV event years before Evel Knievel would gain attention for distance jumping objects like trucks and busses with a motorcycle on the same show. Localized and nationalized competitions spread. Eventually the world championships would be hosted at other venues.

=== Richard Widmark ===
In 2012, Richard Widmark was inducted into the Northbrook Sports Hall of Fame in Chicago for his accomplishments as a speed skater, cyclist, and barrel jumper. Widmark won two barrel jumping world championships.

In the 1960s, Widmark started a barrel jumping act called the, "Barrel Busters". The Barrel Busters toured ice skating events in a form of barnstorming. For further entertainment value, hoops of fire were added to the performances. The act included Jim Campbell, who was a Chicagoan, and Chuck Burke, who was a Northbrook resident. The skating group traveled across America performing at ice shows while holding down day jobs at the same time. After about 10 years, the Barrel Busters ice show ended.

=== Canada ===
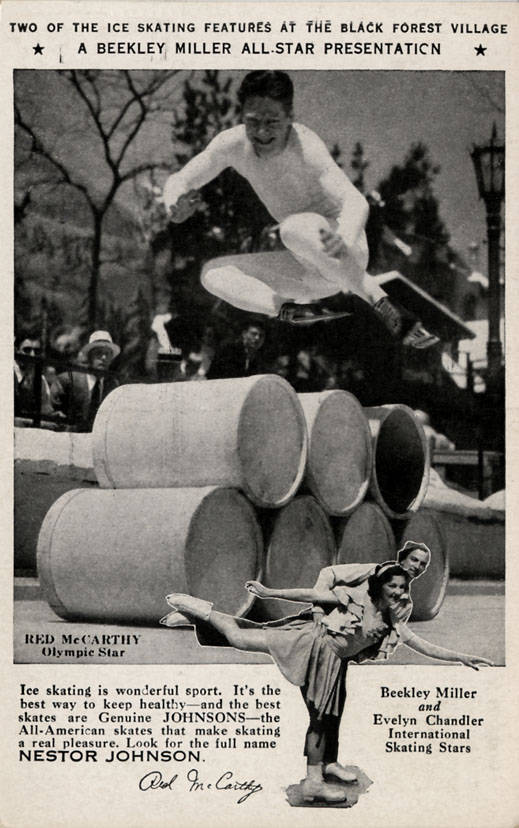
Barrel jumping was eventually adopted by Canadians

After barrel jumping gained popularity in the United States, it eventually gained a following in Canada.

Canada's Red McCarthy, a professional ice hockey player and eventually the co-inventor of ringette, engaged in barrel jumping (pyramid style) in 1933–1934 at the Black Forest Village in Chicago for the Century of Progress, World's Fair (a.k.a. Chicago World's Fair) where he was photographed for an advertisement for Chicago's Nestor Johnson ice skates.

Canada's Yvon Jolin still holds the world record for jumping distance which was set on Jan. 25, 1981.

==== Montreal ====
For a period of time, the city of Montreal, Quebec was home to barrel jumping enthusiasts.

== Records ==
The first recorded record was 14 barrels by American speedskater, Edmund Lamy, at Saranac Lake, New York, in 1925. Lamy was recorded to have made a jump of 27 ft 8 in (8.43 metres). Lamy's distance remained a record until the world record of 18 barrels (29'5" or almost 9 metres) was set by Yvon Jolin of Canada on Jan. 25, 1981. Jolin's record and still stands today and has been recorded in the Guinness World Records.

== Olympic campaign ==
The Canadian Barrel Jumping Federation went to the 1992 Winter Olympics to make a presentation on introducing the sport into Olympic competition but Olympic officials were so afraid of injuries from the sport, they even canceled the live demonstration. Tor Aune, a member of the Organizing Committee said "It appeared to be a brutal sort of sport. Everybody seems to fall on their backside."

"They had a requirement to wear some kind of pads, but everybody kept the pads to a minimum, because you had to lug those over the barrels [when you jumped]."

— Rich Widmark, barrel jumper

Today, the possibility of barrel jumping becoming a Winter Olympic discipline is generally considered dead. Despite setbacks, barrel jumping still has its interested parties:

In this Olympic season I'd like to talk a bit about a pure, backyard-bred, gauntlet-throwing event that many of my generation were convinced was once a part of the Winter Games. It wasn't, but given some of the arcane, deadbeat events of today's Olympiads it should have been. I'm talking, of course, about the barrel jump.

— "Range Rover: Bring back the barrel jump?", Leslie Anthony
