= Espanola High School =

Espanola High School may refer to:

- Espanola High School (Espanola, Ontario) in Espanola, Ontario, Canada
- Española Valley High School in Espanola, New Mexico, United States
