= Edmund Lamy =

American speed skater

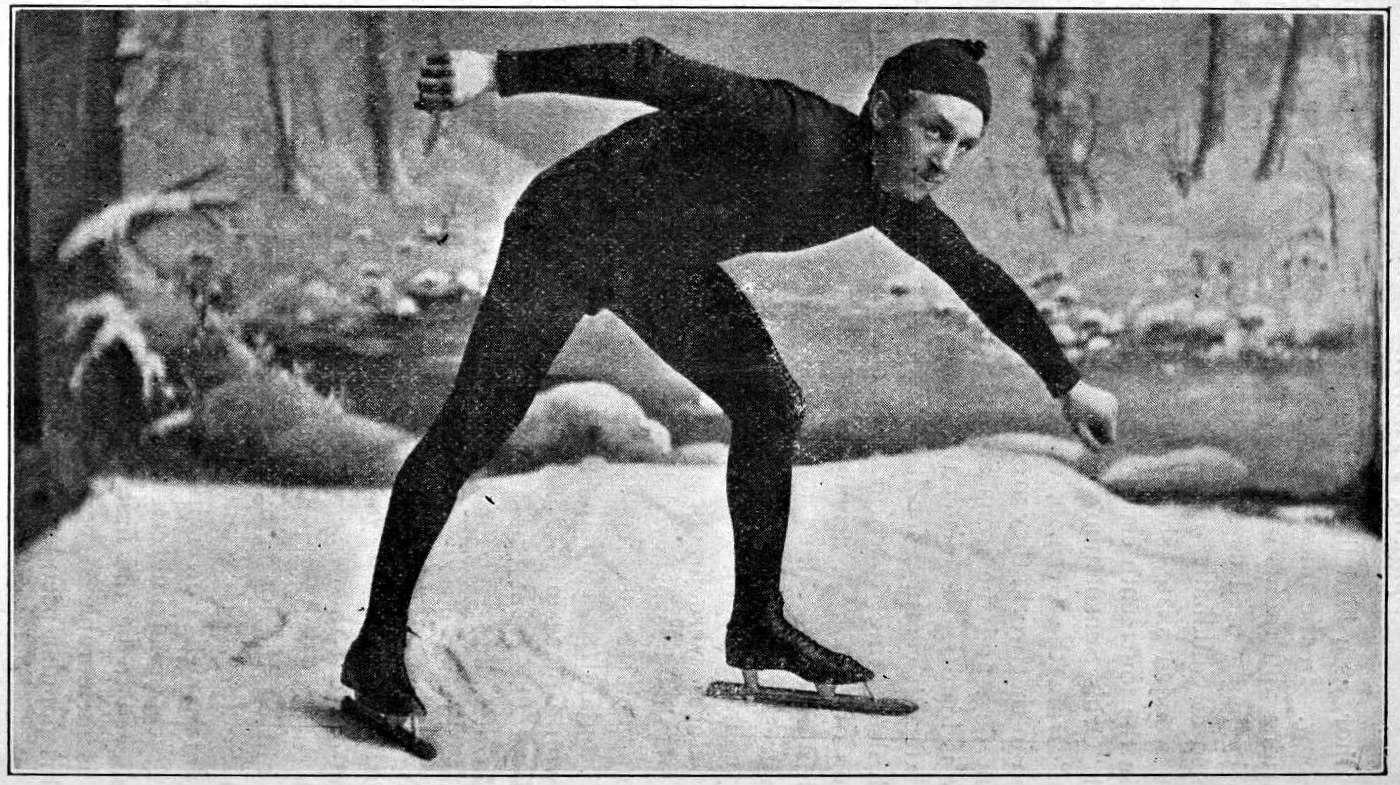

Personal information
- Born: 18 January 1891 Saranac Lake, New York, USA
- Died: 6 September 1962 (aged 71) Saranac Lake, New York, USA

Sport
- Sport: Speed skating

Edmund A. Lamy (18 January 1891 – 6 September 1962) was an American amateur and professional speed skater primarily active in the 1910s and 1920s.

== Biography ==
Lamy first came into prominence on the speed skating scene during the 1907–1908 winter, and was seen as a worthy successor of the former amateur speed skater Morris Wood who turned professional in 1908. In 1909, aged 18, "the Saranac Lake whirlwind", as he was nicknamed, had already taken over the reign as amateur skating champion.

After Lamy turned professional, him and Morris Wood would race against each other in the pro ranks.

Lamy also played professional minor league baseball for the Mansfield Brownies in the Ohio-Pennsylvania League (1911–1912), Charleston Senators in the Ohio State League (1913), the London Tecumsehs in the Canadian League (1914–1915) and the Newport News Shipbuilders in the Virginia League (1921).

He was a speedy outfielder who hit around .300 in his 6-year career.
