= Espanola, Ontario =

Espanola
- Town (single-tier)
- Town of Espanola
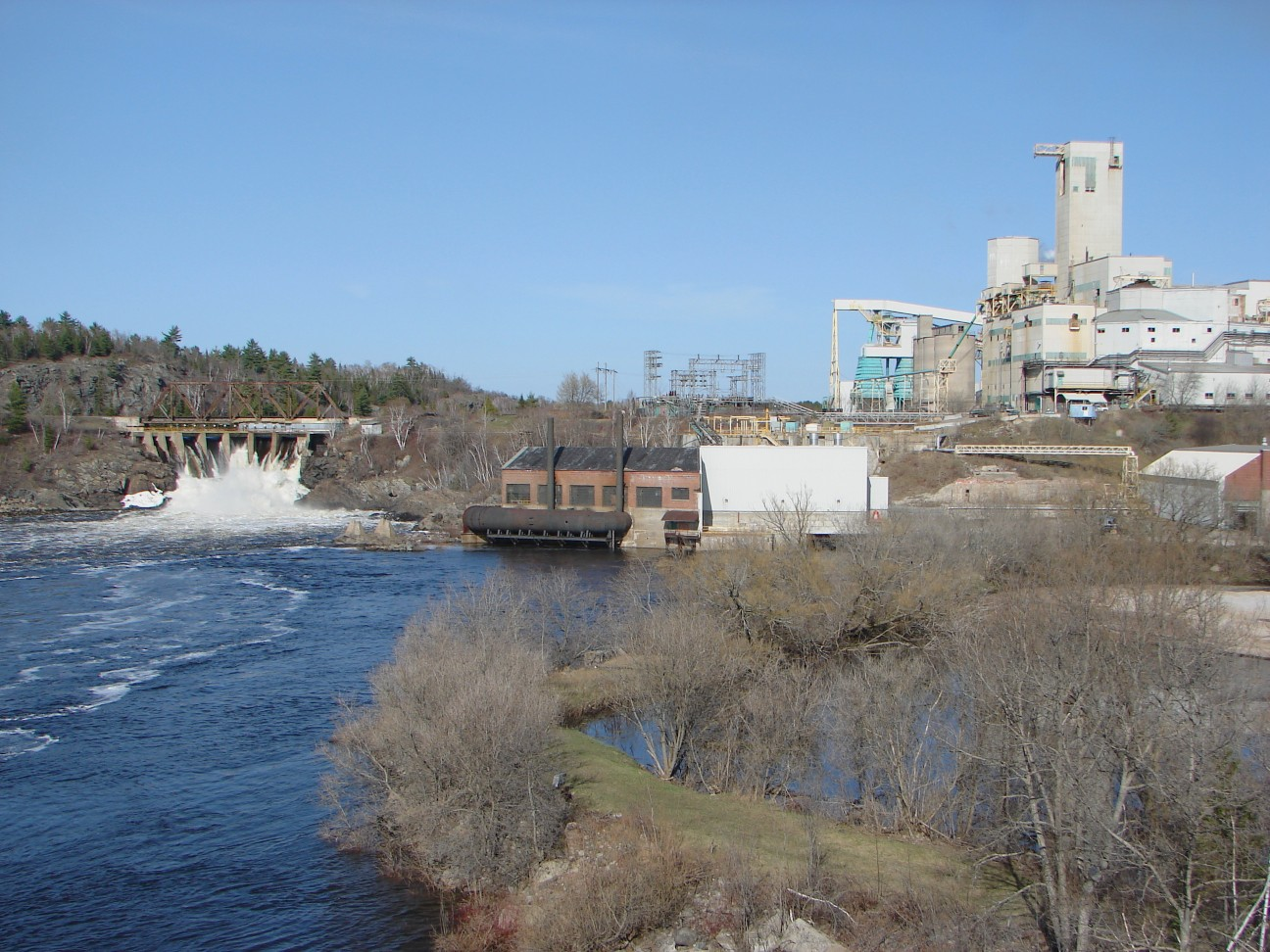
- Spanish River and Domtar mill in Espanola

- Location within Ontario
- Coordinates: 46°15′N 81°46′W
- Country: Canada
- Province: Ontario
- District: Sudbury
- Settled: 1900s
- Incorporated: 1958

Government
  - Type: Town
  - Mayor: Aidan Kallioinen
  - MP: Jim Belanger (Conservative)
  - MPP: Bill Rosenberg (PC)

Area
  - Land: 81.00 km^{2} (31.27 sq mi)

Population (2021)
  - Total: 5,185
  - Density: 64/km^{2} (170/sq mi)
- Time zone: UTC-5 (EST)
  - Summer (DST): UTC-4 (EDT)
- Forward sortation area: P5E
- Area codes: 705, 249, 683
- Highways: Highway 6
- GNBC Code: FBCXV
- Website: www.espanola.ca

Espanola (2021 population census 5,185) is a town in Northern Ontario, Canada, in the Sudbury District. It is situated on the Spanish River, approximately 70 kilometres (43 mi) west of downtown Sudbury, and just south of the junction of Highway 6 and Highway 17.

The town is where the first experimental rules for the sport of ringette were created in 1963 by Mirl Arthur "Red" McCarthy using a group of local high school girls. Today, Espanola is considered "The Home of Ringette" while North Bay, Ontario, is considered "The Birthplace of Ringette" though the title is often shared by both.

== History ==
=== Origin ===
The name "Espanola" has been attributed to a story which dates back to the mid-18th century. The story goes that a First Nations Ojibwa tribe met a man who had travelled far from Spain. The Spanish man, named Frise Espagnol, married a local Anishinaabe (First Nations) of a family living near the mouth of the river and he taught her and their children to speak Spanish. Later, when the French voyageurs and coureurs des bois came upon the settlement and heard fragments of Spanish spoken by the local natives, they remarked "Espagnole", which had been later anglicized to "Espanola", and the river was named the Spanish River.

=== Company town ===
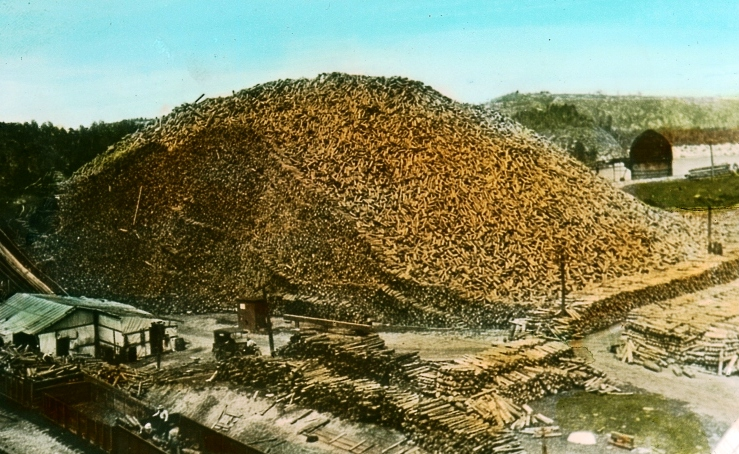
Spanish River Pulp & Paper Company, ON, c. 1927

The town of Espanola was sited next to a waterfall on the Spanish River, which was sometimes called Webbwood Falls. Before the existence of the town, a hydropower dam was constructed at the falls to power the pulp and paper mill of the Spanish River Pulp and Paper Company, a subsidiary of the Mead Corporation. A company town, Espanola, was also established for the mill's workers and their families. The town expanded quickly and was soon a bustling centre with a hotel, school and theatre.

On January 21, 1910, a Canadian Pacific Railway passenger train derailed off a trestle 10 kilometres (6.2 mi) east of Espanola. Forty-three people died from the railcar's 27-foot (8.2 m) plunge into the icy water of the Spanish River. It was one of the CPR's worst railway accidents.

In 1927, Abitibi Power and Paper Company acquired the Spanish River Pulp and Paper Mills from Mead, in a transaction that was subsequently seen to be highly overvalued and having a conflict of interest that was ultimately detrimental to Abitibi's shareholders. Changing economic conditions brought on by the Great Depression forced the closure of the Spanish River facility in 1929.

Espanola became a ghost town until the Second World War, when the mill site became a camp for German prisoners of war. During the final years of the Hepburn government, it sought to stimulate employment in Northern Ontario in order to stabilize its political position. In that regard, it encouraged negotiations between Abitibi and the Kalamazoo Vegetable Parchment Company of Parchment, Michigan, which resulted in the sale of Abitibi's Spanish River facility (at that time its largest non-economic asset) in 1943. It subsequently resumed operation as the KVP Company, producing specialty kraft paper.

In 1948, KVP was sued for nuisance in allowing noxious effluent to be discharged into the Spanish River, and an injunction was issued barring it from making any further discharge. The order was appealed all the way to the Supreme Court of Canada without success. In 1950, the injunction was dissolved by an Act of the provincial legislature, which provided for any subsequent disputes with KVP to be taken to arbitration, which, together with other legislative changes, effectively curtailed chances for any further injunctions to be issued. The 1950 Act was not repealed until 2006.

The 1950 Act effectively gave KVP a limited licence to pollute, and serious cleanup efforts did not happen until the 1980s.

In 1966 KVP was bought by Brown Forest Industries, a division of Charles Bluhdorn's industrial conglomerate Gulf and Western Industries. The Brown Forest Industries operation was later sold to E.B. Eddy, who operated the mill until June 1998. As of 2023, the plant was owned by Domtar, and at the time was the town's largest employer. In September 2023, Domtar announced that it intended to shut down the mill.

Espanola got some negative press in the early 1980s when the mill accidentally discharged toxic effluent into the Spanish River, killing fish by the thousands. The spill acted like a flush, and when the fish came back a few years later, they were reportedly untainted and thriving, although the toxic smell still remained. Now the mill is said to be one of the most stringent "zero-emissions" pulp bleaching processes in the world, and the area below the Spanish River Dam is a designated fish sanctuary.

=== Recent history ===
Espanola was officially incorporated as a town on March 1, 1958.

The 1969 CBC Television series Adventures in Rainbow Country was filmed near Espanola, near the small First Nations community of Birch Island and at Whitefish Falls. The series starred Lois Maxwell, the actress who played "Miss Moneypenny" in Bond films such as Dr. No and Goldfinger. Canadian-born, she was a long-time resident of the town.

In 2001, a group of volunteers staged a fundraiser for the local hospital by attempting to set a world record for the world's longest ice hockey game. They were successful, playing for over three days straight. The record was broken in April 2004 in nearby Sudbury, where the teams played for six hours longer. Currently, the record holders are team Hope and team Cure from Sherwood Park near Edmonton, Alberta, who played for 250 hours (10 days).

== Demographics ==
In the 2021 Census of Population conducted by Statistics Canada, Espanola had a population of 5,185 living in 2,304 of its 2,450 total private dwellings, a change of 2.7% from its 2016 population of 5,048. With a land area of 81 km^{2} (31 sq mi), it had a population density of 64.0/km^{2} (165.8/sq mi) in 2021.

As of the 2016 census, Espanola is ethnically 87% European, 11.5% Indigenous, and 1.5% Visible Minority (mostly Chinese and South Asian).

Canada census – Espanola community profile

	2021	2016	2011
Population	5,185 (+2.7% from 2016)	5,048 (-5.9% from 2011)	5,364 (+0.9% from 2006)
Land area	81.00 km^{2} (31.27 sq mi)	82.82 km^{2} (31.98 sq mi)	82.44 km^{2} (31.83 sq mi)
Population density	64.0/km^{2} (166/sq mi)	60.3/km^{2} (156/sq mi)	65.1/km^{2} (169/sq mi)
Median age	48.8 (M: 48.0, F: 49.6)	48.0 (M: 48.1, F: 47.9)	46.5 (M: 46.0, F: 47.1)
Private dwellings	2,450 (total) 2,304 (occupied)	2,377 (total) 2,215 (occupied)	2,413 (total) 2,267 (occupied)
Median household income	$78,000	$67,738

Notes: 2016 data based on revised population and dwelling counts.
References: 2021 2016 2011

Historical census populations – Espanola, Ontario

Year	Pop.	±%
1961	5,353	—
1966	5,567	+4.0%
1971	6,045	+8.6%
1976	5,926	−2.0%
1981	5,836	−1.5%
1986	5,491	−5.9%
1991	5,527	+0.7%

Year	Pop.	±%
1996	5,454	−1.3%
2001	5,449	−0.1%
2006	5,314	−2.5%
2011	5,364	+0.9%
2016	5,048	−5.9%
2021	5,185	+2.7%

2016 Population figure based on revised count. Population counts are not adjusted for boundary changes.
Source: Statistics Canada

== Transportation ==
=== Road ===
Highway 6 is routed through Espanola, with its junction with Highway 17 just to the north, across the Spanish River in Baldwin township near McKerrow. It also connects Espanola with communities to the south along the way to Manitoulin Island, reaching its land terminus at South Baymouth before continuing on the other side of Lake Huron starting at Tobermory and passing through a number of Southern Ontario communities before reaching its ultimate southern terminus of Port Dover.

=== Rail ===
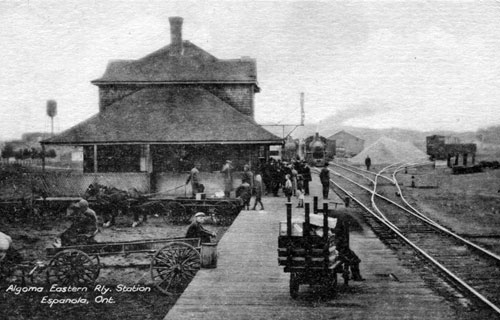
Espanola station c. 1923

Historically, Espanola was a station stop along the Algoma Eastern Railway (AER) and featured a distinctive station and water tower (built in 1911) which were similar to other AER stations such as the one in McKerrow. It marked the first major stop after the AER line turned south toward Manitoulin Island and its ultimate terminus at Little Current. After the financially troubled AER was acquired by the CPR, the portion of the line continuing south from the junction at McKerrow was maintained as the CPR Little Current Subdivision and saw regular passenger traffic, especially due to the difficulties in crossing the Spanish River before a modern highway bridge was constructed in the 1960s. In 1943, the Espanola station was served by a single southbound and single northbound passenger train per day, with a travel time of just over two hours to Sudbury. The approximately 50-year-old water tower was demolished in 1960 as a part of the CPR's final switch from steam to diesel trains. In 1963, passenger service along the spur line was discontinued, though passengers were still able to board CP's iconic Budd cars at the Webbwood and McKerrow stations until service along the Sault Ste. Marie line was also discontinued in 1976, cutting off Espanola's access to passenger rail for the first time in its history. The historic Algoma Eastern Railway station was demolished shortly after in the mid-1980s.

=== Bus ===
In 2018, Ontario Northland announced a major service expansion west of Sudbury, which included Espanola. Passengers may board buses headed to Sault Ste. Marie, or Sudbury.

=== Walking and cycling ===
A segment of the Great Lakes Waterfront Trail runs through Espanola. It approaches the town from the direction of the rural area of Lee Valley to the west. In downtown Espanola, the trail forks, with one section going to the north, where it bypasses McKerrow to the south on the way to Nairn and Sudbury, and the other going south toward Manitoulin, where it eventually connects to the Bruce Trail via ferry to the Bruce Peninsula. Both directions partially follow a paved shoulder along Highway 6, as well as on-street and off-street sections around the town.

== Public services ==
Espanola's three primary schools, A.B. Ellis Public School, Sacred Heart School (Roman Catholic), and École St. Joseph (French Roman Catholic), and two secondary schools, Espanola High School and École secondaire catholique Franco-Ouest, service the local students, as well as those from surrounding communities such as Massey, Webbwood, McKerrow, Nairn Centre, Willisville, Whitefish Falls, Walford and Birch Island.

In 1999 a modern recreation complex was constructed, replacing the aging arena and community swimming pool. In addition, Espanola has a public library.

== Sports ==
=== Ringette ===
The town is where the first experimental rules for the Canadian sport of Ringette were drafted in 1963 at the Espanola Arena by Mirl Arthur "Red" McCarthy using a group of local high school girls who had played ice hockey during gym classes at the Espanola High School.

=== Ice hockey ===
Espanola has had four Junior A hockey teams throughout the town's history. The first was the Espanola Screaming Eagles which were founded in 1962 in the Northern Ontario Junior Hockey Association and won the league title the same year. The team moved to the Northern Ontario Junior Hockey League in 1972 when the NOJHA disbanded and stayed there until 2003 when the team relocated to Sault Ste. Marie, Michigan where they are now known as the Soo Eagles in the same league.

The town's second team was the Espanola Kings which were founded in 2007 in the Greater Metro Junior A Hockey League. However, the team only lasted two season before folding after the 2008-2009 season.

The third team was the Espanola Rivermen which were founded in 2013 in the NOJHL. However, the team lasted one season in the league before relocating to the newly formed Canadian International Hockey League. The team folded in 2015 after the league disbanded after one season.

The fourth team is the Espanola Paper Kings which were founded in 2015 in the NOJHL. The team is still active in the league today.

== Media ==
=== Radio ===
Frequency	Call sign	Branding	Format	Owner	Notes
FM 94.1	CKNR-FM	Moose FM	Adult contemporary	Vista Broadcast Group	
FM 94.9	CBON-FM-7	Ici Radio-Canada Première	Talk radio, public radio	Canadian Broadcasting Corporation	Rebroadcaster of CBON-FM Sudbury
FM 99.3	CJJM	Moose FM	Variety	Vista Broadcast Group	

Other radio station signals are received out of Manitoulin Island, Elliot Lake and Sudbury.

=== Defunct Radio stations ===
- AM 930 CKNS - Launched on October 2, 1976. Left the air to be replaced by CKNR-FM in 1997.
- AM 1240 CBLP - Launched as a local community-owned radio station in September 1971 by the Espanola Community Radio Citizens Committee using a low-power 40 watt AM transmitter. Originally broadcast local material with some CBC programming; it's uncertain when the local programming was discontinued. Replaced in the 1980s by CBCE-FM, a CBC rebroadcaster in Little Current, which covered Espanola, Manitoulin Island, and some other areas of the North Shore.

=== Television ===
Former television stations which operated in the Espanola and area prior to the analog shutdown in 2012 which can only be received via cable or satellite:

OTA channel	Call sign	Network	Notes
4	CBLFT-TV-7	Radio-Canada	Was a low-power rebroadcaster of CBLFT-TV Toronto (Formerly CBFST-TV-4 and formerly on channel 11).
49	CICO-TV-71	TVOntario	(Lee Valley) - Was a low-power rebroadcaster of TVO Toronto

One of the last operating analog television signals which can reach the Espanola area is CICI-TV (CTV) channel 5 out of Sudbury.

=== Print ===
Espanola is home to the Mid-North Monitor, a weekly community newspaper.

== In popular culture ==
Espanola is a pivotal location in The Marrow Thieves, a young adult novel written by Cherie Dimaline.

== Notable people and residents ==
- Art Gauthier, professional hockey player.
- Leo Lamoureux, professional hockey player.
- Al Secord, professional hockey player.
- Mirl Arthur "Red" McCarthy became the co-founder of the sport of ringette in 1963 while he was the area's recreation director.
- Greg Duhaime, record-setting Canadian steeplechaser.
- Jim Gordon, former mayor of Sudbury, politician.
- Lois Maxwell, played Miss Moneypenny in the James Bond films and starred in Adventures in Rainbow Country.

== See also ==
- List of towns in Ontario
- List of townships in Ontario
- List of francophone communities in Ontario
- List of population centres in Ontario
- List of municipalities in Ontario
