= Espanola Eagles =

- City: Espanola, Ontario, Canada
- League: Northern Ontario Junior Hockey League; Northern Ontario Junior Hockey Association
- Operated: 1962–2003
- Home arena: Espanola Regional Recreation Complex Arena
- Colours: Black and White

Franchise history
- 1962–2003: Espanola Eagles
- 2003–2006: Northern Michigan Black Bears
- 2006–2007: Soo Indians
- 2008–2012: Soo Eagles
- 2015–present: New Jersey Junior Titans

Championships
- Playoff championships: 1: 1963

The Espanola Eagles (aka Espanola Screaming Eagles) were a Canadian Junior ice hockey team. The team was coached for eighteen years by Red McCarthy who then managed it for another four. The Eagles were located in Espanola, Ontario and played in the Memorial Cup-eligible Northern Ontario Junior Hockey Association and later the Centennial Cup-eligible Northern Ontario Junior Hockey League.

The Eagles played from 1962 until 2003 when their franchise was bought by interests in Michigan and relocated. The team was renamed the Northern Michigan Black Bears. The Bears existed from 2003–2006, then became the Soo Indians from 2008–2012. The team was then renamed again and from 2012–2015 was known as the Soo Eagles. From 2015 to the present, the team has been known as the New Jersey Junior Titans.

== Season-by-season results ==
Season	GP	W	L	T	OTL	GF	GA	P	Results	Playoffs
1962–63	40	25	14	1	-	197	143	51	2nd NOJHA	Won League
1963–64	40	25	14	1	-	216	157	51	3rd NOJHA	Lost semi-final
1964–65	40	22	17	1	-	185	195	45	3rd NOJHA	Lost semi-final
1965–66	40	21	19	0	-	227	221	42	4th NOJHA	Lost semi-final
1966–67	40	3	37	0	-	121	355	6	5th NOJHA	DNQ
1967–68	40	9	30	1	-	139	226	19	5th NOJHA	DNQ
1968–69	48	9	37	2	-	147	285	20	5th NOJHA	DNQ
1969–70	48	16	30	2	-	215	265	34	4th NOJHA	Lost semi-final
1970–71	48	10	36	2	-	154	317	22	5th NOJHA	DNQ
1971–72	40	18	18	4	-	--	--	40	3rd NOHA Jr. B	Lost semi-final
1972–73	42	14	27	1	-	--	--	29	7th NOHA Jr. B	Lost quarter-final
1973–74	40	16	22	2	-	231	270	34	4th NOHA Jr. B	Lost semi-final
1974–75									NOHA Jr. B	Lost quarter-final
1975–76									5th NOHA Jr. B	DNQ
1976–77									5th NOHA Jr. B	Lost quarter-final
1977–78								25	5th NOHA Jr. B	Lost quarter-final
1978–79	40	5	35	0	-	--	--	10	6th NOJHL	
1979–80	40	4	34	2	-	203	383	10	6th NOJHL	
1980–81	40	15	20	5	-	222	282	35	4th NOJHL	
1981–82	42	14	27	1	-	207	251	29	7th NOJHL	
1982–83	42	21	19	2	-	234	250	44	4th NOJHL	
1983–84	40	4	32	4	-	211	430	10	6th NOJHL	
1984–85	40	8	28	4	-	221	377	20	6th NOJHL	
1985–86	41	8	33	0	-	211	446	16	7th NOJHL	
1986–87	37	4	31	2	-	169	316	10	4th NOJHL	
1987–88	39	6	31	2	-	172	315	14	5th NOJHL	
1988–91	Franchise on Hiatus									
1991–92	48	10	37	1	-	177	371	21	6th NOJHL	
1992–93	48	11	37	0	-	163	345	22	6th NOJHL	
1993–94	40	23	16	1	-	272	206	47	2nd NOJHL	
1994–95	48	6	39	3	-	173	389	15	7th NOJHL	
1995–98	Franchise on Hiatus									
1998–99	40	8	30	2	-	150	281	18	6th NOJHL	
1999–00	40	4	34	2	-	128	329	10	5th NOJHL	
2000–01	40	8	29	1	2	99	200	19	6th NOJHL	
2001–02	42	13	27	0	2	168	294	28	6th NOJHL	
2002–03	48	5	43	0	-	140	404	10	7th NOJHL	
