= Red McCarthy =

Canadian co-inventor of ringette, recreation director, ice hockey player (1930–1995)

Mirl Arthur "Red" McCarthy
- Mirl "Red" McCarthy; Founder of ringette
- Born: Mirl Arthur McCarthy; March 12, 1930; Sturgeon Falls, Ontario, Canada
- Died: 1995 (aged 64–65)
- Other names: "Red McCarthy"
- Occupation(s): Sportsman, coach
- Years active: 1949–54; professional ice hockey; 1954–95; recreation director
- Known for: Founder of ringette; Director of recreation and sport; Member of NORDA (Northern Ontario Recreation Directors Association); Ice hockey player; Sports coach; Espanola Eagles coach - 18 years; Barrel jumper at the Chicago World's Fair, 1933–1934
- Height: 5 ft 11 in (180 cm)

Mirl Arthur "Red" McCarthy (March 12, 1930 – 1995) was a Canadian sportsperson, sport and recreation administrator, ice hockey player, founder and co-inventor of the sport of ringette, and for a time, a professional skating star and barrel jumper. He was inducted into the Ringette Canada Hall of Fame as a Founder in 1998.

== Biography ==
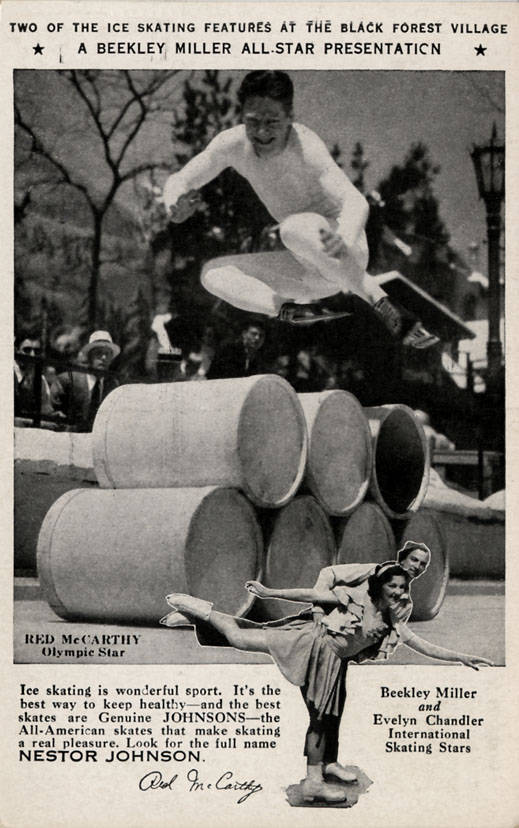
"Red McCarthy on Ice" - performing barrel jumping. Postcard: 1933 Century of Progress, Exposition Chicago, Black Forest Village Ice Skating

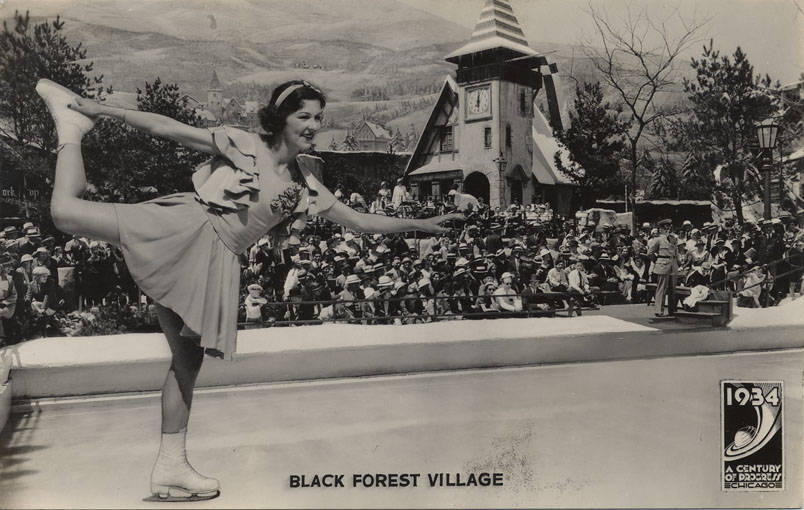
Black Forest Village at Chicago's Century of Progress, 1934 advertisement

Born in Sturgeon Falls, Ontario and raised in Sudbury, he grew up to be a star athlete in baseball, football, track and field, and ice hockey. His hockey career included stops with Toronto St. Michael's College, Barrie Flyers, Boston Olympics, Nelson B.C. Maple Leafs, Sudbury Caruso Miners, and Sudbury Wolves of the Canadian Senior Hockey League. McCarthy played in three ice hockey leagues over the course of his career: the Ontario Hockey League, the Eastern Amateur Hockey League, and the Northern Ontario Hockey Association.

At the Chicago World's Fair, in Chicago, Illinois, United States, McCarthy was photographed participating in barrel jumping, a discipline of speed skating, at the Black Forest Village.

In 1954, at the age of 24, he became recreation director of Espanola, Ontario and held the position for forty-one years. He became actively involved in all aspects of Espanola's recreational programs and was instrumental in forming the Northern Ontario Hockey Association (NOHA) Junior A Hockey League, and the Espanola Eagles Junior A hockey team. He coached the team for 18 years, and then managed it for four more. The Northern Ontario Junior Hockey League's Red McCarthy Memorial Trophy is named in his honour.

=== Ringette ===
McCarthy, a member of the Northern Ontario Recreation Directors Association (NORDA), set up the first on-ice activity, or "game", of ringette which took place at the Espanola Arena in the fall of 1963. He drew up the first set of rules and set up the very first game between Espanola high school girls who had played high school ice hockey.

The first ring we used was a felt floor hockey ring, but we found it collected snow easily, so a deck tennis ring was used, which worked much better.

— Norm Mayer, The origins of ringette, Sudbury Star (1989)

McCarthy had been present at a meeting when Sam Jacks brought up the fact that there was a need for a new winter team sport for girls. After Jacks's presentation, McCarthy volunteered to experiment with the new sport in Espanola where he was the recreation director and arena manager. Equipped with Jack's basic idea, McCarthy then created the first set of rules for the sport of ringette. These rules were then presented at a NORDA meeting at Moose Lake Lodge in Onaping, Ontario, on January 19–20, 1964. Today the title of "birthplace of ringette" is shared by both North Bay, Ontario, and Espanola, Ontario, though Espanola is still recognized as the "Official Home of Ringette". To date, McCarthy has not had a trophy or any other award in the sport named in his honour.

== Mirl "Red" McCarthy Memorial Award ==
The Red McCarthy Memorial Trophy is the Northern Ontario Junior Hockey League's award given annually to the "Coach of the Year".

MIRL "RED" MCCARTHY MEMORIAL AWARD NOJHL Coach of the year
Season	Coach of the Year	Team
2022–23	Peter Goulet	Powassan Voodoos
2021–22	Brandon Perry	Timmins Rock
2020–21	COVID-19 pandemic
2019–2000	Dave Clancy	Espanola Express
2018–19	Marc Lafleur	Hearst Lumberjacks
2017–18	John Parco	Soo Thunderbirds
2016-17	Kyle Brick	Blind River Beavers
2015–16	Ryan Leonard	Cochrane Crunch
2014–15	Jordan Smith	Soo Thunderbirds
2013–14	Jordan Smith	Soo Thunderbirds
2012–13	Marc Lafleur	Kirkland Lake Gold Miners
2011–12	Tom McCarthy	North Bay Trappers (now the Hearst Lumberjacks)
2010–11	Bruno Bragagnolo	Soo Eagles
2009–2010	Paul Gagné	Abitibi Eskimos (now the Timmins Rock)
2008–09	Ian Swalucynski	North Bay Skyhawks (now the Hearst Lumberjacks)
2007–08	Paul Gagné	Abitibi Eskimos
2006–07	Todd Stencill	Blind River Beavers
2005–06	Darryl Moxam	Sudbury Northern Wolves (now the Greater Sudbury Cubs)
2004–05	Toots Kovacs	Soo Thunderbirds
2003–04	Paul Gagné	Abitibi Eskimos
2002–03	Paul Gagné	Abitibi Eskimos
2001–02	Paul Gagné	Iroquois Falls Jr. Eskies (now the Timmins Rock)
2000–01	Jim Capy	Soo Thunderbirds
1999–2000	Ken MacKenzie	Rayside-Balfour Sabrecats
1998–99	Ron Guy	Parry Sound Shamrocks
1997–98	Ken MacKenzie	Rayside-Balfour Sabrecats
1996–97	Ken MacKenzie	Rayside-Balfour Sabrecats
1995–96	Jeff Brick	Rayside-Balfour Sabrecats
1994–95	Kenn Sullivan	Timmins Golden Bears
1993–94	Guy Blanchard	Powassan Hawks
1992–93	Kenn Sullivan	Timmins Golden Bears
1991–92	Guy Blanchard	Powassan Passports
1990–91	Guy Blanchard	Powassan Passports
1989–1990	Brian Smith	Sudbury Cubs
1988–89	Not Available	N/A
1987–88	Not Available	N/A
1986–87	Not Available	N/A
1985–86	Not Available	N/A
1984–85	Not Available	N/A
1983–84	Not Available	N/A
1982–83	Not Available	N/A
1981–82	Ken MacKenzie	Onaping Falls Huskies
1980–81	Richard Pagnutti	Nickel Centre Native Sons
1979–1980	Pat Tremblay	Onaping Falls Huskies
1978–79	John Dediana	Nickel Centre Native Sons
1977–78	No League	N/L
1976–77	No League	N/L
1975–76	No League	N/L
1974–75	No League	N/L
1973–74	No League	N/L
1972–73	No League	N/L
1971–72	Ab Carricato	Soo Greyhounds
1970–71	Ab Carricato	Soo Greyhounds
1969–1970	Marcel Clements	Sudbury Wolves
1968–69	Walter Dubas	Soo Greyhounds
1967–68	Walter Dubas	Soo Greyhounds
1966–67	Walter Dubas	Soo Greyhounds
1965–66	Red McCarthy	Espanola Eagles
1964–65	Howie Parker	North Bay Trappers (now the Hearst Lumberjacks)
1963–64	Howie Parker	North Bay Trappers (now the Hearst Lumberjacks)
1962–63	Red McCarthy	Espanola Eagles

== Honours ==
- Ringette Canada Hall of Fame - Founder (Inducted 1988)
- Sudbury Sport Hall of Fame (2007, inducted posthumously)
- Mirl "Red" McCarthy Memorial Trophy - awarded to top Coach in Northern Ontario Junior Hockey League
- Recreational Director of Espanola, Ontario for 41 years.
- Athletic complex in Espanola named the "Red McCarthy Memorial Athletic Fields".
- Ringette is one of four sports featured on the "Canadian Inventions: Sports" series issued by Canada Post stamps on August 10, 2009.

== See also ==
- Sam Jacks
- Ringette
- Ringette in Canada
