= Morris Wood =

American speed skater (1882–1967)

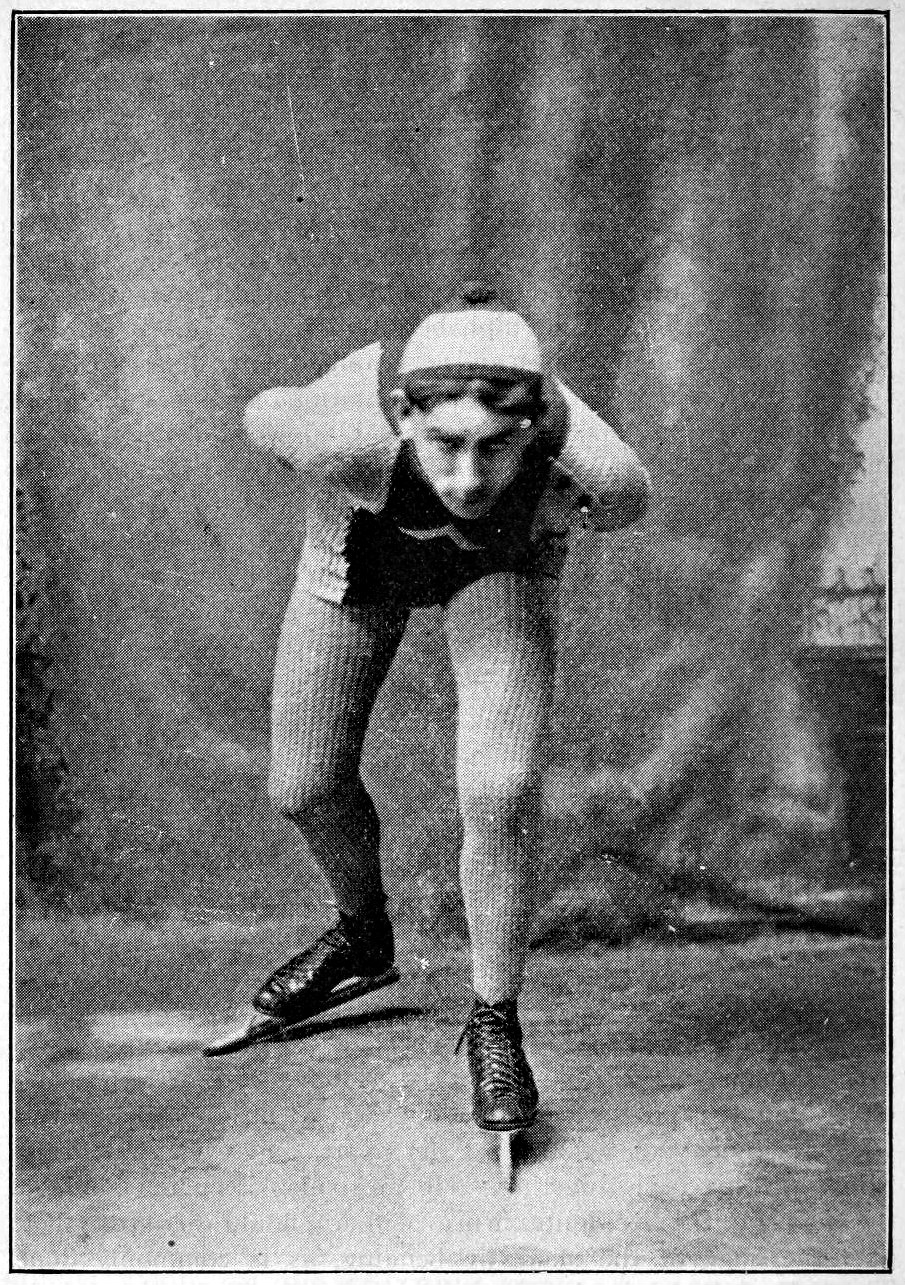

Personal information
- Born: January 28, 1882 Long Branch, New Jersey, US
- Died: May 17, 1967 (aged 85) Long Branch, New Jersey, US

Sport
- Sport: Speed skating
- Club: Verona Lake Skating Club

Morris "Mott" Wood (January 28, 1882 – May 17, 1967) was an American amateur and professional speed skater primarily active during the first decade of the 20th century.

== Biography ==
Morris Wood learned to skate on the Shrewsbury River near his hometown of Long Branch, New Jersey and at the age of 15 he had already earned a reputation among his associates as a speedy skater. He would go on to hold several amateur national championship titles. In January 1904, at Verona Lake near Montclair, New Jersey, Wood won in one afternoon the half, mile, and five-mile championships of the National Amateur Skating Association.

Wood describing some of the technical and tactical aspects of his sport in March 1905:

"You have got to be fast, of course, and you must have a lot of sand in your make-up to be a good skater. Then again there are many tricks in skating and you must be up to every one of them in order to hold your own. The casual observer of a skating race very rarely sees the fine points of the contest. You take your strides so quickly that a spectator fails to see a tricky rival lift his foot a trifle high just when he knows you are taking a new stroke. Unless you are very careful in a case like this you will invariably trip and the miscreant will, in nine cases out of ten, escape without a fall. A champion is invariably under a disadvantage and this is probably so in any sport, for the competitors sometimes, even without prearranged plans, will naturally prepare a pocket for the one they most fear, and a successful pocket will always beat you. That is one of the reasons I insist on leading. In that case I can't be tripped and I can't be pocketed, and if I lose it is by my own fault. I am having my day now, but I suppose it will soon shift to some other man and I will go the way of the rest of the champions, beaten and forgotten."

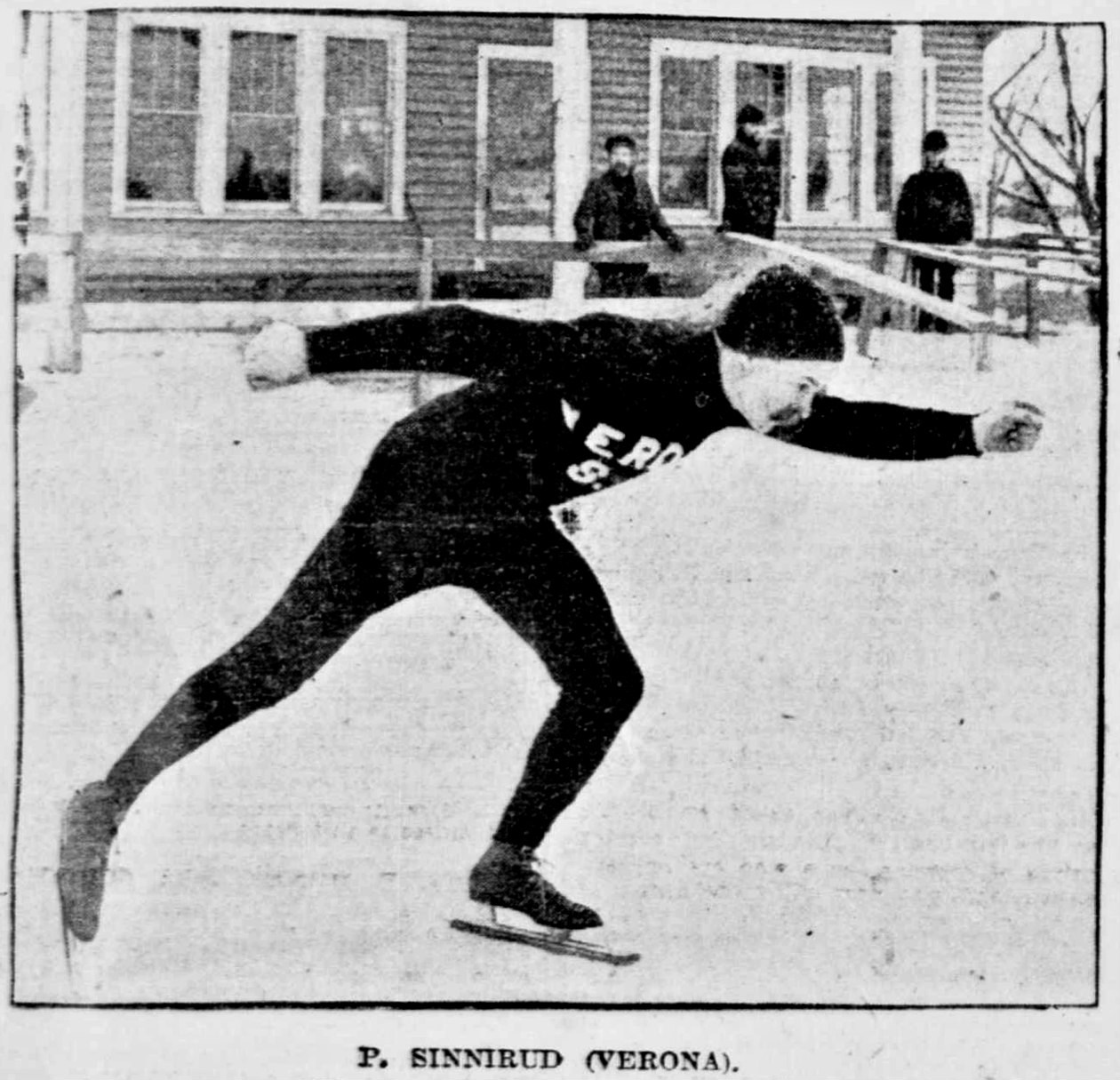
Norwegian speed skater Peter Sinnerud racing for the Verona Lake Skating Club where he was a teammate of Morris Wood.

While a member of the Verona Lake Skating Club Wood was a clubmate of the Norwegian speed skater Peter Sinnerud (b. 1876). Sinnerud went by the nickname "The Terrible Swede" in North America due to his speed and the Swedish–Norwegian Union. Wood and Sinnerud trained together at rinks in Manhattan and Brooklyn and during a series of championship races at Verona Lake, New Jersey in 1902 they managed to beat the visiting Canadians in outclassing fashion (Sinnerud winning three races and Wood two), although Sinnerud got disqualified by the referees from his second-place finish (behind Wood) in the one-mile race due to him "shooing" his clubmate in ahead of himself.

Wood turned professional in 1908. His younger brother Oliver "Ollie" Wood also competed as a speed skater for the Verona Lake Skating Club.

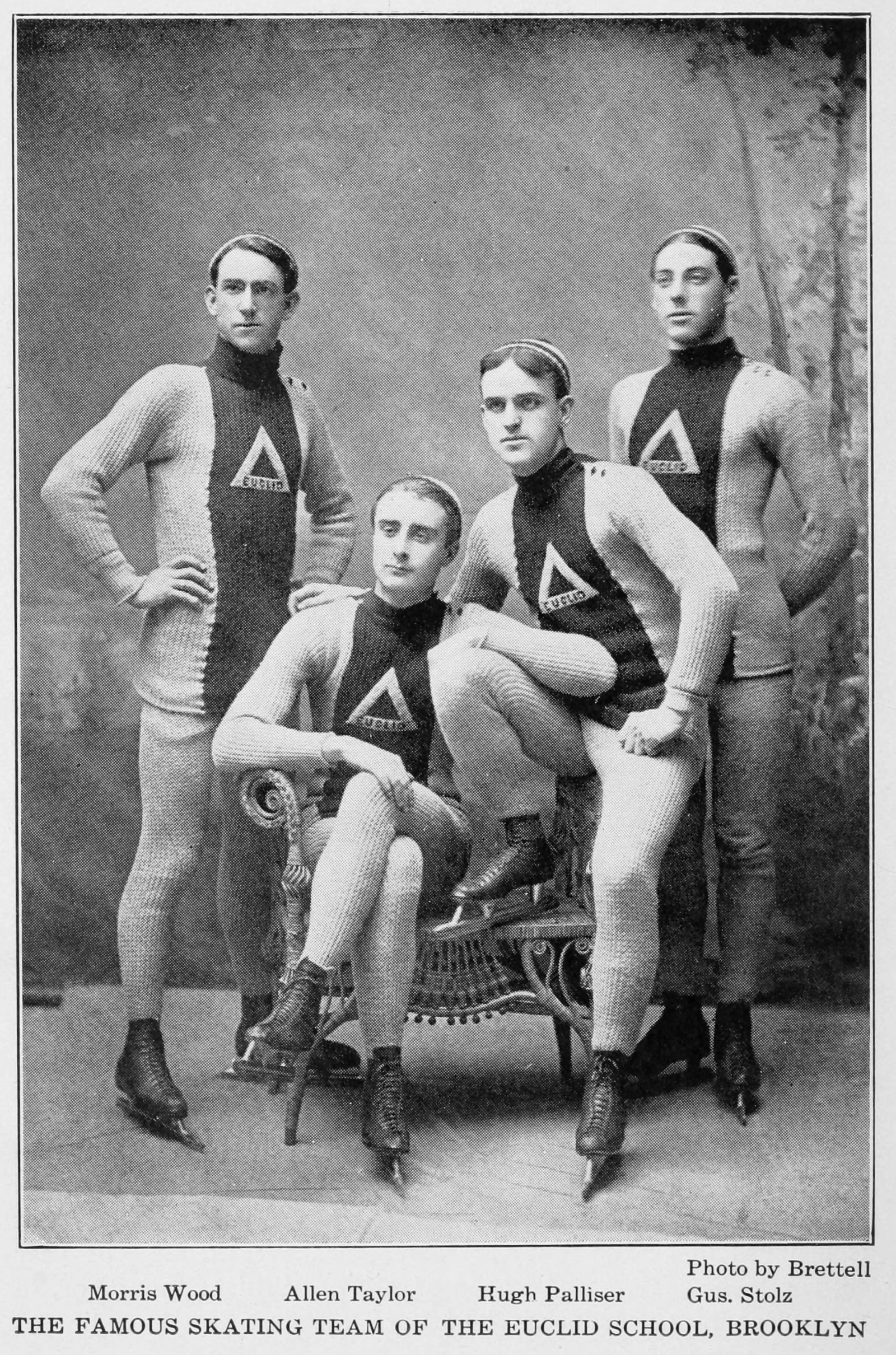
Wood, at left, with the speed skating team of the Euclid School in Brooklyn.
