= Espanola High School (Espanola, Ontario) =

Coordinates: 46.2623°N 81.7704°W

Location
- 147 Spruce Street; Espanola, Ontario, P5E 1R7; Canada

Information
- School type: Provincial, Secondary High School
- Motto: scientia est sapientia (Latin) (knowledge and wisdom (English))
- School board: Rainbow District School Board
- Principal: Andrea Terrian
- Grades: 9–12
- Enrollment: approximately 388 (2019)
- Language: English
- Colours: green and white
- Mascot: Spartan
- Website: www.rainbowschools.ca/school/espanola-high-school/

Espanola High School is located in the town of Espanola, Ontario, approximately 70 km from downtown Greater Sudbury. Espanola High School shares a building with A.B. Ellis Public School, Contact North, and the One Tot Stop Daycare.

The school is overseen by the Rainbow District School Board.

== Notable achievements ==
=== Ringette ===
In the early 1960s, the Espanola Parks and Recreation director, Mirl Arthur "Red" McCarthy, experimented with and developed the first official set of rules for the sport of ringette upon the request of Sam Jacks, the president of the Society of Directors of Municipal Recreation of Ontario (SDMRO), using girls ice hockey players from Espanola High School. The games were played at the Espanola Arena.

=== Jazz ===
Espanola's various jazz bands did very well at the MusicFest Canada 2006 Festival, specifically in the Instrumental Jazz Division Competition.

2006
Espanola High School Intermediate Jazz Combo	Silver
Espanola High School Junior Jazz Band	Bronze
Espanola High School Junior Jazz Combo	Silver
Espanola High School Senior Jazz Ensemble	Bronze
Espanola High School Senior Jazz Combo	Silver

== See also ==
- Education in Ontario
- List of secondary schools in Ontario
