= Blocker (ice hockey) =

Glove used by a hockey goaltender

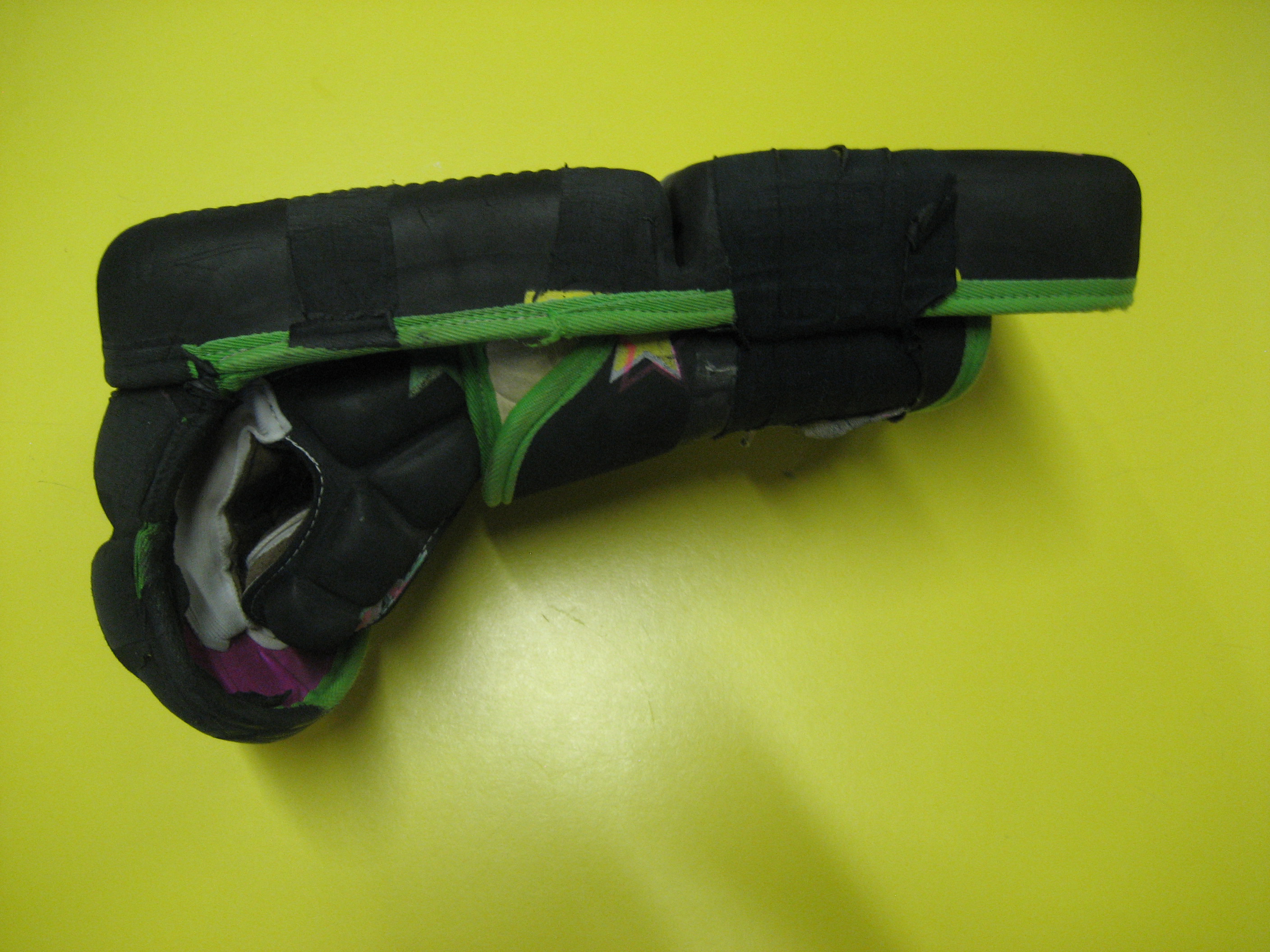
A blocker designed for roller hockey

The goalie blocker is a rectangular piece of equipment worn by goaltenders in the sports of ice hockey, roller hockey, rink hockey, broomball, and ringette. It is generally worn on the dominant hand. This article deals chiefly with blockers worn by goalies who play winter sports.

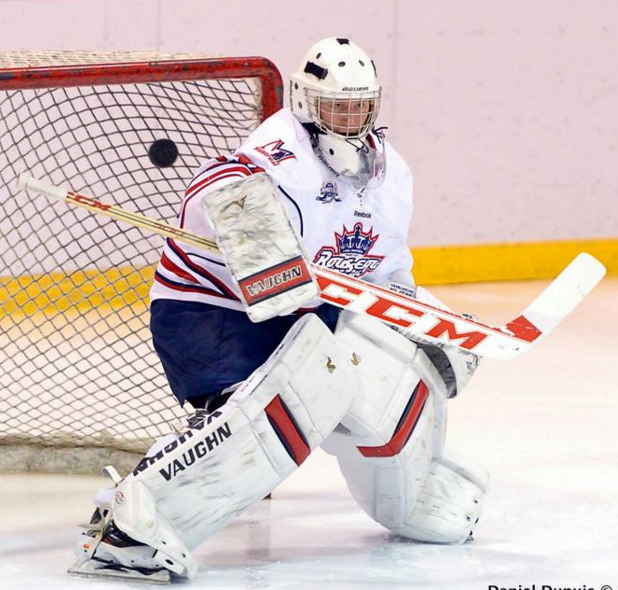
A goaltender turns a puck away with his blocker

The blocker is a close-fitting glove augmented on the back of the hand, wrist and part of the forearm by a rectangular "block" of padding and fabric (leather or synthetic). Goaltenders hold their stick in that hand and use the padded rectangle to block shots -- bouncing them away from the net, as opposed to holding them in the catching glove. Experienced goalies can "steer" the shot by angling the blocker as the puck strikes. The padding also serves to protect the hand and lower forearm of the goaltender.

== Notes ==
- ^1 A blocker may also be referred to as a 'waffle' or 'waffle-board' stemming from the visual appearance of the blocker in pre-modern ice hockey equipment era.
- ^2 Typically a right-handed goaltender would wear the blocker glove on their dominant right hand; a left-handed goaltender mirrors this on his left side. Blockers are typically manufactured for right-handed players ("standard setup"). To avoid confusion, a left-handed player's equipment setup may sometimes be referred to as "full-right" setup.

== See also ==
- Trapper
