= Trapper (ice hockey) =

Piece of Hockey Equipment

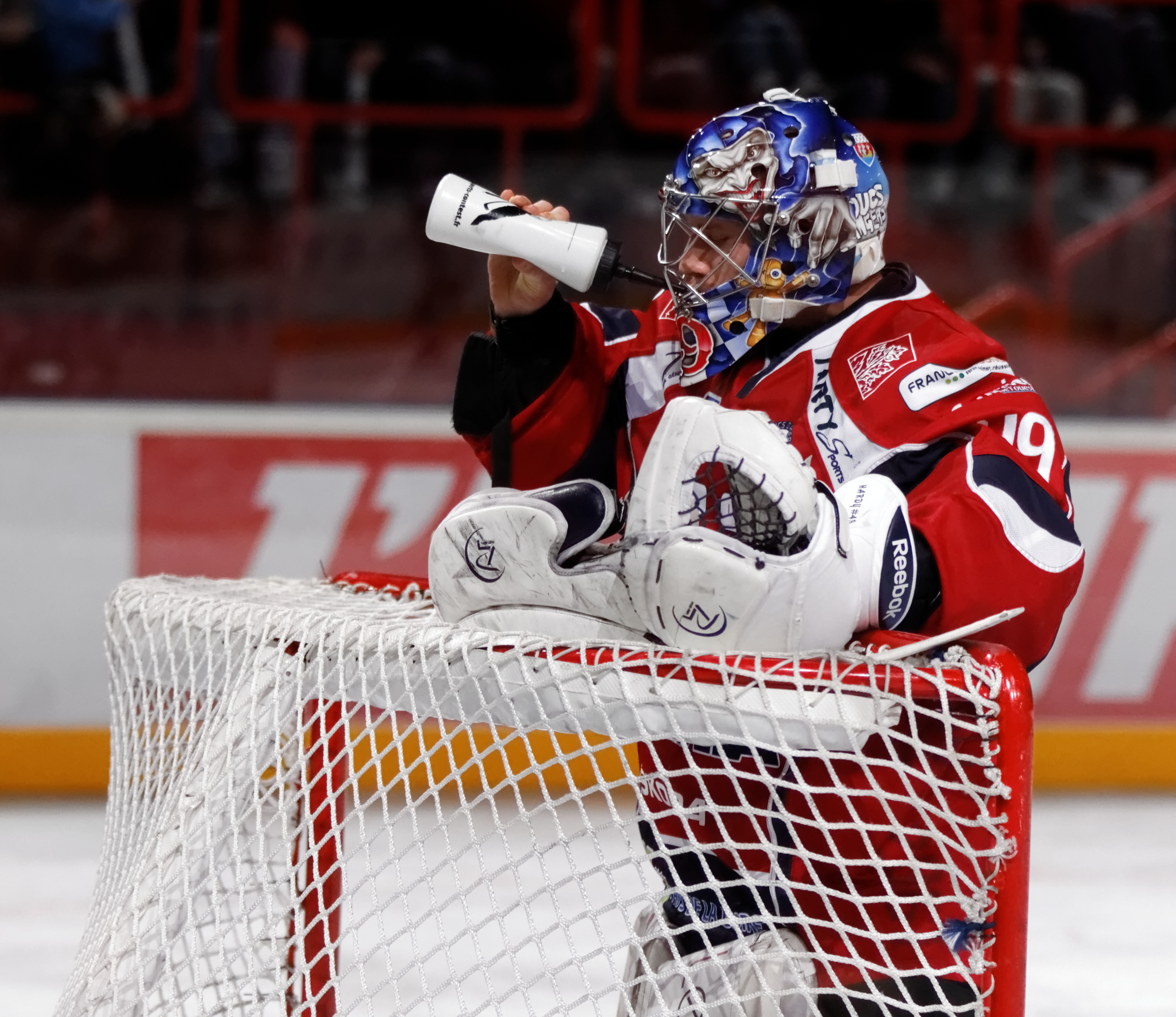
A trapper

A trapper, also referred to as catch glove or simply glove, is a piece of equipment that an ice hockey goaltender wears on the non-dominant hand to assist in catching and stopping the puck.

== Evolution ==
The trapper originally had the same shape as a baseball glove, but evolved into a highly specific piece of equipment that is designed specifically for catching the puck. Changes made over time include the addition of a "string mesh" in the pocket of the trapper and substantially more palm and wrist protection. The "cheater" portion of the glove covers the wrist, which evolved from gauntlet-like gloves from the 1920s.

The trapper was introduced by goaltender Emile Francis while playing for the Chicago Black Hawks during the 1946-47 season.

== Technique ==
The pocket is the area of the trapper between the thumb and first finger of the glove, and is where most goaltenders try to catch the puck, as it reduces the discomfort the goaltender experiences and minimizes the chance of the puck falling out of the glove, creating the possibility of a rebound.

=== Positioning ===
Worn on the non-dominant hand, the trapper can be held in a variety of positions depending upon individual style and preference. Younger goaltenders tend to hold the glove with the palm facing towards the shooter, instead of in the traditional "shake hands" position.

== See also ==
- Blocker
