= 2018–19 NOJHL season =

41st season of the NOJHL

- League: Northern Ontario Junior Hockey League
- Sport: Ice hockey
- Duration: September–March
- Games: 336
- Teams: 12
- Finals champions: Hearst Lumberjacks

NOJHL seasons
- ← 2017–18 2019–20 →

The 2018–19 NOJHL season was the 41st season of the Northern Ontario Junior Hockey League (NOJHL). The Hearst Lumberjacks won the league championship Copeland Cup – McNamara Trophy after defeating the first-place Soo Thunderbirds in game 7 of the final.

The league instituted a new overtime format. In case of a tie at the end of regulation time, the two sides would play a five-minute 3-on-3 overtime period. If still tied, the winner would be determined by a shootout.

The Cochrane Crunch and the Town of Cochrane, Ontario hosted the 2019 Dudley Hewitt Cup regional championship tournament.

Timmins Rock goalie, Tyler Masternak, set a league record with 6 shutouts in a single season. He subsequently broke his own record with 8 shutouts during the 2019–20 NOJHL season. Masternak recorded a total of 18 shutouts during his NOJHL career, more than any goalie in league history.

== Regular season ==
The regular season ran from 7 September 2018 to 7 March 2019 with each team playing 56 games, including 4 or 5 games against the teams in their division, and 2 games against teams in the other division.

East division
Team	GP	W	L	OTL	SOL	GF	GA	Pts
Hearst Lumberjacks	56	33	16	6	1	210	159	73
Kirkland Lake Gold Miners	56	33	17	3	3	194	156	72
Powassan Voodoos	56	33	19	3	1	206	172	70
Timmins Rock	56	33	20	3	0	186	156	69
Cochrane Crunch	56	31	20	1	4	200	186	67
French River Rapids	56	14	39	2	1	155	244	31

Source: "2018–19 NOJHL standings". hockeydb.com.

West division
Team	GP	W	L	OTL	SOL	GF	GA	Pts
Soo Thunderbirds	56	44	11	0	1	221	145	89
Rayside Balfour Canadians	56	31	20	2	3	194	169	67
Soo Eagles	56	28	24	3	1	208	185	60
Blind River Beavers	56	25	24	5	2	201	185	57
Elliot Lake Wildcats	56	21	32	1	2	152	224	45
Espanola Express	56	10	43	0	3	145	291	23

Source: "2018–19 NOJHL standings". hockeydb.com.

== Post-season ==
2019 League championship
Copeland Cup – McNamara Trophy

Tournament details
- Dates: 8 March – 24 April 2019
- Teams: 10
- Defending champions: Cochrane Crunch

Final positions
- Champions: Hearst Lumberjacks
- Runners-up: Soo Thunderbirds
- Semifinalists: Powassan Voodoos; Rayside Balfour Canadians

Tournament statistics
- Games played: 46
- Goals scored: 278 (6.04 per game)
- Attendance: 25,104 (546 per game)

The first, second and third place teams in each division advanced to the quarterfinals. The fourth and fifth place teams in each division played off in a best-of-three series, with the winner advancing to the quarterfinals.

First round
Timmins Rock	2
Cochrane Crunch	0
Blind River Beavers	2
Elliot Lake Wildcats	0

Quarterfinals
Hearst Lumberjacks	4
Timmins Rock	3
Powassan Voodoos	4
Kirland Lake	2
Soo Thunderbirds	4
Blind River Beavers	2
Rayside Balfour	4
Soo Eagles	2

Semifinals
Hearst Lumberjacks	4
Powassan Voodoos	0
Soo Thunderbirds	4
Rayside Balfour	2

Finals
Hearst Lumberjacks	4
Soo Thunderbirds	3

Source: "2018–19 NOJHL playoff results". hockeydb.com.

== Regional championship ==
2019 Central Region Championship
Dudley Hewitt Cup

Tournament details
- City: Cochrane, Ontario
- Dates: 30 April - 4 May 2019
- Teams: 4
- Host team: Cochrane Crunch

Final positions
- Champions: Oakville Blades
- Runners-up: Hearst Lumberjacks

Tournament statistics
- Games played: 8
- Goals scored: 52 (6.5 per game)

The 2019 Dudley Hewitt Cup Central Canada regional championship tournament took place in Cochrane, Ontario. The field of competition included the championship Hearst Lumberjacks of the NOJHL; the Oakville Blades of the OJHL; the Thunder Bay North Stars of the SIJHL; and host team the Cochrane Crunch of the NOJHL. The format consisted of a preliminary round-robin, followed by the single-elimination semifinal and final rounds. The Thunder Bay North Stars were the first team eliminated after losing three straight games in the round-robin. The Hearst Lumberjacks and the Cochrane Crunch met in the semifinals, with the Lumberjacks winning by a score of 6-0. The Lumberjacks were defeated in the final by the Oakville Blades by a score of 2-0. The Blades went on to the 2019 National Junior A Championship tournament in Brooks, Alberta and made it into the semifinals before they were eliminated by the Prince George Spruce Kings of the BCHL.

=== Preliminary round ===
	Round robin	OB	CC	HL	TN
1	Oakville Blades		6-2	4-2	9-4
2	Cochrane Crunch	2-6		5-4	4-1
3	Hearst Lumberjacks	2-4	4-5		3-0
4	Thunder Bay North Stars	4-9	1-4	0-3	

=== Playoffs ===
Semifinal		Final
		Oakville	2
Cochrane	0	Hearst	0
Hearst	6

== Sources ==
- "2025 Centennial Cup Guide & Record Book" (PDF). hockeycanada.ca.
- "2019 Road to NJAC" (PDF). hockeycanada.ca.
- Sleightholm, Brent (18 February 2019). "Report recommends City of Elliot Lake purchase Wildcats NOJHL team". ElliotLakeToday.com. Village Media.
- "Northern Ontario Junior Hockey League to implement concussion management software". TimminsToday.com. Village Media. 30 October 2018.
- Leeson, Ben (11 May 2018). "Frappier new Rapids bench boss". Sudbury Star. Postmedia.
- Pascal, Randy (11 October 2018). "That Sudbury Sports Guy: Stories from the NOJHL Showcase". Sudbury Star. Postmedia.
- Leeson, Ben (4 March 2019). "Stats man hangs it up: Dave Harrison retires after decades of crunching numbers for Sudbury Wolves, NOJHL". Sudbury Star. Postmedia.
- Campbell, Ken (7 January 2019). "There was another bus accident involving a Jr. A hockey team this weekend. Thankfully, this one didn't end in tragedy". The Hockey News. Roustan Media.
- Sleightholm, Brent (18 February 2019). "Report recommends City of Elliot Lake purchase Wildcats NOJHL team". ElliotLakeToday.com. Village Media.
- Sleightholm, Brent (27 November 2018). "Wildcats come up empty-handed regarding city loan repayment". ElliotLakeToday.com. Village Media.
- "Support being offered for NOJHL players after bus crash". CBC News. CBC/Radio-Canada. 7 January 2019.
- "CJHL to implement reduction of 20-year-olds, commencing with upcoming 2018-19 season". cjhlhockey.com (Press release). 31 August 2018.
- Dempsey, Keith (22 August 2018). "Levack's Cuomo returns home to coach Canadians". Sudbury Star. Postmedia.
- Leeson, Ben (4 March 2019). "Stats man hangs it up: Dave Harrison retires after decades of crunching numbers for Sudbury Wolves, NOJHL". Sudbury Star. Postmedia.
- Leeson, Ben (11 May 2018). "Frappier new Rapids bench boss". Sudbury Star. Postmedia.
