= 2017–18 NOJHL season =

40th season of the NOJHL

- League: Northern Ontario Junior Hockey League
- Sport: Ice hockey
- Duration: September–March
- Games: 336
- Teams: 12
- Total attendance: 138,585
- Finals champions: Cochrane Crunch

NOJHL seasons
- ← 2016–17 2018–19 →

The 2017–18 NOJHL season was the 40th season of the Northern Ontario Junior Hockey League (NOJHL).

Matthew Neault of the Rayside Balfour Canadians set a league record for the most regular season games played with 268 over the course of his NOJHL career, which spanned from 2013–2018. The previous record of 243 was set by Chris Pontes of the Sudbury Jr. Wolves in 2009–10.

Giordano Finoro of the Rayside Balfour Canadians became the 3rd player in league history to score 3 shorthanded goals in a single game. The other players to do so were Rob Demers of the Elliot Lake Vikings and Denis Castonguay of the Rayside Balfour Canadians in the 1983–84 season.

The franchise formerly known as the Iroquois Falls Eskis relocated to the Town of Hearst, Ontario and were rebranded as the Hearst Lumberjacks.

== Regular season ==
Each team played 56 season games, including 4 or 5 games against the teams in their division, and 2 games against teams in the other division. The top 5 teams in each division advanced to the playoffs.

East division
Team	GP	W	L	OTW	OTL	GF	GA	Pts
Powassan Voodoos	56	45	7	4	1	299	171	94
Cochrane Crunch	56	36	17	3	2	233	165	75
Kirkland Lake Gold Miners	56	24	21	2	7	163	180	59
Hearst Lumberjacks	56	23	30	1	2	215	226	49
Timmins Rock	56	19	31	4	3	142	184	44
French River Rapids	56	13	38	2	5	164	287	31

Source: "2017–18 NOJHL standings". hockeydb.com.

West division
Team	GP	W	L	OTW	OTL	GF	GA	Pts
Rayside Balfour Canadians	56	37	14	2	4	222	139	79
Soo Thunderbirds	56	36	16	0	3	195	134	76
Soo Eagles	56	35	20	8	0	222	147	71
Blind River Beavers	56	33	19	4	4	195	155	70
Elliot Lake Wildcats	56	25	27	6	4	172	204	54
Espanola Express	56	2	52	0	1	114	344	6

Source: "2017–18 NOJHL standings". hockeydb.com.

== Post-season ==
2018 League championship
Copeland Cup – McNamara Trophy

Tournament details
- Dates: 9 March – 24 April 2018
- Teams: 10
- Defending champions: Powassan Voodoos

Final positions
- Champions: Cochrane Crunch
- Runners-up: Rayside-Balfour Canadians
- Semifinalists: Timmins Rock; Soo Thunderbirds

Tournament statistics
- Games played: 46
- Goals scored: 239 (5.2 per game)
- Attendance: 25,665 (558 per game)

Awards
- Playoff MVP: Connor Lovie

The first, second and third place teams from each division after the regular season advanced to the quarterfinals, while the fourth and fifth place teams from each division played against each other in a best-of-three series. The winners from each best-of-three series advanced to the quarterfinals to play the first place team from their division.

First round
Hearst Lumberjacks	1
Timmins Rock	2
Blind River Beavers	2
Elliot Lake Wildcats	0

Quarterfinals
Powassan Voodoos	2
Timmins Rock	4
Cochrane Crunch	4
Kirkland Lake	1
Rayside-Balfour	4
Blind River Beavers	2
Soo Eagles	3
Soo Thunderbirds	4

Semifinals
Timmins Rock	1
Cochrane Crunch	4
Soo Thunderbirds	2
Rayside-Balfour	4

Finals
Cochrane Crunch	4
Rayside-Balfour	2

Source: "2017–18 NOJHL playoff results". hockeydb.com.

== Regional championship ==
The 2018 Dudley Hewitt Cup regional championship tournament took place in Dryden, Ontario. The field of competition included the OJHL championship Wellington Dukes; the NOJHL championship Cochrane Crunch; the SIJHL runners-up, the Thunder Bay North Stars; and the hosts and SIJHL championship Dryden Ice Dogs. The format consisted of a preliminary round-robin, followed by the single-elimination semifinal and final rounds. The Cochrane Crunch were the first team to be eliminated from competition after losing three straight games in the preliminary round. In the final round, the Wellington Dukes defeated the Dryden Ice Dogs by a score of 7-4 to win the tournament. The Dukes advanced to the 2018 Royal Bank Cup national championship tournament in Chilliwack, where they lost to the Chilliwack Chiefs of the British Columbia Hockey League by a score of 4-2 in the final round.

== Individual awards ==
Most valuable player
Connor Lovie, Cochrane Crunch
Top defenceman
Connor Lovie, Cochrane Crunch
Rookie of the year
Harrison Israels, Powassan Voodoos
Most improved player
Jacob Kelly, Powassan Voodoos
Top defensive forward
Matthew Neault, Rayside Balfour Canadians
Best goals against average
Carter McPhail, Soo Eagles
Team goaltending
Brandon Gordon & Eric Schuch, Soo Thunderbirds
League scoring champion
Kyle Herbster, Cochrane Crunch
Most gentlemanly player
Shane Beaulieu, Powassan Voodoos
Best overall team player
Nick Techel, Soo Eagles
Scholastic player of the year
Evan Krassey, Rayside Balfour Canadians
Coach of the year
John Parco, Soo Thunderbirds
Executive of the year
Darren Smyl, Soo Thunderbirds

== Sources ==
- "2017–18 NOJHL standings". hockeydb.com.
- "2017–18 NOJHL playoff results". hockeydb.com.
- "NOJHL announces transfer of Iroquois Falls franchise to Hearst for 2017–18 season". nojhl.com (Press release). 8 April 2017.
- "2017–18 NOJHL attendance". nojhl.com.
- "NOJHL announces 2017–18 award recipients". sooeagles.net (Press release). 8 March 2018.
- "2025 Centennial Cup Guide & Record Book" (PDF). hockeycanada.ca.
- Autio, Andrew (7 June 2016). "Owed funds from hockey club rocks council meeting". TimminsToday.com. Village Media.
- Giorno, Frank (11 January 2017). "Crown, court say charges against former City Councillor Todd Lever won't be withdrawn". TimminsToday.com. Village Media.
- Autio, Andrew (6 September 2017). "There's a new Beer in town". TimminsToday.com. Village Media.
- "Another Yachmenev hopes to make some more local hockey memories". BayToday.ca. Village Media. 8 September 2017.
- Svoboda, Paul (26 May 2017). "Rock release Woodward". The Belleville Intelligencer. Postmedia.
- "CO2 alarms within Joe Mavrinac Community Complex causes postponement of Kirkland Lake – Timmins contest". nojhl.com. 6 January 2018.
- "Voodoos coach joins Battalion". BayToday.ca. Village Media. 12 June 2017.
- Birnie, Nick (25 April 2018). "Cochrane Crunch Crowned NOJHL Champions". My Kap-Hearst Now.
- "Head coach for top NOJHL team fired". CTV News Northern Ontario. Bell Media. 30 January 2018.
- "Wolves hire former Greyhounds star, T-Birds coach". CTV News Northern Ontario. Bell Media. 5 July 2017.
- Leeson, Ben (3 April 2018). "Canadians must move past 'distractions' - coach". Sudbury Star. Postmedia.
- Leeson, Ben (25 April 2018). "'It was just a great year'". Sudbury Star. Postmedia.
