= 2016–17 NOJHL season =

39th season of the NOJHL

- League: NOJHL
- Sport: Junior ice hockey
- Duration: Regular season 9 September – 8 March; Playoffs; 10 March – 21 April
- Games: 336
- Teams: 12
- Total attendance: 102,814

League championship
- Champions: Powassan Voodoos

NOJHL seasons
- ← 2015–16 2017–18 →

The 2016–17 NOJHL season was the 39th season of the Northern Ontario Junior Hockey League (NOJHL). The Powassan Voodoos finished the regular season in first place and went on to win the league championship Copeland Cup – McNamara Trophy.

The inaugural 2016 NOJHL showcase tournament took place over two days in October at the Gerry McCrory Countryside Sports Complex in Greater Sudbury. Each team in the league played two regular season games.

Yianni Liarakos of the Blind River Beavers became the 3rd player in league history to score 11 game-winning goals in a single season. The other players to do so were Andrew Bain of the Timmins Golden Bears in the 1994–95 season, and Todd Crane of the Rayside Balfour Canadians in the 1998–99 season.

== Regular season ==
Each team played 56 season games, including 4 or 5 games against the teams in their division, and 2 games against teams in the other division. The top 5 teams in each division advanced to the playoffs.

East division
| Team | GP | W | L | OTW | OTL | GF | GA | Pts |
|---|---|---|---|---|---|---|---|---|
| Powassan Voodoos | 56 | 46 | 7 | 6 | 2 | 271 | 121 | 95 |
| Cochrane Crunch | 56 | 38 | 13 | 5 | 4 | 257 | 175 | 81 |
| Timmins Rock | 56 | 36 | 16 | 7 | 3 | 271 | 202 | 76 |
| Kirkland Lake Gold Miners | 56 | 28 | 21 | 3 | 4 | 232 | 190 | 63 |
| Iroquois Falls Eskis | 56 | 16 | 36 | 1 | 4 | 203 | 282 | 36 |
| French River Rapids | 56 | 3 | 51 | 0 | 1 | 128 | 376 | 8 |

Source: "2016–17 NOJHL standings". hockeydb.com.

West division
| Team | GP | W | L | OTW | OTL | GF | GA | Pts |
|---|---|---|---|---|---|---|---|---|
| Soo Thunderbirds | 56 | 43 | 11 | 2 | 1 | 232 | 134 | 88 |
| Blind River Beavers | 56 | 32 | 20 | 2 | 4 | 214 | 162 | 68 |
| Rayside Balfour Canadians | 56 | 28 | 24 | 2 | 3 | 191 | 200 | 60 |
| Soo Eagles | 56 | 27 | 26 | 2 | 2 | 222 | 204 | 57 |
| Elliot Lake Wildcats | 56 | 23 | 26 | 2 | 4 | 157 | 174 | 53 |
| Espanola Express | 56 | 9 | 45 | 1 | 1 | 139 | 297 | 20 |

Source: "2016–17 NOJHL standings". hockeydb.com.

== Post-season ==
2017 League championship
Copeland Cup – McNamara Trophy

Tournament details
- Dates: 10 March–21 April 2017
- Teams: 10
- Defending champions: Soo Thunderbirds

Final positions
- Champions: Powassan Voodoos (1st title)
- Runners-up: Blind River Beavers
- Semifinalists: Timmins Rock; Soo Eagles

Tournament statistics
- Games played: 40
- Goals scored: 260 (6.5 per game)
- Attendance: 22,319 (558 per game)

Awards
- Playoff MVP: Parker Bowman

The first, second and third place teams from each division after the regular season advanced to the quarterfinals, while the fourth and fifth place teams from each division advanced to the first-round best-of-three series of the playoffs. The winners from each best-of-three series advanced to the quarterfinals to play the first place team from their division.

After placing 1st in the regular season, the Powassan Voodoos went undefeated in the post-season to win the league championship Copeland Cup – McNamara Trophy in 12 games. It was the first championship in the team's 3-year history.

First round
Kirkland Lake | 2
Iroquois Falls Eskis | 1
Soo Eagles | 2
Elliot Lake Wildcats | 1

Quarterfinals
Powassan Voodoos | 4
Kirkland Lake | 0
Timmins Rock | 4
Cochrane Crunch | 2
Soo Eagles | 4
Soo Thunderbirds | 0
Blind River Beavers | 4
Rayside-Balfour | 3

Semifinals
Powassan Voodoos | 4
Timmins Rock | 0
Soo Eagles | 1
Blind River Beavers | 4

Finals
Powassan Voodoos | 4
Blind River Beavers | 0

Source: "2016–17 NOJHL playoff results". hockeydb.com.

== Regional championship ==
2017 Central Region Championship
Dudley Hewitt Cup

Tournament details
- City: Trenton, Ontario
- Teams: 4
- Host team: Trenton Golden Hawks
- Defending champions: Trenton Golden Hawks

Final positions
- Champions: Trenton Golden Hawks (2nd title)
- Runners-up: Georgetown Raiders
- Third place: Powassan Voodoos
- Fourth place: Dryden Ice Dogs

Tournament statistics
- Games played: 8
- Goals scored: 50 (6.25 per game)

The 2017 Dudley Hewitt Cup Central Canada regional championship took place in Trenton, Ontario. The competition included the Powassan Voodoos of the NOJHL, the Dryden Ice Dogs of the SIJHL, the Georgetown Raiders of the OJHL, and the host team, the Trenton Golden Hawks of the OJHL. The format consisted of a preliminary round-robin, followed by a single-elimination semifinal and final. After losing 2 out of 3 games in the preliminary round, the Powassan Voodoos lost to the Georgetown Raiders in the semifinal by a score of 2–1, and thus were eliminated from competition. The Trenton Golden Hawks then defeated the Raiders in the final match by a score of 2–1 to win the tournament and advance to the 2017 Royal Bank Cup national championship tournament in Cobourg.

=== Preliminary round ===
| | Round robin | TGH | GR | PV | DID |
| 1 | Trenton Golden Hawks | | 0-1 | 5-1 | 10-4 |
| 2 | Georgetown Raiders | 1-0 | | 5-2 | 4-5 |
| 3 | Powassan Voodoos | 1-5 | 2-5 | | 4-3 |
| 4 | Dryden Ice Dogs | 4-10 | 5-4 | 3-4 | |

=== Playoffs ===
| Semifinal | | | Final |
| | | | 1 | Trenton Goldenn Hawks | 2 |
| 2 | Georgetown Raiders | 2 | 2 | Georgetown Raiders | 1 |
| 3 | Powassan Voodoos | 1 |

== Individual awards ==
In 2017, the annual award for the league's most gentlemanly player was renamed the David Harrison Trophy in honour of the league's longtime statistician and historian. Harrison retired in 2019 after 47 years with the league.

Most valuable player of the regular season
Nate McDonald (Powassan Voodoos)
Best defenceman
Connor Lovie (Cochrane Crunch)
Rookie of the year
Kyle Liinamaa (Rayside Balfour Canadians)
Most improved player
Jake Saxton (Soo Eagles)
Top defensive forward
Parker Bowman (Powassan Voodoos)
Best goals-against-average for a goaltender
Nate McDonald (Powassan Voodoos)
Team goaltending award
Nate McDonald & Andrew Suriano (Powassan Voodoos)
League scoring champion
Braeden Cross (Cochrane Crunch)
Most gentlemanly player
Anthony Bastianello (Blind River Beavers)
Best overall team player
Matt Caruso (Soo Thunderbirds)
Scholastic player of the year
Cayse Ton (Rayside Balfour Canadians)
Coach of the year
Kyle Brick (Blind River Beavers)
Executive of the year
Bruno Bragagnola (Soo Eagles)
RBC scholarship
Brandon Grandinetti (Soo Thunderbirds)

== Sources ==
- "2016–17 NOJHL standings". hockeydb.com.
- "2016–17 NOJHL playoff results". hockeydb.com.
- "2025 Centennial Cup Guide & Record Book" (PDF). hockeycanada.ca.
- "NOJHL individual awards". nojhl.com.
- Autio, Andrew (7 June 2016). "Owed funds from hockey club rocks council meeting". TimminsToday.com. Village Media.
- Hale, Alan S. (20 December 2016). "Former Timmins councillor defends actions". thesudburystar.com. Postmedia.
- Giorno, Frank (11 January 2017). "Crown, court say charges against former City Councillor Todd Lever won't be withdrawn". TimminsToday.com. Village Media.
- Sager, Neate (4 August 2016). "Voodoos goalie Nate McDonald up and close and personal with NHL stars". BayToday.ca. Village Media.
- "Another Yachmenev hopes to make some more local hockey memories". BayToday.ca. Village Media. 8 September 2017.
- Svoboda, Paul (26 May 2017). "Rock release Woodward". The Belleville Intelligencer. Postmedia.
- Armstrong, Kenneth (9 September 2016). "Terrifying hotel-room robbery has happy ending thanks to local cop". SooToday.com. Village Media.
- Sahar Zerehi, Sima (7 September 2016). "Sault Ste. Marie cop takes in stranded Nunavut teen robbed during hockey tryouts". CBC News. CBC/Radio-Canada.
- "Voodoos coach joins Battalion". BayToday.ca. Village Media. 12 June 2017.
- Leeson, Ben (10 March 2017). "Liinamaa a fabulous freshman for Canadians". Sudbury Star. Postmedia.
- "NOJHL unveils schedule". Sudbury Star. Postmedia. 15 July 2016.
