= 2018–19 CCHL season =

58th season of the CCHL

- League: Central Canada Hockey League
- Sport: Ice hockey
- Duration: Regular season September–March
- Games: 62
- Teams: 12
- Total attendance: 119,333

League championship
- Bogart Cup: Ottawa Jr. Senators
- Runners-up: Carleton Place Canadians

Regional championship
- Champions: Ottawa Jr. Senators
- Runners-up: Princeville Titan

CCHL seasons
- ← 2017–18 2019–20 →

The 2018–19 CCHL season was the 58th season of the Central Canada Hockey League (CCHL). Teams played a 62-game regular-season schedule. The Ottawa Jr. Senators won their second consecutive league championship Bogart Cup, before going on to win their second consecutive Eastern Canada championship at the 2019 Fred Page Cup in Amherst, Nova Scotia. The Ottawa Jr. Senators went on to compete for the 2019 Royal Bank Cup at the national championship tournament in Brooks, Alberta and were eliminated in the semifinal round by the Brooks Bandits of the AJHL.

== Season highlights ==
For the second straight year the Ottawa Jr. Senators went to the national championship tournament after securing the CCHL championship Bogart Trophy, and the Eastern Canada regional championship Fred Page Cup. Ottawa goalie, Francis Boisvert, received the award for the Most Valuable Player of the 2019 National Junior A Championship.

=== Awards ===
- Most Valuable Player: Zack Hoffman (Navan Grads)
- Top Rookie: Kyle Jackson (Ottawa Jr. Senators)
- Outstanding Defenceman: Zack Hoffman (Navan Grads)
- Sportsmanship/ability award: John Beaton (Kemptville 73's)
- Top Prospect: Simon Mack (Brockville Braves)
- Outstanding graduating player: Eric Faith (Brockville Braves)
- Arthur K. Nielsen scholarship award: Connor Matton (Rockland Nationals)
- Scoring champion: Luca Nocita (Kanata Lasers)
- Top Goaltender: Liam Souliere (Brockville Braves)
- Top Coach: Jesse Winchester (Brockville Braves)
- Top General Manager: Dustin Traylen (Brockville Braves)

Source: "Season award archives". thecchl.ca.

== Regular season ==
Teams played 62 regular season games, including 6 games against teams in the same division, 6 games against two of the teams in the other division, and 5 games against the remaining 4 teams from the other division. The top 8 teams overall advanced to the post-season.

Robinson division
Team	Centre	GP	W	L	OTL	SOL	GF	GA	Pts
Carleton Place Canadians	Carleton Place, Ontario	62	44	11	3	4	236	140	95
Brockville Braves	Brockville, Ontario	62	41	16	3	2	202	149	87
Smiths Falls Bears	Smiths Falls, Ontario	62	28	23	9	2	195	211	67
Kanata Lasers	Kanata, Ontario	62	30	27	3	2	218	206	65
Pembroke Lumber Kings	Pembroke, Ontario	62	27	34	1	0	188	232	55
Kemptville 73's	Kemptville, Ontario	62	21	34	5	2	176	227	49

Source: "2018–19 Central CCHL standings". hockeydb.com.

Yzerman division
Team	Centre	GP	W	L	OTL	SOL	GF	GA	Pts
Ottawa Jr. Senators	Ottawa, Ontario	62	43	16	0	3	234	154	89
Rockland Nationals	Rockland, Ontario	62	40	17	3	2	205	151	85
Hawkesbury Hawks	Hawkesbury, Ontario	62	37	19	4	2	190	169	80
Navan Grads	Navan, Ontario	62	25	28	6	3	168	191	59
Cornwall Colts	Cornwall, Ontario	62	24	29	7	2	160	193	57
Nepean Raiders	Nepean, Ontario	62	12	47	3	0	123	272	27

Source: "2018–19 Central CCHL standings". hockeydb.com.

== Post-season ==
2019 League championship
Bogart Cup

Tournament details
- Dates: March – April
- Teams: 8
- Defending champions: Ottawa Jr. Senators

Final positions
- Champions: Ottawa Jr. Senators
- Runners-up: Carleton Place Canadians

Tournament statistics
- Games played: 33
- Goals scored: 187 (5.67 per game)
- Attendance: 15,883 (481 per game)

Awards
- Playoff MVP: Francis Boisvert

The top 8 teams after the regular season advanced to the playoffs. In the final round, the 2nd place Ottawa Jr. Senators defeated the 1st place Carleton Place Canadians in 5 games.

Quarter-finals
Carleton Place	4
Navan	0
Rockland	4
Hawkesbury	1
Brockville	4
Smiths Falls	1
Ottawa	4
Kanata	1

Semi-finals
Carleton Place	4
Rockland	1
Brockville	0
Ottawa	4

Bogart Cup Finals
Carleton Place	1
Ottawa	4

Source: "2018–19 CCHL playoff results". hockeydb.com.

== Eastern Canada championship ==
2019 Eastern Canada championship
Fred Page Cup

Tournament details
- Teams: 4
- Defending champions: Ottawa Jr. Senators

Final positions
- Champions: Ottawa Jr. Senators
- Runners-up: Princeville Titans
- Third place: Amherst Ramblers
- Fourth place: Yarmouth Mariners

Tournament statistics
- Games played: 8
- Goals scored: 52 (6.5 per game)

Official website
- Hockey Canada

The Ottawa Jr. Senators won their second consecutive Eastern Canada regional championship at the 2019 Fred Page Cup tournament in Amherst, Nova Scotia. The competition included the hosting Amherst Ramblers of the MHL, the MHL championship Yarmouth Mariners, and the QJHL championship Princeville Titan.

Based on the results of the round-robin, in which each team played a single match against each other team, the Yarmouth Mariners were eliminated from competition; the Ottawa Jr. Senators and Amherst Ramblers advanced to the semifinal; and the top-seeded Princeville Titan advanced to the final.

	Round-robin	PT	OJS	AR	YM
1	Princeville Titan		4-3	5-0	3-2
2	Ottawa Jr. Senators	3-4		4-1	5-2
3	Amherst Ramblers	0-5	1-4		5-3
4	Yarmouth Mariners	2-3	2-5	3-5	

The Ottawa Jr. Senators defeated the Amherst Ramblers in the semifinal match after scoring the game-winning goal in the last second of regulation time. In the final match, the Ottawa Jr. Senators defeated the Princeville Titan by a score of 9–2.

Semifinals		Finals
Ottawa	4
Amherst	3
Amherst	3	Ottawa	9
		Princeville	2

== National championship ==
The 2019 National Junior A Championship took place in Brooks, Alberta. The competition included the hosting Brooks Bandits, the Prince George Spruce Kings of the BCHL, the Portage Terriers of the MJHL, the Oakville Blades of the OJHL, and the Ottawa Jr. Senators. The Brooks Bandits won the competition after defeating the Ottawa Jr. Senators in the semifinal match, and the Prince George Spruce Kings in the final. Ottawa goalie, Francis Boisvert, received the award for the Most Valuable Player of the 2019 National Junior A Championship.

== Sources ==
- "2018–19 CCHL standings". hockeydb.com.
- Svoboda, Paul (8 May 2018). "The ABC's of the RBC: National Jr. A hockey field finalized as Steinbach captures ANAVET Cup". Bellevue Intelligencer. Postmedia.
- "2019 RBC Cup | National Junior A Hockey Championship". hockeycanada.ca.
- "CCHL announces divisional realignment". thecchl.ca. 30 July 2017.
- Cole, Darrell (12 October 2017). "Ramblers awarded 2019 Fred Page Cup". saltwire.com. Postmedia.
- "Road to the NJAC" (PDF). hockeycanada.ca.
- "National Junior A Championship Team Preview: Ottawa Jr. A Senators (CCHL)". cjhlhockey.com. 10 May 2019.
- Cole, Darrell (25 April 2019). "Yarmouth enters Fred Page Cup on a roll". saltwire.com. Postmedia.
- "Bogart Cup Recap | Jr Senators crowned Bogart Cup champs for second straight season". thecchl.ca. 22 April 2019.
