= Jean-Guy Trudel =

Canadian ice hockey player

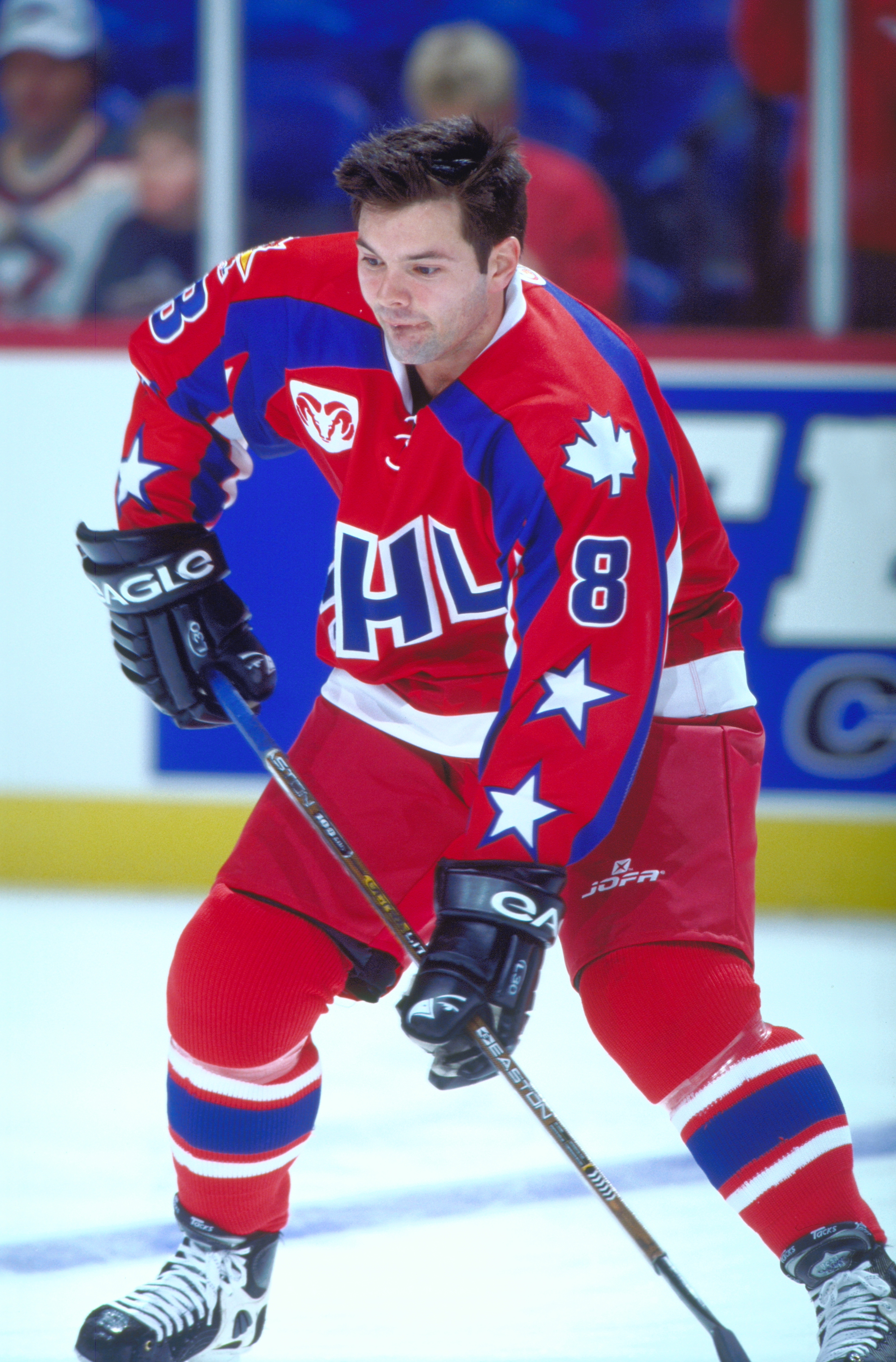
- Born: October 18, 1975 (age 50) Sudbury, Ontario, Canada
- Height: 6 ft 0 in (183 cm)
- Weight: 220 lb (100 kg; 15 st 10 lb)
- Position: Left wing
- Shot: Left
- Played for: Phoenix Coyotes; Minnesota Wild; HC Ambrì-Piotta; ZSC Lions
- NHL draft: Undrafted
- Playing career: 1997–2010

Jean-Guy Andre Trudel (born October 18, 1975) is a Canadian former professional ice hockey left winger. He played five games in the National Hockey League (NHL) with the Phoenix Coyotes and the Minnesota Wild. Trudel is currently the head coach of the Peoria Rivermen in the SPHL. He is also in charge of the Peoria Youth Hockey Association.

== Playing career ==
As a youth, Trudel played in the 1989 Quebec International Pee-Wee Hockey Tournament with a minor ice hockey team from Amos, Quebec.

Trudel played junior ice hockey in the Quebec Major Junior Hockey League, his last two seasons for the Hull Olympiques, helping his team to a Memorial Cup berth in 1995.

Undrafted by any NHL team, Trudel had a lengthy career in the minor leagues, most notably for the Springfield Falcons of the American Hockey League, for which he is the all-time leading career scorer in goals and points, and during which time he was named an AHL Second Team All-Star in the 2000 season. He played his penultimate season in North America with the Houston Aeros of the AHL in 2003, finishing second in league scoring by a single point.

He then went to Europe to play in the Swiss National League A for the rest of his career, save for a single season with the Peoria Rivermen of the AHL in 2008, principally for HC Ambri-Piotta, for whom he finished in the top three in the league in either goals or points his four seasons with the team.

== Coaching career ==
Trudel is currently a part owner and formerly the GM/Head Coach of the Peoria Mustangs in the NA3HL. He left his positions with the Mustangs to become head coach of the newest iteration of the Peoria Rivermen in the Southern Professional Hockey League. While with the Rivermen, he has won the SPHL's Coach of the Year three times.

== Career statistics ==
			Regular season					Playoffs
Season	Team	League	GP	G	A	Pts	PIM	GP	G	A	Pts	PIM
1991–92	Beauport Harfangs	QMJHL	56	1	4	5	20	—	—	—	—	—
1992–93	Beauport Harfangs	QMJHL	35	5	7	12	20	—	—	—	—	—
1992–93	Verdun Collège Français	QMJHL	10	1	0	1	0	2	0	0	0	5
1993–94	Rouyn–Noranda Capitales	NOJHL	37	44	50	94	49	14	18	27	45	29
1994–95	Hull Olympiques	QMJHL	54	29	42	71	76	19	4	13	17	25
1995–96	Hull Olympiques	QMJHL	70	50	71	121	96	17	11	18	29	8
1996–97	Quad City Mallards	CoHL	5	8	7	15	4	—	—	—	—	—
1996–97	Peoria Rivermen	ECHL	37	25	29	54	47	9	9	10	19	22
1996–97	San Antonio Dragons	IHL	12	1	5	6	4	—	—	—	—	—
1996–97	Chicago Wolves	IHL	6	1	2	3	2	—	—	—	—	—
1997–98	Peoria Rivermen	ECHL	62	39	74	113	147	3	0	0	0	2
1998–99	Kansas City Blades	IHL	76	24	25	49	66	3	1	0	1	0
1999–2000	Springfield Falcons	AHL	72	34	39	73	80	3	0	1	1	4
1999–2000	Phoenix Coyotes	NHL	1	0	0	0	0	—	—	—	—	—
2000–01	Springfield Falcons	AHL	80	34	65	99	89	—	—	—	—	—
2001–02	Springfield Falcons	AHL	76	22	48	70	83	—	—	—	—	—
2001–02	Phoenix Coyotes	NHL	3	0	0	0	2	—	—	—	—	—
2002–03	Houston Aeros	AHL	79	31	54	85	85	23	7	9	16	22
2002–03	Minnesota Wild	NHL	1	0	0	0	2	—	—	—	—	—
2003–04	HC Ambrì–Piotta	NLA	47	29	39	68	64	7	4	4	8	14
2004–05	HC Ambrì–Piotta	NLA	42	23	35	58	105	—	—	—	—	—
2005–06	HC Ambrì–Piotta	NLA	44	24	35	59	48	7	4	4	8	12
2006–07	HC Ambrì–Piotta	NLA	44	27	26	53	38	—	—	—	—	—
2007–08	Peoria Rivermen	AHL	78	23	44	67	56	—	—	—	—	—
2008–09	ZSC Lions	NLA	42	16	24	40	41	3	0	1	1	0
2009–10	ZSC Lions	NLA	37	16	21	37	16	—	—	—	—	—
AHL totals			385	144	250	394	393	26	7	10	17	26
NHL totals			5	0	0	0	4	—	—	—	—	—
NLA totals			256	135	180	315	312	17	8	9	17	26

== Awards and honours ==
Award	Year
QMJHL
Second all-star team	1996
ECHL
First All-Star Team	1998
AHL
Second all-star team	2000, 2002
First All-Star Team	2001, 2003
All-Star Game	2001, 2002, 2003
Calder Cup (Houston Aeros)	2003
