= Jacob Melanson =

Canadian ice hockey player (born 2003)

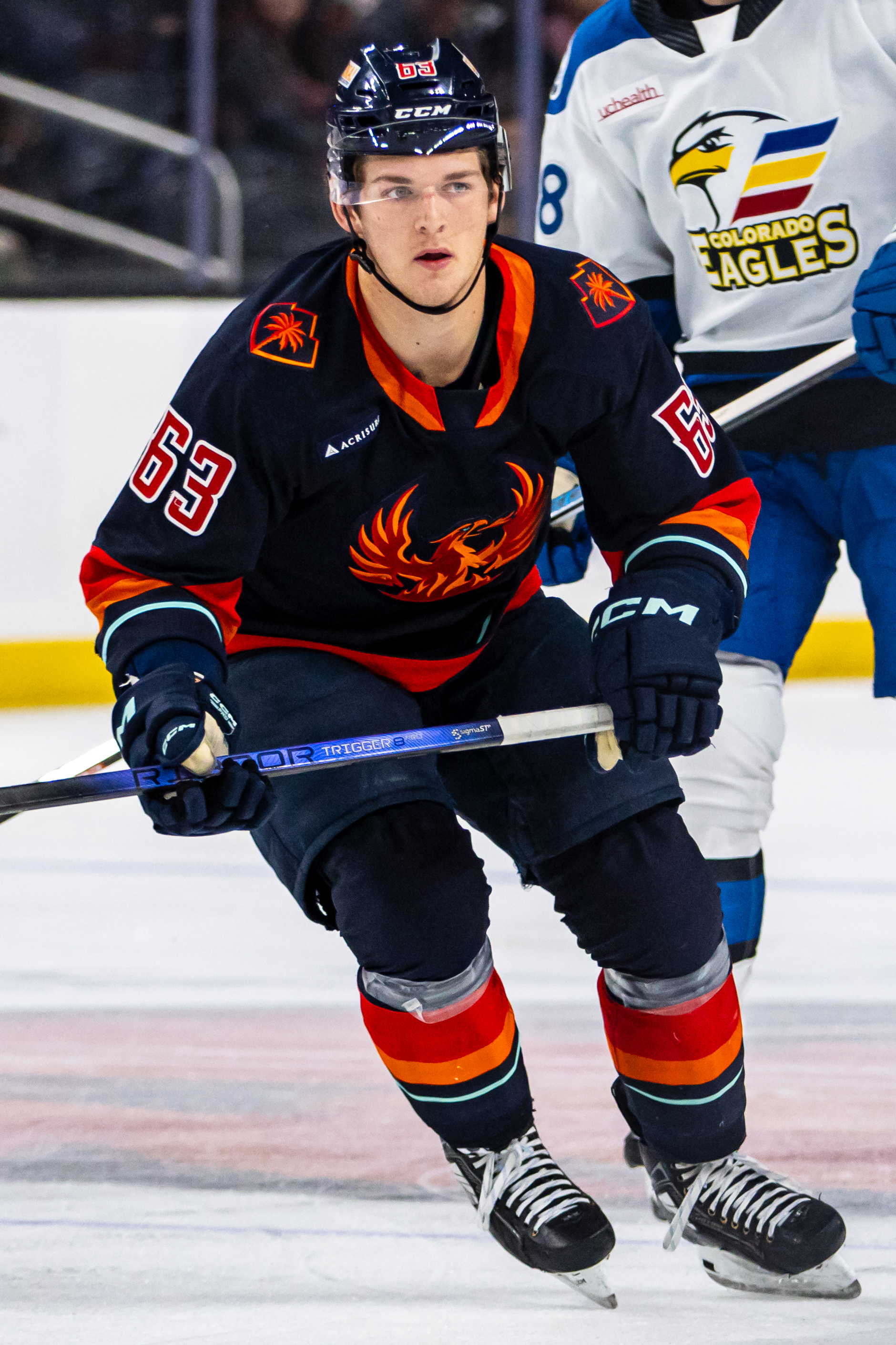
- Melanson with the Coachella Valley Firebirds in 2024
- Born: April 22, 2003 (age 23) Amherst, Nova Scotia, Canada
- Height: 6 ft 1 in (185 cm)
- Weight: 205 lb (93 kg; 14 st 9 lb)
- Position: Right wing
- Shoots: Right
- NHL team: Seattle Kraken
- NHL draft: 131st overall, 2021; Seattle Kraken
- Playing career: 2023–present

Jacob Melanson (born April 22, 2003) is a Canadian professional ice hockey right winger for the Seattle Kraken of the National Hockey League (NHL). He was selected 131st overall by the Kraken in the 2021 NHL entry draft.

== Playing career ==
Melanson played bantam hockey with the Truro Bearcats of the Nova Scotia Major Bantam Hockey League during the 2016–17 and 2017–18 seasons. He then joined the Weeks Major Midgets of the Nova Scotia U18 Major Hockey League while serving as an affiliated player for the Amherst Ramblers during the 2018–19 season. Melanson was then selected 15th overall in the 2019 Quebec Major Junior Hockey League entry draft by the Quebec Remparts.

Melanson then joined the Acadie–Bathurst Titan in the 2019–20 season. Melanson was then drafted by the Seattle Kraken in the fifth round, 131st overall, in the 2021 NHL entry draft. He stayed with the Titan until he was acquired by the Sherbrooke Phoenix during the 2022–23 season. On July 13, 2022, Melanson signed a 3-year, entry-level contract with the Kraken.

In a Kraken preseason game on September 26, 2022, against the Edmonton Oilers, Melanson received the first suspension in Kraken franchise history, with an illegal check to the head against Oilers forward James Hamblin with 2:42 remaining in the second period. He received a match penalty and was suspended two games.

== Career statistics ==
			Regular season					Playoffs
Season	Team	League	GP	G	A	Pts	PIM	GP	G	A	Pts	PIM
2016–17	Truro Bearcats	NSMBHL	33	19	6	25	48	2	1	0	1	4
2017–18	Truro Bearcats	NSMBHL	31	44	32	76	76	2	3	3	6	8
2018–19	Weeks Majors U-18	NSU18MHL	32	20	21	41	63	3	1	1	2	6
2018–19	Amherst Ramblers	MHL	1	1	2	3	0	3	0	0	0	2
2019–20	Quebec Remparts	QMJHL	39	3	7	10	19	—	—	—	—	—
2020–21	Acadie–Bathurst Titan	QMJHL	18	8	11	19	26	5	2	1	3	16
2021–22	Acadie–Bathurst Titan	QMJHL	54	35	21	56	85	8	4	2	6	10
2022–23	Acadie–Bathurst Titan	QMJHL	27	25	19	44	35	—	—	—	—	—
2022–23	Sherbrooke Phoenix	QMJHL	32	25	30	55	20	14	8	7	15	12
2022–23	Coachella Valley Firebirds	AHL	—	—	—	—	—	1	0	0	0	0
2023–24	Coachella Valley Firebirds	AHL	62	6	12	18	87	18	2	4	6	18
2024–25	Coachella Valley Firebirds	AHL	42	8	5	13	48	6	1	2	3	10
2024–25	Seattle Kraken	NHL	1	0	0	0	0	—	—	—	—	—
2025–26	Coachella Valley Firebirds	AHL	28	9	10	19	28	11	1	4	5	16
2025–26	Seattle Kraken	NHL	36	2	3	5	32	—	—	—	—	—
NHL totals			37	2	3	5	32	—	—	—	—	—
