= Sean Gagnon =

Canadian ice hockey player

- Born: September 11, 1973 (age 51); Sault Ste. Marie, Ontario, Canada
- Height: 6 ft 4 in (193 cm)
- Weight: 225 lb (102 kg; 16 st 1 lb)
- Position: Defence
- Shot: Left
- Played for: Phoenix Coyotes; Ottawa Senators
- NHL draft: Undrafted
- Playing career: 1995–2007

Sean Gagnon (born September 11, 1973) is a Canadian former professional ice hockey defenceman who played in the National Hockey League for the Phoenix Coyotes and the Ottawa Senators between 1997 and 2001. He played a total of 12 regular season games (seven for Phoenix and five for Ottawa) scoring one assist and collecting 34 penalty minutes.

== Playing career ==
Gagnon was undrafted and began his professional career in the ECHL with the Dayton Bombers and scored 61 points in 136 games. He also racked up a total of 665 penalty minutes in his two seasons with the Bombers. This was followed by a spell in the International Hockey League with the Fort Wayne Komets where he scored 7 goals and 14 points in 72 games with 457 penalty minutes. He finished his career in Germany, playing two seasons in the 2nd Bundesliga for the Lausitzer Füchse. He also had spells in Europe playing in Finland's SM-liiga for Jokerit in 1999 and a brief stint in the Russian Super League for HC Neftekhimik Nizhnekamsk, playing two games in 2003.

== Career statistics ==
=== Regular season and playoffs ===
			Regular season					Playoffs
Season	Team	League	GP	G	A	Pts	PIM	GP	G	A	Pts	PIM
1990–91	Sault Ste. Marie Elks	GNML	46	21	26	47	218	—	—	—	—	—
1991–92	Sudbury Cubs	NOJHL	13	10	13	23	34	—	—	—	—	—
1991–92	Sudbury Wolves	OHL	44	3	4	7	60	5	0	1	1	4
1992–93	Sudbury Wolves	OHL	6	1	1	2	16	—	—	—	—	—
1992–93	Ottawa 67s	OHL	33	2	10	12	68	—	—	—	—	—
1992–93	Sault Ste. Marie Greyhounds	OHL	24	1	5	6	65	15	2	2	2	25
1992–93	Sault Ste. Marie Greyhounds	M-Cup	—	—	—	—	—	4	0	1	1	8
1993–94	Sault Ste. Marie Greyhounds	OHL	42	4	12	16	147	14	1	1	2	52
1994–95	Dayton Bombers	ECHL	68	9	23	32	339	8	0	3	3	69
1995–96	Dayton Bombers	ECHL	68	7	22	29	326	3	0	1	1	33
1996–97	Fort Wayne Komets	IHL	72	7	7	14	457	—	—	—	—	—
1997–98	Phoenix Coyotes	NHL	5	0	1	1	14	—	—	—	—	—
1997–98	Springfield Falcons	AHL	54	4	13	17	330	2	0	1	1	17
1998–99	Phoenix Coyotes	NHL	2	0	0	0	7	—	—	—	—	—
1998–99	Springfield Falcons	AHL	68	8	14	22	331	3	0	0	0	14
1999–00	Jokerit	FIN	42	3	5	8	183	11	4	1	5	22
2000–01	Ottawa Senators	NHL	5	0	0	0	13	—	—	—	—	—
2000–01	Grand Rapids Griffins	IHL	70	4	16	20	226	10	2	3	5	30
2001–02	Hartford Wolf Pack	AHL	42	3	5	8	200	—	—	—	—	—
2002–03	San Antonio Rampage	AHL	42	3	6	9	157	3	0	0	0	4
2003–04	Neftekhimik Nizhnekamsk	RSL	2	0	0	0	6	—	—	—	—	—
2003–04	Neftekhimik Nizhnekamsk-2	RUS-3	3	0	1	1	2	—	—	—	—	—
2003–04	Flint Generals	UHL	12	2	2	4	56	—	—	—	—	—
2003–04	Utah Grizzlies	AHL	7	0	0	0	6	—	—	—	—	—
2003–04	St. John's Maple Leafs	AHL	11	0	0	0	31	—	—	—	—	—
2004–05	Lausitzer Füchse	GER-2	35	11	15	26	205	4	0	2	2	6
2005–06	Lausitzer Füchse	GER-2	33	11	17	28	165	—	—	—	—	—
AHL totals			224	18	38	56	1055	8	0	1	1	35
NHL totals			12	0	1	1	34	—	—	—	—	—
