= 2025–26 NOJHL season =

48th season of the NOJHL

- League: NOJHL
- Sport: Junior ice hockey
- Duration: Regular season September–March; Playoffs; March–April
- Games: 286
- Teams: 11
- Total attendance: 95,930
- Streaming partner: FloSports

League championship
- Champions: Greater Sudbury Cubs
- Runners-up: Timmins Rock

NOJHL seasons
- ← 2024–25 2026–27 →

The league debuted a new official logo (right) ahead of the 2025–26 season.

The 2025–26 NOJHL season was the 48th season of the Northern Ontario Junior Hockey League (NOJHL).

The Greater Sudbury Cubs won their third consecutive league championship. The Cubs' ownership subsequently announced during the off-season that it was withdrawing from the league. They cited several reasons for the decision, specifically, "The changing landscape of Junior Tier 2 hockey, including the unfettered movement of players, open recruitment from other leagues, exodus of players to southern leagues for more exposure and the dwindling number of players in the game due to the high cost of participation has made it untenable to operate in the NOJHL."

The Elliot Lake Vikings franchise remained on a leave of absence due to the protracted closure of Rogers Arena, the team's official home in Elliot Lake. The team was forced to vacate the building, which is owned by the City of Elliot Lake, due to "structural concerns" at the beginning of the 2023–24 season. As a temporary solution, the team relocated to the Massey and District Community Centre some 45 miles (72 km) away in Blind River. In December 2024, after the Elliot Lake city council delayed the reopening of its arena until the 2025–26 season, the league placed the Vikings on leave for the rest of the 2024–25 season. In May 2025, the Vikings extended its leave of absence through the 2025–26 season. League commissioner, Robert Mazzuca, stated "We just don't know when the club will be able to resume activities as they wait for news on the status of their arena." On 19 March 2026, the NOJHL announced the Vikings' immediate reinstatement and return for the 2026–27 NOJHL season.

The league debuted a new logo that was designed by Paul Ainsworth, a graphic designer and NOJHL alumnus.

== Regular season ==
The regular season ran from 11 September 2025 through 15 March 2026. Each team played 52 games, including 25 at home, 25 away and two as part of the annual NOJHL showcase, which was held 7–8 October at the Gerry McCrory Countryside Sports Complex in Sudbury.

The first-place Greater Sudbury Cubs were awarded the James Aspen Trophy as the Regular Season Champions for the second consecutive year. The top eight teams advanced to the playoffs.

Standings
Rank	Team	GP	W	L	T	OTL	Pts
1	Greater Sudbury Cubs	52	39	8	3	2	83
2	Powassan Voodoos	52	36	13	1	2	75
3	Hearst Lumberjacks	52	36	13	0	3	75
4	Timmins Rock	52	34	14	0	4	72
5	Soo Thunderbirds	52	32	15	3	2	69
6	Espanola Paper Kings	52	27	21	1	3	58
7	Soo Eagles	52	23	26	2	1	49
8	Kirkland Lake Gold Miners	52	17	28	0	7	41
9	Blind River Beavers	52	17	31	0	4	38
10	Iroquois Falls Storm	52	15	32	2	3	35
11	French River Rapids	52	4	46	0	2	10

Source: "2025–26 Northern Ontario Junior Hockey League standings". hockeydb.com.

== Playoffs ==
2026 League championship
Copeland Cup – McNamara Trophy

Tournament details
- Dates: 19 March–22 April
- Teams: 8
- Defending champions: Greater Sudbury Cubs

Final positions
- Champions: Greater Sudbury Cubs (4th title)
- Runners-up: Timmins Rock
- Semifinalists: Soo Eagles; Hearst Lumberjacks

Tournament statistics
- Games played: 31
- Goals scored: 237 (7.65 per game)
- Attendance: 18,685 (603 per game)

Awards
- Playoff MVP: Mason Walker

Official website
- 2026 NOJHL playoffs

The top 8 teams in the regular season advanced to the playoffs. Each round of the playoffs is a single-elimination best-of-seven series. The Greater Sudbury Cubs swept all three rounds to win their third consecutive league championship and advance to the 2026 Centennial Cup national championship tournament in Summerside, Prince Edward Island.

Quarterfinals
Greater Sudbury	4
Kirkland Lake	0
Powassan	0
Soo Eagles	4
Hearst	4
Espanola	0
Timmins	4
Soo Thunderbirds	3

Semifinals
Greater Sudbury	4
Soo Eagles	0
Hearst	0
Timmins	4

Finals
Greater Sudbury	4
Timmins	0

Source: "NOJHL 2026 playoffs". nojhl.com. Northern Ontario Junior Hockey League.

=== Quarterfinal: Greater Sudbury Cubs v. Kirkland Lake Gold Miners ===
The first-place Greater Sudbury Cubs swept the eighth-place Kirkland Lake Gold Miners in four straight games.

19 March	Kirkland Lake	1:9	Greater Sudbury	T.M. Davies Community Centre	Recap
		First period
		Second period	(1) 04:06 (2) 18:18 power play
18:55 (1)		Third period	(3) 00:31 power play (4) 02:29 (5) 03:46 (6) 12:01 power play (7) 14:04 power play (8) 14:50 power play (9) 15:55 power play

20 March	Kirkland Lake	1:6	Greater Sudbury	T.M. Davies Community Centre	Recap
		First period	(1) 08:34
		Second period	(2) 02:32 (3) 06:53
18:27 (1)		Third period	(4) 07:54 short handed (5) 08:57 (6) 19:20

23 March	Greater Sudbury	2:1	Kirkland Lake	Joe Mavrinac Community Complex	Recap
		First period	(1) 15:27
		Second period
00:35 (1); 08:59 (2)		Third period

24 March	Greater Sudbury	10:3	Kirkland Lake	Joe Mavrinac Community Complex	Recap
00:25 (1) power play 06:42 (2); 09:28 (3)		First period	(1) 08:54
06:32 (4); 11:30 (5) short handed 14:07 (6)		Second period	(2) 17:46
04:27 (7) power play 10:25 (8); 11:26 (9) power play 17:58 (10)		Third period	(3) 02:34

Greater Sudbury Cubs win series 4:0

=== Quarterfinal: Powassan Voodoos v. Soo Eagles ===
The seventh-place Soo Eagles swept the second-place Powassan Voodoos in four straight games. The Voodoos appealed the result of game 4, citing an error by the on-ice officials that gave the Eagles a power play in overtime. The league and the Northern Ontario Hockey Association (NOHA) both rejected the appeal and the result was upheld.

20 March	Soo Eagles	7:4	Powassan	Powassan Sportsplex	Recap
06:25 (1); 10:30 (2)		First period
power play 04:08 (3) power play 19:20 (4)		Second period	(1) 02:54 (2) 18:42 short handed
08:59 (5) empty net 18:45 (6) empty net 19:25 (7)		Third period	(3) 05:05 (4) 07:18

21 March	Soo Eagles	6:1	Powassan	Powassan Sportsplex	Recap
05:10 (1)		First period	(1) 18:44
07:00 (2) power play 11:49 (3)		Second period
02:57 (4) short handed 05:35 (5) power play 16:57 (6)		Third period

24 March	Powassan	3:4	2OT	Soo Eagles	Pullar Stadium	Recap
14:53 (1)		First period		(1) 12:12 (2) 19:24
09:10 (2)		Second period
short handed 14:41 (3)		Third period		(3) 02:07
		Second overtime period		(4) 00:32

25 March	Powassan	2:3	OT	Soo Eagles	Pullar Stadium	Recap
11:25 (1)		First period		(1) 18:33
short handed 05:58 (2)		Second period		(2) 00:26
		Third period
		First overtime period		(3) 08:47 power play

Soo Eagles win series 4:0

=== Quarterfinal: Hearst Lumberjacks v. Espanola Paper Kings ===
The third-place Hearst Lumberjacks swept the sixth-place Espanola Paper Kings in four straight games.

20 March	Espanola	3:4	Hearst	Claude Larose Recreation Centre	Recap
08:05 (1)		First period	(1) 08:53
12:46 (2)		Second period
13:21 (3)		Third period	(2) 00:23 (3) 05:44 power play (4) 16:18 power play

21 March	Espanola	0:7	Hearst	Claude Larose Recreation Centre	Recap
		First period	(1) 11:13 power play (2) 14:19
		Second period	(3) 00:56 (4) 06:40
		Third period	(5) 05:03 (6) 13:34 power play (7) 19:36

24 March	Hearst	3:2	Espanola	Espanola Regional Recreation Complex	Recap
07:00 (1)		First period	(1) 05:58
08:23 (2); 16:46 (3)		Second period
		Third period	(2) 00:51

25 March	Hearst	8:7	Espanola	Espanola Regional Recreation Complex	Recap
08:41 (1); 10:10 (2); 12:02 (3)		First period	(1) 07:44 (2) 09:59 (3) 12:16 (4) 16:10
power play 01:20 (4); 04:50 (5)16:31 (6)		Second period	(5) 10:25 (6) 13:57 power play (7) 14:18
00:18 (7)		Third period
power play 00:53 (8)		Overtime

Hearst Lumberjacks win series 4:0

=== Quarterfinal: Timmins Rock v. Soo Thunderbirds ===
The 4th-place Timmins Rock defeated the 5th-place Soo Thunderbirds in four games to three.

20 March	Soo Thunderbirds	4:3	OT	Timmins	McIntyre Arena	Recap
11:29 (1)		First period
		Second period		(1) 18:57
02:31 (2); 13:25 (3)		Third period		(2) 16:24 power play (3) 18:43
06:19 (4)		First overtime period

21 March	Soo Thunderbirds	1:6	Timmins	McIntyre Arena	Recap
power play 01:53 (1)		First period	(1) 10:13
		Second period	(2) 00:26 (3) 14:24 power play
		Third period	(4) 00:26 (5) 05:51 power play (6) 12:59 power play

24 March	Timmins	2:3	Soo Thunderbirds	John Rhodes Community Centre	Recap
power play 15:31 (1)		First period	(1) 18:11 power play
		Second period	(2) 02:36 (3) 08:53 power play
07:35 (2)		Third period

25 March	Timmins	3:2	Soo Thunderbirds	John Rhodes Community Centre	Recap
		First period
04:37 (1)		Second period
02:33 (2)		Third period	(1) 02:13 (2) 14:42 power play
05:24 (3)		Overtime

27 March	Soo Thunderbirds	1:7	Timmins	McIntyre Arena	Recap
		First period	(1) 16:58 power play
power play 18:17 (1)		Second period	(2) 06:31 (3) 11:34 power play (4) 12:19
		Third period	(5) 03:02 (6) 08:48 (7) 16:05 power play

29 March	Timmins	1:4	Soo Thunderbirds	John Rhodes Community Centre	Recap
17:04 (1)		First period	(1) 02:55 (2) 15:44
		Second period
		Third period	(3) 12:50 (4) 19:57 empty net

31 March	Soo Thunderbirds	2:5	Timmins	McIntyre Arena	Recap
		First period	(1) 08:26 (2) 15:18
		Second period	(3) 05:21 power play (4) 18:15 power play
power play 11:50 (1) power play 12:41 (2)		Third period	(5) 19:31 empty net

Timmins Rock win series 4:3

=== Semifinal: Greater Sudbury Cubs v. Soo Eagles ===
The Greater Sudbury Cubs swept the Soo Eagles and advanced to the final round.

2 April	Soo Eagles	1:5	Greater Sudbury	T.M. Davies Community Centre	Recap
03:57 (1)		First period	(1) 11:55
		Second period
		Third period	(2) 06:23 (3) 08:35 power play (4) 12:10 (5) 19:18 empty net short handed

3 April	Soo Eagles	6:9	Greater Sudbury	T.M. Davies Community Centre	Recap
10:14 (1)		First period	(1) 17:10
power play 07:59 (2) power play 10:37 (3) power play 13:48 (4)		Second period	(2) 07:00 power play (3) 16:48 (4) 17:03
01:47 (5); 07:33 (6)		Third period	(5) 01:27 (6) 02:20 power play (7) 05:39 (8) 06:27 (9) 18:07 empty net short handed

6 April	Greater Sudbury	6:3	Soo Eagles	Pullar Stadium	Recap
		First period	(1) 13:58 power play
power play 09:10 (1); 14:07 (2)		Second period	(2) 12:59
03:16 (3); 09:10 (4); 10:30 (5); 18:34 (6)		Third period	(3) 00:49 power play

7 April	Greater Sudbury	4:3	OT	Soo Eagles	Pullar Stadium	Recap
13:01 (1); 14:02 (2)		First period		(1) 14:24
06:14 (3)		Second period		(2) 15:51
		Third period		(3) 13:00
power play 03:00 (4)		First overtime period

Greater Sudbury Cubs win series 4:0

=== Semifinal: Hearst Lumberjacks v. Timmins Rock ===
Timmins Rock swept the Hearst Lumberjacks and advanced to the final round.

2 April	Timmins	7:4	Hearst	Claude Larose Recreation Centre	Recap
		First period	(1) 10:48 power play (2) 16:30 power play
01:00 (1); 01:10 (2) power play 04:24 (3) power play 08:07 (4); 19:09 (5)		Second period
17:41 (6) empty net 19:40 (7)		Third period	(3) 05:13 (4) 08:05 power play

4 April	Timmins	5:2	Hearst	Claude Larose Recreation Centre	Recap
01:04 (1); 07:04 (2)		First period	(1) 15:19
01:10 (3); 07:46 (4)		Second period	(2) 18:30
06:45 (5)		Third period

6 April	Hearst	3:5	Timmins	McIntyre Arena	Recap
05:09 (1); 12:09 (2)		First period	(1) 08:50
08:31 (3)		Second period	(2) 04:43 shorthanded (3) 10:00
		Third period	(4) 06:57 (5) 19:37 empty net shorthanded

8 April	Hearst	1:5	Timmins	McIntyre Arena	Recap
		First period	(1) 04:22 (2) 09:24 (3) 12:15
		Second period	(4) 04:24 (5) 05:41
04:07 (1)		Third period

Timmins Rock win series 4:0

=== Final: Greater Sudbury Cubs v. Timmins Rock ===
The Greater Sudbury Cubs swept Timmins Rock and advanced to the 2026 Centennial Cup national championship.

16 April	Timmins Rock	3:9	Greater Sudbury	T.M. Davies Community Centre	Recap
power play 12:06 (1)		First period	(1) 14:33 (2) 17:32
		Second period	(3) 00:44 (4) 08:59 short handed (5) 12:37 power play
power play 00:26 (2) power play 02:43 (3)		Third period	(6) 03:13 (7) 12:03 (8) 14:37 (9) 17:09

17 April	Timmins Rock	3:4	Greater Sudbury	T.M. Davies Community Centre	Recap
short handed 09:09 (1)		First period	(1) 10:11 (2) 17:12
power play 13:33 (2)		Second period	(3) 16:41 (4) 18:30 power play
15:06 (3)		Third period

21 April	Greater Sudbury	3:0	Timmins Rock	McIntyre Arena	Recap
		First period
shorthanded 18:10 (1)		Second period
03:22 (2) empty net shorthanded 17:54 (3)		Third period

22 April	Greater Sudbury	3:2	OT	Timmins Rock	McIntyre Arena	Recap
01:23 (1)		First period		(1) 15:50
		Second period
06:22 (2)		Third period		(2) 08:57
15:35 (3)		First overtime period

Greater Sudbury Cubs win series 4:0

== National championship ==
The Greater Sudbury Cubs advanced to the national championship 2026 Centennial Cup tournament in Summerside, Prince Edward Island. They were eliminated from competition after losing three out of four matches in the prelimary round.

== Individual awards ==
Mathieu Comeau of the Hearst Lumberjacks was named Most Valuable Player of the regular season and NOJHL Scoring Champion with 33 goals and 69 assists.

Spencer Horgan of the Greater Sudbury Cubs was named Best Defenceman. He finished the 2025–26 season as the highest scoring defenceman with 72 points. He is also the NOJHL's all-time scoring leader among defencemen with 228 points.

Owen Smith of the Espanola Paper Kings was named Rookie of the Year. He scored the most points among rookies with 24 goals and 30 assists.

Frederic Cousineau of the Timmins Rock and Matthew Vahramian of the Greater Sudbury Cubs received the Wayne Chase Memorial Award for the Best Goals-Against Average. Both goaltenders finished the season with a GAA of 2.14.

Peter Goulet, head coach of the Powassan Voodoos, was named NOJHL Coach of the Year.

== Sources ==
- "Rogers family comes through with $3M for Elliot Lake arena". Sudbury.com. 25 November 2024.
- Calverley, Stephen (18 December 2024). "Council looks at 'indefinitely postponing' Rogers Arena reopening". ElliotLakeToday.com. Village Media.
- Dillman, Martha (18 December 2024). "Elliot Lake arena may not re-open until the fall of 2025". CBC News. CBC/Radio-Canada.
- Dillman, Martha (19 December 2024). "Elliot Lake arena reopening delayed 'indefinitely,' with bill for ongoing repairs 'unknown'". CBC News. CBC/Radio-Canada.
- Campbell, Ian (19 December 2024). "Elliot Lake council reacts to latest arena setback". CTV News Northern Ontario. Bell Media.
- Martin, Carol (20 December 2024). "Council officially delays reopening target for Rogers Arena". SooToday.com. Village Media.
- Russon, Randy (13 May 2025). "How the Sudbury Cubs won a second straight NOJHL title that included a playoff run and series win over the Soo Thunderbirds". saultthisweek.com. Postmedia.
- "CJHL announces leadership reappointments and major policy advancements at AGM". cjhlhockey.com. Canadian Junior Hockey League. 16 May 2025.
- "NOJHL commissioner re-elected as CJHL chair of the board". SooToday.com. Village Media. 19 May 2025.
- Russon, Randy (2 June 2025). "Elliot Lake Vikings stuck in limbo". saultthisweek.com. Postmedia.
- "New Hockey North Hall of Fame inducts first members". BayToday.ca. Village Media. 7 August 2025.
- Russon, Randy (7 August 2025). "Leaving Sault to play hockey -". hockeynewsnorth.com.
- "Powassan Voodoos are getting ready for their 2025-26 season with preseason tournament". North Bay Nugget. Postmedia. 13 August 2025.
- Sherratt, Brad (13 August 2025). "Kirkland Lake Gold Miners aiming to win NOJHL championship". Northern News. Postmedia.
- "NOJHL announces schedule for 2025 showcase". ElliotLakeToday.com. Village Media. 27 August 2025.
- "NOJHL makes changes to preseason schedule". TimminsToday.com. Village Media. 27 August 2025.
- "Kirkland Lake Gold Miners go 1-2 against trio of OJHL squads". northernnews.ca. Postmedia. 26 August 2025.
- "NOJHL preseason starts this weekend, with a new logo". CTV News. Bell Media. 19 August 2025.
- "NOJHL Announces October 7-8 for their 2025 Showcase in Sudbury". saultsports.com. TruHous Media. 26 August 2025.
- Russon, Randy (15 September 2025). "Ready, set, go in the N.O." saultthisweek.com. Postmedia.
- "Two Powassan Voodoos get regular season NOJHL awards". nugget.ca. Postmedia. 24 March 2026.
