= Sudbury Cubs =

- City: Sudbury, Ontario, Canada
- League: Northern Ontario Junior Hockey League
- Operated: 1976-1993
- Affiliates: Sudbury Wolves (OHL)

Franchise history
- 1976-1978: Sudbury North Stars
- 1978-1982: Sudbury Cubs
- 1982-1983: Sudbury North Stars
- 1983-1992: Sudbury Cubs
- 1992-1993: Nickel Centre Cubs

The Sudbury Cubs were a Junior "A" ice hockey team from Sudbury, Ontario, Canada. They are a part of the Northern Ontario Junior Hockey League.

== History ==
The North Stars jumped from juvenile with the Coniston Flyers and Nickel Centre Native Sons to Junior B in 1976.

In 1978, they were promoted to Jr. A as members of the Northern Ontario Junior Hockey League.

== Season-by-season results ==
| Season | GP | W | L | T | OTL | GF | GA | P | Results | Playoffs |
| 1978-79 | 40 | 23 | 13 | 4 | - | -- | -- | 50 | 1st NOJHL | Lost Final |
| 1979-80 | 40 | 13 | 23 | 4 | - | 209 | 223 | 30 | 5th NOJHL | |
| 1980-81 | 40 | 14 | 22 | 4 | - | 214 | 264 | 32 | 5th NOJHL | |
| 1981-82 | 42 | 14 | 26 | 2 | - | 193 | 259 | 30 | 6th NOJHL | |
| 1982-83 | 42 | 11 | 28 | 3 | - | 204 | 260 | 25 | 6th NOJHL | |
| 1983-84 | 40 | 8 | 26 | 6 | - | 214 | 350 | 22 | 5th NOJHL | |
| 1984-85 | 40 | 28 | 8 | 4 | - | 284 | 180 | 60 | 1st NOJHL | Won League |
| 1985-86 | 41 | 31 | 8 | 2 | - | 352 | 190 | 64 | 2nd NOJHL | Lost Final |
| 1986-87 | 38 | 24 | 10 | 4 | - | 294 | 205 | 52 | 1st NOJHL | |
| 1987-88 | 40 | 30 | 9 | 1 | - | 300 | 162 | 61 | 1st NOJHL | Won League |
| 1988-89 | 40 | 27 | 9 | 4 | - | 273 | 187 | 58 | 2nd NOJHL | Won League |
| 1989-90 | 40 | 40 | 0 | 0 | - | 352 | 124 | 80 | 1st NOJHL | Won League |
| 1990-91 | 40 | 34 | 4 | 2 | - | 303 | 118 | 70 | 1st NOJHL | Won League |
| 1991-92 | 48 | 25 | 18 | 5 | - | 287 | 220 | 55 | 5th NOJHL | |
| 1992-93 | 48 | 21 | 26 | 1 | - | 284 | 283 | 43 | 4th NOJHL | |

== Notable alumni ==
- Todd Bertuzzi
- Brian Savage
- Sean Gagnon
