= 2018–19 MHL season =

2018–19 MHL Season
- League: Maritime Junior Hockey League
- Sport: Hockey
- Teams: 12
- TV partner: FastHockey
- Finals champions: Yarmouth Mariners (2nd title)

MHL seasons
- 2017–18 2019–20

The 2018–19 Maritime Junior Hockey League season was the 52nd season in league history. The season consisted of 50 games played by each MHL team.

At the end of the regular season, the league's top teams competed for the Canadian Tire Cup, the league's playoff championship trophy. The team successful in winning the Canadian Tire Cup has a chance to compete for the 2019 Fred Page Cup to determine the Eastern Canadian Champion, and if successful in winning, the team will then move on to compete for the 2019 Royal Bank Cup to determine the 2019 Junior 'A' champion.

Canadian Tire became the new sponsor of the league's championship trophy.

== Team changes ==
The Woodstock Slammers relocated to Grand Falls, NB becoming the Grand Falls Rapids.

== Regular-season standings ==
Note: GP = Games played; W = Wins; L = Losses; OTL = Overtime losses; SL = Shootout losses; GF = Goals for; GA = Goals against; PTS = Points; STK = Streak; x = Clinched playoff spot y = Clinched division; z = Clinched first overall

Final standings

| Eastlink South Division | GP | W | L | OTL | SL | GF | GA | Pts. |
| Yarmouth Mariners | 50 | 36 | 9 | 3 | 2 | 219 | 142 | 77 |
| Amherst Ramblers | 50 | 36 | 11 | 1 | 2 | 204 | 134 | 75 |
| South Shore Lumberjacks | 50 | 27 | 20 | 3 | 0 | 211 | 200 | 57 |
| Truro Bearcats | 50 | 22 | 21 | 3 | 4 | 135 | 158 | 53 |
| Pictou County Crushers | 50 | 22 | 21 | 3 | 4 | 170 | 178 | 51 |
| Valley Wildcats | 50 | 6 | 40 | 4 | 0 | 93 | 240 | 16 |

| Eastlink North Division | GP | W | L | OTL | SL | GF | GA | Pts. |
| Summerside Western Capitals | 50 | 40 | 8 | 1 | 1 | 247 | 120 | 82 |
| Campbellton Tigers | 50 | 31 | 13 | 2 | 4 | 183 | 127 | 68 |
| Edmundston Blizzard | 50 | 26 | 17 | 6 | 1 | 189 | 162 | 59 |
| St. Stephen Aces | 50 | 20 | 27 | 3 | 0 | 138 | 174 | 43 |
| Miramichi Timberwolves | 50 | 19 | 28 | 3 | 0 | 150 | 218 | 41 |
| Grand Falls Rapids | 50 | 13 | 30 | 5 | 2 | 153 | 239 | 33 |

== Canadian Tire Cup playoffs ==
Quarter-finals
1 | Yarmouth | 4
4 | Truro | 0
South Division
2 | Amherst | 3
3 | South Shore | 4
1 | Summerside | 4
4 | St. Stephen | 0
North Division
2 | Campbellton | 4
3 | Edmundston | 1

Semi-finals
1 | Yarmouth | 4
3 | South Shore | 2
1 | Summerside | 2
2 | Campbellton | 4

Canadian Tire Cup Finals
S1 | Yarmouth | 4
N2 | Campbellton | 0
