= 2019 Dudley Hewitt Cup =

48th Central Canada Junior A ice hockey championship

2019 Central Region Championship
Dudley Hewitt Cup

Tournament details
- City: Cochrane, Ontario
- Dates: 30 April - 4 May 2019
- Teams: 4
- Host team: Cochrane Crunch

Final positions
- Champions: Oakville Blades
- Runner-up: Hearst Lumberjacks

Tournament statistics
- Games played: 8
- Goals scored: 52 (6.5 per game)

The 2019 Dudley Hewitt Cup was the 48th Central Canada regional championship for the Canadian Junior Hockey League. The competition included the championship Oakville Blades of the OJHL, the Hearst Lumberjacks of the NOJHL, the Thunder Bay North Stars of the SIJHL, and host team, the Cochrane Crunch of the NOJHL. The Oakville Blades won the tournament and advanced to the 2019 National Junior A Hockey Championship in Brooks, Alberta.

== Teams ==
The field of competition included the championship teams from the OJHL, the NOJHL, the SIJHL. The predetermined host team was also admitted to the tournament.

Oakville Blades (OJHL)
Regular Season:44-5-2-4 (1st in OJHL West Division)
Playoffs: Defeated Brampton Admirals 4-1, Defeated Buffalo Jr. Sabres 4-1, Defeated Markham Royals 4-1, Defeated Wellington Dukes 4-0 to win league championship.

Hearst Lumberjacks (NOJHL)
Regular Season:33-16-6-1 (1st in NOJHL East Division)
Playoffs: Defeated Timmins Rock 4-3, Defeated Powassan Voodoos 4-0, Defeated Soo Thunderbirds 4-3 to win league Championship.

Thunder Bay North Stars (SIJHL)
Regular Season:49-5-1-1 (1st in SJIHL)
Playoffs: Defeated Dryden Ice Dogs 4-1, Defeated Red Lake Miners 4-1.

Cochrane Crunch (Host)
Regular Season: 31-20-1-4 (5th in NOJHL East Division)
Playoffs: Defeated by Timmins Rock 2-0.

== Tournament ==
After the preliminary round robin, the undefeated Oakville Blades advanced to the final, the 2nd-place Cochrane Crunch and third-place Hearst Lumberjacks advanced to the semifinal, and the fourth-place Thunder Bay North Stars were eliminated from competition.

	Round robin	OB	CC	HL	TN
1	Oakville Blades		6-2	4-2	9-4
2	Cochrane Crunch	2-6		5-4	4-1
3	Hearst Lumberjacks	2-4	4-5		3-0
4	Thunder Bay North Stars	4-9	1-4	0-3	

=== Semifinals and final ===
The Hearst Lumberjacks shutout the Cochrane Crunch in the semifinal by a score of 6-0. The Oakville Blades won the tournament, after defeating the Lumberjacks by a score of 2-0 in the final, and advanced to the 2019 National Junior A Hockey Championship in Brooks, Alberta.

Semifinal		Final
		Oakville	2
Cochrane	0	Hearst	0
Hearst	6

== Sources ==
- "2019 Road to NJAC" (PDF). hockeycanada.ca.
- "2025 Centennial Cup Guide & Record Book" (PDF). hockeycanada.ca.
- "Cochrane to host major hockey championship next year". CBC News. CBC/Radio-Canada. 2 March 2018.
