= 2026–27 NOJHL season =

49th season of the NOJHL

- League: NOJHL
- Sport: Junior ice hockey
- Duration: Regular season September–March
- Games: 286
- Teams: 11
- Streaming partner: FloSports

NOJHL seasons
- ← 2025–26 2027–28 →

The 2026–27 season is the 49th of the Northern Ontario Junior Hockey League (NOJHL).

The Elliot Lake Vikings returned from a leave of absence that began mid-season in 2024–25 due to the temporary closure of its home arena.

The 2026 championship Greater Sudbury Cubs franchise folded. Its ownership cited "the changing landscape of Junior Tier 2 hockey, including the unfettered movement of players, open recruitment from other leagues, exodus of players to Southern leagues for more exposure and the dwindling number of players in the game due to the high cost of participation."

The NOJHL, and five other Ontario junior ice hockey leagues, adopted several rule changes pursuant to Hockey Canada's "Ontario Men's Junior Hockey Development pilot project". The initiative included a "transition" to the Ontario Hockey League (OHL) rule book and adopting International Ice Hockey Federation (IIHF) Rule 202 for facial protection. The initiative also aimed to address "severe regional imbalances" with roster-related rule changes.

Former Powassan Voodoos head coach, Peter Goulet, left to become an assistant coach for the Brantford Bulldogs of the OHL. The Voodoos hired Ty Pracek as its new head coach.

The regular season runs from 10 September 2025 to 14 March 2027. Each team plays 52 games and the eight best teams advance to post-season.

== Sources ==
- "Rare three-peat: Greater Sudbury Cubs claim third straight NOJHL crown". Sudbury.com. Village Media. 23 April 2026.
- Perry, Thomas (17 June 2026). "NOJHL action unlikely to return to Cochrane in 2026–27". cochranetimespost.ca. Postmedia.
- Leeson, Ben (18 July 2026). "NOJHL responds to Greater Sudbury Cubs' withdrawal from league". thesudburystar.com. Postmedia.
- "NOJHL announces 2026 Showcase schedule". nojhl.com. Northern Ontario Junior Hockey League. 10 September 2026.
- "NOJHL Team Previews: Elliot Lake Vikings". nojhl.com. Northern Ontario Junior Hockey League. 9 September 2026.
- Shanahan, Brendan. "Players first: An interim report of the ongoing review to strengthen men's junior hockey in Ontario" (PDF). hockeycanada.ca. Hockey Canada.
- "Final report on men's junior hockey in Ontario published". hockeycanada.ca. Hockey Canada.
- "Shanahan report makes 11 recommendations to improve Ontario junior hockey". Global News. Corus News. The Canadian Press. 25 September 2026.
- Shanahan, Brendan. "Building the future of men's junior hockey in Ontario" (PDF). hockeycanada.ca. Hockey Canada.
- "Every NOJHL Team's Biggest Concern for the 2026–2027 Season". saultsports.com. 29 September 2026.
- Leeson, Ben (5 October 2026). "NOJHL's Robert Mazzuca talks season start, showcase, return to Sudbury". Sudbury Star. Postmedia.
- Pascal, Randy (7 October 2026). "NOJHL Showcase highlights dispersal of Sudbury talent across North". Sudbury Star. Postmedia.
