= Rayside-Balfour Sabrecats =

- City: Rayside-Balfour, Ontario
- League: Northern Ontario Junior Hockey League
- Operated: 1962-2005
- Home arena: Rayside-Balfour Community Centre
- Colours: Grey, Blue, and White

Franchise history
- 1962-1969: Garson Falconbridge Native Sons
- 1969-1973: Chelmsford Canadiens
- 1973-1995: Rayside-Balfour Canadians
- 1995-2005: Rayside-Balfour Sabrecats

Championships
- Playoff championships: 7: 1996, 1997, 1998, 1999, 2000, 2001, 2002

The Rayside-Balfour Sabrecats were a Junior "A" ice hockey team from Rayside-Balfour, Ontario, Canada. This defunct hockey team was a part of the Northern Ontario Junior Hockey League.

== History ==
A very successful franchise, the Sabrecats won the Dudley Hewitt Cup three times (1997, 2000, and 2002) and a dynastic seven straight McNamara Trophies as NOJHL champions (1996–2002). In 2000, they reached the finals of the Royal Bank Cup, only to lose a heartbreaking 2–1 game to the host Fort McMurray Oil Barons. While still playing for the Sabrecats, goaltender Sébastien Laplante was selected in the 9th round (277th overall) by the Los Angeles Kings in the 2001 NHL entry draft.

The team was granted a one-year leave from the NOJHL in 2005, but in Spring 2006 the NOJHL announced that the Sabrecats will not be returning and have officially folded.

== Season-by-season results ==
Season	GP	W	L	T	OTL	GF	GA	P	Results	Playoffs
1962-63	38	22	15	1	-	208	175	45	4th NOJHA	Lost semi-final
1963-64	40	13	26	1	-	141	202	27	5th NOJHA	DNQ
1964-65	40	20	20	0	-	185	213	40	4th NOJHA	Won league
1965-66	40	4	36	0	-	148	337	8	5th NOJHA	DNQ
1966-67	40	21	19	0	-	225	222	42	4th NOJHA	Lost semi-final
1967-68	40	24	15	1	-	179	157	49	2nd NOJHA	Lost semi-final
1968-69	48	22	25	1	-	167	163	45	3rd NOJHA	Lost semi-final
1969-70	48	8	39	1	-	176	385	17	5th NOJHA	DNQ
1970-71	48	19	25	4	-	218	269	42	3rd NOJHA	Lost semi-final
1971-72	52	22	28	2	-	216	265	46	3rd NOJHA	Lost semi-final
1972-73	42	21	15	6	-	--	--	48	3rd NOHA Jr. B	Lost semi-final
1973-74	40	30	7	3	-	--	--	63	1st NOHA Jr. B	Won league, won NOHA
1974-75									NOHA Jr. B	Lost semi-final
1975-76									4th NOHA Jr. B	Lost semi-final
1976-77									6th NOHA Jr. B	DNQ
1977-78								20	6th NOHA Jr. B	DNQ
1978-79	40	20	17	3	-	--	--	43	5th NOJHL	
1979-80	40	18	20	2	-	197	194	38	4th NOJHL	
1980-81	40	9	26	5	-	203	257	23	6th NOJHL	
1981-82	42	14	25	3	-	209	273	31	5th NOJHL	
1982-83	42	19	16	7	-	275	256	45	3rd NOJHL	
1983-84	40	36	2	2	-	426	165	74	1st NOJHL	Won league
1984-85	40	23	15	2	-	349	287	48	3rd NOJHL	
1985-86	41	22	16	3	-	324	274	47	3rd NOJHL	
1986-87	Did not participate									
1987-88	40	22	15	3	-	275	211	47	3rd NOJHL	Lost final
1988-89	40	28	7	5	-	289	162	61	1st NOJHL	Lost final
1989-90	40	19	18	3	-	222	234	41	4th NOJHL	Lost final
1990-91	40	18	21	1	-	206	231	37	3rd NOJHL	Lost final
1991-92	48	39	7	2	-	482	195	80	1st NOJHL	Lost final
1992-93	48	33	13	2	-	353	242	68	3rd NOJHL	
1993-94	40	18	21	1	-	220	228	37	5th NOJHL	
1994-95	48	22	26	0	-	233	273	44	5th NOJHL	
1995-96	44	37	5	2	-	270	129	76	1st NOJHL	Won league
1996-97	40	36	3	1	-	296	112	73	1st NOJHL	Won league, won Dudley Hewitt Cup
1997-98	40	35	3	2	-	252	107	72	1st NOJHL	Won league
1998-99	40	32	7	1	-	213	106	65	1st NOJHL	Won league
1999-00	40	40	0	0	-	315	80	80	1st NOJHL	Won league, won Dudley Hewitt Cup
2000-01	40	35	3	0	2	284	101	72	1st NOJHL	Won league
2001-02	42	37	4	0	1	327	105	75	1st NOJHL	Won league, won Dudley Hewitt Cup
2002-03	48	30	16	2	-	263	178	62	3rd NOJHL	
2003-04	48	4	41	2	1	97	299	11	8th NOJHL	
2004-05	48	14	31	4	0	147	201	31	7th NOJHL	Lost quarter-final

== Past coaches ==
- Larry Bédard
