= Parry Sound Shamrocks =

- City: Parry Sound, Ontario, Canada
- League: Ontario Provincial Junior A Hockey League; Northern Ontario Junior Hockey League
- Operated: 1994-2002
- Home arena: Bobby Orr Community Centre
- Colours: Green, Navy, Grey, and White

Franchise history
- 1977-1987: Parry Sound Shamrocks
- 1988-1991: Parry Sound Brewers
- 1994-2002: Parry Sound Shamrocks

The Parry Sound Shamrocks were a Junior ice hockey team from Parry Sound, Ontario, Canada that played in the Ontario Provincial Junior A Hockey League.

== History ==
The Shamrocks were originally formed in 1994 as a member of the Northern Ontario Junior Hockey League, but in 1999 the team made the move to the Ontario Provincial Junior Hockey League from 1994 to 2002.

Parry Sound made the Northern Ontario Junior A Hockey League finals against the Rayside-Balfour Sabrecats in their final two seasons in the NOJHA in 1998 and 1999. The Shamrocks lost both final series.

Over the summer of 1999, the Parry Sound Shamrocks moved to the Ontario Provincial Junior Hockey League, where the team had planned to cut travel costs. The plan worked, but the Shamrocks managed to accumulate debts over $80,000. The Shamrocks ice time fees remain unpaid till this day, and unsuccessfully tried to get the Seguin Bruins to pay for the outstanding debt five years after the Shamrocks folded, and Bruins were an expansion team into the OPJHL at the time. However, the Bruins rarely played at the Bobby Orr Community Centre.

One of the most-successful players to have played for the Shamrocks was forward Darryl Boyce, who appeared in 2 games for the Shamrocks in 2000-01, and managed to rack up 14 minutes in penalties. He would go on to play in the OHL for 4 seasons and then play at the University of New Brunswick. After playing in 21 games with the Toronto Maple Leafs and Columbus Blue Jackets, he now plays in Finland as of 2014-15 after spending time in the AHL.

Information regarding the history of the team can be found at the Parry Sound Public Library.

Other players to have played for the Shamrocks. Eddy Lawrence, Ryan McCormack, Richard Penfold, Chris Renwick, Craig Brown, Rene Tache, John Simard, Ted Scriven, Mark Ideson, Darrin Cain, Jamie Biscardie, Shawn McTernin, Lyle Zulak, Steve Evanush, Chris Mahon, Jeff Thomas, Philip Campbell, Ryan Knox, Chris Stanley, Bobby Reed, Chris Lee, Dwayne Taylor, Trevor Thompson and Craig Stern.

== Season-by-season results ==
Season	GP	W	L	T	OTL	GF	GA	P	Results	Playoffs
1994-95	48	21	23	4	-	228	227	46	4th NOJHL	Lost semi-final
1995-96	44	19	23	2	-	176	218	40	4th NOJHL	Lost semi-final
1996-97	40	17	18	5	-	142	183	39	3rd NOJHL	Lost semi-final
1997-98	40	18	18	4	-	155	179	40	2nd NOJHL	Lost final
1998-99	40	26	13	1	-	194	134	53	2nd NOJHL	Lost final
1999-00	48	8	34	4	2	154	294	22	7th OPJHL-N	
2000-01	49	12	35	2	0	144	280	26	6th OPJHL-N	
2001-02	49	13	28	4	4	138	206	34	7th OPJHL-N	
