= Darryl Boyce =

Canadian ice hockey player

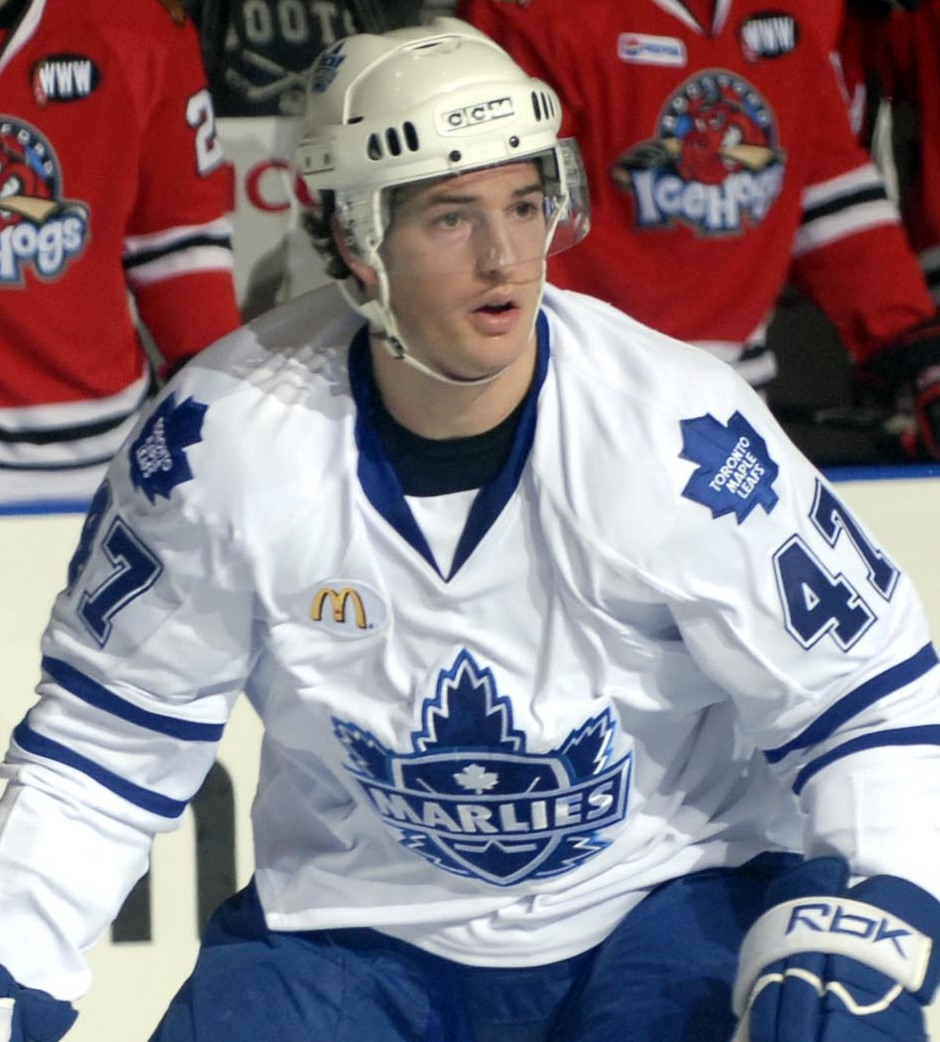
- Boyce with the Toronto Marlies in 2007
- Born: July 7, 1984 (age 42) Summerside, Prince Edward Island, Canada
- Height: 6 ft 0 in (183 cm)
- Weight: 200 lb (91 kg; 14 st 4 lb)
- Position: Centre
- Shot: Left
- Played for: Toronto Maple Leafs; Columbus Blue Jackets; JYP Jyväskylä; ERC Ingolstadt; Düsseldorfer EG
- NHL draft: Undrafted
- Playing career: 2007–2018

Darryl Boyce (born July 7, 1984) is a Canadian former professional ice hockey forward. He played with the Toronto Maple Leafs and the Columbus Blue Jackets in the National Hockey League (NHL).

== Playing career ==
Boyce's playing career got a kick start when he helped the Summerside Turk's Red Wings win an Island Junior Hockey League championship as an underage player in 1999–2000. Though much younger than his teammates at the time, he learned the ropes quickly and was an important part of their success. Before helping the Red Wings he helped guide the Summerside Kinsmen Midget AAA team to an Island Championship with his solid two way play and elite leader status. He also represented Team Atlantic at the World U17 that season in New Glasgow NS. He then moved on to play junior hockey for the Parry Sound Shamrocks of the OPJHL in 2000–01, before moving on to Major Junior with the St. Michael's Majors of the Ontario Hockey League.

With the Majors, from 2001–02 until 2004–05, Boyce skated in 262 OHL games, scoring 145 regular-season and 22 playoff points (the latter in 51 total playoff games)

Undrafted, Boyce enrolled with the University of New Brunswick where he played for the Varsity Reds. In his first season (2005–06), he was named UNB male rookie of the year with 32 points in 28 games. In his two seasons with the V-Reds he won a University Cup, the CIS men's hockey national championship.

Boyce began his professional career in the 2007–08 season, originally signing a contract with the Toronto Marlies of the American Hockey League. After starting the season with 22 points in 32 games with the Marlies, Boyce was signed by parent club, the Toronto Maple Leafs, to a two-year entry-level contract on January 1, 2008. Boyce was recalled to the Leafs to play his first NHL game on January 24, 2008, against the Washington Capitals, but only played 5 shifts as he left the game during his fifth shift with a separated shoulder. He played a total of 3 minutes and 20 seconds. He underwent successful surgery but missed the remainder of the season.

Boyce did not play his second NHL game until December 30, 2010, scoring his first NHL point, an assist, with the Leafs, against the Columbus Blue Jackets in Toronto. Two days later on January 1, 2011, he scored his first NHL goal in Ottawa against Mike Brodeur of the Senators.

On July 14, 2011, Boyce signed a one-year contract with the Maple Leafs. On February 25, 2012, he was picked up off of waivers by the Columbus Blue Jackets. He played in the final 20 regular season games for the Blue Jackets to end the 2011–12 season.

As a free agent upon the 2012–13 NHL lockout, Boyce was signed to a try-out contract with the Hamilton Bulldogs of the AHL on October 5, 2012. He began the 2012–13 season with the Bulldogs and played in 22 games scoring only 1 goal before he was subsequently released on December 15, 2012. In January, 2013, Boyce signed a contract with the reigning Finnish league champions JYP Jyväskylä.

In September 2013, he signed a one-year AHL contract with the Springfield Falcons, an affiliate of previous club the Columbus Blue Jackets. In the 2013–14 season, Boyce scored a professional high 32 points in 63 games with the Falcons. After his successful season with Springfield, Boyce opted to return for a second stint with JYP of the Finnish Liiga, signing a two-year contract on June 11, 2014. Following his two-year stint in Finland, Boyce accepted an offer from Germany, signing with ERC Ingolstadt of the Deutsche Eishockey Liga (DEL) in May 2016.

In his debut season in Germany in 2016–17, Boyce contributed with 31 points in 48 games. At the completion of his contract with Ingolstadt, Boyce opted to remain in the DEL, signing a two-year deal with rival club, Düsseldorfer EG on May 15, 2017.

On August 15, 2018, Boyce ended his 11-year professional career, transitioning to a coordinator of hockey operations and player development role, with the Moncton Wildcats of the Quebec Major Junior Hockey League.

== Career statistics ==
			Regular season					Playoffs
Season	Team	League	GP	G	A	Pts	PIM	GP	G	A	Pts	PIM
2000–01	Summerside Western Capitals	MJAHL	1	3	3	6	0	—	—	—	—	—
2000–01	Parry Sound Shamrocks	OPJHL	2	0	0	0	14	—	—	—	—	—
2001–02	Toronto St. Michael's Majors	OHL	67	10	11	21	71	15	2	5	7	46
2002–03	Toronto St. Michael's Majors	OHL	64	16	21	37	119	19	1	3	4	28
2003–04	Toronto St. Michael's Majors	OHL	64	13	24	37	110	18	1	3	4	23
2004–05	Toronto St. Michael's Majors	OHL	67	15	35	50	152	10	2	5	7	28
2005–06	University of New Brunswick	AUS	28	15	17	32	50	—	—	—	—	—
2006–07	University of New Brunswick	AUS	25	14	19	33	63	—	—	—	—	—
2007–08	Toronto Marlies	AHL	41	8	16	24	71	—	—	—	—	—
2007–08	Toronto Maple Leafs	NHL	1	0	0	0	0	—	—	—	—	—
2008–09	Toronto Marlies	AHL	73	12	18	30	131	6	2	0	2	27
2009–10	Toronto Marlies	AHL	20	2	9	11	48	—	—	—	—	—
2010–11	Toronto Marlies	AHL	35	6	10	16	48	—	—	—	—	—
2010–11	Toronto Maple Leafs	NHL	46	5	8	13	33	—	—	—	—	—
2011–12	Toronto Marlies	AHL	22	4	6	10	22	—	—	—	—	—
2011–12	Toronto Maple Leafs	NHL	17	1	1	2	16	—	—	—	—	—
2011–12	Columbus Blue Jackets	NHL	20	0	3	3	19	—	—	—	—	—
2012–13	Hamilton Bulldogs	AHL	22	1	6	7	27	—	—	—	—	—
2012–13	JYP Jyväskylä	SM-l	14	1	3	4	22	11	3	0	3	31
2013–14	Springfield Falcons	AHL	63	15	17	32	100	5	1	2	3	6
2014–15	JYP Jyväskylä	Liiga	57	10	15	25	82	12	0	2	2	4
2015–16	JYP Jyväskylä	Liiga	32	1	5	6	16	10	3	4	7	10
2016–17	ERC Ingolstadt	DEL	48	11	20	31	82	2	0	0	0	4
2017–18	Düsseldorfer EG	DEL	47	6	14	20	40	—	—	—	—	—
NHL totals			84	6	12	18	68	—	—	—	—	—
