= Capreol Hawks =

- City: Capreol, Ontario
- League: Northern Ontario Junior Hockey League
- Operated: 1970-1986
- Home arena: Capreol Community Centre
- Colours: Red, Black, and White

The Capreol Hawks were a Tier II Junior "A" ice hockey team from Capreol, Ontario, Canada. This defunct hockey team was a part of the Northern Ontario Junior Hockey League.

== History ==
The team started in 1978 and folded in 1986. Prior to 1978, the Hawks were members of the NOHA Jr. B League, where they won a league title in 1971. The team was founded in 1970 by Marshall and Bob Edwards. After winning the 1970 Midget Championship, the Edwards' thought that the Hawks would fare well in Junior "B". In their first season in the league, the Hawks won the League title. They folded in 1986, after Marshall Edwards left the team due to health problems.

== Season-by-season results ==
| Season | GP | W | L | T | GF | GA | Pts | Results | Playoffs |
|---|---|---|---|---|---|---|---|---|---|
| 1978–79 | 40 | 21 | 16 | 3 | — | — | 45 | 4th NOJHL | |
| 1979–80 | 40 | 23 | 11 | 6 | 267 | 232 | 52 | 2nd NOJHL | Lost Final |
| 1980–81 | 40 | 27 | 9 | 4 | 246 | 190 | 58 | 1st NOJHL | Lost Final |
| 1981–82 | 42 | 18 | 20 | 4 | 235 | 243 | 40 | 4th NOJHL | |
| 1982–83 | 42 | 9 | 28 | 5 | 201 | 303 | 23 | 7th NOJHL | |
| 1983–84 | 40 | 15 | 15 | 10 | 262 | 260 | 40 | 3rd NOJHL | |
| 1984–85 | 40 | 23 | 12 | 5 | 279 | 189 | 51 | 1st NOJHL | Lost Final |
| 1985–86 | 35 | 10 | 23 | 2 | 177 | 292 | 22 | 6th NOJHL | |

== Alumni ==
- Shannon Hope
