= Onaping Falls Huskies =

Canadian junior ice hockey team (1970–1986)

- City: Onaping Falls, Ontario
- League: Northern Ontario Junior Hockey League
- Operated: 1970–1986
- Home arena: Jim Coady Arena
- Colours: Blue, red, and white

Franchise history
- 1970–1974: Levack Miners
- 1974–1986: Onaping Falls Huskies

Championships
- Playoff championships: 9 (1972, 1975, 1976, 1977, 1978, 1980, 1981, 1982, 1986)

The Onaping Falls Huskies were a junior ice hockey team from Onaping Falls, Ontario, Canada, and were members of the Northern Ontario Junior Hockey League (NOJHL) from 1970 to 1986. The Huskies won nine league championships.

== History ==
As the Levack Miners, the team won the 1972 NOHA Jr. B League. In 1974, they changed their name to the Onaping Falls Huskies and won four consecutive NOHA Jr. B League titles (1975, 1976, 1977, and 1978) and three branch titles (1975, 1976, and 1978). They, and their league, were promoted to Jr. A in the summer of 1978.

Playing exclusively in the NOJHL from 1978 to 1986, the Onaping Falls Huskies were a very successful team, winning four league titles in their seven seasons. They won the McNamara Cup in 1980, 1981, 1982, and 1986. At the national level, they were never able to defeat the champions of the Ontario Provincial Junior A Hockey League, however, and therefore never advanced to compete for the Dudley Hewitt Cup.

In 1980, the Huskies were swept by the North York Rangers 3-games-to-none. In 1981, they were swept by the Belleville Bulls 3-games-to-none. And in 1982, the Huskies were swept by the Guelph Platers 3-games-to-none. Both Belleville and Guelph were granted expansion into the Ontario Hockey League soon after these playoff runs. In 1986, the Huskies faced the dominant Orillia Travelways and lost 4-games-to-2.

== Season-by-season results ==
Season	GP	W	L	T	GF	GA	P	Results	Playoffs
1978–79	40	19	14	7	—	—	45	3rd NOJHL	—
1979–80	40	29	10	1	256	166	59	1st NOJHL	Won League
1980–81	40	24	12	4	294	201	52	2nd NOJHL	Won League
1981–82	42	31	9	2	272	169	64	1st NOJHL	Won League
1982–83	42	30	9	3	294	181	63	1st NOJHL	—
1983–84	did dot play								
1984–85	40	16	21	3	253	261	35	4th NOJHL	—
1985–86	41	31	6	4	419	181	66	1st NOJHL	Won League
