= Rouyn-Noranda Capitales =

Ice hockey team from Quebec, Canada

- City: Rouyn-Noranda, Quebec
- League: Northern Ontario Junior Hockey League
- Operated: 1989-1996
- Home arena: Dave Keon Arena
- Colours: Red and White

The Rouyn-Noranda Capitales were a Junior "A" ice hockey team from Rouyn-Noranda, Quebec, Canada.

== History ==
This defunct hockey team was a part of the Northern Ontario Junior Hockey League. The team disbanded to make way for their city's Quebec Major Junior Hockey League franchise, the Rouyn-Noranda Huskies.

Some of their players were on the Northern Ontario Junior Hockey League (NOJHL) all star teams list.

The Capitales were the first Québécois team in NOJHL history. The Capitales left in 1996. There would not be a new Quebec-based team in the league until 2008 when the NOJHL allowed the expansion of the Temiscaming Royals.

== Season-by-season results ==
Season	GP	W	L	T	OTL	GF	GA	P	Results	Playoffs
1989-90	40	21	18	1	-	234	212	43	2nd NOJHL	Lost Final
1990-91	40	17	22	1	-	197	225	35	4th NOJHL	
1991-92	48	27	19	2	-	299	215	56	4th NOJHL	
1992-93	48	21	27	0	-	242	278	42	5th NOJHL	
1993-94	40	21	16	3	-	257	270	45	3rd NOJHL	Lost Final
1994-95	48	33	12	3	-	295	175	69	2nd NOJHL	Lost Final
1995-96	44	14	28	2	-	196	235	30	5th NOJHL	
