= 2019 Fred Page Cup =

Eastern Region Jr A Championship

Tournament details
- Venue: Amherst Stadium in Amherst, Nova Scotia
- Host team: Amherst Ramblers

Final positions
- Champions: Ottawa Jr. Senators
- Runners-up: Princeville Titans

Tournament statistics
- Games played: 8

The 2019 Fred Page Cup was the 25th Canadian eastern junior A ice hockey championship for the Canadian Junior Hockey League. The Amherst Ramblers hosted for the first time in team history. The tournament was held May 1 to May 5 at Amherst Stadium in Amherst, Nova Scotia. The tournament champions qualified for the 2019 National Junior A Hockey Championship, held in Brooks, Alberta, and hosted by the Alberta Junior Hockey League's Brooks Bandits at the Centennial Regional Arena.

== Teams ==
- Amherst Ramblers (Host)

Regular Season: 36-11-1-2 (2nd in MHL South Division)
Playoffs: Lost to South Shore Lumberjacks 4-3.

- Yarmouth Mariners (MHL champions)

Regular Season: 36-9-3-2 (1st in MHL South Division)
Playoffs: Defeated Truro Bearcats 4-0, Defeated South Shore Lumberjacks 4-2, Defeated Campbellton Tigers 4-0 to win the league.

- Ottawa Jr. Senators (CCHL champions)

Regular Season: 43-16-3 (1st in CCHL Yzerman Division)
Playoffs: Defeated Kanata Lasers 4-1, Defeated Brockville Braves 4-0, Defeated Carleton Place Canadians 4-1 to win the league.

- Princeville Titans (QJHL champions)

Regular Season:35-9-2-2 (3rd in QJHL)
Playoffs: Defeated St-Jérôme Panthers 4-2, Defeated Longueuil Collège Français 4-1, Defeated Terrebonne Cobras 4-1.

== Tournament ==
=== Standings ===
Rank	Team	League	W–OTW–L–OTL	GF	GA	Pts.
1	Princeville Titans	LHJQ	2–1–0–0	12	5	8
2	Ottawa Jr. Senators	CCHL	2–0–0–1	12	7	7
3	Amherst Ramblers (host)	MHL	1–0–2–0	6	12	3
4	Yarmouth Mariners	MHL	0–0–3–0	7	13	0

Tie Breaker: Head-to-head, then three-way +/-.

=== Round-robin results ===
Game	Date	Away team	Score	Home team	Score	Notes
1	May 1	Princeville	3	Yarmouth	2	F
2	May 1	Ottawa	4	Amherst	1	F
3	May 2	Ottawa	3	Princeville	4	F/OT
4	May 2	Yarmouth	3	Amherst	5	F
5	May 3	Yarmouth	2	Ottawa	5	F
6	May 3	Amherst	0	Princeville	5	F

=== Semifinals and final ===
Game	Date	Away team	Score	Home team	Score	Notes
7	May 4	Amherst	3	Ottawa	4	F
8	May 5	Ottawa	9	Princeville	2	F

== Sources ==
- Cole, Darrell (12 October 2017). "Ramblers awarded 2019 Fred Page Cup". saltwire.com. Postmedia.
- La Rose, Jason (1 May 2019). "Road to the 2019 National Junior A Championship: Fred Page Cup". hockeycanada.ca (Press release).
- "Road to the NJAC" (PDF). hockeycanada.ca.
- Cole, Darrell (10 December 2018). "Amherst's Fred Page Cup host committee on target for 2019 tournament in May". saltwire.com. Postmedia.
- Cole, Darrell (27 May 2019). "Tournament chairman looks back at what was a successful Fred Page Cup". saltwire.com. Postmedia.
- Cole, Darrell (26 April 2019). "Junior Senators come to Fred Page Cup as defending champions". saltwire.com. Postmedia.
- Mathieson, Dave (5 May 2019). "Last-second goal lifts Ottawa over Amherst". saltwire.com. Postmedia.
- Cole, Darrell (5 May 2019). "Ottawa Jr. Senators win second consecutive Fred Page Cup in convincing style". saltwire.com. Postmedia.
- Cole, Darrell (25 April 2019). "Yarmouth enters Fred Page Cup on a roll". saltwire.com. Postmedia.
- Cole, Darrell (1 May 2019). "Amherst Ramblers ready for Fred Page Cup". saltwire.com. Postmedia.
- Cole, Darrell (10 December 2017). "World Junior A exhibition game a test for Amherst Stadium". saltwire.com. Postmedia.
- Cole, Darrell (13 March 2018). "Fred Page Cup ticket details released". saltwire.com. Postmedia.
- Fraser, Jeremy (3 May 2019). "Yarmouth Mariners eliminated from Fred Page Cup". saltwire.com. Postmedia.
- Kurjata, Andrew (18 April 2019). "Hockey royalty: Prince George Spruce Kings celebrate winning 1st ever BCHL championship". CBC News. CBC/Radio-Canada.
- "Bogart Cup Recap | Jr Senators crowned Bogart Cup champs for second straight season". thecchl.ca. 22 April 2019.
- Comeau, Tina (20 April 2019). "Yarmouth Mariners are MHL Canadian Tire Cup champions after sweeping Campbellton Tigers in league final". saltwire.com. Postmedia.
