= French River Rapids =

- City: Noëlville, Ontario
- League: Northern Ontario Junior Hockey League
- Founded: 2015
- Home arena: Noelville Arena
- Colours: Blue, red, and white
- General manager: Paul Frustaglio
- Head coach: Paul Frustaglio
- Affiliate: Sudbury Wolves (OHL)

The French River Rapids are a Canadian Junior "A" ice hockey team based out of Noelville, Ontario. They are members of the Northern Ontario Junior Hockey League and play their home games at Noelville Arena.

== History ==
The Rapids were one of two expansion teams that entered the Northern Ontario Junior Hockey League (NOJHL) prior to the start of the 2015–16 season along with the Espanola Express. The team hired former NHL defenseman Moe Mantha, Jr. as its first general manager and head coach. The team played its first game on September 11, 2015, losing at home 6-5 to the Powassan Voodoos before a crowd of 450. After losing the first 13 games in franchise history, the team picked up its first victory with a 3-2 overtime win against the Espanola Express, the other expansion team. Moe Mantha, Jr. left the club near the end of the season to take over as the interim head coach of the Saginaw Spirit. His record as head coach of the club was 1–41–1–1.

In summer 2016, the French River Rapids came under new ownership when Jessy Landry purchased the franchise from original owner Allan Donnan. Landry then assumed the role of president and general manager and was able to get Mantha to return as head coach of the Rapids. However, after the team was assured of another last place finish in the league, Landry stepped down in February 2017. In April 2017, under new management of team president Paul Frustaglio, the Rapids named Sherwood Bassin the director of hockey operations and Ken Strong as head coach.

Towards the start of the 2017–18 season, the Rapids had a four-game win streak (surpassing their total wins in a season) within their first ten games.

== Season-by-season records ==
| Season | GP | W | L | T | OTL | GF | GA | Pts | Result | Playoffs |
|---|---|---|---|---|---|---|---|---|---|---|
| 2015–16 | 54 | 2 | 49 | 1 | 2 | 124 | 347 | 7 | 6th of 6, East; 12th of 12, NOJHL | Did not qualify |
| 2016–17 | 56 | 3 | 51 | 1 | 1 | 128 | 376 | 8 | 6th of 6, East; 12th of 12, NOJHL | Did not qualify |
| 2017–18 | 56 | 13 | 38 | 0 | 5 | 164 | 287 | 31 | 6th of 6, East; 11th of 12, NOJHL | Did not qualify |
| 2018–19 | 56 | 14 | 39 | — | 3 | 155 | 244 | 31 | 6th of 6, East; 11th of 12, NOJHL | Did not qualify |
| 2019–20 | 56 | 13 | 38 | — | 5 | 136 | 250 | 31 | 6th of 6, East; 11th of 12, NOJHL | Did not qualify |
| 2020–21 | 8 | 4 | 4 | — | 0 | 36 | 38 | 8 | Withdrew from season due to the COVID-19 pandemic | |
| 2021–22 | 48 | 23 | 24 | 1 | 0 | 197 | 196 | 47 | 4th of 6, East; 8th of 12, NOJHL | Won E Qualifier 0-2 (Kirkland Lake Gold Miners); Lost E Div Semifinal 0-4 (Timmins Rock) |
| 2022–23 | 58 | 9 | 46 | 2 | 1 | 145 | 304 | 21 | 4th of 6, East; 10th of 12, NOJHL | Lost E Div Semifinal 0-4 (Timmins Rock) |
| 2023–24 | 58 | 10 | 46 | 1 | 1 | 164 | 344 | 22 | 6th of 6, East; 11th of 12, NOJHL | Did not qualify |
| 2024–25 | 52 | 16 | 33 | 1 | 2 | 147 | 244 | 35 | 6th of 6, East; 10th of 12, NOJHL | Did not qualify |
