= 2019 National Junior A Championship =

Tournament details
- Venue: Centennial Regional Arena in Brooks, Alberta
- Dates: May 11–19, 2019
- Host team: Brooks Bandits

Final positions
- Champions: Brooks Bandits
- Runners-up: Prince George Spruce Kings

Tournament statistics
- Games played: 13
- Scoring leader: Dylan Anhorn (Prince George)

Awards
- MVP: Francis Boisvert (Ottawa)

The 2019 National Junior A Championship was the 49th Canadian junior A ice hockey national championship for the Canadian Junior Hockey League and the 49th consecutive year a national championship was awarded to this skill level since the breakaway of Major Junior hockey in 1970. The tournament was played at the Centennial Regional Arena in Brooks, Alberta from May 11 to 19, 2019. The event and championship trophy were without a sponsor or title for this year following the ending of Royal Bank of Canada's partnership with Hockey Canada; Hockey Canada formally reinstated the Centennial Cup as the Junior 'A' championship in the summer of 2019.

== Teams ==
- Brooks Bandits (Host)
- Prince George Spruce Kings (Pacific) (Note: The Brooks Bandits won the 2019 Inter Pipeline Cup AJHL Championship and played the Prince George Spruce Kings in the Doyle Cup; the winner normally advances to the National Championship. Because Brooks has already earned an entry to the tournament as host, Prince George had also automatically earned an entry to the tournament as the Pacific Region representative, The Spruce Kings also went on to win the Doyle Cup over the Bandits.)
- Portage Terriers (Western)
- Oakville Blades (Central)
- Ottawa Jr. Senators (Eastern)

== Tournament ==
=== Round-robin ===
Rank	Team	League	Ticket	W–OTW–L–OTL	Points
1	Brooks Bandits	AJHL	Host	4–0–0–0	12
2	Prince George Spruce Kings	BCHL	Pacific	3–0–1–0	9
3	Oakville Blades	OJHL	Central	2–0–2–0	6
4	Ottawa Jr. Senators	CCHL	Eastern	1–0–3–0	3
5	Portage Terriers	MJHL	Western	0–0–4–0	0

==== Round-robin schedule ====
Game	Away team	Score	Home team
May 11, 2019
1	Ottawa Jr. Senators	3–0	Portage Terriers
2	Oakville Blades	3–7	Brooks Bandits
May 12, 2019
3	Prince George Spruce Kings	5–1	Oakville Blades
4	Brooks Bandits	5–3	Portage Terriers
May 13, 2019
5	Prince George Spruce Kings	4–0	Ottawa Jr. Senators
May 14, 2019
6	Portage Terriers	4–5	Oakville Blades
7	Ottawa Jr. Senators	1–2	Brooks Bandits
May 15, 2019
8	Portage Terriers	1–5	Prince George Spruce Kings
May 16, 2019
9	Oakville Blades	7–4	Ottawa Jr. Senators
10	Brooks Bandits	3–1	Prince George Spruce Kings

=== Finals ===
Semifinals; May 18
1	Brooks Bandits	4
4	Ottawa Jr. Senators	3
2	Prince George Spruce Kings	2
3	Oakville Blades	1

Championship; May 19
1	Brooks Bandits	4
2	Prince George Spruce Kings	3

== Awards ==
Roland Mercier Trophy (Tournament MVP): Francis Boisvert, Ottawa Jr. Senators
Top Forward: Ryan Mahshie, Brooks Bandits
Top Defencemen: Luke Bast, Brooks Bandits
Top Goaltender: Logan Neaton, Prince George Spruce Kings
Tubby Schmalz Trophy (Sportsmanship): Simon Gravel, Brooks Bandits
Top Scorer: Spencer Kersten, Oakville Blades

== Sources ==
- "Road to the NJAC" (PDF). hockeycanada.ca.
- Cole, Darrell (12 October 2017). "Ramblers awarded 2019 Fred Page Cup". saltwire.com. Postmedia.
- Mathieson, Dave (5 May 2019). "Last-second goal lifts Ottawa over Amherst". saltwire.com. Postmedia.
- Cole, Darrell (5 May 2019). "Ottawa Jr. Senators win second consecutive Fred Page Cup in convincing style". saltwire.com. Postmedia.
- "National Junior A Championship Team Preview: Brooks Bandits (AJHL)". cjhlhockey.com. 10 May 2019.
- "National Junior A Championship Team Preview: Ottawa Jr. A Senators (CCHL)". cjhlhockey.com. 10 May 2019.
- "National Junior A Championship Team Preview: Portage Terriers (MJHL)". cjhlhockey.com. 10 May 2019.
- "National Junior A Championship Team Preview: Prince George Spruce Kings (BCHL)". cjhlhockey.com. 10 May 2019.
- "National Junior A Championship Team Preview: Oakville Blades (OJHL)". cjhlhockey.com. 10 May 2019.
