= Northern Ontario Junior Hockey League =

Junior ice hockey league

- Current season or competition: 2026–27 NOJHL season
- Official logo
- Regions: Northeastern Ontario; Upper Michigan
- Commissioner: Robert Mazzuca
- Founded: 1978
- No. of teams: 11
- Associated title: Copeland Cup–McNamara Trophy
- Recent champions: Greater Sudbury Cubs (2026)
- Headquarters: Corbeil, Ontario
- Website: nojhl.com

The Northern Ontario Junior Hockey League (NOJHL) is a Junior ice hockey league with eleven teams in Northeastern Ontario and Upper Michigan. The league is a constituent member of the Canadian Junior Hockey League (CJHL) and is governed by the Northern Ontario Hockey Association. Teams compete to win the league championship Copeland Cup – McNamara Trophy, with the winning team advancing to the national championship to compete for the Centennial Cup.

The NOJHL was established in 1978 with six teams: the Espanola Eagles (1978–1988), Capreol Hawks (1978–1986), Nickel Centre Native Sons (1978–1984), Onaping Falls Huskies (1978–1983), Rayside-Balfour Canadians (1978–1986) and Sudbury Cubs (1978–1982). It was preceded by the NOJHA (1962–1972) and the NOHA Jr. B Hockey League (1970–1978).

By the 1986–87 season, the NOJHL was down to four teams. The Ontario Provincial Junior A Hockey League (OPJHL), also down to four teams, played an interlocking schedule with the NOJHL. The OPJHL folded after that season.

In the 2011–12 NOJHL season, the NOJHL became the first Junior A league in Canada to implement concussion safety and drug testing programs.

NOJHL teams won the Central Canada regional championship Dudley Hewitt Cup a total of five times, in 1997, 2000, 2002, 2012 and 2015. The regional contest was discontinued after 2019. As of 2025, no team from the NOJHL has won a national championship.

The league changed its official logo (right) ahead of the 2025–26 season.

== Teams ==
The league had 11 active teams during the 2026–27 season. In March 2026, the NOJHL announced the Elliot Lake Vikings' immediate reinstatement and expected return for the 2026–27 season. The Vikings franchise was placed on an indefinite leave of absence in the middle of the 2024–25 season.

Teams
Team	Home	Arena
Blind River Beavers	Blind River	Blind River Community Centre
Elliot Lake Vikings	Elliot Lake	Rogers Arena (Elliot Lake)
Espanola Paper Kings	Espanola	Espanola Regional Recreation Complex
French River Rapids	Noelville	Noelville Arena
Hearst Lumberjacks	Hearst	Claude Larose Recreation Centre
Iroquois Falls Storm	Iroquois Falls	Jus Jordan Arena
Kirkland Lake Gold Miners	Kirkland Lake	Joe Mavrinac Community Complex
Powassan Voodoos	Powassan	Powassan Sportsplex
Soo Eagles	Sault Ste. Marie, Michigan	Pullar Stadium
Soo Thunderbirds	Sault Ste. Marie, Ontario	John Rhodes Community Centre
Timmins Rock	Timmins	McIntyre Arena

Map of teams

=== Former teams ===
More than half of the teams that have played in the NOJHL no longer do. In some cases, this is the result of relocation or rebranding decisions. In others, franchises have simply folded. The team most recently added to the list, the Greater Sudbury Cubs, folded in 2026.

Former teams
Team	Centre	From	To	Reason
Capreol Hawks	Capreol	1978	1986	Folded
Copper Cliff Cubs	Copper Cliff	1970	1975	Folded
Coniston Flyers	Coniston	1976	1977	Folded
Elliot Lake Vikings	Elliot Lake	1981	1999	Folded
Espanola Eagles	Espanola	1962	2003	Rebranded
Espanola Rivermen	Espanola	2013	2014	Joined CIHL
Iroquois Falls Eskis	Iroquois Falls	1988	2017	Rebranded
Nickel Centre Native Sons	Nickel Centre	1978	1987	Folded
Onaping Falls Huskies	Onaping Falls	1978	1986	Folded
Parry Sound Shamrocks	Parry Sound	1994	1999	Joined OPJHL
Rayside-Balfour Sabrecats	Rayside-Balfour	1978	2005	Folded
Rouyn-Noranda Capitales	Rouyn-Noranda, Quebec	1989	1996	Folded
Sudbury Cubs	Sudbury	1978	1993	Folded
Temiscaming Royals	Temiscaming, Quebec	2008	2011	Folded
Thessalon Flyers	Thessalon	1987	1990	Folded
West Nipissing Alouettes	Sturgeon Falls	1973	1976	Folded
Greater Sudbury Cubs	Greater Sudbury	2021	2026	Folded

=== Timeline of teams ===
- 1978 – NOHA Jr. B Hockey League is promoted to Junior A and renamed Northern Ontario Junior Hockey League – League includes: Sudbury Cubs, Nickel Centre Native Sons, Onaping Falls Huskies, Capreol Hawks, Rayside-Balfour Canadians, and Espanola Eagles
- 1981 – Elliot Lake Vikings join from International Junior B Hockey League
- 1982 – Sudbury Cubs become Sudbury North Stars
- 1983 – Onaping Falls Huskies leave league
- 1983 – Sudbury North Stars return to Sudbury Cubs
- 1984 – Onaping Falls Huskies rejoin league
- 1984 – Nickel Centre Native Sons leave league
- 1985 – Nickel Centre Native Sons rejoin league
- 1986 – Nickel Centre Native Sons renamed Nickel Centre Power Trains
- 1986 – Rayside-Balfour Canadians, Capreol Hawks, and Onaping Falls Huskies leave league
- 1987 – Rayside-Balfour Canadians rejoin league
- 1987 – Thessalon Flyers join league
- 1987 – Nickel Centre Power Trains leave league
- 1988 – Espanola Eagles leave league, franchise sold to Haileybury 54's
- 1989 – Rouyn-Noranda Capitales join league
- 1990 – Thessalon Flyers leave league
- 1990 – Haileybury 54's move and become Powassan Passport
- 1991 – Timmins Golden Bears and Espanola Eagles join league
- 1992 – Sudbury Cubs become Nickel Centre Cubs
- 1992 – Powassan Passport become Powassan Hawks
- 1993 – Nickel Centre Cubs leave league
- 1994 – Parry Sound Shamrocks join league
- 1994 – Powassan Hawks move and are renamed Sturgeon Falls Lynx
- 1995 – Espanola Eagles leave league
- 1995 – Rayside-Balfour Canadians renamed Rayside-Balfour Sabrecats
- 1996 – Rouyn-Noranda Capitales disband to make way for Rouyn-Noranda Huskies of Quebec Major Junior Hockey League
- 1997 – Elliot Lake Vikings become Elliot Lake Ice
- 1998 – Espanola Eagles rejoin league
- 1999 – Timmins Golden Bears relocate and become Iroquois Falls Jr. Eskis
- 1999 – Soo Thunderbirds join league
- 1999 – Elliot Lake Ice leave league, franchise sold to Nickel Centre Barons
- 1999 – Parry Sound Shamrocks move to the Ontario Provincial Junior A Hockey League
- 2000 – Sudbury Northern Wolves join league
- 2000 – Nickel Centre Barons move and are renamed Blind River Barons
- 2001 – Blind River Barons renamed Blind River Beavers
- 2002 – Iroquois Fals Jr. Eskis are renamed Abitibi Eskimos
- 2002 – Sturgeon Falls Lynx move to North Bay and become the North Bay Skyhawks
- 2002 – Soo Thunderbirds are renamed Sault Ste. Marie Jr. Greyhounds
- 2003 – Espanola Eagles move to St. Ignace, Michigan and become the Northern Michigan Black Bears
- 2003 – Little Current awarded expansion franchise Manitoulin Wild
- 2003 – Sault Ste. Marie Jr. Greyhounds return to Soo Thunderbirds
- 2005 – Manitoulin Wild become Manitoulin Islanders
- 2005 – Rayside-Balfour Sabrecats are granted a one-year leave of absence
- 2005 – Sudbury Northern Wolves become Sudbury Jr. Wolves
- 2006 – Northern Michigan Black Bears are relocated and renamed Soo Indians
- 2006 – Rayside-Balfour Sabrecats officially fold
- 2007 – Soo Indians take one-year leave in search of new ownership
- 2008 – Temiscaming Royals join from Greater Metro Junior A Hockey League
- 2008 – Soo Indians return, renamed Soo Eagles
- 2009 – North Bay Skyhawks are renamed North Bay Trappers
- 2011 – Temiscaming Royals leave league
- 2011 – Manitoulin Islanders move and become Kirkland Lake Blue Devils
- 2011 – Sudbury Jr. Wolves are renamed Sudbury Cubs
- 2012 – Kirkland Lake Blue Devils fold/return as Kirkland Lake Gold Miners
- 2012 – Soo Eagles leave and join North American Hockey League
- 2012 – Elliot Lake Bobcats join from Greater Metro Junior A Hockey League
- 2012 – Sudbury Cubs are renamed Sudbury Nickel Barons
- 2013 – Espanola Rivermen join league as expansion
- 2014 – Espanola Rivermen leave league and join CIHL
- 2014 – Elliot Lake Bobcats move to Cochrane Ontario and become Cochrane Crunch
- 2014 – North Bay Trappers move to Mattawa Ontario and become Mattawa Blackhawks
- 2014 – Elliot Lake Wildcats join league as expansion
- 2014 – Powassan Voodoos join league as expansion
- 2015 – Abitibi Eskimos relocate to Timmins and become Timmins Rock
- 2015 – Mattawa Blackhawks relocate to Iroquois Falls and become Iroquois Falls Eskis
- 2015 – Sudbury Nickel Barons relocate to Chelmsford and become Rayside-Balfour Canadians
- 2015 – French River Rapids join league as expansion
- 2015 – Espanola Express join league as expansion
- 2015 – Soo Eagles rejoin league
- 2017 – Iroquois Falls Eskis relocate to Hearst and become Hearst Lumberjacks
- 2025 – Elliot Lake Vikings take leave of absence
- 2026 – Elliot Lake Vikings reinstated
- 2026 – Greater Sudbury Cubs folded

== Copeland-McNamara Trophy and Division Champions ==
In 2008–09, the NOJHL instituted divisions. Overall champions are bolded.

**NOHA Jr. B Era**
Year	Champion	Finalist
1971	**Copper Cliff Cubs/Sudbury Cubs**	Levack Miners
1972	**Levack Miners**	Sudbury Cubs
1973	**Copper Cliff Cubs/Coniston Cubs**	Levack Miners
1974	**Rayside-Balfour Canadians**	Coniston Cubs
1975	**Onaping Falls Huskies**	Capreol Hawks
1976	**Onaping Falls Huskies**	Capreol Hawks
1977	**Onaping Falls Huskies**	Capreol Hawks
1978	**Onaping Falls Huskies**	Nickel Centre Native Sons
**NOJHL Era**
Year	Champion	Finalist
1979	**Nickel Centre Native Sons**	Sudbury Cubs
1980	**Onaping Falls Huskies**	Capreol Hawks
1981	**Onaping Falls Huskies**	Capreol Hawks
1982	**Onaping Falls Huskies**	Elliot Lake Vikings
1983	**Elliot Lake Vikings**	Onaping Falls Huskies
1984	**Rayside-Balfour Canadians**	Elliot Lake Vikings
1985	**Sudbury Cubs**	Capreol Hawks
1986	**Onaping Falls Huskies**	Sudbury Cubs
1987	**Nickel Centre Power Trains**	Sudbury Cubs
1988	**Sudbury Cubs**	Elliot Lake Vikings
1989	**Sudbury Cubs**	Rayside-Balfour Canadians
1990	**Sudbury Cubs**	Rouyn-Noranda Capitales
1991	**Sudbury Cubs**	Rayside-Balfour Canadians
1992	**Powassan Hawks**	Rayside-Balfour Canadians
1993	**Powassan Hawks**	Timmins Golden Bears
1994	**Powassan Hawks**	Rouyn-Noranda Capitales
1995	**Timmins Golden Bears**	Rouyn-Noranda Capitales
1996	**Rayside-Balfour Sabrecats**	Sturgeon Falls Lynx
1997	**Rayside-Balfour Sabrecats**	Sturgeon Falls Lynx
1998	**Rayside-Balfour Sabrecats**	Parry Sound Shamrocks
1999	**Rayside-Balfour Sabrecats**	Parry Sound Shamrocks
2000	**Rayside-Balfour Sabrecats**	Sturgeon Falls Lynx
2001	**Rayside-Balfour Sabrecats**	Soo Thunderbirds
2002	**Rayside-Balfour Sabrecats**	Soo Thunderbirds
2003	**North Bay Skyhawks**	Sault Ste. Marie Jr. Greyhounds
2004	**North Bay Skyhawks**	Soo Thunderbirds
2005	**North Bay Skyhawks**	Northern Michigan Black Bears
2006	**Sudbury Jr. Wolves**	North Bay Skyhawks
2007	**Soo Indians**	Sudbury Jr. Wolves
2008	**Sudbury Jr. Wolves**	Abitibi Eskimos
	East	West
2009	North Bay Skyhawks	**Soo Thunderbirds**
2010	**Abitibi Eskimos**	Soo Thunderbirds
2011	Sudbury Jr. Wolves	**Soo Eagles**
2012	North Bay Trappers	**Soo Thunderbirds**
2013	**North Bay Trappers**	Soo Thunderbirds
2014	**Kirkland Lake Gold Miners**	Soo Thunderbirds
2015	Cochrane Crunch	**Soo Thunderbirds**
2016	Kirkland Lake Gold Miners	**Soo Thunderbirds**
2017	**Powassan Voodoos**	Blind River Beavers
2018	**Cochrane Crunch**	Rayside-Balfour Canadians
2019	**Hearst Lumberjacks**	Soo Thunderbirds
2020	Postseason cancelled due to COVID-19 pandemic	
2021	Postseason cancelled due to COVID-19 pandemic	
2022	Hearst Lumberjacks	**Soo Thunderbirds**
2023	**Timmins Rock**	Soo Thunderbirds
2024	Powassan Voodoos	**Greater Sudbury Cubs**
**NOJHL** Single Table
Year	Champion	Finalist
1979	**Greater Sudbury Cubs**	Hearst Lumberjacks

=== Dudley Hewitt Cup Central Canadian Champions ===
Year	Champion	Finalist	Host (if applicable)
1997	**Rayside-Balfour Sabrecats**	Milton Merchants (OPJHL)	--
2000	**Rayside-Balfour Sabrecats**	Brampton Capitals (OPJHL)	--
2002	**Rayside-Balfour Sabrecats**	Dryden Ice Dogs (SIJHL)	--
2012	**Soo Thunderbirds**	Stouffville Spirit (OJHL)	Thunder Bay, Ontario
2015	**Soo Thunderbirds**	Fort Frances Lakers (SIJHL)	Fort Frances, Ontario

=== Trophy gallery ===
**Frank L. Buckland Trophy**
- OHA Championship
- Competed for by NOJHL champions from 1979 until 1997
- Won in 1987, 1988, 1989, 1990, 1991, 1992, 1993, and 1997

**William T. Ruddock Trophy**
- OHF Championship
- Competed for by NOJHL champions since 1994
- Won in 1997, 2000, 2002, 2003, and 2006

**Dudley Hewitt Cup**
- Regional Championship
- Competed for by NOJHL champions since 1979
- Won in 1997, 2000, and 2002

== Notable alumni ==
- Todd Bertuzzi – Sudbury Cubs
- Brian Savage – Sudbury Cubs
- Steve Sullivan – Timmins Golden Bears
- Alex Auld – Sturgeon Falls Lynx
- Chris Thorburn – Elliot Lake Ice
- Jeremy Stevenson – Elliot Lake Vikings
- Jake Muzzin – Soo Thunderbirds
- Alex Henry – Timmins Golden Bears
- Dan Cloutier – Timmins Golden Bears
- Trevor Halverson – Thessalon Flyers
- Shannon Hope – Elliot Lake Vikings
- Lonnie Loach – Haileybury 54's
- Tyler Kennedy – Soo Thunderbirds
- Derek MacKenzie – Rayside-Balfour Sabrecats
- Colin Miller – Soo Thunderbirds
- Andrew Desjardins – Espanola Screaming Eagles

== League records ==
=== Team season ===
- Best Record, One Season:
  40–0–0 – Sudbury Cubs, 1989–90
  40–0–0 – Rayside-Balfour Sabrecats, 1999–00
- Worst Record, One Season:
  0–51–0–1 Blind River Beavers 2014–15
- Most Goals Scored, One Season:
  482 – Rayside-Balfour Canadians, 1991–92
- Fewest Goals Scored, One Season:
  97 – Rayside-Balfour Sabrecats, 2003–04
- Fewest Goals Against, One Season:
  80 – Rayside-Balfour Sabrecats, 1999–00
- Most Goals Against, One Season:
  708 – Elliot Lake Vikings, 1991–92

=== Team game ===
- Largest margin of victory:
  Rayside-Balfour Canadiens 30 – Elliot Lake Vikings 3 on January 28, 1992

=== Individual season ===
- Most Goals, One Season:
  97 – Denis Castonguay, Rayside Balfour Canadians, 1983–84
- Most Assists, One Season:
  106 – John Stos, Rayside Balfour Canadians, 1991–92
- Most Points, One Season:
  196 – Denis Castonguay, Rayside Balfour Canadians, 1983–84
- Most Penalty Minutes, One Season:
  384 – Andy Hodgins, Espanola Eagles, 1991–92
- Lowest Goals Against Average, One Season:
  1.99 – Justin Dumont, Rayside-Balfour Sabrecats, 1999–00
- Most Shutouts, One Season:
  9 – Connor Rykman, Soo Thunderbirds, 2015–16

=== Individual career ===
- Most Games Played, Career:
  268 – Matthew Neault, Blind River Beavers/Sudbury Nickel Barons/Rayside-Balfour Canadians, 2013–2018
- Most Goals, Career:
  197 – Denis Castonguay, Rayside-Balfour Canadians, 1979–1984
- Most Assists, Career:
  237 – Brian Verreault, Rayside-Balfour Canadians, 1979–1984
- Most Points, Career:
  409 – Brian Verreault, Rayside-Balfour Canadians, 1979–1984
- Most career points for a defenceman:
  228 – Spencer Horgan, Epanola Paper Kings & Greater Sudbury Cubs, 2022–2026
- Most Penalty Minutes, Career:
  919 – Dean Bowles, Elliot Lake Vikings, 1986–1991

== See also ==
- Northern Ontario Hockey Association
- Ontario Hockey Federation
- Canadian Junior Hockey League
- Hockey Canada

== Sources ==
- "Harrison offers historical look at NOJHL". nojhl.com. Northern Ontario Junior Hockey League. 30 July 2020.
- "NOJHL began play 60 years ago". nojhl.com. Northern Ontario Junior Hockey League. 22 January 2022.
- Erskine, Michael (15 November 2024). "GoFundMe campaign supports NOJHL team for Manitoulin". Manitoulin Expositor.
- Anderson, Gordon (25 July 2024). "A new direction: NOJHL implements new directives to improve development". saultstar.com. Postmedia.
- "All 12 NOJHL clubs hit the ice in Sudbury next week". sudbury.com. 26 September 2024.
- "New Things Coming Out of the NOJHL for the 2024–2025 Junior 'A' Season". saultsports.com. 18 July 2024.
- "No home ice advantage: Season over for the Vikings". ElliotLakeToday.com. Village Media. 31 December 2024.
- Russon, Randy (6 January 2025). "NOJHL goes to one division". saultthisweek.com. Postmedia.
- "Northern Ontario Junior A hockey swells with CIHL entry". CBC News. CBC/Radio-Canada. 7 July 2014.
- "NOJHL down to one division and down to 50 games for next year". nugget.ca. Postmedia. 12 June 2024.
- "New NOJHL season on the horizon". northernnews.ca. Postmedia. 10 September 2024.
- Heidman, Bruce (9 March 2017). "Longtime stats man Harrison honoured by NOJHL". thesudburystar.com. Postmedia.
- Seidel, Mark (27 December 2017). "Understanding the OHL scouting process". Sudbury Star. Postmedia.
- Leeson, Ben (22 March 2023). "Cubs' Ellis, Paper Kings' Signoretti among NOJHL's major award-winners". thesudburystar.com. Postmedia.
- "Rogers family comes through with $3M for Elliot Lake arena". Sudbury.com. 25 November 2024.
- Calverley, Stephen (18 December 2024). "Council looks at 'indefinitely postponing' Rogers Arena reopening". ElliotLakeToday.com. Village Media.
- Dillman, Martha (18 December 2024). "Elliot Lake arena may not re-open until the fall of 2025". CBC News. CBC/Radio-Canada.
- Dillman, Martha (19 December 2024). "Elliot Lake arena reopening delayed 'indefinitely,' with bill for ongoing repairs 'unknown'". CBC News. CBC/Radio-Canada.
- Calverley, Stephen (19 December 2024). "Combination of items delayed arena reopening, report". ElliotLakeToday.com. Village Media.
- Campbell, Ian (19 December 2024). "Elliot Lake council reacts to latest arena setback". CTV News Northern Ontario. Bell Media.
- Martin, Carol (20 December 2024). "Council officially delays reopening target for Rogers Arena". SooToday.com. Village Media.
- White Kirkpatrick, Camilla (24 December 2024). "Arena opening delayed until next season". elliotlakestandard.ca. Postmedia.
- Chorostil, Erika (30 May 2025). "Elliot Lake Vikings leave of absence extended for 2025–2026 season, amid arena repairs". CBC News. CBC/Radio-Canada.
- "Vikings remain sidelined for 2025–26 NOJHL season". ElliotLakeToday.com. Village Media. 30 May 2025.
- Russon, Randy (2 June 2025). "Elliot Lake Vikings stuck in limbo". saultthisweek.com. Postmedia.
- "New Hockey North Hall of Fame inducts first members". BayToday.ca. Village Media. 7 August 2025.
- "NOJHL releases rebranded logo". EUP News. SandMark Media, LLC. 19 August 2025.
- "NOJHL releases rebranded logo". nojhl.com (Press release). Northern Ontario Junior Hockey League. 18 August 2025.
- "Elliot Lake Vikings return to NOJHL as Rogers Arena nears reopening". ElliotLakeToday.com. Village Media. 19 March 2026.
- Russon, Randy (23 March 2026). "Elliot Lake Vikings will return to the NOJHL for '26–'27 season". saultthisweek.com. Postmedia.
- "Elliot Lake Vikings to return to NOJHL for 2026–27 season". CTV News. Bell Media. 23 March 2026.
- "Rare three-peat: Greater Sudbury Cubs claim third straight NOJHL crown". Sudbury.com. Village Media. 23 April 2026.
- Perry, Thomas (17 June 2026). "NOJHL action unlikely to return to Cochrane in 2026–27". cochranetimespost.ca. Postmedia.
- Leeson, Ben (18 July 2026). "NOJHL responds to Greater Sudbury Cubs' withdrawal from league". thesudburystar.com. Postmedia.
- "NOJHL announces 2026 Showcase schedule". nojhl.com. Northern Ontario Junior Hockey League. 10 September 2026.
- "NOJHL Team Previews: Elliot Lake Vikings". nojhl.com. Northern Ontario Junior Hockey League. 9 September 2026.
- Shanahan, Brendan. "Players first: An interim report of the ongoing review to strengthen men's junior hockey in Ontario" (PDF). hockeycanada.ca. Hockey Canada.
- "Final report on men's junior hockey in Ontario published". hockeycanada.ca. Hockey Canada.
- "Shanahan report makes 11 recommendations to improve Ontario junior hockey". Global News. Corus News. The Canadian Press. 25 September 2026.
