= Ringette in Canada =

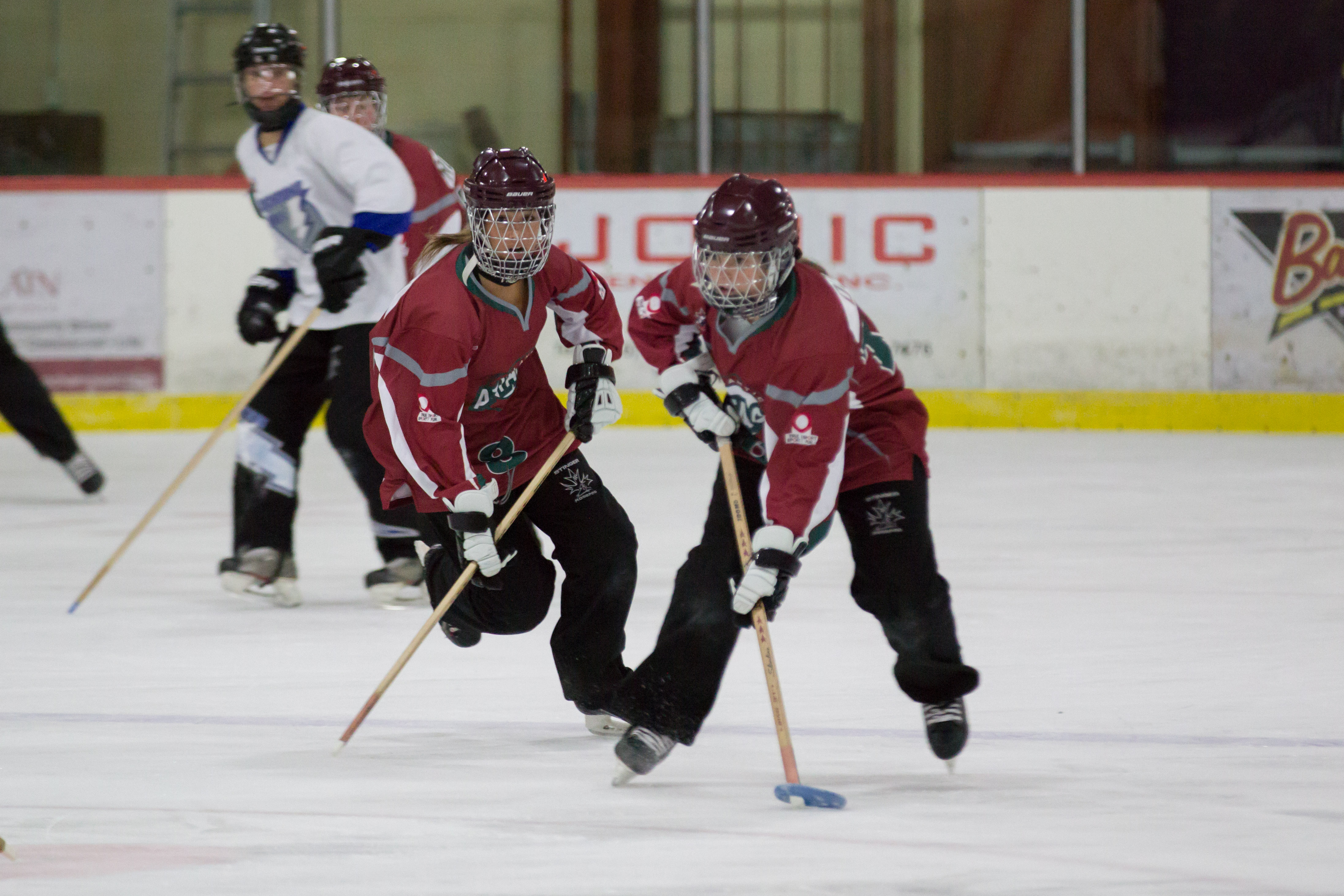
Ringette was created exclusively for girls in Canada in 1963.

Ringette in Canada began in 1963 when it was first conceptualized by Sam Jacks of North Bay, Ontario, in West Ferris. The sport of ringette is played in all 10 Canadian provinces and the Northwest Territories and involves an average of over 31,000 registered players every year. Canada is the location of ringette's origin where it is also recognized as a national heritage sport. The sport is governed nationally by Ringette Canada. Canadian provinces and territories have their own individual governing bodies in their respective jurisdictions.

In Canada, ringette serves as an important example of how girls and women can help take control of their own sports development rather than being treated as mere substitutes for, or an alternative to male-dominated sports, or as only important in their adjacency to male athletes who compete in the same sport. Ringette was created due to broomball and female ice hockey programs failing to attract the interest of girls and complaints that sports programs tended to be "too male-oriented".

The idea that ringette was developed as a result of girls and women being prohibited from playing ice hockey is a common but untrue myth that is widely spread by Canadian media, as well as by a number of sports organizations and people. However, it is an established fact that the first ringette team in history was a group of girls who played ice hockey in high school in Espanola, Ontario, Canada in 1963, and women began playing ice hockey in Canada in the late 1800s. By the 1800s, women were also playing bandy in a number of European nations, but the sport, which had its organized beginnings in England, did not successfully develop in North America and ultimately evolved into what is now known as ice hockey.

Ringette was created exclusively for girls rather than following the traditional approach whereby a separate female equivalent is developed from a sport already popular among the male population. The first basic rules were drafted by Sam Jacks, but its first official rules were drafted in Espanola, Ontario, by Mirl Arthur "Red" McCarthy between 1964 and 1965. The first ringette team in history was a group of Canadian girls from Espanola, Ontario who had played female high school ice hockey. The team experimented with the rules being developed by Mirl McCarthy and helped him further his goals by giving him feedback.

Ringette is played by Canadians from the youth level to the adult level with competition ranging from recreational to elite high performance competitions. In Canada players compete locally, provincially, nationally and internationally in European tournaments and the World Ringette Championships, as well as at the university and college level and the semi-professional level. Ringette is also a sport in the Canada Winter Games, a multi-sport competition for amateur Canadian athletes. 1979 marked the first time a Canadian ringette team traveled overseas to Europe (Finland).

== National governing body ==
The national governing body for the sport of ringette in Canada is Ringette Canada based in Ottawa, Ontario and is also responsible for the promotion the sport nationally. Ringette Canada is a member of the International Ringette Federation (IRF). Ringette Canada's national hall of fame, the Ringette Canada Hall of Fame, was established in 1988.

=== Ringette Canada Hall of Fame ===
Ringette Canada established the Ringette Canada Hall of Fame (RCHoF) in 1988. The RCHoF includes six categories: Founder, Builder, Official, Team, Coach, and Athlete. A number of Canadian national ringette teams have been inducted over the course of its existence, as well as players, builders, coaches, and officials.

== Provincial and territorial associations ==
Canada's provincial and territorial ringette associations are listed in the table below.

Association	Founded
Ringette Ontario	1969
Ringette Manitoba	1972
Ringuette Québec	1973
Ringette Nova Scotia	1974
BC Ringette	1976
Ringette Alberta	1976
Ringette Saskatchewan	1976
Ringette New Brunswick (Ringuette NB Ringette)	1981
Newfoundland and Labrador Ringette	1982
P.E.I. Ringette	1985
Northwest Territories Ringette	1986

== Competitive structure ==
Levels of competition in Canada are based on age group and skill, and range from recreational to competitive. Elite level competition includes university and college ringette, the National Ringette League, and the Canada national ringette team.

Levels of competition in Canadian ringette include: Recreational, C, B, BB, A, and AA and AAA, with AA being the highest level at which league competition occurs. AAA ringette is typically specific to particular regions who feel another category is necessary to clarify their league or tournament play. For example: AAA teams out of Quebec have played AA teams out of Alberta at various tournaments, including the Canadian Ringette Championships.

== Elite development ==
=== La Relève ===
La Relève is a development program in Canada's ringette community. It aims to identify and cultivate young talented players in the sport of ringette. La Relève provides additional training and mentorship opportunities for selected athletes who have shown potential at the U16 level.

The program typically includes regional and national camps where players receive specialized coaching and skill development sessions. It also provides exposure to high-level competition, allowing players to showcase their abilities and gain valuable experience.

La Relève in ringette is part of a broader effort to support the growth and advancement of the sport in Canada. It plays a critical role in identifying and nurturing talented young players, ultimately contributing to the development of the next generation of elite ringette athletes.

== National ringette teams ==
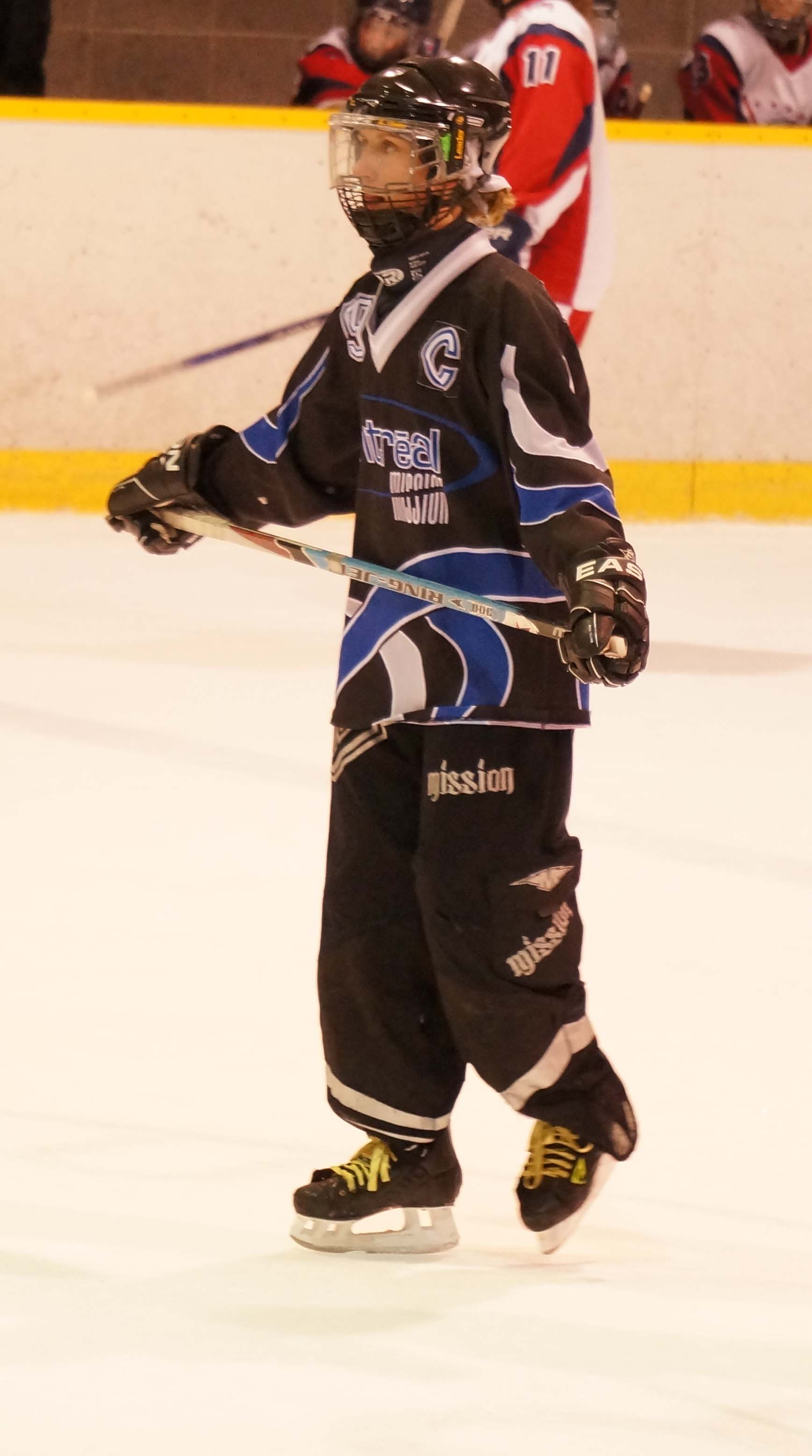
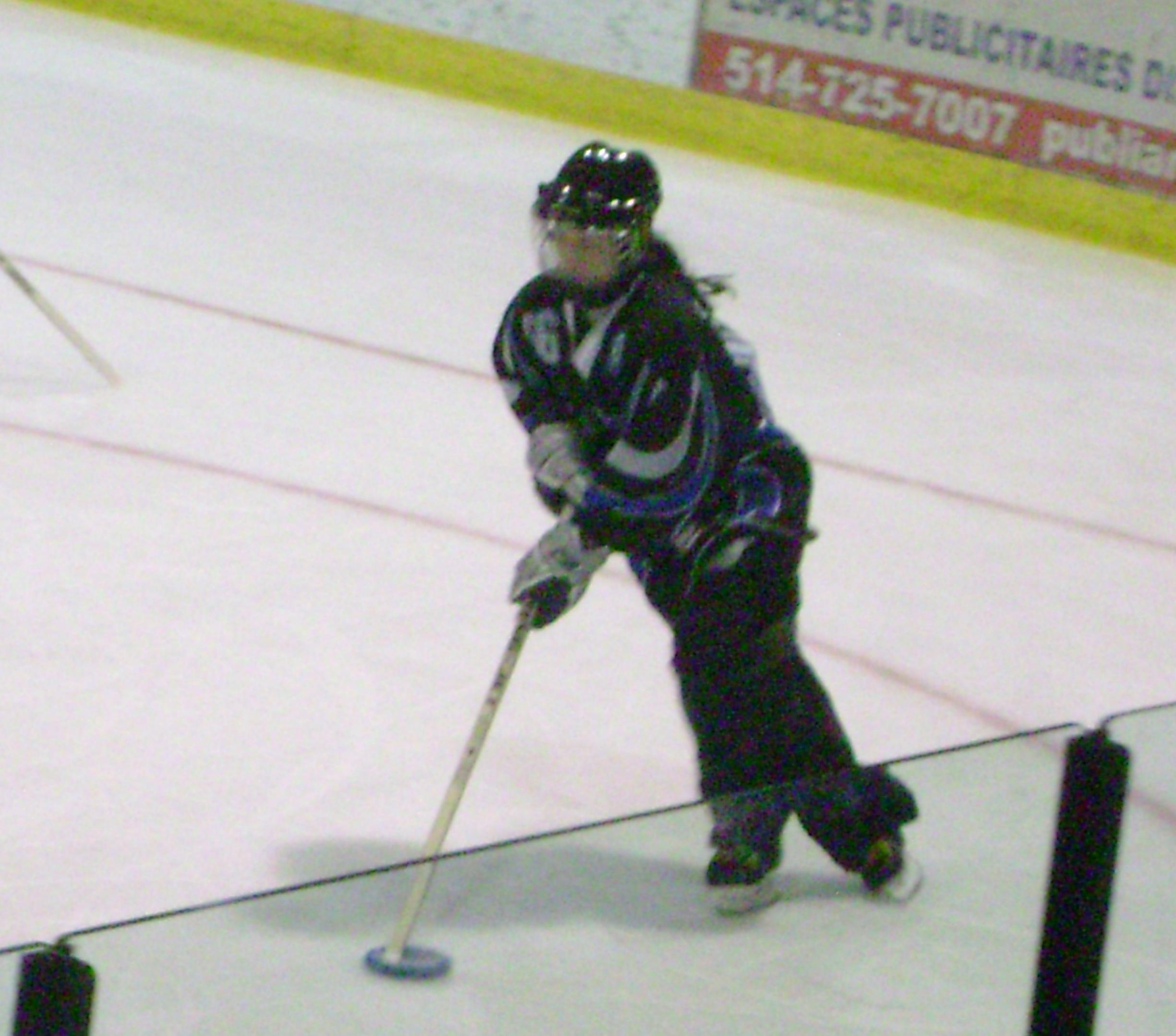
Former Canadian national ringette team players: Julie Blanchette (left) and Stéphanie Séguin (right)

Canada selects two national ringette teams for international competition: Team Canada Junior and Team Canada Senior. The roster for Team Canada's modern-day makeup for its senior national team includes athletes who either play or have played in Canada's semi-professional National Ringette League. Both teams compete in the World Ringette Championships (WRC).

The first all-Canadian national ringette consisted of adult and young adult ringette players and was established in 1996 and competed in the third World Ringette Championships, though Canada's first international appearance in ringette took place at the first World Ringette Championships in Gloucester, Ontario, at the 1990 World Ringette Championships. At the first World Ringette Championships, five teams from five separate Canadian provinces were represented: Alberta, Saskatchewan, Manitoba, Ontario, and Quebec. A sixth Canadian team, Team Gloucester, also competed having been selected to participate due to the fact that Gloucester served as the international tournaments host city. Canada has competed at every World Ringette Championships since, though a new division for junior players was eventually created in the early part of the 21st century beginning in 2009.

Canada's first all-Canadian junior national team was established for the 2013 World Ringette Championships. Previously, Canada's junior elite ringette players had competed in the World Junior Ringette Championships which first occurred in 2009 and then 2012 before the junior program was merged with the World Ringette Championships itself, resulting a new junior division. For the 2009 and 2012 world junior competitions, Canada sent two different junior teams to represent Canada at the world tournament, Team Canada East and Team Canada West.

== Semi-professional league ==
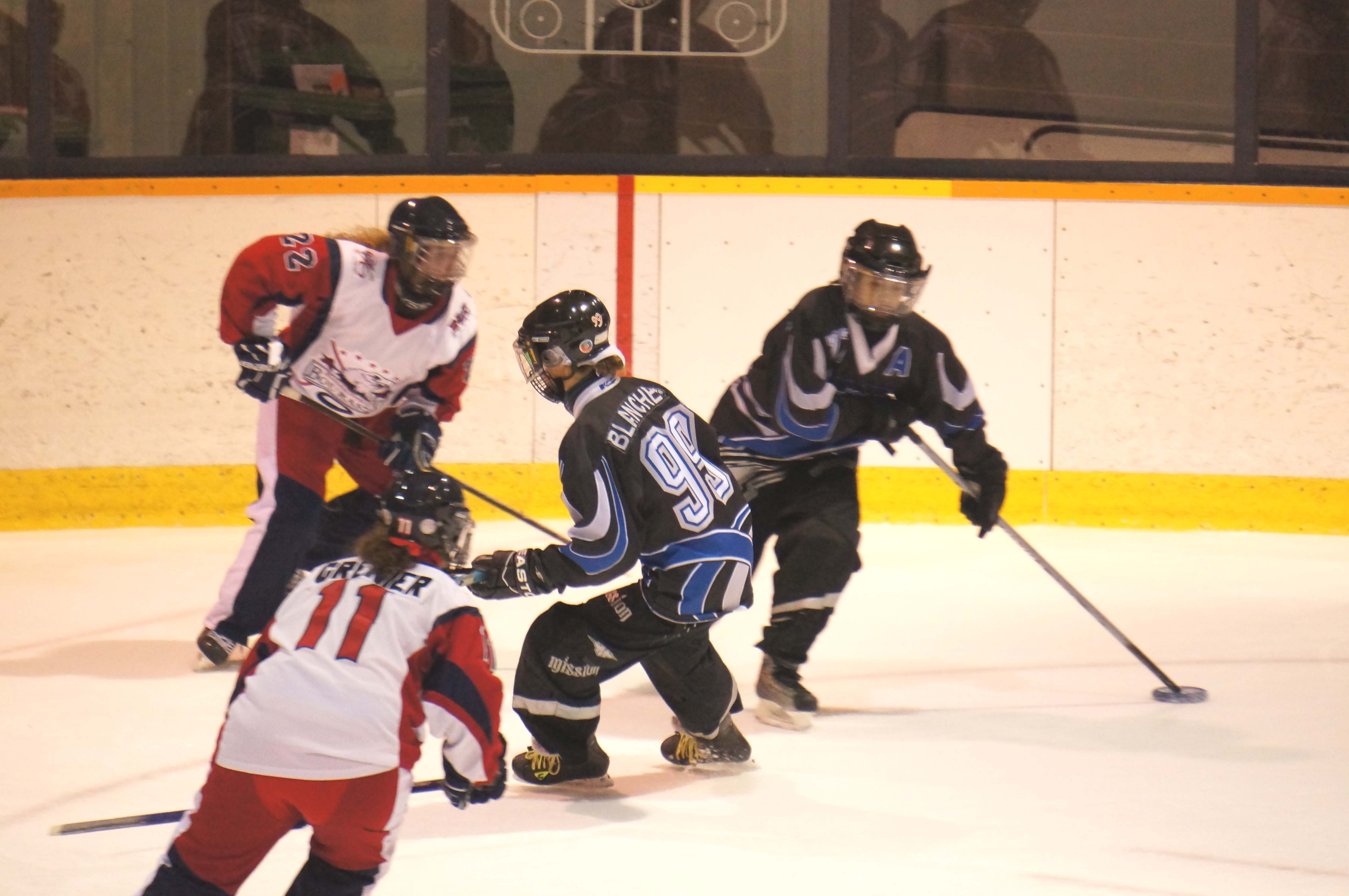
Bourassa Royal playing against the Montréal Mission during the 2011–12 NRL season

The National Ringette League (also indicated by the initials NRL) is Canada's premier, semi-professional showcase league for the sport of ringette and was introduced during the 2004–2005 ringette season. It is Canada's national league for elite ringette players aged 18+.

The final competition for the National Ringette League is held annually at the Canadian Ringette Championships. The winning team in the NRL division is awarded the Jeanne Sauvé Memorial Cup named after the late Governor General of Canada, Jeanne Sauvé. Initially coined the Jeanne Sauvé Cup and initiated in December 1984, it was first presented at the 1985 Canadian Ringette Championships in Dollard des Ormeaux, Québec. Now called the Jeanne Sauvé Memorial Cup the trophy is awarded to the best team in the National Ringette League. Canada's Rick Mercer visited the National Ringette League's Cambridge Turbos in 2009 to shoot an episode about ringette in Canada.

=== Teams ===
==== 2022–23 ====
In 2022–23, the league entered its 18th season with thirteen teams competing:

- BC Thunder
- Edmonton Black Gold Rush
- Edmonton WAM!
- Calgary RATH
- Saskatchewan Heat
- Manitoba Herd
- Nepean Ravens
- Waterloo Wildfire
- Cambridge Turbos
- Gatineau Fusion
- Montreal Mission
- Rive-Sud Révolution
- Atlantic Attack

== Registration levels ==
Ringette is played in all 10 Canadian provinces and the Northwest Territories and involves an average of 50,000 participants a year. In the 2017–18 Canadian ringette season, 31,168 players were registered to play ringette in Canada, the highest known participation rate for a season. Players participated on nearly 2,000 teams in eight age categories across the country. The largest increases were observed in New Brunswick and Nova Scotia, Alberta and Saskatchewan. The COVID-19 pandemic which began in 2019 had a negative impact on registration rates.

In Canada in 1979 there was an estimated 4,500 girls playing ringette across the country, but by 1983 (20 years after ringette was created) there were over 14,500, marking an increase in participation of roughly 10,000 Canadian girls. That same year the number of players registered in the female category of ice hockey in Canada, which was almost a century old, was a mere 5,379, less than 40% of ringette's numbers. A small decrease in the number of ringette athletes after 1998 has been attributed at least partially to women's ice hockey being recognized officially as an Olympic sport that same season, but is largely considered due to the decision by major governing body's for the women's hockey game to exclude body checking. Body checking was removed from the women's ice hockey program by the International Ice Hockey Federation after the 1990 IIHF Women's World Championship. Despite the inclusion of women's ice hockey in the Olympics, there remains a striking absence of recognition towards the fact that female players had historically employed body checking as an element of their game. After women's hockey's introduction to the Olympic Games, it quickly gained popularity; however, within a decade of its inaugural year in the Olympics, ringette saw a resurgence of registrations in Canada.

=== Brief decline and comeback ===
Between 1979 and 1983, roughly 10,000 new Canadian players registered to play ringette. Between 1985 and 1987 the sport continued to experience a notable increase in player registrations in Canada growing from roughly 20,000 registered players in 1985 to over 27,000 in 1987, a substantial increase within less than a five-year period. While the 1996–1997 ringette season saw a peak record of 27,058 registrations nationwide, a slight drop occurred in registration rates during the following season in 1997–98 whereby 25,951 players were recorded to have registered in Canada. However, rates began climbing again after the 2002–03 season and by the 2007–08 season, 27,197 players had registered, breaking the sport's highest recorded registration rate in Canada which had been set a decade before in 1996–97. By 2017–18 Canada recorded a record breaking 31,168 registered players, the highest number of players ever recorded in the nation's history.

=== Recorded registrations ===
The number of ringette registrations in Canada from 1979 to 2022 is as follows:

Year	Registrations
2022–2023	Unavailable
2021–2022	Unavailable
2020–2021	Unavailable
2019–2020	Unavailable
2018–2019	Unavailable
2017–2018	31,168
2016–2017	Unavailable
2015–2016	Unavailable
2014–2015	Unavailable
2013–2014	30,398
2012–2013	29,804
2011–2012	29,566
2010–2011	29,423
2009–2010	28,905
2008–2009	27,899
2007–2008	27,197
2006–2007	26,287
2005–2006	25,924
2004–2005	25,477
2003–2004	25,477
2002–2003	25,127
2001–2002	24,631
2000–2001	24,748
1999–2000	25,128
1998–1999	24,854
1997–1998	25,951
1996–1997	27,058
1995–1996	27,460
1995	Red McCarthy, ringette's co-inventor, dies
1994–1995	27,200
1993–1994	27,660
1992–1993	26,925
1991–1992	26,690
1990–1991	Unavailable
1989	over 28,000
1988	Unavailable
1987	over 27,000
1986	Unavailable
1985	20,000 barrier broken
1984	Unavailable
1983	over 14,500
1979	about 4,500
1975	Sam Jacks, ringette's inventor, dies
1969	The first ringette association in history is founded in Ontario, Canada. The Ontario Ringette Association (now Ringette Ontario) had 1,500 players in 14 communities and was founded with a government grant of $229.27.
1963–64	Ringette is invented by Sam Jacks with the help of Red McCarthy

== University and college ringette ==
Ringette players in Canada can play the sport at the university level and, in some provinces, at the college level as well. University teams mostly compete in the Open-A division and also participate in the University Challenge Cup (UCC), which is a nation-wide event.

The organizing body for the post-secondary level is known as the Canadian University & College Ringette Association, which is abbreviated "CUCRA". The organization was previously known by its initial name, "Canadian University Ringette" (CUR). CUCRA is not affiliated with U Sports, Canada's national governing body for university sport, or Ontario University Athletics (OUA) as of yet but aims to become so in the future.

Although U Sports does not recognize ringette, each institution has its own relationship to the ringette program connected to its particular campus. Some permit the ringette program to use the team nickname and use the varsity uniforms, while others have no affiliation with the ringette program at all.

The number of university ringette teams in Canada can vary from season to season, as teams may come and go due to factors such as funding, player recruitment, and other considerations. Tthese teams may change over time, and there may be additional universities that participate in local or regional tournaments and events. Due to the COVID-19 pandemic, several competitions for CUCRA's college and university ringette athletes were cancelled. Some teams did not reconvene post COVID-19.

The first tournament took place at the University of Winnipeg in 1999. Other Canadian universities previously known to have had teams include Lakehead University (Thunder Bay, Ontario), Mount Royal University (Calgary), Simon Fraser University (British Columbia), and the Université de Sherbrooke (Quebec).

=== Canadian university and college teams ===
Canadian University and College Ringette Teams
Ontario (12 teams)	Other
McMaster University (McMaster Marauders, Hamilton, Ontario)	Dalhousie University (Dalhousie Tigers, Nova Scotia)
University of Western Ontario (Western Mustangs, London, Ontario)	University of Calgary (Calgary Dinos, Calgary, Alberta)
Wilfrid Laurier University (Golden Hawks, Waterloo, Ontario, Brantford and Milton)	University of Lethbridge (Lethbridge Pronghorns, Alberta)
Guelph University (Guelph Gryphons, Guelph, Ontario)	University of Alberta and MacEwan University
Nipissing University (Nipissing Lakers, North Bay, Ontario)	Conestoga College (Kitchener, Ontario)
Brock University (Brock Badgers, St. Catharines, Ontario)	University of Manitoba (Manitoba Bisons, Fort Garry neighbourhood of southern Winnipeg)
Queen's University at Kingston (Queen's Gaels, Kingston, Ontario)	Holland College (Holland Hurricanes, Prince Edward Island)
Carleton University (Carleton Ravens, Ottawa, Ontario)	Saint Mary's University (Halifax) (Saint Mary's Huskies, Halifax, Nova Scotia)
Laurentian University (Laurentian Voyageurs, Greater Sudbury, Ontario)	Acadia University (Axewomen, Wolfville, Nova Scotia)
Trent University (Trent Excalibur, Peterborough, Ontario, with a satellite campus in Oshawa)	St. Francis Xavier University (X–Women, Antigonish, Nova Scotia)
University of Waterloo (Waterloo Warriors, Waterloo, Ontario)	
University of Ottawa (Ottawa Gee Gees, Ottawa, Ontario); The University of Ottawa ringette program was founded in 2004.

=== University Challenge Cup ===
The University Challenge Cup (UCC) is an annual competition in Canada which groups together ringette teams from various Canadian universities in two conferences and is organized by the Canadian University & College Ringette Association, (abbreviated "CUCRA"). The first competition took place at the University of Winnipeg in 1999. The competition typically involves in excess of 350 players, coaches, referees and tournament staff.

The University of Calgary, (Calgary Dinos in Calgary, Alberta) have won the most Tier 1 national titles to date since the UCC's inaugural year in 1999. Both the University of Western Ontario (Western Mustangs in London, Ontario) and McMaster University (McMaster Marauders in Hamilton, Ontario) are tied for the most titles won in Tier 2 competition, a division which was formed in 2009.

University Challenge Cup Champions
Canadian University Champions
Year	Host University	Tier 1	Tier 2
2022	Carleton University	(gold) Western Mustangs (University of Western Ontario)	(gold) Brock Badgers (Brock University)
2022	Carleton University	(silver) Guelph Gryphons (University of Guelph)	(silver) Carleton Ravens (Carleton University)
2022	Carleton University	(bronze) Lethbridge Pronghorns (University of Lethbridge)	(bronze) Nipissing Lakers (Nipissing University)
2021	Carleton University	cancelled due to COVID-19 pandemic	
2020	Wilfrid Laurier University	(gold) Brock Badgers (Brock University)	(gold) University N. Alberta
2019	Wilfrid Laurier University	(gold) Calgary Dinos (University of Calgary)	(gold) Dalhousie Tigers (Dalhousie University)
2018	University of Guelph	(gold) Calgary Dinos (University of Calgary)	(gold) Golden Hawks (Wilfrid Laurier University)
2017	University of Guelph	(gold) Ottawa Gee Gees (University of Ottawa)	(gold) McMaster Marauders (McMaster University)
2016	University of Calgary	(gold) Calgary Dinos (University of Calgary)	N/A
2015	University of Calgary	(gold) University N. Alberta	N/A
2014	Nipissing University	(gold) University N. Alberta	(gold) Guelph Gryphons (University of Guelph)
2013	Nipissing University	(gold) University of Alberta	(gold) McMaster Marauders (McMaster University)
2012	University of Western Ontario	(gold) University of Alberta	(gold) McMaster Marauders (McMaster University)
2011	University of Western Ontario	(gold) Calgary Dinos (University of Calgary)	(gold) Western Mustangs (University of Western Ontario)
2010	Brock University	(gold) Calgary Dinos (University of Calgary)	(gold) Western Mustangs (University of Western Ontario)
2009	Brock University	(gold) Calgary Dinos (University of Calgary)	(gold) Western Mustangs (University of Western Ontario)
2008	University of Ottawa	(gold) Calgary Dinos (University of Calgary)	N/A
2007	University of Ottawa	(gold) Calgary Dinos (University of Calgary)	N/A
2006	University of Manitoba	(gold) Ottawa Gee Gees (University of Ottawa)	N/A
2005	University of Manitoba	(gold) Calgary Dinos (University of Calgary)	N/A
2004	University of Winnipeg	(gold) Calgary Dinos (University of Calgary)	N/A
2003	College of Saint-Boniface	1st place, gold medalist(s)	N/A
2002	College of Saint-Boniface	1st place, gold medalist(s)	N/A
2001	University of Manitoba; Team A	1st place, gold medalist(s)	N/A
2000	College of Saint-Boniface	1st place, gold medalist(s)	N/A
1999	University of Winnipeg	(gold) Winnipeg Wesmen (University of Winnipeg)	N/A

=== Ontario University Ringette Provincials ===
In the province of Ontario, a university division is hosted by Ringette Ontario at the Ontario Provincial Ringette Championships where University ringette teams compete for the Dave Bennett University Cup. Some Ontario ringette tournaments also host University pools.

== National competitions ==
=== Canadian Ringette Championships ===
Canada's elite ringette players compete at the end of every ringette season in the Championnats Canadien d'Ringuette/Canadian Ringette Championships, commonly called "the Nationals", which also includes the final competition for the National Ringette League (NRL). The Canadian Ringette Championships, typically held each April, took place for the first time in 1979 in Winnipeg, Manitoba. This tournament was created to determine the Canadian champions in the categories of Under-16 years, Under-19 years and Open (replaced by the National Ringette League since 2008).

=== Canada Winter Games ===
While ringette was invented in 1963, the first Canada Games, a multi-sport event, was held four years later in 1967 in Quebec City. Ringette did not become a part of the Canada Winter Games programme until 1991. Former Ringette Canada President, Betty Shields, is considered to have been, "instrumental in ringette’s entry to the Canada Winter Games". The ringette program takes part during one of the two weeks of the Canada Winter Games. Competition usually begins on Mondays followed by the semi-final on Friday evening with the National final taking place on Saturdays. The best ringette athletes from 10 Canadian provinces are selected to compete on their representative provincial teams.

The Canada Winter Games are considered an important national event in Canada and is considered to be a key event in the development of Canada's young athletes. The competition involves the best young Canadian athletes competing in their age groups. The entire event is of two weeks in duration and is held every four years.

Canada Winter Games: Ringette Champions (1991–2019)
Year	Location	Gold	Silver	Bronze
2023	Prince Edward Island	Quebec	Alberta	Saskatchewan
2019	Red Deer, Alberta	Quebec	Ontario	Manitoba
2015	Prince George, British Columbia	Manitoba	Ontario	New Brunswick
2011	Halifax, Nova Scotia	Ontario	Alberta	Quebec
2007	Whitehorse, Yukon	Ontario	Alberta	Quebec
2003	Bathurst and Campbellton, New Brunswick	Ontario	Manitoba	British Columbia
1999	(Dominion of Newfoundland) Cornerbrook, Newfoundland	Ontario	Manitoba	Saskatchewan
1995	Grande Prairie, Alberta	Alberta	Manitoba	British Columbia
1991	Charlottetown, Prince Edward Island	Alberta	Ontario	British Columbia

== Provincial competitions ==
=== Provincial championships ===
Annual province-wide championship competitions are organized in a number of Canadian provinces for various skill levels and age groups.

=== Provincial Winter Games ===
In Canada a number of provinces organize province-wide, winter-based, multi-sport competitions either annually or biannually. These events are typically referred to as provincial "Winter Games". However, ringette is not included in every provincial winter games program and it depends on which province is involved.

Provincial Winter Games in Canada
Province	Event	Included/Year added	Winter Games inaugural year
British Columbia	BC Winter Games	Yes	1978; 48 years ago
Alberta	Alberta Winter Games	Yes	1974; 52 years ago
Saskatchewan	Saskatchewan Winter Games	No	1972; 54 years ago
Manitoba	Manitoba Winter Games	Yes	1974; 52 years ago
Ontario	Ontario Winter Games	Yes; 1976; 50 years ago	1970; 56 years ago
Quebec	Quebec Winter Games (French: 'Jeux du Québec')	Yes	1971; 55 years ago
New Brunswick	New Brunswick Winter Games		
Nova Scotia	Nova Scotia Winter Games		
Prince Edward Island	PEI Winter Games		
Newfoundland and Labrador	Newfoundland and Labrador Winter Games		

== Other competitions ==
Several Canadian cities and regions also have their own annual competitions.

=== Eastern Canadian Ringette Championships ===
The Eastern Canadian Ringette Championships (ECRC) is an annual competition organized strictly for ringette teams from the eastern part of Canada. The competition involves teams from Nova Scotia, Prince Edward Island, New Brunswick, Quebec and Ontario. The first event was held in 2002. Since 2002, teams from the participating provinces compete in the following four divisions: U14AA, U16A, U19A and 18+ A.

=== Western Canadian Ringette Championships ===
The Western Canadian Ringette Championships (WCRC) is an annual competition organized strictly for ringette teams from the western part of Canada, however, it is not organized by Ringette Canada. The tournament's inaugural year was in 2003. Typically held at the end of March, the competition involves teams from Manitoba, Saskatchewan, Alberta and British Columbia competing in U14, U16, U19 and 18+ divisions of competition.

Each of the four Western Canadian Provinces is eligible to send one provincial team to compete in each age division. The Host is able to enter a host team at U16, U19 and 18+ to create a five team division. U14 is a 10-team division made up of two teams from each province and two wildcard draws.

=== Largest Canadian tournament ===
The largest ringette tournament in Canada is the annual Esso Golden Ring Tournament in Calgary, Alberta which takes place in the month of January.

=== Nova Scotia ===
The City of Lakes Tournament (COLT) in Dartmouth, Nova Scotia, is the province's largest ringette tournament.

== Cross-sport participation ==
=== Bandy ===
Several of Canada's national level ringette players have also played bandy for the Canadian women's national bandy team. Both the women's and men's Canadian national bandy teams are based out of Winnipeg, Manitoba.

Several of Canada's women's national bandy players also played in the National Ringette League and on Canada's National Ringette Team. The bandy team has included top level ringette players like Ainsley Ferguson, Carrie Nash, Shelly Hruska, Amy Clarkson, and Lindsay Burns. Their best results are 4th at the 2007, 2010, 2012, and 2016 Women's Bandy World Championships. Canada's first goal scored in the nations history of organized women's bandy was by Lindsay Burns, a former member of Canada's national ringette team.

== Male players ==
In Canada male players are uncommon since numerous other winter team sports options for them exist such as ice hockey, bandy, and broomball. Boys are restricted to competing at the "B" level or lower in many ringette organizations since the sport is meant to highlight, cater to, and increase participation among females. Male players compete at the AA level in limited areas where the sport is played. Boys have participated in Under-9 (U9) or Under-6 (U6) divisions in some Canadian provinces. While ringette is mainly played by females, 700 male players are currently involved in the sport across the country.

== Olympic ringette team ==
Currently the sport of ringette is not recognized by the International Olympic Committee (IOC) and therefore is not a part of the Winter Olympic programme. The sport has a relatively narrow profile and is played predominately in four nations: Canada, Finland, Sweden, and the United States.

The International Olympic Committee has a rule that no new sport will be allowed into the Olympics unless it is organized for and played by both females and males at the international level.

Ringette is played predominantly by female athletes and the IOC has higher requirements for male participation. The charter stipulates that ringette be played extensively in seventy-five countries by men on four different continents and played by women in no less than forty countries and on three different continents. Outreach efforts by officials in Canada and Finland to have the sport recognized by the IOC have not been successful thus far.
