= List of British Columbia Government Agencies and Crown Corporations =

This is a list of crown corporations and agencies of the Government of British Columbia.

Crown corporations in BC are public-sector organizations established and funded by the Government of British Columbia to provide specialized goods and services to citizens. They operate at varying levels of government control, depending on how they are defined, funded, and the kinds of services they provide. In general, though they are technically owned by the government, they operate at arm's length from the public service and the elected officials of the government.

Individually, every public sector organization in BC is assigned a ministry that is responsible for the organization. That minister is the primary link between the B.C. government and the organization and is held accountable to the government for the performance of the organization. The Crown Agencies and Board Resourcing Office (CABRO) is responsible for supporting the governance of these organizations as a whole.

== Current organizations ==
The following is a list of current Crown agencies and corporations in British Columbia as of May 2021.

Organization	Responsible ministry	Area of concern
BC Arts Council	Tourism, Arts & Culture	grants for the arts
BC Assessment Authority (BC Assessment)	Municipal Affairs & Housing	property assessments
BC Council for International Education	Advanced Education, Skills & Training	internationalization of public, private, post-secondary, and language schools
BC Family Maintenance Agency (BCFMA)	Attorney General	child and spousal support
BC Games Society	Tourism, Arts & Culture	multi-sport games, including the BC Winter & BC Summer Games and national games
BC Housing Management Commission (BC Housing)	Municipal Affairs & Housing	subsidized housing in BC
BC Hydro and Power Authority (BC Hydro)	Energy, Mines & Petroleum Resources	generating, purchasing, distributing, and selling electricity
BC Infrastructure Benefits (BCIB)	Finance	implementing the community benefits agreement on select public infrastructure projects
BC Oil and Gas Commission	Energy, Mines & Petroleum Resources	regulation of oil and gas activities
BC Pavilion	Tourism, Arts & Culture	operation of BC Place and the Vancouver Convention Centre
BC Transit	Transportation & Infrastructure	public transportation across BC (excluding Metro Vancouver)
British Columbia Lottery Corporation	Finance	gambling
British Columbia Securities Commission	Finance	regulation of capital markets in BC
Columbia Basin Trust	Children & Family Development	management of B.C. assets of the Columbia Basin region
Columbia Power Corporation	Children & Family Development	hydropower projects in the Columbia Basin
Community Living BC	Social Development & Poverty Reduction	funding supports and services for adults with developmental disabilities and their families
Destination BC	Tourism, Arts & Culture	tourism marketing at the international, provincial, regional, and local levels
First Peoples' Cultural Council	Indigenous Relations & Reconciliation	revitalization of Indigenous language, arts, and culture in BC
Forest Enhancement Society of BC	Forests, Lands, Natural Resource Operations & Rural Development	environmental and resource stewardship of BC's forests
Forestry Innovation Investment	Jobs, Economic Recovery and Innovation	market development for forest products
InBC Investment Corp	Jobs, Economic Recovery and Innovation	management and investment of a $500-million strategic investment fund of the B.C. Government
Industry Training Authority	Advanced Education, Skills & Training	skilled trades system of BC
Innovate BC	Jobs, Economic Recovery and Innovation	advanced and innovative technologies for B.C. industries
Insurance Corporation of British Columbia	Public Safety and Solicitor General	universal auto insurance for B.C. motorists
Knowledge Network	Tourism, Arts & Culture	viewer-supported public broadcaster
Legal Services Society (Legal Aid BC)	Attorney General	legal information, advice, and representation services for people with low incomes
Partnerships BC	Finance	public sector–private sector partnership for infrastructure needs
Real Estate Council of BC (RECBC)	Finance	licensing individuals and brokerages engaged in real estate sales, or rental and strata property management
Royal BC Museum	Tourism, Arts & Culture	collection and preservation of items relating to the natural and human history of BC
Transportation Investment Corporation (TI Corp)	Transportation & Infrastructure	oversight, management, and delivery of major capital transportation projects

Though BC Liquor Distribution Branch is not a crown corporation, it is required to comply within the requirements of a Crown agency in relation to its financial reporting, service plan, and mandate letter. LBD operates under the B.C. Minister of Finance. The LBD owns BC Cannabis Stores and BC Liquor Stores.

Though it partners with the RCMP and municipal police, the Organized Crime Agency of British Columbia is a completely independent and designated police agency within BC, and is therefore not a crown corporation.

== Former organizations ==
- BC Immigrant Investment Fund
- BC Systems Corporation (1977-1996)
- BC Provincial Capital Commission
- BC Railway Company (Freight operations leased to CN Rail. BCR maintains ownership of all lands and operation of Roberts Bank subdivision (Deltaport))
- BC Transmission Corporation
- British Columbia Utilities Commission
- Community Social Services Employers' Association of BC
- Credit Union Deposit Guarantee Corporation
- Open Learning Agency
- Private Career Training Institutions Agency
- Trades Training Consortium of British Columbia

== See also ==
- Crown Corporations of Canada
