= Kelly Mann =

Kelly Mann may refer to:

- Kelly Mann (baseball) (born 1967), former baseball catcher
- Kelly Mann (special effects artist), film special effects practitioner and make-up artist
- Kelly Mann (sports administrator) (born 1958), BC Games Society President and CEO
