= Sean Harrison =

- Curler
- Born: September 14, 1985 (age 41); Ontario

Team
- Skip: Jonathan Beuk
- Third: Patrick Janssen
- Second: David Staples
- Lead: Sean Harrison

Curling career
- Member Association: Ontario
- Top CTRS ranking: 17th (2016–17)
Medal record
Mixed Curling
Representing Canada
World Mixed Championship
Gold medal – first place	2018 Kelowna

Sean Harrison (born September 14, 1985) is a Canadian curler from Newmarket, Ontario. He currently plays lead for the Jonathan Beuk rink. He is a former World Mixed Champion.

== Career ==
In juniors, Harrison joined up with Mike Anderson in 2001, and went on to win the 2002 Ontario Winter Games.

In men's curling, Harrison played lead for Chris Gardner from 2006 to 2010, for Anderson from 2010 to 2014, for Chris Wimmer from 2014 to 2015, for Dayna Deruelle from 2015 to 2018, for Wayne Tuck Jr. from 2018 to 2020, and for Mark Kean from 2020 to 2022. He played second for Michael Fournier from 2022 to 2024 and for Alex Champ from 2024 to 2025 before returning to lead for Jonathan Beuk for the 2025–26 season.

With Deruelle, the team played in the 2017 Canadian Olympic Pre-Trials, where they finished 3–3 in pool play, but lost in a tiebreaker. With Tuck, Harrison won the Brantford Nissan Classic World Curling Tour event in 2019.

Since 2009, Harrison has played in 10 provincial championships. With Gardner, he went 3–6 at the 2009 Ontario Tankard, and 1–9 in 2010. With Anderson, he went 6–4 in the round robin of the 2012 Ontario Tankard, and lost in the semifinal to Peter Corner. With Deruelle, he went 4–6 at the 2016 Ontario Tankard and 3–6 at the 2017 Ontario Tankard. He played lead for Joe Frans at the 2018 Ontario Tankard, where the team was eliminated in the C event after winning three games. With Kean, he was eliminated in the C event at the 2022 Ontario Tankard after winning just one game. With Fournier, he went 4–1 in pool play at the 2023 Ontario Tankard, but lost both games in the championship round. They returned to the Tankard in 2024, where they won three games before being eliminated in the C event. With Champ, he again won three games before losing in the C event at the 2025 Ontario Tankard.

=== Mixed ===
Harrison has found the most success in mixed curling. For the 2018–19 curling season, he played second on the Mike Anderson mixed rink, along with Danielle Inglis at third, and wife Lauren at lead. After the team won the Ontario mixed championship, they represented Canada at the 2018 Canadian Mixed Curling Championship. There, the team went 5–1 in pool play, before beating New Brunswick and Quebec in the playoffs to claim the national championship. From there, they went on to represent Canada at the 2018 World Mixed Curling Championship. In pool play, the team finished with a 6–1 record, before winning all four of their playoff games, including beating Spain in the final to claim the gold medal. It was the first gold medal for Canada since the event began in 2015.

== Personal life ==
Harrison is a graduate of Seneca College. He married his mixed teammate Lauren in 2016. At their wedding, Danielle Inglis was a bridesmaid, and Mike Anderson was a groomsman. Harrison's father, Neil, was a two-time World men's champion.
