= Mike Anderson (curler) =

Canadian curler from Toronto

- Curler
- Born: February 4, 1985 (age 41); Markham, Ontario, Canada

Team
- Curling club: Richmond Hill CC; Richmond Hill, ON
- Skip: Rylan Hartley
- Third: Mike Anderson
- Second: Chris Gardner
- Lead: Zander Elmes
- Alternate: Austin Snyder

Curling career
- Member Association: Ontario
- Top CTRS ranking: 25th (2014–15)
Medal record
Curling
Representing Canada
World Mixed Curling Championship
Gold medal – first place	Kelowna 2018

Michael Anderson (born February 4, 1985) is a Canadian curler from Markham, Ontario. He is a Canadian University champion.

== Career ==
Anderson is most notable for leading the Laurier Golden Hawks men's curling team to a national university championship in 2008. This qualified the rink to represent Canada at the 2009 Winter Universiade. The team finished in 6th place, with a 4–5 record.

Anderson also won the provincial Junior Mixed championship in 2006.

As of 2012, Anderson has played in three World Curling Tour events, and has yet to win a tournament.

Anderson played in his third provincial men's championship after qualifying for the 2016 Ontario Tankard. His first was in 2010, when he played lead for Joe Frans. His second was in 2012 Dominion Tankard when he skipped.

Anderson won the 2018 Canadian Mixed Curling Championship in Swan River, Manitoba, skipping his team out of the Thornhill Club, in November 2017. His rink went on to win the 2018 World Mixed Curling Championship.

== Teammates ==
Men's (Toronto Cricket, Skating & Curling Club)

- Mike Harris (Skip)
- Scott Hodgson (second)
- Scott Foster (lead)

Mixed (The Thornhill Club)

- Danielle Inglis (Third)
- Sean Harrison (second)
- Lauren Harrison (lead)
