= Western Canada Summer Games =

Multi-sport event

- Athletes from 3 western provinces: Alberta, Saskatchewan, Manitoba, and the 3 territories: Yukon, Northwest Territories, and Nunavut, compete in the WCSG
- Status: Active
- Genre: Multi-sport event
- Frequency: Quadrennial (bi-sects the Canada Summer Games)
- Location: Various
- Country: Canada
- Inaugurated: 1975; 51 years ago

The Western Canada Summer Games (WCSG) were established in 1975 as a multi-sport event to provide development opportunities for amateur athletes and to help them advance their skills in a competitive, but friendly environment. Athletes range in age between 13 years of age and 23 years of age.

The games also serve to broaden the exposure of talented athletes and provide a training ground for national and international level competitions. Social and cultural elements round out the sporting events for athletes. The competitors for the WCSG consist of athletes from three Western Provinces Alberta, Saskatchewan, and Manitoba, and the three Territories (Yukon, Northwest Territories, and Nunavut).

== History ==
Over several decades in all areas of Western Canada there had been a remarkable hosting of sports competitions of all kinds held under a wide variety of authorities. These had been local and area competitions, regional and provincial games, some featuring many sports, some held in the winter season, some in the summer, and some staged indoors with others, outdoors. Some of the competitions had varied in recognition and sanctions from national sport governing bodies while others didn't. Most of the competitions had age restrictions and/or scholastic or geographic restrictions of some kind. As a result, people concerned closely with the development of athletes and sport started to take a long critical look at what was going on in Western Canada.

This concern led one provincial government to engage in one-on-one talks with its sport federations which then led to larger group talks, then formal meetings and conferences that viewed, reviewed and overviewed the total situation. The final conclusion was that the existing sport competitions were not developing athletes of national and international calibre and were not providing adequate outlets for greater recognition of many sports and their athletes. That conclusion was not a criticism of the benefits of existing sports programs but recognition that athletes were not progressing along the continuum to achieve national and international results.

The various provincial games of 1972 combined to form the idea of staging major multi-sport games event in Western Canada based on the highly demanding rules and regulations of international Games, which would attract the greatest number of Western Canadian athletes for open competition. By 1973, the final refined idea was a major program that would provide Western Canadian athletes with an opportunity to train for and participate in high standard competition as well as create an interest in some lesser-known sports on the part of younger athletes.

The Western Canada Summer Games were officially launched in Regina, Saskatchewan in August 1975, in a pre-Olympic Games year along with the decision to hold the Games every four years, one year ahead of the Olympic Games, and using the same 23 summer sports disciplines. In 1983, the Yukon and Northwest Territories applied for membership to the Games and debuted with a total of 23 athletes between the two territories.

Following the 1987 Western Canada Summer Games, a review of the Games was conducted and it was agreed that the purpose of the games should be to provide developing athletes with an opportunity to compete in competitions that support provincial or territorial plans and which might lead to greater competitions at the national level (i.e. Canada Games, National Championships, etc.).

The 1990 Western Canada Summer Games held in Winnipeg, Manitoba, saw provincial and territorial team sizes grow to in excess of 700 athletes and coaches participating in 31 sports with the focus shifting from the original pre Olympic showcase of the "Best in the West", to a more broad approach that allowed each individual sport to determine an age group for their sport. This approach proved to be beyond the financial capacities of the provinces/territories to sustain and the mix of categories was deemed difficult for hosts to market and for provinces/territories to rationalize their involvement.

At the 1995 Games in Abbotsford, B.C., team sizes were reduced to approximately 500 athletes and coaches participating in 23 sports with many of them focusing on developmental age groups. During the Ministers meeting in 1995, direction was given to the Western Canada Games Council by the Ministers to further reduce the teams to a limit of 400 participants and to determine a "fit" for the Games. Alberta and Yukon withdrew from the Western Canada Games following the 1995 Games due to lack of clear fit for the Games. The Northwest Territories increased the size of their team and brought a record 152 athletes to participate.

By the 1999 Games in Prince Albert, Saskatchewan, team sizes had been reduced to approximately 400 and more sports were fitting into the model of developing athlete's age of eligibility for the next Canada Games (especially in the case of Canada Summer Games team sports). For these reasons, Alberta agreed and was reinstated in the Games. The Yukon Territory was also welcomed back to the Games family.

In June 2003, Nunavut debuted as the third Territory to participate, and brought the total membership of the Western Canada Summer Games to 7 jurisdictions.

The current rationale for the Western Canada Summer Games is to bi-sect the Canada Summer Games cycle (the Technical Packages are aligned two years younger than the Canada Summer Games ages where possible) and provides an opportunity for top age-class athletes to test their athletic talent against the best in the west.

On April 15, 2016, the Province of British Columbia withdrew Team BC from the Western Canada Summer Games, including the upcoming 2019 Games in Swift Current, Saskatchewan, citing fiscal constraints and the return on investment by funding a provincial team to these specific games.

Until further notice, the Western Canada Summer Games program has been suspended.

== Sports ==
The following is a list of 37 sports that have been a part of a Western Canada Summer Games event:

Western Canada Summer Games
Sports
Archery (M, W)	Equestrian (M, W)	Athletics (Track and Field⁣) (M, W, WC, SO)	Badminton (M, W)
Baseball⁣ (M)	Basketball⁣ (M, W)	Boxing (M)	Canoeing (M, W)
Cycling (M, W)	Diving (M, W)	Artistic Gymnastics (M, W)	Field hockey (M, W)
Handgun (Open)	Judo (M, W)	Rhythmic Gymnastics (M, W)	Rifle (Open)
Rowing (M, W)	Rugby (M/W)	Sailing⁣ (M, W)	Soccer⁣ (M, W)
Softball (M, W)	Squash (M, W)	Synchronized Swimming (W)	Swimming (M, W)
Table tennis (M, W)	Tennis (M, W)	Team handball (M, W)	Trap shooting (Open)
Triathlon (M, W)	Skeet shooting (Open)	Volleyball (M, W)	Water polo (M, W)
Wrestling (M, W)	Weightlifting (M/W)	Water skiing (M, W)	Golf
		Beach volleyball	Fencing (M,W)

== Events by year ==
=== 2011 Western Canada Summer Games ===
The Kamloops, British Columbia 2011 Western Canada Summer Games were held August 5–14, 2011 in Kamloops B.C. and included two phases.

==== Phased events ====
2011 Western Canada Summer Games
Phased events
Phase 1 events	Phase 2 events
Athletics	Badminton
Baseball	Cycling
Basketball	Field hockey
Beach volleyball	Golf
Canoeing/Kayaking	Gymnastics
Softball	Rowing
Tennis	Rugby
Triathlon	Soccer
Wrestling	Swimming
	Volleyball

== Quick facts ==
- Stage of Athlete: Train to Train - technical packages are aligned two years younger than Canada Summer Games
- Age Range: 13 – 23
- Frequency: Quadrennial (bi-sects the Canada Summer Games)
- Athlete Numbers: 2,300 total (425 maximum team size)
- Coaching Numbers: 400 total (team size is 69)
- Coaching Certification: NCCP Level 3 or equivalent under the new NCCP for the head coach
- Sports: 19
- Volunteers Required: 3,000
- Technical Officials: 300
- Days of Competition: 10

== Hosts ==
Year	Host Community	Notes
1975	Regina, Saskatchewan	
1979	Saskatoon, Saskatchewan	
1983	Calgary, Alberta	
1987	Regina, Saskatchewan	
1991	Winnipeg, Manitoba	
1995	Abbotsford, British Columbia	
1999	Prince Albert, Saskatchewan	
2003	Selkirk, Manitoba; Stonewall, Manitoba; Gimli, Manitoba; Beausejour, Manitoba	
2007	Strathcona County, Alberta	
2011	Kamloops, British Columbia	
2015	Wood Buffalo, Alberta	
2019	Swift Current, Saskatchewan (Note: This hosting rotation has been approved by the Ministers)	2019wcsg.ca

== Medal count ==
This is the medal count from the 2007 Western Canada Summer Games

Rank	Province	Gold	Silver	Bronze	Total
1	British Columbia	86	64	47	197
2	Alberta	61	57	68	186
3	Saskatchewan	38	54	49	141
4	Manitoba	28	36	42	106
5	Yukon	0	2	4	6
6	Nunavut	0	0	1	1
7	Northwest Territories	0	0	0	0

== See also ==
- Canada Games
  - Canada Summer Games
  - Canada Winter Games
- Quebec Games
- BC Games
- BC Summer Games
- BC Winter Games
- Alberta Winter Games
- Saskatchewan Games
- Manitoba Games
- Ontario Games
