= 2018 Canadian Mixed Curling Championship =

- Host city: Swan River, Manitoba
- Arena: Swan River Curling Club
- Dates: November 12–18, 2017
- Winner: Ontario
- Curling club: The Thornhill Club, Thornhill
- Skip: Mike Anderson
- Third: Danielle Inglis
- Second: Sean Harrison
- Lead: Lauren Harrison
- Finalist: Quebec (Robert Desjardins)

The 2018 Canadian Mixed Curling Championship was held from November 12 to 18, 2017 at the Swan River Curling Club in Swan River, Manitoba. The championship was won by the team from Ontario, who went on to represent Canada at the 2018 World Mixed Curling Championship.

== Teams ==
The teams are listed as follows:

| Team | Skip | Third | Second | Lead | Locale |
|---|---|---|---|---|---|
| Alberta | Warren Cross | Katie Morrissey | Dean Darwent | Heather Steele | Avonair Curling Club, Edmonton |
| British Columbia | Tom Buchy | Lori Buchy | Dave Toffolo | Robyn Toffolo | Kimberley Curling Club, Kimberley |
| Manitoba | Dean Dunstone | Natalie Claude Harding | Peter Nicholls | Renee Fletcher | East St. Paul Curling Club, East St. Paul |
| New Brunswick | Charlie Sullivan | Leah Thompson | Paul Nason | Erica Cluff | Thistle St. Andrews Curling Club, Saint John |
| Newfoundland and Labrador | Chris Ford | Brooke Godsland | Zach Young | Kate Murphy | RE/MAX Centre, St. John's |
| Northern Ontario | Charlie Robert | Alissa Begin | Dan Mick | Tracy Auld | Community First Curling Centre, Sault Ste. Marie |
| Northwest Territories | Jamie Koe | Kerry Galusha | Brad Chorostkowski | Megan Koehler | Yellowknife Curling Club, Yellowknife |
| Nova Scotia | Brent MacDougall | Christina Black | Graham Breckon | Jennifer Crouse | Dartmouth Curling Club, Dartmouth |
| Nunavut | Ed MacDonald | Denise Hutchings | Gregory Howard | Sadie Pinksen | Iqaluit Curling Club, Iqaluit |
| Ontario | Mike Anderson | Danielle Inglis | Sean Harrison | Lauren Harrison | The Thornhill Club, Thornhill |
| Prince Edward Island | Dennis Watts | Jaclyn Reid | Erik Brodersen | Alison Griffin | Charlottetown Curling Complex, Charlottetown; Western Community Curling Club, Alberton |
| Quebec | Robert Desjardins | Amélie Blais | Thierry Fournier | Veronique Bouchard | Club de curling Chicoutimi, Chicoutimi; Club de curling Etchemin, Saint-Romuald |
| Saskatchewan | Bruce Korte | Brett Barber | Jayden Shwaga | Robyn Despins | Prince Albert Golf & Curling Club, Prince Albert |
| Yukon | Robert Smallwood | Sarah Koltun | Alex Peech | Jody Smallwood | Whitehorse Curling Club, Whitehorse |

== Round robin ==
=== Standings ===
Final round-robin standings

Key
| Teams to Championship Pool |

| Pool A | Skip | W | L |
|---|---|---|---|
| Quebec | Robert Desjardins | 6 | 0 |
| Newfoundland and Labrador | Chris Ford | 4 | 2 |
| Northwest Territories | Jamie Koe | 4 | 2 |
| Alberta | Warren Cross | 3 | 3 |
| Saskatchewan | Bruce Korte | 3 | 3 |
| Manitoba | Dean Dunstone | 1 | 5 |
| Nunavut | Ed MacDonald | 0 | 6 |

| Pool B | Skip | W | L |
|---|---|---|---|
| Ontario | Mike Anderson | 5 | 1 |
| New Brunswick | Charlie Sullivan | 5 | 1 |
| Nova Scotia | Brent MacDougall | 4 | 2 |
| Northern Ontario | Charlie Robert | 3 | 3 |
| British Columbia | Tom Buchy | 3 | 3 |
| Yukon | Robert Smallwood | 1 | 5 |
| Prince Edward Island | Dennis Watts | 0 | 6 |

=== Scores ===
==== Draw 1 ====
Sunday November 12, 7:00pm

| Sheet B | 1 | 2 | 3 | 4 | 5 | 6 | 7 | 8 | Final |
| Alberta (Cross) | 0 | 4 | 0 | 1 | 0 | 3 | 0 | X | 8 |
| Saskatchewan (Korte) | 1 | 0 | 2 | 0 | 1 | 0 | 0 | X | 4 |

| Sheet C | 1 | 2 | 3 | 4 | 5 | 6 | 7 | 8 | Final |
| Quebec (Desjardins) | 0 | 2 | 0 | 0 | 3 | 1 | 0 | X | 6 |
| Manitoba (Dunstone) | 0 | 0 | 0 | 1 | 0 | 0 | 1 | X | 2 |

| Sheet D | 1 | 2 | 3 | 4 | 5 | 6 | 7 | 8 | Final |
| British Columbia (Buchy) | 0 | 0 | 0 | 0 | 1 | 0 | X | X | 1 |
| Northern Ontario (Robert) | 1 | 2 | 4 | 2 | 0 | 3 | X | X | 12 |

| Sheet E | 1 | 2 | 3 | 4 | 5 | 6 | 7 | 8 | 9 | Final |
| Nova Scotia (MacDougall) | 1 | 0 | 1 | 0 | 2 | 0 | 1 | 0 | 0 | 5 |
| New Brunswick (Sullivan) | 0 | 1 | 0 | 1 | 0 | 2 | 0 | 1 | 3 | 8 |

==== Draw 2 ====
Monday November 13, 2:30pm

| Sheet A | 1 | 2 | 3 | 4 | 5 | 6 | 7 | 8 | Final |
| Newfoundland and Labrador (Ford) | 0 | 0 | 0 | 1 | 0 | 0 | 1 | 1 | 3 |
| Quebec (Desjardins) | 0 | 1 | 2 | 0 | 1 | 0 | 0 | 0 | 4 |

| Sheet B | 1 | 2 | 3 | 4 | 5 | 6 | 7 | 8 | Final |
| Yukon (Smallwood) | 0 | 1 | 1 | 0 | 1 | 0 | 0 | 0 | 3 |
| Ontario (Anderson) | 0 | 0 | 0 | 1 | 0 | 1 | 1 | 1 | 4 |

| Sheet C | 1 | 2 | 3 | 4 | 5 | 6 | 7 | 8 | Final |
| Northwest Territories (Koe) | 0 | 0 | 2 | 1 | 0 | 4 | 0 | X | 7 |
| Saskatchewan (Korte) | 0 | 2 | 0 | 0 | 1 | 0 | 1 | X | 4 |

| Sheet D | 1 | 2 | 3 | 4 | 5 | 6 | 7 | 8 | Final |
| Nunavut (MacDonald) | 0 | 1 | 0 | 0 | 0 | 1 | X | X | 2 |
| Manitoba (Dunstone) | 3 | 0 | 3 | 3 | 1 | 0 | X | X | 10 |

| Sheet E | 1 | 2 | 3 | 4 | 5 | 6 | 7 | 8 | Final |
| Prince Edward Island (Watts) | 0 | 2 | 1 | 0 | 0 | 2 | 0 | X | 5 |
| Northern Ontario (Robert) | 1 | 0 | 0 | 1 | 2 | 0 | 3 | X | 7 |

==== Draw 3 ====
Monday November 13, 7:00pm

| Sheet A | 1 | 2 | 3 | 4 | 5 | 6 | 7 | 8 | 9 | Final |
| Northwest Territories (Koe) | 0 | 2 | 1 | 0 | 0 | 2 | 0 | 0 | 1 | 6 |
| Alberta (Cross) | 2 | 0 | 0 | 1 | 0 | 0 | 0 | 2 | 0 | 5 |

| Sheet B | 1 | 2 | 3 | 4 | 5 | 6 | 7 | 8 | Final |
| Newfoundland and Labrador (Ford) | 2 | 1 | 1 | 2 | 1 | 2 | X | X | 9 |
| Nunavut (MacDonald) | 0 | 0 | 0 | 0 | 0 | 0 | X | X | 0 |

| Sheet C | 1 | 2 | 3 | 4 | 5 | 6 | 7 | 8 | Final |
| Yukon (Smallwood) | 2 | 0 | 0 | 0 | 1 | 2 | 0 | 0 | 5 |
| Nova Scotia (MacDougall) | 0 | 2 | 0 | 4 | 0 | 0 | 1 | 4 | 11 |

| Sheet D | 1 | 2 | 3 | 4 | 5 | 6 | 7 | 8 | 9 | Final |
| New Brunswick (Sullivan) | 0 | 1 | 1 | 0 | 0 | 0 | 1 | 1 | 1 | 5 |
| Prince Edward Island (Watts) | 0 | 0 | 0 | 1 | 1 | 2 | 0 | 0 | 0 | 4 |

| Sheet E | 1 | 2 | 3 | 4 | 5 | 6 | 7 | 8 | Final |
| Ontario (Anderson) | 0 | 0 | 3 | 0 | 0 | 0 | 1 | 0 | 4 |
| British Columbia (Buchy) | 0 | 1 | 0 | 1 | 1 | 0 | 0 | 2 | 5 |

==== Draw 4 ====
Tuesday November 14, 10:00am

| Sheet A | 1 | 2 | 3 | 4 | 5 | 6 | 7 | 8 | Final |
| Prince Edward Island (Watts) | 1 | 2 | 0 | 0 | 1 | 2 | 0 | X | 6 |
| Yukon (Smallwood) | 0 | 0 | 3 | 3 | 0 | 0 | 2 | X | 8 |

| Sheet B | 1 | 2 | 3 | 4 | 5 | 6 | 7 | 8 | Final |
| Manitoba (Dunstone) | 0 | 1 | 0 | 0 | 1 | 3 | 0 | X | 5 |
| Northwest Territories (Koe) | 2 | 0 | 1 | 2 | 0 | 0 | 4 | X | 9 |

| Sheet C | 1 | 2 | 3 | 4 | 5 | 6 | 7 | 8 | 9 | Final |
| Alberta (Cross) | 0 | 1 | 0 | 0 | 2 | 0 | 0 | 1 | 0 | 4 |
| Newfoundland and Labrador (Ford) | 0 | 0 | 2 | 1 | 0 | 1 | 0 | 0 | 3 | 7 |

| Sheet E | 1 | 2 | 3 | 4 | 5 | 6 | 7 | 8 | Final |
| Nunavut (MacDonald) | 1 | 0 | 1 | 0 | 1 | 0 | 0 | X | 3 |
| Quebec (Desjardins) | 0 | 3 | 0 | 2 | 0 | 0 | 3 | X | 8 |

==== Draw 5 ====
Tuesday November 14, 2:30pm

| Sheet A | 1 | 2 | 3 | 4 | 5 | 6 | 7 | 8 | Final |
| Northern Ontario (Robert) | 0 | 1 | 0 | 0 | 1 | 0 | X | X | 2 |
| New Brunswick (Sullivan) | 2 | 0 | 1 | 2 | 0 | 3 | X | X | 8 |

| Sheet B | 1 | 2 | 3 | 4 | 5 | 6 | 7 | 8 | Final |
| Quebec (Desjardins) | 0 | 1 | 0 | 1 | 1 | 2 | 0 | X | 5 |
| Alberta (Cross) | 1 | 0 | 2 | 0 | 0 | 0 | 0 | X | 3 |

| Sheet C | 1 | 2 | 3 | 4 | 5 | 6 | 7 | 8 | Final |
| British Columbia (Buchy) | 2 | 2 | 0 | 0 | 5 | 0 | X | X | 9 |
| Prince Edward Island (Watts) | 0 | 0 | 1 | 0 | 0 | 1 | X | X | 2 |

| Sheet D | 1 | 2 | 3 | 4 | 5 | 6 | 7 | 8 | Final |
| Nova Scotia (MacDougall) | 0 | 0 | 0 | 1 | 1 | 0 | 1 | X | 3 |
| Ontario (Anderson) | 2 | 2 | 1 | 0 | 0 | 2 | 0 | X | 7 |

| Sheet E | 1 | 2 | 3 | 4 | 5 | 6 | 7 | 8 | Final |
| Saskatchewan (Korte) | 2 | 2 | 0 | 2 | 0 | 2 | 0 | X | 8 |
| Manitoba (Dunstone) | 0 | 0 | 1 | 0 | 1 | 0 | 1 | X | 3 |

==== Draw 6 ====
Tuesday November 14, 7:00pm

| Sheet A | 1 | 2 | 3 | 4 | 5 | 6 | 7 | 8 | Final |
| Nova Scotia (MacDougall) | 0 | 2 | 0 | 2 | 0 | 1 | 1 | X | 6 |
| British Columbia (Buchy) | 2 | 0 | 1 | 0 | 1 | 0 | 0 | X | 4 |

| Sheet B | 1 | 2 | 3 | 4 | 5 | 6 | 7 | 8 | Final |
| Ontario (Anderson) | 1 | 0 | 2 | 1 | 1 | 2 | 0 | X | 7 |
| Northern Ontario (Robert) | 0 | 1 | 0 | 0 | 0 | 0 | 2 | X | 3 |

| Sheet C | 1 | 2 | 3 | 4 | 5 | 6 | 7 | 8 | Final |
| Nunavut (MacDonald) | 0 | 0 | 1 | 0 | 1 | 0 | 0 | X | 2 |
| Northwest Territories (Koe) | 0 | 4 | 0 | 1 | 0 | 0 | 3 | X | 8 |

| Sheet D | 1 | 2 | 3 | 4 | 5 | 6 | 7 | 8 | Final |
| Newfoundland and Labrador (Ford) | 0 | 1 | 0 | 1 | 0 | 0 | 1 | X | 3 |
| Saskatchewan (Korte) | 2 | 0 | 1 | 0 | 3 | 2 | 0 | X | 8 |

| Sheet E | 1 | 2 | 3 | 4 | 5 | 6 | 7 | 8 | Final |
| New Brunswick (Sullivan) | 0 | 0 | 0 | 2 | 0 | 1 | 0 | 2 | 5 |
| Yukon (Smallwood) | 1 | 0 | 1 | 0 | 1 | 0 | 1 | 0 | 4 |

==== Draw 7 ====
Wednesday November 15, 10:00am

| Sheet A | 1 | 2 | 3 | 4 | 5 | 6 | 7 | 8 | Final |
| Saskatchewan (Korte) | 0 | 2 | 0 | 0 | 4 | 2 | X | X | 8 |
| Nunavut (MacDonald) | 0 | 0 | 0 | 1 | 0 | 0 | X | X | 1 |

| Sheet C | 1 | 2 | 3 | 4 | 5 | 6 | 7 | 8 | Final |
| New Brunswick (Sullivan) | 0 | 0 | 2 | 1 | 0 | 0 | 0 | X | 3 |
| Ontario (Anderson) | 1 | 0 | 0 | 0 | 2 | 3 | 0 | X | 6 |

| Sheet D | 1 | 2 | 3 | 4 | 5 | 6 | 7 | 8 | Final |
| Yukon (Smallwood) | 0 | 0 | 0 | 0 | 1 | 0 | 2 | X | 3 |
| British Columbia (Buchy) | 1 | 1 | 1 | 1 | 0 | 2 | 0 | X | 6 |

| Sheet E | 1 | 2 | 3 | 4 | 5 | 6 | 7 | 8 | Final |
| Northwest Territories (Koe) | 0 | 0 | 0 | 0 | 2 | 0 | X | X | 2 |
| Newfoundland and Labrador (Ford) | 2 | 2 | 1 | 1 | 0 | 4 | X | X | 10 |

==== Draw 8 ====
Wednesday November 15, 2:30pm

| Sheet A | 1 | 2 | 3 | 4 | 5 | 6 | 7 | 8 | 9 | Final |
| Manitoba (Dunstone) | 1 | 0 | 0 | 2 | 0 | 0 | 0 | 3 | 0 | 6 |
| Newfoundland and Labrador (Ford) | 0 | 2 | 0 | 0 | 2 | 1 | 1 | 0 | 1 | 7 |

| Sheet B | 1 | 2 | 3 | 4 | 5 | 6 | 7 | 8 | Final |
| Prince Edward Island (Watts) | 0 | 0 | 1 | 0 | 0 | 1 | 0 | X | 2 |
| Nova Scotia (MacDougall) | 0 | 2 | 0 | 2 | 0 | 0 | 1 | X | 5 |

| Sheet C | 1 | 2 | 3 | 4 | 5 | 6 | 7 | 8 | Final |
| Northern Ontario (Robert) | 0 | 2 | 0 | 1 | 0 | 0 | 0 | 2 | 5 |
| Yukon (Smallwood) | 1 | 0 | 1 | 0 | 1 | 0 | 1 | 0 | 4 |

| Sheet D | 1 | 2 | 3 | 4 | 5 | 6 | 7 | 8 | 9 | Final |
| Quebec (Desjardins) | 0 | 1 | 0 | 2 | 0 | 0 | 1 | 0 | 1 | 5 |
| Northwest Territories (Koe) | 0 | 0 | 0 | 0 | 1 | 1 | 0 | 2 | 0 | 4 |

| Sheet E | 1 | 2 | 3 | 4 | 5 | 6 | 7 | 8 | Final |
| Alberta (Cross) | 3 | 1 | 0 | 0 | 2 | 3 | 4 | X | 13 |
| Nunavut (MacDonald) | 0 | 0 | 2 | 1 | 0 | 0 | 0 | X | 3 |

==== Draw 9 ====
Wednesday November 15, 7:00pm

| Sheet A | 1 | 2 | 3 | 4 | 5 | 6 | 7 | 8 | Final |
| Ontario (Anderson) | 1 | 1 | 0 | 3 | 0 | 2 | 0 | X | 7 |
| Prince Edward Island (Watts) | 0 | 0 | 1 | 0 | 1 | 0 | 1 | X | 3 |

| Sheet B | 1 | 2 | 3 | 4 | 5 | 6 | 7 | 8 | Final |
| British Columbia (Buchy) | 0 | 0 | 0 | 1 | 0 | 0 | 2 | 0 | 3 |
| New Brunswick (Sullivan) | 0 | 1 | 0 | 0 | 2 | 1 | 0 | 1 | 5 |

| Sheet C | 1 | 2 | 3 | 4 | 5 | 6 | 7 | 8 | Final |
| Saskatchewan (Korte) | 0 | 0 | 0 | 1 | 0 | 0 | 0 | X | 1 |
| Quebec (Dejardins) | 2 | 0 | 1 | 0 | 1 | 0 | 1 | X | 5 |

| Sheet B | 1 | 2 | 3 | 4 | 5 | 6 | 7 | 8 | Final |
| Manitoba (Dunstone) | 0 | 0 | 1 | 1 | 0 | 0 | X | X | 2 |
| Alberta (Cross) | 2 | 6 | 0 | 0 | 3 | 1 | X | X | 12 |

| Sheet B | 1 | 2 | 3 | 4 | 5 | 6 | 7 | 8 | Final |
| Northern Ontario (Robert) | 0 | 0 | 0 | 0 | 0 | 2 | 0 | X | 2 |
| Nova Scotia (MacDougall) | 2 | 1 | 0 | 0 | 3 | 0 | 1 | X | 7 |

== Placement Round ==
=== Standings ===
Final round-robin standings

Key
| Teams to Playoffs |

| Championship Pool | Skip | W | L |
|---|---|---|---|
| Quebec | Robert Desjardins | 10 | 0 |
| Ontario | Mike Anderson | 8 | 2 |
| New Brunswick | Charlie Sullivan | 8 | 2 |
| Newfoundland and Labrador | Chris Ford | 6 | 4 |
| Nova Scotia | Brent MacDougall | 6 | 4 |
| Northwest Territories | Jamie Koe | 5 | 5 |
| Alberta | Warren Cross | 4 | 6 |
| Northern Ontario | Charlie Robert | 3 | 7 |

| Seeding Pool | Skip | W | L |
|---|---|---|---|
| Saskatchewan | Bruce Korte | 6 | 3 |
| British Columbia | Tom Buchy | 4 | 5 |
| Manitoba | Dean Dunstone | 3 | 6 |
| Yukon | Robert Smallwood | 2 | 7 |
| Prince Edward Island | Dennis Watts | 2 | 7 |
| Nunavut | Ed MacDonald | 0 | 9 |

=== Scores ===
==== Draw 10 ====
Thursday November 16, 10:00am

| Sheet A | 1 | 2 | 3 | 4 | 5 | 6 | 7 | 8 | Final |
| Quebec (Desjardins) | 0 | 2 | 0 | 0 | 1 | 1 | 0 | X | 4 |
| Northern Ontario (Robert) | 0 | 0 | 1 | 0 | 0 | 0 | 1 | X | 2 |

| Sheet B | 1 | 2 | 3 | 4 | 5 | 6 | 7 | 8 | 9 | Final |
| Newfoundland and Labrador (Ford) | 1 | 1 | 0 | 2 | 1 | 0 | 0 | 0 | 2 | 7 |
| Nova Scotia (MacDougall) | 0 | 0 | 2 | 0 | 0 | 0 | 1 | 2 | 0 | 5 |

| Sheet C | 1 | 2 | 3 | 4 | 5 | 6 | 7 | 8 | Final |
| Northwest Territories (Koe) | 2 | 0 | 1 | 1 | 0 | 0 | 0 | 0 | 4 |
| New Brunswick (Sullivan) | 0 | 2 | 0 | 0 | 0 | 2 | 1 | 1 | 6 |

| Sheet D | 1 | 2 | 3 | 4 | 5 | 6 | 7 | 8 | Final |
| Alberta (Cross) | 0 | 2 | 1 | 0 | 0 | 0 | 2 | 0 | 5 |
| Ontario (Anderson) | 2 | 0 | 0 | 2 | 1 | 1 | 0 | 1 | 7 |

| Sheet E | 1 | 2 | 3 | 4 | 5 | 6 | 7 | 8 | 9 | Final |
| Manitoba (Dunstone) | 0 | 1 | 0 | 2 | 1 | 1 | 0 | 0 | 2 | 7 |
| Yukon (Smallwood) | 1 | 0 | 1 | 0 | 0 | 0 | 2 | 1 | 0 | 5 |

==== Draw 11 ====
Thursday November 16, 2:30pm

| Team | 1 | 2 | 3 | 4 | 5 | 6 | 7 | 8 | Final |
| British Columbia (Buchy) | 0 | 3 | 0 | 0 | 0 | 0 | 0 | X | 3 |
| Manitoba (Dunstone) | 3 | 0 | 2 | 1 | 2 | 1 | 2 | X | 11 |

| Team | 1 | 2 | 3 | 4 | 5 | 6 | 7 | 8 | Final |
| Nunavut (MacDonald) | 0 | 0 | 0 | 0 | 0 | 0 | X | X | 0 |
| Yukon (Smallwood) | 2 | 2 | 3 | 0 | 2 | 0 | X | X | 9 |

| Team | 1 | 2 | 3 | 4 | 5 | 6 | 7 | 8 | Final |
| Saskatchewan (Korte) | 4 | 4 | 0 | 5 | 0 | 1 | X | X | 14 |
| Prince Edward Island (Watts) | 0 | 0 | 1 | 0 | 1 | 0 | X | X | 2 |

==== Draw 12 ====
Thursday November 16, 7:00pm

| Team | 1 | 2 | 3 | 4 | 5 | 6 | 7 | 8 | Final |
| New Brunswick (Sullivan) | 0 | 2 | 0 | 1 | 2 | 0 | 3 | X | 8 |
| Alberta (Cross) | 0 | 0 | 2 | 0 | 0 | 2 | 0 | X | 4 |

| Team | 1 | 2 | 3 | 4 | 5 | 6 | 7 | 8 | Final |
| Prince Edward Island (Watts) | 0 | 4 | 1 | 1 | 0 | 7 | X | X | 13 |
| Nunavut (MacDonald) | 1 | 0 | 0 | 0 | 4 | 0 | X | X | 5 |

| Team | 1 | 2 | 3 | 4 | 5 | 6 | 7 | 8 | Final |
| Nova Scotia (MacDougall) | 0 | 0 | 0 | 0 | 0 | 0 | 2 | 0 | 2 |
| Quebec (Desjardins) | 0 | 0 | 1 | 1 | 0 | 0 | 0 | 1 | 3 |

| Team | 1 | 2 | 3 | 4 | 5 | 6 | 7 | 8 | Final |
| Northern Ontario (Robert) | 0 | 0 | 1 | 0 | 1 | 0 | 0 | X | 2 |
| Newfoundland and Labrador (Ford) | 1 | 2 | 0 | 0 | 0 | 1 | 1 | X | 5 |

| Team | 1 | 2 | 3 | 4 | 5 | 6 | 7 | 8 | Final |
| Ontario (Anderson) | 0 | 1 | 0 | 1 | 0 | 1 | 0 | 3 | 6 |
| Northwest Territories (Koe) | 1 | 0 | 1 | 0 | 2 | 0 | 1 | 0 | 5 |

==== Draw 13 ====
Friday November 17, 10:00am

| Team | 1 | 2 | 3 | 4 | 5 | 6 | 7 | 8 | Final |
| Northwest Territories (Koe) | 0 | 2 | 0 | 0 | 1 | 0 | 2 | 4 | 9 |
| Northern Ontario (Robert) | 1 | 0 | 1 | 1 | 0 | 0 | 0 | 0 | 3 |

| Team | 1 | 2 | 3 | 4 | 5 | 6 | 7 | 8 | Final |
| Alberta (Cross) | 0 | 1 | 1 | 0 | 1 | 0 | 0 | X | 3 |
| Nova Scotia (MacDougall) | 1 | 0 | 0 | 1 | 0 | 2 | 1 | X | 5 |

| Team | 1 | 2 | 3 | 4 | 5 | 6 | 7 | 8 | Final |
| Newfoundland and Labrador (Ford) | 1 | 0 | 1 | 0 | 0 | 0 | 1 | X | 3 |
| Ontario (Anderson) | 0 | 1 | 0 | 3 | 1 | 1 | 0 | X | 6 |

| Team | 1 | 2 | 3 | 4 | 5 | 6 | 7 | 8 | Final |
| Quebec (Desjardins) | 0 | 2 | 0 | 0 | 0 | 0 | 0 | 1 | 3 |
| New Brunswick (Sullivan) | 0 | 0 | 0 | 1 | 0 | 1 | 0 | 0 | 2 |

==== Draw 14 ====
Friday November 17, 2:30pm

| Team | 1 | 2 | 3 | 4 | 5 | 6 | 7 | 8 | Final |
| Yukon (Smallwood) | 0 | 2 | 0 | 0 | 1 | 1 | 0 | 0 | 4 |
| Saskatchewan (Korte) | 1 | 0 | 0 | 3 | 0 | 0 | 0 | 1 | 5 |

| Team | 1 | 2 | 3 | 4 | 5 | 6 | 7 | 8 | 9 | Final |
| Manitoba (Dunstone) | 0 | 1 | 1 | 1 | 0 | 0 | 1 | 0 | 0 | 4 |
| Prince Edward Island (Watts) | 1 | 0 | 0 | 0 | 0 | 1 | 0 | 2 | 1 | 5 |

| Team | 1 | 2 | 3 | 4 | 5 | 6 | 7 | 8 | Final |
| British Columbia (Buchy) | 0 | 1 | 3 | 0 | 0 | 3 | 0 | 1 | 8 |
| Nunavut (MacDonald) | 3 | 0 | 0 | 0 | 1 | 0 | 1 | 0 | 5 |

==== Draw 15 ====
Friday November 17, 7:00pm

| Team | 1 | 2 | 3 | 4 | 5 | 6 | 7 | 8 | Final |
| Ontario (Anderson) | 0 | 0 | 2 | 0 | 0 | 0 | 2 | 0 | 4 |
| Quebec (Desjardins) | 0 | 1 | 0 | 2 | 0 | 1 | 0 | 1 | 5 |

| Team | 1 | 2 | 3 | 4 | 5 | 6 | 7 | 8 | 9 | Final |
| New Brunswick (Sullivan) | 0 | 2 | 0 | 1 | 1 | 1 | 0 | 0 | 1 | 6 |
| Newfoundland and Labrador (Ford) | 1 | 0 | 2 | 0 | 0 | 0 | 1 | 1 | 0 | 5 |

| Team | 1 | 2 | 3 | 4 | 5 | 6 | 7 | 8 | Final |
| Saskatchewan (Korte) | 3 | 0 | 3 | 0 | 2 | 0 | 2 | X | 10 |
| British Columbia (Buchy) | 0 | 2 | 0 | 1 | 0 | 1 | 0 | X | 4 |

| Team | 1 | 2 | 3 | 4 | 5 | 6 | 7 | 8 | Final |
| Nova Scotia (MacDougall) | 4 | 0 | 0 | 0 | 1 | 0 | 0 | 0 | 5 |
| Northwest Territories (Koe) | 0 | 0 | 1 | 0 | 0 | 1 | 1 | 1 | 4 |

| Team | 1 | 2 | 3 | 4 | 5 | 6 | 7 | 8 | Final |
| Northern Ontario (Robert) | 2 | 0 | 2 | 0 | 1 | 0 | 1 | 0 | 6 |
| Alberta (Cross) | 0 | 2 | 0 | 2 | 0 | 3 | 0 | 2 | 9 |

== Playoffs ==
Semifinals
1 | Quebec | 9
4 | Newfoundland and Labrador | 2
2 | Ontario | 7
3 | New Brunswick | 6

Final
1 | Quebec | 3
2 | Ontario | 7

| Bronze medal game |
| 3 | New Brunswick | 3 |
| 4 | Newfoundland and Labrador | 6 |

=== Semifinals ===
Saturday, November 18, 10:00 am

| Team | 1 | 2 | 3 | 4 | 5 | 6 | 7 | 8 | Final |
| Quebec (Desjardins) | 2 | 0 | 4 | 1 | 1 | 0 | 1 | X | 9 |
| Newfoundland and Labrador (Ford) | 0 | 1 | 0 | 0 | 0 | 1 | 0 | X | 2 |

| Team | 1 | 2 | 3 | 4 | 5 | 6 | 7 | 8 | 9 | Final |
| Ontario (Anderson) | 2 | 0 | 0 | 2 | 1 | 0 | 1 | 0 | 1 | 7 |
| New Brunswick (Sullivan) | 0 | 2 | 1 | 0 | 0 | 1 | 0 | 2 | 0 | 6 |

=== Bronze medal game ===
Saturday, November 18, 3:00 pm

| Team | 1 | 2 | 3 | 4 | 5 | 6 | 7 | 8 | Final |
| New Brunswick (Sullivan) | 0 | 0 | 1 | 0 | 0 | 1 | 1 | 0 | 3 |
| Newfoundland and Labrador (Ford) | 2 | 0 | 0 | 1 | 2 | 0 | 0 | 1 | 6 |

=== Final ===
Saturday, November 18, 3:00 pm

| Team | 1 | 2 | 3 | 4 | 5 | 6 | 7 | 8 | Final |
| Quebec (Desjardins) | 2 | 0 | 0 | 1 | 0 | 0 | 0 | 0 | 3 |
| Ontario (Anderson) | 0 | 1 | 0 | 0 | 0 | 2 | 1 | 3 | 7 |
