= Kelly Mann (sports administrator) =

Canadian sports administrator (born 1958)

- Born: Kelly James Mann; June 1958 (age 67); Ladysmith, British Columbia, Canada
- Occupation: Sport administrator

Kelly James Mann (born June 1958) is a Canadian sport administrator and former President and CEO of the BC Games Society. Mann is a member of the BC Sports Hall of Fame, having been inducted as part of the 2021 class.

== Career ==
Mann worked for the BC Games Society from 1992 until 2018. In 1999, Mann succeeded Roger Skillings as president and CEO, who had served in that role since 1987. During his time as president and CEO, Mann moved the BC Games from a participation model, to one of athlete, coach and sport development, turning the BC Games Society into a national leader in long-term sport development. Mann announced his resignation as president and CEO of the BC Games Society in May 2018 after 26 years with the organization. Former BC Games Society Event Manager Alison Noble was named as his replacement two months later.

In 2001, Mann co-founded KidSport Greater Victoria, a chapter of the national charitable organization which provides registration fees for financially disadvantaged children to participate in sport. Mann served as chair for the organization from its inception until 2009, growing the local chapter to become the largest in British Columbia and second largest in Canada.

Mann has held positions on a number of board of directors and committees. Beginning in 2011, Mann served a two-year term on the board of directors of the Pacific Institute for Sport Excellence. In 2011, Mann joined the board of directors for the 2015 Canada Winter Games in Prince George, British Columbia. Mann was named as an inaugural member of the Victoria HarbourCats Advisory Board in April 2015. In July 2017, he furthered his work with the HarbourCats by joining the inaugural Board of the HarbourCats Foundation, a charitable foundation created by the team to support baseball and softball efforts in Greater Victoria. Mann currently sits as a member of the board of the 94 Forward Society, the legacy fund of the 1994 Commonwealth Games. He also chairs the Greater Victoria Sports Awards.

== Honours ==
Throughout his career, Mann has received numerous honours for his work in sport. At the 36th Annual Victoria Sports Awards in April 2002, Mann was named the Sportsman of the Year for 2001. In January 2011, Mann was among ten sport leaders from Greater Victoria recognized by Sport BC with the Community Sport Hero Award for their volunteer contribution to sport in the region. In September 2017, Mann was awarded the inaugural Inspired Service Award by the BC Sports Hall of Fame. Mann was subsequently inducted into the BC Sports Hall of Fame in the builder category as part of the 2021 induction class. In 2024, Mann was inducted into the Greater Victoria Sports Hall of Fame as a builder.

Mann participated in the Rick Hansen 25th Anniversary Relay by running a leg of the relay in Coquitlam, British Columbia on May 18, 2012.

Mann was awarded the Queen Elizabeth II Diamond Jubilee Medal by Premier of British Columbia Christy Clark in February 2013. One month later, Mann was among thirty-two British Columbians honoured at the tenth annual British Columbia Community Achievement Awards. He was presented the award by Lieutenant Governor of British Columbia Judith Guichon and Member of the Legislative Assembly for Oak Bay-Gordon Head Ida Chong. Mann was selected to speak on behalf of the thirty-two recipients at the award ceremony.
