= Community Living British Columbia =

Community Living British Columbia (CLBC) is a provincial crown agency of the provincial government of British Columbia.

CLBC is accountable to the provincial government of British Columbia through the Minister of Social Development and Social Innovation. CLBC is mandated under the Community Living Authority Act to provide a range of supports and services for adults with developmental disabilities, or adults with fetal alcohol spectrum disorder, and autism spectrum disorder adults who have significant challenges in daily living. CLBC currently supports more than 13,000 individuals with developmental disabilities.

== Governance ==
CLBC is governed by a board of directors appointed under the provisions of the Community Living Authority Act. The board, together with the CEO and CLBC executive, manages the organization in accordance with corporate governance best practices and the requirements of the enabling legislation, the Community Living Authority Act, and other applicable laws. The board chair serves as the key link between the government and CLBC, advising the Minister of Social Development and Social Innovation on issues that materially affect CLBC’s operations or the Minister’s interests and accountabilities. The board also guides senior management in implementing CLBC’s service delivery model.

== History and Financial Structure ==
CLBC was incorporated July 1, 2005 and assumed the policy, budgetary, contractual and operational responsibility for the delivery of community living services to children with special needs and adults with developmental disabilities and their families.

On April 1, 2009, policy and budgetary responsibility for all community living services to children with special needs was transferred to the Ministry of Children and Family Development (MCFD) and on October 31, 2009, full operational and contractual responsibility for these services was assumed by the MCFD including the transfer of the related regional staff and support infrastructure. In February 2010 CLBC introduced a new program called the Personalized Supports Initiative. The Personalized Supports Initiative provides services to adults who do not have a developmental disability but have significant limitations in adaptive functioning and have a diagnosis of either fetal alcohol spectrum disorder or autism spectrum disorder.

CLBC provides its program services through contractual arrangements with individuals and non-profit and private agencies throughout the province, through direct funding to families, and through the operation of the Provincial Assessment Centre. Management of CLBC's contractual relationships and the planning and support for individuals and their families is conducted through offices in eleven Quality Service areas and seventeen Community Living Centres distributed around the province of BC, supported by corporate offices in Vancouver.

CLBC has an operating budget of approximately $825 million. 93% of CLBC's expenditures go toward contracted and direct program services to supported individuals.

Funding for CLBC operations is provided by contributions from the Province of British Columbia, recoveries from MCFD for expenditures on staff and services to support children with special needs, recoveries from health authorities relating to supported individuals with health related issues and miscellaneous income and recoveries.

The Community Living Authority Act mandates that CLBC not operate at a deficit without the prior approval of the Minister.
