= 2008 CIS/CCA Curling Championships =

Canadian Interuniversity Sport (CIS) and the CCA combined to host the first national curling championship hosted by the University of Waterloo. It was held from March 12 to 16, 2008 at the Guelph Curling Club and Elora Curling Club.

The inaugural event for the men and women was won by the Wilfrid Laurier Golden Hawks.

== Men's tournament ==
In men's play the top teams after pool play were:

1. Lakehead Thunderwolves
2. Brock Badgers
3. Laurier Golden Hawks
4. Queen's Golden Gaels
5. Calgary Dinos

Men's Pool A	W	L
Laurier	5	1
Guelph	4	2
Calgary	4	2
McGill	3	3
Victoria	1	5
Saint Mary's	0	6

Men's Pool B	W	L
Brock	5	1
Queen's	5	1
Alberta	3	3
Western	3	3
Manitoba	2	4
St Francis Xavier	1	5

Men's Pool C	W	L
Lakehead	6	0
Memorial	4	2
Regina	3	3
Waterloo	2	4
Lethbridge	2	4
Laurentian	2	4
Brandon	2	4

Tie-Breakers
1	Regina	10
4	McGill	4
3	Western	9
2	Alberta	4

Tie-Breakers
Regina	6
Western	4

Quarter-final
1	Lakehead	4
8	Regina	9
4	Queen's	4
5	Calgary	6
3	Laurier	8
6	Guelph	3
2	Brock	9
7	Memorial	4

Semi-final
8	Regina	5
5	Calagary	7
3	Laurier	10
2	Brock	2

Final
5	Calgary	4
3	Laurier	9

Sheet Guelph-6	1	2	3	4	5	6	7	8	9	10	Final
Calgary (Thomas)	0	0	1	0	0	2	0	1	0	X	4
Laurier (Anderson)	1	1	0	1	1	0	1	0	4	X	9

== Women's tournament ==
In women's play the top teams after pool play were:

1. Brock Badgers
2. Manitoba Bisons
3. Saint Mary's Huskies
4. Laurentian Lady Vees
5. Calgary Dinos

In the end the Golden Hawks swept to victory in both division. Especially impressive were the female Hawks who started out 0-3 and then won 7 in a row to claim victory.

Sheet Guelph-4	1	2	3	4	5	6	7	8	9	10	Final
Laurier (Nicol)	1	0	0	0	1	0	1	1	1	2	7
Manitoba (Strath)	0	1	1	1	0	1	0	0	0	0	4

== See also ==
- Curling
- Canadian Curling Association
- University and college curling
- 2009 Winter Universiade
