= SkilledTradesBC =

SkilledTradesBC is a provincial government agency in the province of British Columbia, Canada.

It was established in 2004 as Industry Training Authority (ITA) to replace the Industry, Training and Apprenticeship Commission (ITAC) after the Government of BC abolished mandatory certification for skilled trades in 2003. Its mandate is to facilitate training in the trades and industry occupations in the province.

In 2021, the Government of BC announced the reintroduction of mandatory skilled trades certification and the ITA was renamed to SkilledTradesBC in December 2022.

SkilledTradesBC offers support to future and existing tradespeople with Regional Apprenticeship Advisors supporting individuals accessing schooling, filing hours and experience and more.

The Province of BC announced announcement investment in skilled trades funding in November, 2024 with a focus on:

- increase per-seat funding for apprentice programs;
- address waiting lists for critical industrial trades, ensuring faster access to training;
- advance skilled-trades certification, beginning with crane operators; and
- as opportunities evolve, ensure workers can move easily between industries.

This was a significant announcement as there had been no investments of this kind for close to 20 years.
