= Quebec Games =

Biennial multi-sport event in Quebec, Canada

Quebec Games Jeux du Québec
- Location of Quebec Games/Jeux du Québec
- Purpose: Quebec under-18 multi-sport event
- Frequency: Every 2 years (alternating between Summer and Winter Games)
- Inaugurated: 1970; 56 years ago
- Headquarters: Montreal, Quebec, Canada
- Website: www.jeuxduquebec.com

The Quebec Games (French: Jeux du Québec, pronounced [ʒø dy kebɛk]) is a biennial multi-sport event, held every two years in the Canadian province of Quebec, alternating between the Quebec Winter Games and the Quebec Summer Games. Athletes are strictly amateur only, and represent their region.

The Games were founded in 1970. The first editions of both the Quebec Winter Games and Quebec Summer Games were held in 1971. Since 1981, they have held every odd year. Since 2009, a Quebec Games is held every year, alternating between Winter Games (odd years) and Summer Games (even years).

== History ==
The 2016 edition was held at Montreal's Olympic Stadium in conjunction with the 40th Anniversary Celebrations of the 1976 Montreal Summer Olympics. At around 3700 athletes, the event was larger than the last Winter Olympics in 2014.

== Winter sports ==
A total of 26 sports are a part of the Quebec Winter Games as of 2021 and include the following:

- Badminton
- Para-badminton
- Wheelchair basketball
- Biathlon
- Boccia (AQSPC)
- Boxing (Olympic)
- Curling
- Fencing
- Gymnastics (Artistic)
- Weightlifting
- Handball (Olympic)
- Ice hockey
- Judo
- Karate
- Figure skating
- Short track speed skating
- Long track speed skating
- Diving
- Ringette
- Freestyle skiing (bumps)
- Alpine skiing
- Cross-country skiing
- Taekwondo
- Table tennis
- Trampolining

== Summer sports ==
A total of 28 sports are a part of the Quebec Summer Games as of 2021 and include the following:

- Athletics
- Wheelchair Athletics
  a.k.a. Para-athletics
- Rowing
- Baseball
- Basketball
- BMX racing
- White Water Rafting
- Canoe sprint
- Cycling (Road - Track)
- Goalball (ASAQ)
- Golf
- Swimming (including Open Water)
- Paracycling
- Paraswimming
- Powerchair Soccer
  a.k.a. Powerchair Football
- Artistic swimming
- Rugby sevens
- Sports Rescue
  - still water rescue and inshore rescue
- Football (called Soccer)
- Softball
- Equestrian sports
- Tennis
- Archery
- Triathlon
- Mountain biking
- Sailing
- Volleyball
- Beach volleyball
- Water polo

== Host cities ==
Year	Winter Games	Summer Games
1971	Laval	Rivière-du-Loup
1972	Montreal	Chicoutimi
1973		Rouyn-Noranda
1974	Saint-Georges	Salaberry-de-Valleyfield
1975	Rimouski	Trois-Rivières
1976	Jonquière	
1977	LaSalle, Quebec	Sherbrooke
1978	Amos	Joliette
1979		Saint-Georges
1980	Thetford Mines	
1981	Victoriaville	Hull
1983	St. Leonard	Sept-Îles
1985	Dolbeau-Mistassini	Charlesbourg
1987	Saint-Jérôme	Val-d'Or
1989	Matane	Saint-Jean-sur-Richelieu
1991	Mauricie	Laval
1993	Baie-Comeau	Gaspé
1995	Granby	Sherbrooke
1997	Les Chutes-de-la-Chaudière RCM	Montreal
1999	Trois-Rivières	Alma
2001	Rimouski	Lachine
2003	Portneuf RCM	L'Amiante RCM
2005	Saint-Hyacinthe	Amos
2007	L'Assomption RCM	Sept-Îles
2009	Blainville/Rosemère/Sainte-Thérèse	
2010		Gatineau
2011	Beauharnois/Salaberry-de-Valleyfield	
2012		Shawinigan
2013	Saguenay	
2014		Longueuil
2015	Drummondville	
2016		Montreal
2017	Alma	
2018		Thetford Mines
2019	Quebec City	

== Regions ==
For the purpose of the games, Quebec is sub-divided into 19 regions. Each region carries out its own competitions in each sport, from which the best athletes are chosen to compete at the provincial level.

Quebec Games Region	Quebec Administrative Region(s)	Regional County Municipalities, Cities/Towns or Boroughs included
Abitibi-Témiscamingue	Abitibi-Témiscamingue; Nord-du-Québec	
Bourassa	Montreal (region)	Boroughs of Montreal: Anjou; Montréal-Nord; St. Leonard Independent city: Montréal-Est
Capitale-Nationale	Capitale-Nationale	
Centre-du-Québec	Centre-du-Québec	
Chaudière-Appalaches	Chaudière-Appalaches	
Côte-Nord	Côte-Nord	
Est-du-Québec	Bas-Saint-Laurent; Gaspésie–Îles-de-la-Madeleine	
Estrie	Estrie	
Lac-Saint-Louis	Montreal (region)	Boroughs of Montreal: Lachine; LaSalle; L'Île-Bizard–Sainte-Geneviève; Outremont; Pierrefonds-Roxboro; Verdun Independent cities: Baie-d'Urfé; Beaconsfield; Côte Saint-Luc; Dollard-des-Ormeaux; Dorval; Dorval Island; Hampstead; Kirkland; Montreal West; Mount Royal; Pointe-Claire; Sainte-Anne-de-Bellevue; Saint-Laurent; Senneville; Westmount
Lanaudière	Lanaudière	
Laurentides	Laurentides	
Laval	Laval	
Mauricie	Mauricie	
Montreal	Montreal (region)	Boroughs of Montreal: Ahuntsic-Cartierville; Côte-des-Neiges–Notre-Dame-de-Grâce; Le Plateau-Mont-Royal; Le Sud-Ouest; Mercier–Hochelaga-Maisonneuve; Rivière-des-Prairies–Pointe-aux-Trembles; Rosemont–La Petite-Patrie; Villeray–Saint-Michel–Parc-Extension
Outaouais	Outaouais	
Richelieu-Yamaska	Montérégie	Regional County Municipalities: Acton; Brome-Missisquoi; La Haute-Yamaska; La Vallée-du-Richelieu; Les Maskoutains; Pierre-De Saurel; Rouville
Rive-Sud	Montérégie	Regional County Municipalities/Equivalent Territories: La Vallée-du-Richelieu; Le Haut-Richelieu; Les Jardins-de-Napierville; Marguerite-D'Youville; Roussillon; Rouville, Longueuil (agglomeration)
Saguenay–Lac-Saint-Jean	Saguenay–Lac-Saint-Jean; Nord-du-Québec	
Sud-Ouest	Montérégie	Regional County Municipalities/Equivalent Territories: Beauharnois-Salaberry; Kahnawake; Le Haut-Saint-Laurent; Roussillon; Vaudreuil-Soulanges

== See also ==
- Canada Games
  - Canada Summer Games
  - Canada Winter Games
- Western Canada Summer Games
- BC Games
  - BC Summer Games
  - BC Winter Games
- Alberta Winter Games
- Saskatchewan Games
- Manitoba Games
- Ontario Games
