= Manitoba Games =

- Location of Manitoba Games
- Status: Active
- Genre: Multi-sport event
- Frequency: Biennial
- Location: Various
- Country: Canada
- Inaugurated: 1974; 52 years ago (summer); 1974; 52 years ago (winter)
- Organizer: Sport Manitoba
- Sponsor: Manitoba Hydro
- Website: https://www.mbgames.ca

The Manitoba Games are a multi-sport event in Manitoba, Canada, held every two years and are organized by Sport Manitoba. The event has two different seasonal events: the winter games and summer games. The event consists of teams held from all regions of the province. The teams include Winnipeg, Parkland, Eastman, Westman, Northern, and Interlake. The first event was held in Winnipeg in 1974.

== Sports ==
=== Summer sports ===
The Manitoba Summer Games consist of the following 12 sports:

- Athletics
- Baseball
- Basketball
- Cycling
- Golf
- Rugby
- Sailing
- Soccer
- Softball
- Swimming
- Triathlon
- Volleyball

=== Winter sports ===
The Manitoba Winter Games consist of the following 12 sports:

- Alpine skiing
- Archery
- Badminton
- Cross-country skiing
- Curling
- Figure Skating
- Futsal
- Gymnastics
- Ice hockey
- Ringette
- Short-track speed skating
- Wrestling

== List of hosts by year ==
The first Manitoba Games were held in 1974 in Winnipeg and was the Winter session. The Manitoba Games were not held between 1980 and 1984.

=== Manitoba Summer Games ===
Hosts: Manitoba Summer Games
| Year | Host |
|---|---|
| 1976 | Neepawa |
1980 to 1984 – Not held
| 1988 | Beausejour/Pinawa |
| 1992 | Minnedosa/Neepawa |
| 1996 | Morden |
| 2000 | Virden |
| 2004 | Dauphin |
| 2008 | Carman |
| 2012 | Swan River Valley |
| 2016 | Steinbach |
| 2020 | Dauphin : cancelled due to COVID-19 |
| 2024 | Dauphin |

=== Manitoba Winter Games ===
Hosts: Manitoba Winter Games
| Year | Host |
|---|---|
| 1974 | Winnipeg |
| 1978 | Dauphin |
1980 to 1984 – Not held
| 1986 | Flin Flon |
| 1990 | Carman |
| 1994 | Thompson |
| 1998 | Gimli |
| 2002 | The Pas/Opaskwayak Cree Nation |
| 2006 | Beausejour |
| 2010 | Portage la Prairie |
| 2014 | Morden/Stanley/Winkler |
| 2018 | Thompson |
| 2022 | Niverville : cancelled due to COVID-19 |
| 2026 | Thompson |

== See also ==
- Canada Games
  - Canada Summer Games
  - Canada Winter Games
- Western Canada Summer Games
- BC Games
  - BC Summer Games
  - BC Winter Games
- Alberta Winter Games
- Saskatchewan Games
- Ontario Games
- Quebec Games
