= BC Systems Corporation =

Crown corporation of British Columbia

- Formation: September 1, 1977
- Dissolved: 1996; 30 years ago
- Type: Crown corporation
- Headquarters: 4000 Seymour Pl, Victoria, British Columbia, Canada

BC Systems Corporation was a Crown corporation established by the System Act, RSBC 1979, on 1 September 1977. It provided information technology and communications services for provincial ministries and other entities from offices in Victoria, BC. In 1983, its budget was around $65 million per year and growing, leading to calls to sell it off and let private companies compete for the business. The future of the corporation was widely debated in the news in the 1980s and 1990s. BC Systems provided on-site daycare and promoted alternatives to commuting in single-passenger automobiles, and an alumni association meets to reminisce about the early days of the corporation.

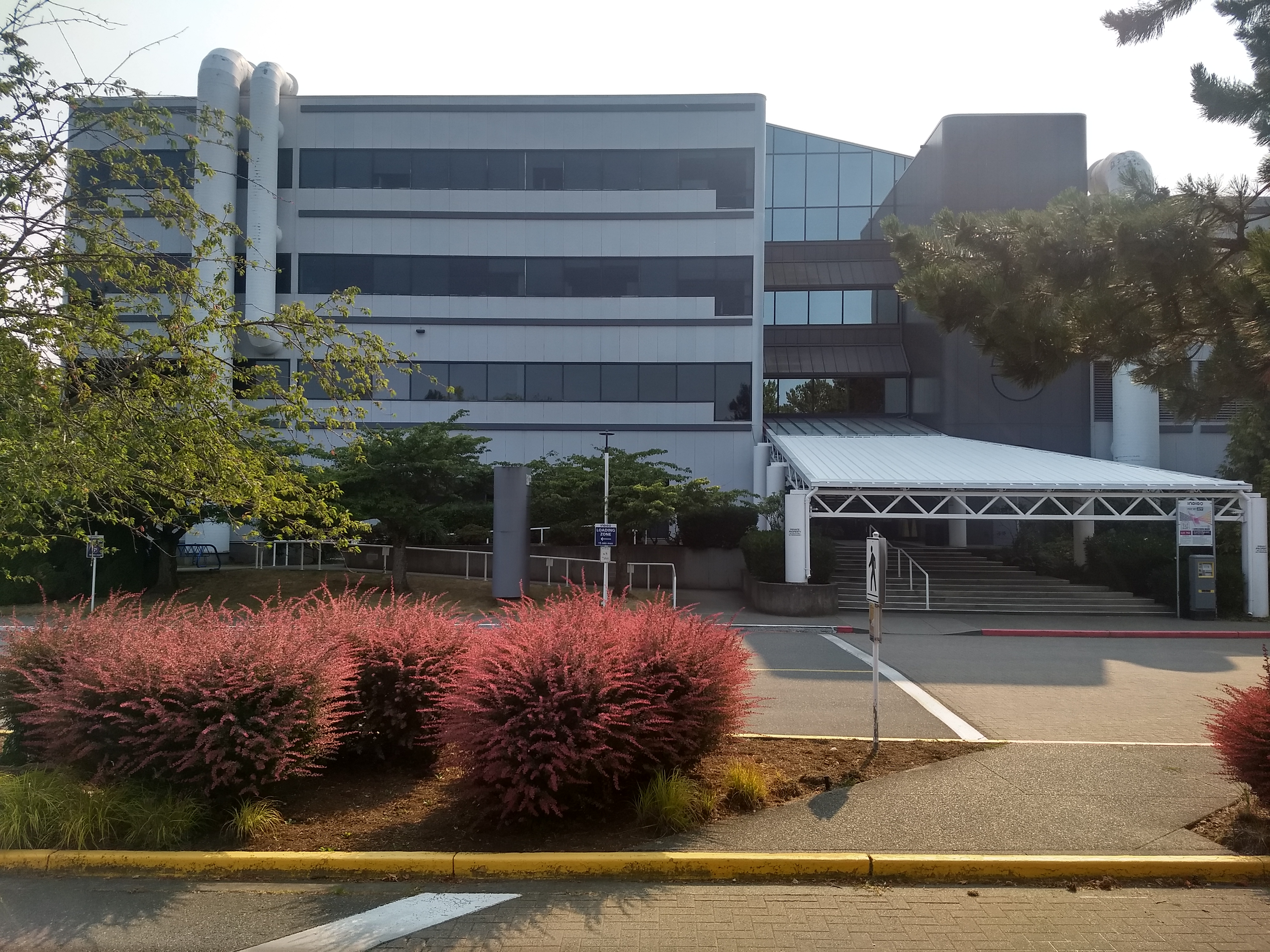
4000 Seymour Place

BC Systems was broken up in 1996. A series of annual reports document the corporation's major activities and finances. The headquarters building at 4000 Seymour Place continues in use by public-sector entities, such as the Maritime Museum of British Columbia.
