= BC Summer Games =

- Location of BC Summer Games
- Status: Active
- Genre: Multi-sport event
- Frequency: Biennially
- Location: Various
- Country: Canada

The BC Summer Games are an amateur sporting event held every year biennially in the province of British Columbia, Canada. The next games are scheduled to be held in Kelowna in July 2026.

== See also ==
- BC Games
  - BC Winter Games
- Canada Games
  - Canada Summer Games
  - Canada Winter Games
- Western Canada Summer Games
- Alberta Winter Games
- Saskatchewan Games
- Manitoba Games
- Ontario Games
- Quebec Games
