= Alberta Winter Games =

Canadian provincial multi-sport competition

- Location of Alberta Games
- Status: Active
- Genre: Multi-sports event
- Frequency: Biennial
- Country: Canada
- Inaugurated: 1976; 50 years ago, Winter
- Organizer: Sport Alberta
- Website: albertasport.ca/alberta-games/summer2020/

The Alberta Winter Games (AWG) is a Canadian provincial multi-sport event hosted in the province of Alberta. It is the winter portion of the multi-sport Alberta Games, which also involves the Alberta Summer Games and is strictly for amateur athletes. The inaugural year for the Alberta Winter Games was in 1976 and was hosted in Banff, Alberta.

This event is held independently from the national Canadian event, the Canada Winter Games. Since 2000, the Alberta Winter Games and the Alberta Summer Games have been held every two years in the same calendar year, a change made in order to help to align the Alberta Games' cycle with the Canada Games.

== Sports ==
A total of 19 sports are a part of the Alberta Winter Games and include the following:

- Alpine skiing
- Archery
- Gymnastics
- Badminton
- Biathlon
- Boxing
- Cross-country skiing
- Curling
- Fencing
- Figure skating
- Freestyle skiing
- Ice hockey
- Judo
- Ringette
- Speed skating
- Squash
- Artistic swimming
  a.k.a. Synchronized Swimming
- Volleyball
- Amateur Wrestling

== See also ==
- Canada Games
  - Canada Summer Games
  - Canada Winter Games
- Western Canada Summer Games
- BC Games
  - BC Summer Games
  - BC Winter Games
- Saskatchewan Games
- Manitoba Games
- Ontario Games
- Quebec Games
