= Kelly Mann (special effects artist) =

American costume designer (born 1959)

Kelly Mann (born July 12, 1959, in Pennsylvania) is a motion picture special effects practitioner, make-up artist and noted restorer of rubber masks and props. He is known in monster mask collecting circles as "The Mask Doctor".

Film and television make-up credits include A Nightmare on Elm Street Part III (1986), The Dark Wind (1991), Home Alone 2: Lost in New York (1992), A Kiss Goodnight (1994), and My Favorite Martian (1999).

He has written and produced a video Build Your Own Haunted House to instruct anyone on building a Halloween Halloween Haunt.
