= Saskatchewan Games =

Canadian multi-sport event

- Status: Active
- Genre: Multi-sport event
- Frequency: Biennial
- Location: Various
- Country: Canada
- Years active: 1972-present
- Inaugurated: 1972; 54 years ago (summer); 1974; 52 years ago (winter)
- Organiser: Saskatchewan Games Council
- Website: https://saskgames.ca/

The Saskatchewan Summer Games and Saskatchewan Winter Games are biennial multi-sport events held in the Canadian province of Saskatchewan. The governing body for the Saskatchewan Games is the Saskatchewan Games Council, a non-profit organization who has held responsibility for organizing the Games since 2006. Prior to the Council's incorporation, the program was managed by the Government of Saskatchewan. The Council is a member organization of Sask Sport Inc. and receives funding through Sask Lotteries.

The most recent Saskatchewan Winter Games took place in Regina from February 18–23, 2023, while the most recent Saskatchewan Summer Games took place in Lloydminster from July 21–27, 2024. The next edition of the Winter Games will take place in Flying Dust First Nation and the City of Meadow Lake from February 15–21, 2026; this will mark the first time in the program's history that a First Nation and neighbouring city will co-host the event.

The purpose of the Saskatchewan Games is to provide an opportunity for the province’s developing athletes, coaches and officials to participate in a multi sport event in preparation for a higher level of competition. Many Saskatchewan Games alumni have gone on to compete at larger national and international events, including the Canada Games and the North American Indigenous Games. A number of Canadian Olympic champions, including Colleen Sostorics, Emily Clark, and Lucas Makowsky, competed at the Saskatchewan Games early in their athletic careers.

== History ==
The games began in 1972 when Roy Romanow, then Minister in charge of the Saskatchewan Youth Agency, announced the inauguration of the Games. The first Saskatchewan Summer Games were held in 1972 in Moose Jaw, and the first Saskatchewan Winter Games were held two years later in North Battleford.

The 2020 Saskatchewan Summer Games were initially scheduled to be held in Lloydminster. They were postponed to 2021 due to the COVID-19 pandemic, but on December 21, 2020, it was announced that the games had been cancelled in full due to continued health and safety concerns. Lloydminster received the right of first refusal to host the 2024 Games, which it accepted. In January 2022, the 2022 Saskatchewan Winter Games were also postponed due to COVID-19, citing the current Omicron variant and advice from public health officials. The postponed Winter Games went forward in February 2023.

== Host cities ==
Host cities of Saskatchewan Games

Citing that they typically bid for national and international events, and to encourage the Games to be held in smaller cities, Regina and Saskatoon are ineligible to bid for any Saskatchewan Games. An exception was made for the 2023 Saskatchewan Winter Games, which were awarded for the first time to Regina; the Saskatchewan Games Council cited the impact of the COVID-19 pandemic on smaller cities, and as being a special occasion to mark the 50th anniversary of the Saskatchewan Games.

Summer	Winter
1972 Moose Jaw	1974 The Battlefords
1976 Swift Current	1978 Moose Jaw
1980 Estevan	1982 Prince Albert
1984 The Battlefords	1986 Yorkton
1988 Melfort	1990 Melville/Ituna
1992 Prince Albert	1994 Kindersley
1996 Moose Jaw	1998 Nipawin
2000 Yorkton	2002 Humboldt
2004 Weyburn	2006 Melfort
2008 Lloydminster	2010 Moose Jaw
2012 Meadow Lake	2014 Prince Albert
2016 Estevan	2018 The Battlefords
2020 Cancelled	2023 Regina
2024 Lloydminster	2026 Flying Dust First Nation - City of Meadow Lake

== Sports ==
=== Summer sports ===
- Archery
- Athletics
- Baseball
- Basketball
- Football (called Soccer)
- Golf
- Canoeing (called Canoe/Kayak)
- Rugby sevens
- Softball
- Swimming
- Swimming Special Olympics
- Tennis
- Triathlon
- Volleyball
- Wheelchair basketball

=== Winter sports ===
- Alpine skiing
- Badminton
- Biathlon
- Bowling
- Bowling Special Olympics
- Cross-country skiing
- Curling
- Figure skating
- Gymnastics
- Ice hockey
- Judo
- Paralympic Nordic skiing
- Short track speed skating
- Snowboarding
- Table tennis
- Shooting
- Weightlifting
- Wrestling

== Participating teams ==
Nine district teams, each representing a different region of Saskatchewan, participate in each instalment of the games. Two of the teams (Regina and Saskatoon) represent the province's main urban centres, while the other seven teams represent a mix of urban and rural athletes. The district teams, ordered by population, and the cities they include are listed as follows.

- Team Saskatoon (Saskatoon) – 266,141
- Team Regina (Regina) – 226,404
- Team Lakeland (Melfort, Prince Albert) – 124,837
- Team Prairie Central (Humboldt, Martensville, Warman) – 118,729
- Team Rivers West (Lloydminster, Meadow Lake, North Battleford) – 110,432
- Team South West (Moose Jaw, Swift Current) – 101,114
- Team South East (Estevan, Weyburn) – 88,152
- Team Parkland Valley (Melville, Yorkton) – 60,718
- Team North (Flin Flon, La Ronge) – 35,988

== Medal tables ==
2012 Saskatchewan Summer Games

2012 Saskatchewan Summer Games medals
- Location: Meadow Lake

Highlights
- Most total medals: Regina (113)
- Most gold medals: Regina (39)
- Most silver medals: Regina (44)
- Most bronze medals: South West (30)

Rank	Nation	Gold	Silver	Bronze	Total
1	Regina	39	44	30	113
2	Saskatoon	29	21	18	68
3	Lakeland	24	21	16	61
4	Prairie Central	22	19	16	57
5	South East	20	25	27	72
6	South West	13	26	32	71
7	Rivers West*	12	13	21	46
8	North	8	2	2	12
9	Parkland Valley	7	6	9	22
Totals (9 entries)		174	177	171	522

2014 Saskatchewan Winter Games

2014 Saskatchewan Winter Games medals
- Location: Prince Albert

Highlights
- Most total medals: Regina (89)
- Most gold medals: Saskatoon (38)
- Most silver medals: Regina (30)
- Most bronze medals: Regina (31)

Rank	Nation	Gold	Silver	Bronze	Total
1	Saskatoon	38	25	24	87
2	Regina	28	30	31	89
3	Rivers West	22	24	21	67
4	Lakeland*	22	23	25	70
5	Prairie Central	14	7	15	36
6	South West	13	13	18	44
7	South East	10	15	12	37
8	Parkland Valley	4	6	3	13
9	North	2	5	3	10
Totals (9 entries)		153	148	152	453

Flag points winner: Regina

2016 Saskatchewan Summer Games

2016 Saskatchewan Summer Games medals
- Location: Estevan

Highlights
- Most total medals: Saskatoon (114)
- Most gold medals: Saskatoon (54)
- Most silver medals: Saskatoon (33)
- Most bronze medals: Saskatoon (27)

Rank	Nation	Gold	Silver	Bronze	Total
1	Saskatoon	54	33	27	114
2	Regina	21	31	22	74
3	Prairie Central	19	13	19	51
4	South West	17	18	15	50
5	South East*	16	14	23	53
6	Lakeland	10	8	11	29
7	Rivers West	6	12	8	26
8	North	4	3	7	14
9	Parkland Valley	3	13	16	32
Totals (9 entries)		150	145	148	443

Flag points winner: Saskatoon

2018 Saskatchewan Winter Games

2018 Saskatchewan Winter Games medals
- Location: The Battlefords

Highlights
- Most total medals: Saskatoon (108)
- Most gold medals: Saskatoon (37)
- Most silver medals: Saskatoon (41)
- Most bronze medals: Regina (32)

Rank	Nation	Gold	Silver	Bronze	Total
1	Saskatoon	37	41	30	108
2	Regina	32	25	32	89
3	Rivers West*	21	26	22	69
4	Prairie Central	19	21	18	58
5	Lakeland	18	6	15	39
6	South West	12	18	12	42
7	South East	10	8	15	33
8	North	5	6	6	17
9	Parkland Valley	5	4	6	15
Totals (9 entries)		159	155	156	470

Flag points winner: Saskatoon

2023 Saskatchewan Winter Games

2023 Saskatchewan Winter Games medals
- Location: Regina

Highlights
- Most total medals: Saskatoon (98)
- Most gold medals: Saskatoon (41)
- Most silver medals: Saskatoon (30)
- Most bronze medals: Saskatoon (27)

Rank	Nation	Gold	Silver	Bronze	Total
1	Saskatoon	41	30	27	98
2	Regina*	24	21	24	69
3	Prairie Central	21	14	16	51
4	South West	15	14	8	37
5	Rivers West	8	11	17	36
6	Parkland Valley	7	10	10	27
7	Lakeland	6	17	11	34
8	South East	5	7	8	20
9	North	3	0	2	5
Totals (9 entries)		130	124	123	377

Flag points winner: Saskatoon

2024 Saskatchewan Summer Games

2024 Saskatchewan Summer Games
- Host city: Lloydminster
- Athletes: 1476 from 9 teams
- Events: 14 sports
- Opening: July 21, 2024
- Closing: July 27, 2024
- Main venue: Centennial Civic Centre
- Website: Saskgames.ca

Summer

Winter

2024 Saskatchewan Summer Games medals
- Location: Lloydminster

Highlights
- Most total medals: Regina (111)
- Most gold medals: Regina (54)
- Most silver medals: Saskatoon (36)
- Most bronze medals: Regina (28); Saskatoon (28)

Number of athletes by team

Ranking	Team	Athletes
1	Saskatoon	208
2	Regina	203
3	Rivers West	185
4	Prairie Central	171
5	Lakeland	170
6	South East	165
7	South West	162
8	Parkland Valley	144
9	North	68

Rank	Nation	Gold	Silver	Bronze	Total
1	Regina	54	29	28	111
2	Saskatoon	31	36	28	95
3	South West	16	13	16	45
4	Prairie Central	8	8	8	24
5	Parkland Valley	7	13	13	33
6	South East	6	3	11	20
7	North	4	11	5	20
8	Lakeland	3	9	8	20
9	Rivers West*	2	11	13	26
Totals (9 entries)		131	133	130	394

Flag points winner: Regina

== See also ==
- Canada Games
  - Canada Summer Games
  - Canada Winter Games
- Western Canada Summer Games
- BC Games
  - BC Summer Games
  - BC Winter Games
- Alberta Winter Games
- Manitoba Games
- Ontario Games
- Quebec Games
