= BC Games Society =

Provincial crown corporation in British Columbia

- Company type: Crown Corporation
- Industry: Multi-sport event management
- Founded: 1977; 49 years ago
- Headquarters: Victoria, British Columbia, Canada
- Area served: British Columbia
- Key people: Jamey Paterson (Chairman); Alison Noble (President and CEO)
- Number of employees: 10 (January 2017)
- Website: www.bcgames.org

The BC Games Society is a provincial crown corporation in British Columbia created in 1977. The organization is the governing body responsible for the BC Summer Games and BC Winter Games, and manages the Team BC program at the Canada Games. Ron Butlin served as the first manager-director of the society from 1977 to 1987.

== Host cities ==
Year	BC Winter Games	BC Summer Games
Year	Host city	Host city
1978		Penticton
1979	Kamloops	Richmond
1980	Kimberley	Kelowna
1981	Prince George	Comox Valley
1982	Trail	Vernon
1983	Revelstoke	Maple Ridge
1984	Fort St. John	Burnaby
1985	Osoyoos/Oliver	Nanaimo
1986	Terrace	Cranbrook
1987	Fernie	Delta
1988	Dawson Creek	Greater Victoria
1989	Nelson	Surrey
1990	Penticton	Prince George
1991	Duncan/North Cowichan	Coquitlam
1992	Greater Vernon	Port Alberni
1993	Kitimat	Chilliwack
1994	Smithers	Kelowna
1995	Comox Valley	Penticton
1996	North Vancouver	Trail/Castlegar
1997	Campbell River	Burnaby
1998		Maple Ridge/Pitt Meadows
2000	Quesnel	Victoria
2002	Williams Lake	Nanaimo
2004	Port Alberni	Abbotsford
2006	Greater Trail	Kamloops
2008	Kimberley/Cranbrook	Kelowna
2010	Terrace	Township of Langley
2012	Greater Vernon	Surrey
2014	Mission	Nanaimo
2016	Penticton	Abbotsford
2018	Kamloops	Cowichan Valley
2020	Fort St. John	Cancelled due to COVID-19
2022	Greater Vernon	Prince George
2024	Quesnel	Maple Ridge
2026	Trail/Rossland	Kelowna

== Sports ==
=== Summer sports ===
- Athletics (including Special Olympics)
- Baseball
- Basketball
- Canoe/Kayak (including Para)
- Equestrian (including Para)
- Golf
- Lacrosse
- Rowing
- Rugby
- Sailing
- Soccer
- Softball
- Swimming (including Para and Special Olympics)
- Synchronised swimming
- Towed water sports
- Triathlon
- Volleyball
- Wrestling

=== Winter sports ===
- Archery
- Badminton
- Basketball-Special Olympics
- Basketball-Wheelchair
- Biathlon
- Curling
- Diving
- Figure skating (including Special Olympics)
- Gymnastics
- Judo
- Karate
- Netball
- Rhythmic gymnastics
- Ringette
- Skiing-Alpine
- Skiing-Cross Country (including Para)
- Skiing-Freestyle
- Snowboarding
- Speed skating

== Participating teams ==
Eight zones, each representing a different region of British Columbia, participate in each instalment of the games. The zones and the cities they include are listed as follows.

- Kootenays (Zone 1) – Castlegar, Cranbrook, Fernie, Grand Forks, Kimberley, Nelson, Rossland, Trail
- Thompson-Okanagan (Zone 2) – Armstrong, Enderby, Kamloops, Kelowna, Merritt, Peachland, Penticton, Revelstoke, Salmon Arm, Vernon
- Fraser Valley (Zone 3) – Abbotsford, Chilliwack, Langley, Maple Ridge, Pitt Meadows
- Fraser River (Zone 4) – Burnaby, Coquitlam, New Westminster, Port Coquitlam, Port Moody, Surrey, White Rock
- Vancouver-Coastal (Zone 5) – North Vancouver, Richmond, Vancouver
- Vancouver Island-Central Coast (Zone 6) – Campbell River, Courtenay, Duncan, Ladysmith, Nanaimo, Oak Bay, Port Alberni, Powell River, Victoria
- North West (Zone 7) – Prince Rupert, Terrace
- Cariboo-North East (Zone 8) – Dawson Creek, Fort Nelson, Fort St. John, Prince George, Quesnel, Williams Lake

== See also ==
- Canada Games
  - Canada Summer Games
  - Canada Winter Games
- BC Summer Games
- BC Winter Games
- Alberta Winter Games
- Saskatchewan Games
- Manitoba Games
- Games Ontario
- Quebec Games
- Western Canada Summer Games
