= BC Winter Games =

- Location of BC Winter Games
- Status: Active
- Genre: Multi-sport event
- Location: Various
- Country: Canada
- Inaugurated: 1979; 47 years ago
- Organizer: BC Games Society

The BC Winter Games are an amateur sporting event held in British Columbia, Canada on every other (even-numbered) year.

== History ==
The BC Winter Games date back to 1979 when the first Winter Games were hosted at Kamloops, British Columbia. The Games would continue and be hosted every year until 1997, when it was changed to every second year along with the BC Summer Games.

The 2022 BC Winter Games were held in Greater Vernon, BC from March 23 to 26, 2023.

The 2024 BC Winter Games were held in Quesnel, British Columbia, with cross-country and biathalon events held at Barkerville.

== Broadcast ==
In January 2016 it was announced that viaSport would be producing a daily three-minute video for the duration of the games for the 2016 year.

== Sponsored sports ==
The BC Winter Games brings both able-bodied and disabled sports to one grand event all in the name of sport and competition. The top three participants/teams of each sport receive a medal in an Olympic fashion.

While not all of the winter-related sports can be in the BC Winter Games, there is an application process for games that feel they have grown large enough in British Columbia to be a part of the Games.

=== Current winter sports ===
- Archery
- Badminton
- Biathlon
- Boxing
- Basketball - wheelchair
- Curling - boys and girls
- Curling - wheelchair
- Figure skating
- Gymnastics - artistic
- Ice hockey
- Judo
- Karate
- Netball
- Ringette
- Skiing - alpine
- Skiing - alpine (para)
- Skiing - cross-country
- Speed skating

== See also ==
- Canada Games
  - Canada Summer Games
  - Canada Winter Games
- Western Canada Summer Games
- BC Games
  - BC Summer Games
- Alberta Winter Games
- Saskatchewan Games
- Manitoba Games
- Ontario Games
- Quebec Games
