= Ontario Games =

Canadian multi-sport amateur event

- Location of Ontario Games
- Purpose: Multi-sport event
- Frequency: Every 2 years
- Inaugurated: 1970; 56 years ago Summer; Winter; Parasport; 55+ Summer; 55+ Winter
- Headquarters: Games Ontario, Toronto, Ontario, Canada
- Website: Official website ParaSport Ontario

The Ontario Games program is Ontario, Canada's largest multi-sport amateur event which involves hosting and organizing separate events for athletes aged 9–18 years, parasport athletes, and athletes 55 and older. The program is provided by the Government of Ontario's Ministry of Heritage, Sport, Tourism and Culture Industries. Games Ontario is the provincial crown corporation charged with organizing this multi-sport event under the title of "Ontario Games".

Beginning in 1970, the event acted as a showcase for amateur sport. Today the objectives of the event are also meant to provide developmental and competitive opportunities for Ontario's amateur athletes in order to help them prepare for future national and international competitions and help older adults remain active. The Ontario Games are the only multi-sport event of this calibre hosted in the province.

Events include: the Ontario Summer Games (OSG), the Ontario Winter Games (OWG), the Ontario 55+ Summer Games, the Ontario 55+ Winter Games, and the Ontario Parasport Games (OPG).

The most recent Ontario Summer Games (OSG) took place in 2022 in the City of Mississauga. The 2020 games which were previously postponed to 2021 were cancelled due to the COVID-19 pandemic.

The most recent Ontario Winter Games (OWG) were initially scheduled to take place from February 25–27 and March 3–6, 2022 in Renfrew County, Ontario, but were postponed due to COVID-19.

The Ontario ParaSport Games (OPG) took place in 2022 from May 13 to 15 in the City of Mississauga. The games were originally scheduled for 2021 but were postponed to 2022 due to the COVID-19 pandemic.

== History of the Ontario Games ==
The Ontario Games began as a multi-sport event in Ontario, Canada in 1970 and the event acted as a showcase for amateur sport. Today it is also designed to aid in the development of high performance amateur athletes and prepare them for both the national and international level of sports competition.

=== Editions ===
Edition	Year	Host city/Region	Dates
1	1970	Etobicoke	
2	1973	London	
3	1974	Sudbury	
4	1975	London	
5	1976	Ottawa/Carleton	
6	1977	Kitchener/Waterloo	
7	1980	Peterborough	
8	1982	Sarnia	
9	1983	Sudbury	
10	1986	Peterborough	
11	1988	Hamilton	
12	1990	Kitchener/Waterloo	
13	1992	Scarborough	
14	1994	Kingston/Nepean	
15	1996	London	
16	1998	Guelph	
17	2000	Durham	
18	2002	Kitchener/Waterloo	
19	2004	London	
20	2006	Ottawa	
21	2008	Ottawa	
22	2010	Sudbury	
23	2012	Toronto	
24	2014	Windsor	
25	2016	Mississauga	
26	2018	London	Thursday, August 2 - Sunday, August 5, 2018
-	2020	~~London~~	Canceled due to the COVID-19 pandemic
27	2022	Mississauga	Thursday, July 21 - Sunday, July 24, 2022
28	2024	London	Thursday, August 1 - Sunday, August 4, 2024
29	2026	Waterloo Region	August 2026
30	2028	TBD	2028

== Sports ==
=== Summer sports ===
There are more than 15 different sporting events included in the Ontario Summer Games. This includes: basketball, canoe kayak, field hockey, lacrosse (box and field), rugby, softball, table tennis and volleyball (indoor and beach).

=== Winter sports ===
The Ontario Winter Games is delivered by the Sport Alliance of Ontario. A total of 19 sports are included in the program:

- Alpine skiing
- Archery
- Gymnastics (Artistic)
- Badminton
- Biathlon
- Cross-country skiing
- Curling
- Fencing
- Figure skating
- Freestyle skiing
- Ice hockey
- Judo
- Wrestling
- Ringette
- Shooting
- Speed skating
- Squash
- Artistic swimming
  a.k.a. Synchronized Swimming
- Table tennis
- Wheelchair basketball

=== Parasports ===
The ParaSport games of Ontario are administered by ParaSport Ontario and currently includes the following 35 parasports:

- Alpine Skiing
- Amputee Hockey
- Archery
- Athletics
- Baseball
- Boccia
- Canoe / Kayak
- Circus Arts
- Cycling
- Dance
- Dragon Boat Racing
- Equestrian
- Fishing
- Goalball
- Golf
- Ice Skating
- Martial Arts
- Nordic Skiing
- Powerchair Hockey
- Powerlifting
- Rowing
- Running
- Sailing
- Sitting Volleyball
- Sledge Hockey
  a.k.a. Para ice hockey or sled hockey
- Soccer
- Swimming
- Table Tennis
- Waterskiing / Wakeboarding
- Wheelchair Basketball
- Wheelchair Curling
- Wheelchair Fencing
- Wheelchair Rugby
- Wheelchair Tennis
- Yoga

=== 55+ Summer sports ===
The Ontario 55+ Summer Games are organized in partnership with the Ontario Senior Games Association (OSGA) and have grown to include more than 1,400 participants competing in 19 sports, including:

- 5-Pin Bowling
- Bid Euchre
- Billiard
- Bocce
- Cribbage
- Cycling
- Darts
- Euchre
- Floor Shuffleboard
- Golf
- Pickleball
- Prediction Walking
- Slo-Pitch
- Swimming
- Tennis

=== 55+ Winter sports ===
The Ontario 55+ Winter Games were created to support and assist in the development of Ontario's active older adults in 10 different sports. As of 2017 there were ten main areas of competition with each area further broken down into specific competitive events. Sports include:

- Alpine Skiing - ages 55+, 65+, 75+
- Badminton - ages 55+, 65+
- Curling
- Duplicate Bridge
- Ice Hockey - ages 55+, 65+
- Nordic Skiing - ages 55+
- Skating - ages 55+, 75+
- Table Tennis - ages 55+, 65+
- Ten Pin Bowling - ages 55+
- Volleyball - ages 55+, 65+

== Ontario Summer Games ==
=== 2020 Ontario Summer Games ===
Cancelled

London, Ontario had been chosen to host the 2020 Ontario Summer Games (OSG), but due to the COVID-19 pandemic, the event was cancelled. The plan had been to postpone the 2020 OSG until 2021 but again, due to the COVID-19 pandemic, they were cancelled and then scrapped altogether.

=== 2021 Ontario Summer Games ===
Cancelled

The 2021 Ontario Summer Games were scheduled to be hosted as a result of the previous cancellation of the 2020 Ontario Summer Games due to the COVID-19 pandemic, but again, due to the COVID-19 pandemic, they were cancelled and then scrapped altogether.

=== 2022 Ontario Summer Games ===
The 2022 Ontario Summer Games (OSG) took place from July 21 to 24 in Mississauga with more than 3,500 athletes.

=== 2024 Ontario Summer Games ===
The 2024 Ontario Summer Games (OSG) took place from August 1 to August 4 in London with more than 3,500 athletes, 2,500 of them being youth athletes aged 12-18.

=== 2026 Ontario Summer Games ===
The 2026 Ontario Summer Games will take place from July 30 to August 2, with 4,200 athletes aged 12-18.

== Ontario Winter Games ==
=== 2022 Ontario Winter Games ===
Postponed

The 2022 Ontario Winter Games (OWG) were given the go ahead after a lot of consideration due to the COVID-19 pandemic. The games were to be hosted by Renfrew County and were scheduled to be from February 25–27, 2022 and March 3–6, 2022 but were postponed due to COVID-19.

27 sports will be a part of the 2022 OWG program. An estimated 3,500 athletes, coaches, officials and dignitaries are expected to attend.

== Ontario ParaSport Games ==
The ParaSport games of Ontario are administered by ParaSport Ontario.

=== 2021 Ontario ParaSport Games ===
Cancelled

The 2021 Ontario ParaSport Games (OPG) were postponed to 2022 due to the COVID-19 pandemic.

=== 2022 Ontario ParaSport Games ===
The City of Mississauga hosted the 2022 Ontario ParaSport Games (OPG) after the games, originally scheduled for 2021, were postponed to 2022 due to the COVID-19 pandemic. The Ontario ParaSport Games ran from May 13 to 15, 2022.

== Ontario 55+ Summer Games ==
The Ontario 55+ Summer Games were first held in 1986 in the City of Kitchener and were originally known as Actifest until 2010. The Games, which are organized by OGSA, are held biennially and feature a variety of competitive and recreational summer sports for participants aged 55 and older.

Established as part of the broader OSGA initiative, the Summer Games provide a structured pathway for older Ontarians to participate in district-level competitions, qualify for regional and provincial championships, and potentially advance to the Canada 55+ Games.

In February 2019, the City of Peterborough was selected to host the Games scheduled for August 2020. However, due to the COVID-19 pandemic, the event was postponed to 2021. In June 2021, it was announced that the Games would not proceed that year either, and Peterborough was offered the opportunity to host in 2022 instead.

=== List of Ontario 55+ Summer Games ===
Edition	Year	Host city/Region	Dates
1	1996	Kitchener	August 25–27, 1986
2	1988	Brampton	August 29–31, 1988
3	1990	London	August 7–9, 1990
4	1992	Hamilton	August 24–26, 1992
5	1994	Sudbury	August 22–24, 1994
6	1996	Richmond Hill	August 26–28, 1996
7	1998	Windsor	August 18–21, 1998
8	2000	Ottawa-Carleton Region	August 8–10, 2000
9	2002	Kingston	August 13–15, 2002
10	2004	St. Catharines	August 16–18, 2004
11	2006	Hamilton	August 14–16, 2006
12	2008	London	August 12–14, 2008
13	2010	Oshawa	August 10–12, 2010
14	2012	Brampton	August 14–16, 2012
15	2014	Windsor/Amherstburg	August 19–21, 2014
16	2016	Midland	August 9–11, 2016
17	2018	Mississauga	August 10–12, 2018
18	2022	Peterborough	August 9–11, 2022
19	2023	Brantford/County of Brant	August 9–11, 2023
20	2024	Sudbury	August 5–7, 2025

== Ontario 55+ Winter Games ==
In 2000, Winterfest was launched to complement the Summer Games, then known as Actifest. The event was officially renamed the Ontario 55+ Winter Games beginning with the 2011 edition. Held biennially in alternating years with the Summer Games, the Winter Games offer a provincial platform for older adults to engage in a wide range of winter sports and recreational activities tailored to various skill levels and interests.

Participants typically qualify through district-level competitions before advancing to the provincial Games, with select events serving as qualifiers for the Canada 55+ Games.

The 2021 Ontario 55+ Winter Games, originally scheduled to take place in Brantford and the County of Brant from February 11–13, 2021, were ultimately cancelled due to the COVID-19 pandemic.

=== List of Ontario 55+ Summer Games ===
Edition	Year	Host city/Region	Dates
1	2000	Collingwood	March 5–7, 2000
2	2003	London	February 16–18, 2003
3	2005	Barrie	February 6–9, 2005
4	2007	Brockville	February 14–16, 2007
5	2009	Brockville	February 11–13, 2009
6	2011	Haliburton	February 15–17, 2011
7	2013	Huntsville	February 26–28, 2013
8	2015	Haliburton	February 17–19, 2015
9	2017	Cobourg	February 21–23, 2017
10	2019	Huntsville	March 5–7, 2019
11	2024	Orillia	February 6–8, 2024

== See also ==
- Canada Games
  - Canada Summer Games
  - Canada Winter Games
- Western Canada Summer Games
- BC Games
  - BC Summer Games
  - BC Winter Games
- Alberta Winter Games
- Saskatchewan Games
- Manitoba Games
- Quebec Games
