= 2026–27 SIJHL season =

26th season of the SIJHL

- League: SIJHL
- Sport: Junior ice hockey
- Duration: Regular season September–March; Playoffs; March–April
- Games: 168
- Teams: 7
- Streaming partner: sijhl.tv

Seasons
- ← 2025–26 2027–28 →

The 2026–27 season is the 26th year of the Superior International Junior Hockey League (SIJHL).

There were several head coaching changes throughout the league. The Kam River Fighting Walleye appointed Ryan Carlson as general manager and head coach. The Dryden Ice Dogs appointed Delroy Montaque as general manager and head coach. The Red Lake Miners appointed Kurt Walsten as general manager and head coach. The Sioux Lookout Bombers appointed Joel Litt-Jukes as head coach.

== Sources ==
- Dunick, Leith (23 April 2026). "Wintoneak won't return behind Fighting Walleye bench". TBNewsWatch.com. Dougall Media.
- Dunick, Leith (24 April 2026). "Wintoneak says lack of communication led to firing". TBNewsWatch.com. Dougall Media.
- Davidson, Tim (18 June 2026). "Ice dogs looking for new GM and head coach". Your Kenora. Acadia Broadcasting.
- "VIDEO: Kam River Fighting Walleye hire new head coach". TBNewsWatch.com. Dougall Media. 22 July 2026.
