= 2025–26 SIJHL season =

25th season of the SIJHL

- League: SIJHL
- Sport: Ice hockey
- Duration: Regular season September–March; Playoffs; March–April
- Games: 168
- Teams: 7
- Streaming partner: sijhl.tv

Bill Salonen Cup
- Champions: Thunder Bay North Stars
- Runners-up: Fort Frances Lakers

Seasons
- ← 2024–25 2026–27 →

The 2025–26 SIJHL season is the 25th season of the Superior International Junior Hockey League (SIJHL).

The field of competition was reduced to seven teams as the Kenora Islanders, which debuted as an expansion franchise in 2023, remained indefinitely suspended. The Islanders suspended operations midseason in January 2025 and announced they were seeking a new owner to take over the franchise, citing a conflict with the SIJHL board of governors.

The league announced that it was installing a multi-angle, offline video review system in all seven arenas, which would be used by officials and coaches during live gameplay. The system provided three camera angles, overhead and both goal lines, frame-by-frame navigation, video annotation tools and a bench-side iPad flagging system.

Dean Thibodeau was appointed as the new league commissioner following the departure of Darrin Nicholas, who held the role since 2020.

Bill Salonen, general manager of the 2001–02 Dryden Ice Dogs, and namesake of the SIJHL championship trophy, died on 18 October 2025 at the age of 90.

== Regular season ==
Teams played 48 regular season games, including 8 games against each other team.

Standings
Team	GP	W	L	OTL	SOL	Pts
Fort Frances Lakers	48	37	7	2	2	78
Dryden Ice Dogs	48	34	10	3	1	72
Thunder Bay North Stars	48	30	14	3	1	64
Kam River Fighting Walleye	48	29	13	3	3	64
Sioux Lookout Bombers	48	24	20	2	2	52
Ironwood Lumberjacks	48	9	37	1	1	20
Red Lake Miners	48	5	42	0	1	11

Source: "2025–26 Superior International Junior Hockey League standings". hockeydb.com.

== Post-season ==
2026 SIJHL playoffs
Bill Salonen Cup

Tournament details
- Dates: March–April
- Teams: 7
- Defending champions: Kam River Fighting Walleye

Final positions
- Champions: Thunder Bay North Stars (6th title)
- Runners-up: Fort Frances Lakers
- Semifinalists: Kam River Fighting Walleye; Dryden Ice Dogs

Tournament statistics
- Games played: 31
- Goals scored: 212 (6.84 per game)

Awards
- Playoff MVP: Lucas Bertolin

Official website
- 2026 SIJHL playoffs

Each round of the playoffs is a single-elimination best-of-seven series. The first-place Fort Frances Lakers had a bye in the first round. The third-place Thunder Bay North Stars defeated the Lakers in the final.

Quarterfinals
Kam River	4
Sioux Lookout	1
Dryden	4
Red Lake	0
Thunder Bay	4
Ironwood	0

Semifinals
Fort Frances	4
Kam River	2
Dryden	1
Thunder Bay	4

Finals
Fort Frances	3
Thunder Bay	4

Source: "2026 SIJHL playoff results". sijhlhockey.com. Superior International Junior Hockey League.

== Sources ==
- "SIJHL Eyes 25th Anniversary Season". sijhlhockey.com (Press release). Superior International Junior Hockey League. 24 July 2025.
- Thoms, Randy (28 July 2025). "SIJHL plans for return of all-star game". CKDR. Acadia Broadcasting.
