= 2022–23 SIJHL season =

21st season of the SIJHL

- League: SIJHL
- Sport: Ice hockey
- Duration: Regular season September–March; Postseason; March–May
- Games: 54
- Teams: 7
- Streaming partner: sijhl.tv
- League champions: Kam River Fighting Walleye
- Runners-up: Thunder Bay North Stars

Seasons
- ← 2021–22 2023–24 →

The 2022–23 SIJHL season is the 21st season of the Superior International Junior Hockey League (SIJHL). The league's 7 teams each played a 54-game regular season schedule from September 2022 – March 2023. The Kam River Fighting Walleye won the league championship Bill Salonen Cup after defeating the Thunder Bay North Stars in seven games in the final round of the playoffs.

== League changes ==
The Sioux Lookout Bombers joined the league as an expansion team. The Thief River Falls Norskies ceased operations during the 2021–22 SIJHL season and did not return for the 2022–23 SIJHL season.

== Regular season ==
Teams played a 54-game schedule. The Kam River Fighting Walleye finished the regular season in 1st place.

Standings
Team	GP	W	L	OTL	SOL	Pts
Kam River Fighting Walleye	54	40	11	1	1	83
Dryden Ice Dogs	54	37	15	1	0	76
Sioux Lookout Bombers	54	29	20	3	0	63
Thunder Bay North Stars	54	27	20	3	1	61
Red Lake Miners	54	22	25	3	2	51
Wisconsin Lumberjacks	54	18	28	3	3	44
Fort Frances Lakers	54	9	41	1	0	22

== Post-season ==
2023 SIJHL playoffs
Bill Salonen Cup

Tournament details
- Dates: 23 March – 21 April
- Teams: 7

Final positions
- Champions: Kam River Fighting Walleye
- Runners-up: Thunder Bay North Stars
- Semifinalists: Dryden Ice Dogs; Wisconsin Lumberjacks

Tournament statistics
- Games played: 36
- Goals scored: 267 (7.42 per game)
- Attendance: 23,934 (665 per game)

Official website
- 2023 SIJHL playoffs

The Kam River Fighting Walleye won the Bill Salonen Cup league championship after defeating the Thunder Bay North Stars in game 7 of the final round of the playoffs.

Quarterfinals
Sioux Lookout	3
Wisconsin	4
Dryden	4
Fort Frances	1
Thunder Bay	4
Red Lake	1

Semifinals
Wisconsin	1
Kam River	4
Dryden	3
Thunder Bay	4

Finals
Kam River	4
Thunder Bay	3

The Kam River Fighting Walleye went on to compete in the 2023 Centennial Cup national championship tournament in Portage la Prairie, Manitoba.

== See also ==
- 2023 Centennial Cup
- Canadian Junior Hockey League
- Hockey Canada
- Hockey Northwestern Ontario
- Superior International Junior Hockey League

== Sources ==
- "2022-23 SIJHL playoff results". hockeydb.com.
- Dunick, Leith (23 April 2021). "Sioux Lookout returning to SIJHL". TBNewsWatch.com. Dougall Media.
- Dunick, Leith (12 July 2022). "Norskies bow out of SIJHL". TBNewsWatch.com. Dougall Media.
- Dunick, Leith (22 October 2022). "Bombers looking to build an SIJHL dynasty". NWONewsWatch.com. Dougall Media.
- Laskaris, Adam (2 September 2022). "Alberta junior hockey team blows out opponent by over 20 goals". dailyhive.com.
- Fleury, Clint (23 September 2022). "Dryden GM continues to support the Ice Dogs". NWONewsWatch.com. Dougall Media.
- Dunick, Leith (17 July 2023). "Fighting Walleye searching for new head coach". TBNewsWatch.com. Dougall Media.
- Russon, Randy (19 April 2022). "Comment: Plaudits for the SIJHL as a beckoning junior hockey option". saultthisweek.com. Postmedia.
- "Will it be the Fighting Walleye or the North Stars? New SIJHL champion to be crowned tonight". CBC News. CBC/Radio-Canada. 3 May 2023.
- Forbes, Ryan (16 September 2022). "SIJHL still hoping to bring team to Kenora". Kenora Online. Acadia Broadcasting.
