= 2021–22 SIJHL season =

20th season of the SIJHL

- 20th anniversary commemorative logo
- League: SIJHL
- Sport: Ice hockey
- Duration: Regular season September–March; Postseason; March–April
- Games: 48
- Teams: 7
- Streaming partner: sijhl.tv
- League champions: Red Lake Miners
- Runners-up: Kam River Fighting Walleye

Seasons
- ← 2020–21 2022–23 →

The 2021–22 SIJHL season was the 20th season of the Superior International Junior Hockey League.

== League changes ==
The Thief River Falls Norskies ceased operations mid-season.

Due to scheduling difficulties, Hockey Canada cancelled the 2022 Dudley Hewitt Cup regional championship between the SIJHL, Northern Ontario Junior Hockey League and Ontario Junior Hockey League, and invited the winners from each league to the 2022 Centennial Cup national championship tournament in Estevan, Saskatchewan.

The league commemorated the 20th anniversary of its inception with a newly designed logo.

== Regular season ==
The regular season schedule called for each of the 7 teams to play 48 games, including 4 home games and 4 away games against each other team. Due to the midseason departure of the Thief River Falls Norskies, the remaining teams played between 37 and 45 regular season games.

Standings
Team	GP	W	L	OTL	SOL	Pts
Kam River Fighting Walleye	44	35	7	2	0	72
Red Lake Miners	37	28	6	2	1	59
Dryden Ice Dogs	45	26	15	3	1	56
Thunder Bay North Stars	41	21	16	3	1	46
Wisconsin Lumberjacks	43	16	25	1	1	34
Thief River Falls Norskies	21	5	15	0	1	11
Fort Frances Lakers	41	5	35	1	0	11

== Post-season ==
2022 SIJHL playoffs
Bill Salonen Cup

Tournament details
- Dates: 29 March – 30 April
- Teams: 7

Final positions
- Champions: Red Lake Miners
- Runners-up: Kam River Fighting Walleye
- Semifinalists: Thunder Bay North Stars; Dryden Ice Dogs

Tournament statistics
- Games played: 22
- Goals scored: 149 (6.77 per game)
- Attendance: 15,062 (685 per game)

Official website
- 2022 SIJHL playoffs

The second place Red Lake Miners won the league championship Bill Salonen Cup for the first time in its 9-year history, after defeating the Kam River Fighting Walleye in game 6 of the final, and went on to compete for the 2022 Centennial Cup national championship.

Quarterfinals
Dryden	3
Fort Frances	0
Wisconsin	0
Thunder Bay	3

Semifinals
Dryden	2
Red Lake	4
Kam River	4
Thunder Bay	0

Finals
Red Lake	4
Kam River	2

In previous years, the SIJHL champions would go on to compete with the champions of the Northern Ontario Junior Hockey League and the Ontario Junior Hockey League for the Dudley Hewitt Cup regional championship, with the winner advancing to the national championship tournament to play for the Centennial Cup. In 2022, due to scheduling difficulties, Hockey Canada decided not to hold regional championships, and instead expanded the national tournament to include teams from each of the 9 leagues.

At the nationals, the Red Lake Miners were eliminated from contention after losing to the Brooks Bandits of the AJHL (11–2), Pickering Panthers of the OJHL (9–2), Collège Français de Longueuil of the QJHL (6–1), and Estevan Bruins of the SJHL (6–2). The final playoff round was between the Brooks Bandits and the Pickering Panthers, with the Brooks Bandits winning by a score of 4–1.

== See also ==
- 2022 Centennial Cup
- Canadian Junior Hockey League
- Hockey Canada
- Hockey Northwestern Ontario
- Superior International Junior Hockey League

== Sources ==
- "2021–22 SIJHL regular season standings". hockeydb.com.
- "2021–22 SIJHL playoff results". hockeydb.com.
- "SIJHL announces 2021–22 20th anniversary season schedule". sijhlhockey.com (Press release). 9 August 2021.
- "SIJHL doles out 2021–22 season awards". sijhlhockey.com (Press release). 5 April 2022.
- Laskaris, Sam (13 September 2021). "Ice Dogs gearing up to host Truth and Reconciliation game in Dryden". Windspeaker.com. Aboriginal Multi-Media Society.
- Dunick, Leith (12 July 2022). "Norskies bow out of SIJHL". tbnewswatch.com. Dougall Media.
- Russon, Randy (21 December 2021). "Fighting Walleye of Kam River are in command atop the standings of the SIJHL". saultthisweek.com. Postmedia.
- "SIJHL welcomes Sioux Lookout Bombers". cjhlhockey.com (Press release). 22 April 2021.
- Laughlin, Ryan (9 March 2018). "Growing the game: new junior hockey team sees early success". valleynewslive.com. Gray Local Media.
- Russon, Randy (19 April 2022). "Comment: Plaudits for the SIJHL as a beckoning junior hockey option". saultthisweek.com. Postmedia.
- Brody, Tim. "Sioux Lookout Bombers join SIJHL". siouxbulletin.com.
- Forbes, Ryan. "SIJHL still hoping to bring team to Kenora". Kenora Online. Acadia Broadcasting.
- Villagracia, Reuben (18 August 2021). "Teleco Cup hockey tourney returns". The Chronicle-Journal.
- "SIJHL announces return to play". cjhlhockey.com (Press release). 28 January 2022.
- Jeffrey, Kevin (12 August 2021). "Fighting Walleye First Season: Take Two". Country 105. Acadia Broadcasting.
- "Road to the 2022 Centennial Cup: Red Lake Miners". Hockey Canada.
- Dunick, Leith (27 March 2022). "Fighting Walleye close out season with win over Stars". TBNewsWatch.com. Dougall Media.
- Kowal, Nolan (17 May 2022). "Centennial Cup Preview: Red Lake Miners". DiscoverEstevan.
- Mahon, Rob (18 May 2021). "Estevan Bruins To Remain Host For 2022 Centennial Cup". discoverestevan.com.
