= 2015 Dudley Hewitt Cup =

Central Region Jr A Championship

Tournament details
- Venue: Memorial Sports Centre in Fort Frances, Ontario
- Host team: Fort Frances Lakers

Final positions
- Champions: Soo Thunderbirds
- Runners-up: Fort Frances Lakers

Tournament statistics
- Games played: 8

The 2015 Dudley Hewitt Cup was the 44th Central Canadian Jr A Ice Hockey championship for the Canadian Junior Hockey League. The winners went on to represent the central region in the 2015 Royal Bank Cup in Portage la Prairie, Manitoba.

== Teams ==
- Fort Frances Lakers (Host and SIJHL Champions)

Regular Season:
Playoffs: Defeated Thunder Bay North Stars 4-1, Defeated Dryden Ice Dogs 4-2 to win the league

- Dryden Ice Dogs (SIJHL Runner-up)

Regular Season: 30-21-5 (3rd in SIJHL)
Playoffs: Defeated Minnesota Iron Rangers 4-2, Defeated by Fort Frances Lakers 2-4.

- Toronto Patriots (OJHL Champions)

Regular Season: 35-18-0-1 (1st in OJHL South Division)
Playoffs: Defeated St. Michael's Buzzers 4-0, Defeated Oakville Blades 4-1, Defeated Toronto Jr. Canadiens 4-2, Defeated Kingston Voyageurs 4-3 to win the league.

- Soo Thunderbirds (NOJHL Champions)

Regular Season:38–11–2–1 (1st in NOJHL West Division)

Playoffs: Defeated Blind River Beavers 4-0, Defeated Elliot Lake Wildcats 4-1, Defeated Cochrane Crunch 4-1 to win the league.

== Tournament ==
=== Standing ===
DHC Round Robin
Rank	Team	League	W-OTW-L-OTL	GF	GA	Pts.
1	Soo Thunderbirds	NOJHL	2-0-0-1	17	8	7
2	Toronto Patriots	OJHL	1-1-0-1	11	5	6
3	Fort Frances Lakers	Host	1-1-1-0	10	11	4
4	Dryden Ice Dogs	SIJHL	0-0-3-0	4	19	0

=== Round Robin ===
Round Robin results
Game	Away team	Score	Home team	Score	Notes
1	Soo	8	Dryden	1	
2	Toronto	1	Fort Frances	2	OT
3	Toronto	6	Dryden	0	
4	Fort Frances	3	Soo	6	
5	Soo	3	Toronto	4	2OT
6	Dryden	3	Fort Frances	4	

=== Semifinal and final ===
Game	Away team	Score	Home team	Score	Notes
SF	Fort Frances	6	Toronto	4	
F	Fort Frances	2	Soo	3	
