= 2013–14 SIJHL season =

- League: Superior International Junior Hockey League
- Sport: Hockey
- Duration: Regular season 2013-09-20 – 2014-03-12; Playoffs; 2014-03-14 – 2014-04-23
- Teams: 6
- Finals champions: Fort Frances Lakers

SIJHL seasons
- 2012–13 2014–15

The 2013–14 SIJHL season was the 13th season of the Superior International Junior Hockey League (SIJHL). The seven teams of the SIJHL played 56-game schedules.

Come February, the top teams of the league will play down for the Bill Salonen Cup, the SIJHL championship. The winner of the Bill Salonen Cup will compete in the Central Canadian Junior "A" championship, the Dudley Hewitt Cup. If successful against the winners of the Ontario Junior Hockey League and Northern Ontario Junior Hockey League, the champion would then move on to play in the Canadian Junior Hockey League championship, the 2014 Royal Bank Cup.

== Changes ==
- Sioux Lookout Flyers do not return.
- Wisconsin Wilderness leave for North American Hockey League.
- Expansion granted to English River Miners of Ear Falls, Ontario.
- Expansion granted to Wisconsin Wilderness of Spooner, Wisconsin.

== Current Standings ==
Note: GP = Games played; W = Wins; L = Losses; OTL = Overtime losses; SL = Shootout losses; GF = Goals for; GA = Goals against; PTS = Points; x = clinched playoff berth; y = clinched division title; z = clinched conference title

Standings
Team	Centre	W–L–OTL	GF–GA	Points
Fort Frances Lakers	Fort Frances, Ontario	46-6-4	295-150	96
Thunder Bay North Stars	Thunder Bay, Ontario	40-10-5	253-180	85
Minnesota Iron Rangers	Hoyt Lakes, Minnesota	36-14-6	237-168	76
English River Miners	Ear Falls, Ontario	21-30-5	185-228	47
Dryden Ice Dogs	Dryden, Ontario	21-30-5	210-273	47
Wisconsin Wilderness	Spooner, Wisconsin	5-51-0	146-327	10

Teams listed on the official league website.

Standings listed on official league website.

== 2014 Bill Salonen Cup Playoffs ==
Quarter-finals
4	English River	4
5	Dryden	2
3	Minnesota	4
6	Wisconsin	0

Semi-finals
1	Fort Frances	4
4	English River	0
2	Thunder Bay	2
3	Minnesota	4

Bill Salonen Cup Finals
1	Fort Frances	4
3	Minnesota	3

=== Super Series ===
Winner gets choice of opponent in semi-finals. Two-game goal total series. If a draw after two games, the series goes to sudden death shootout.

Super Series
1	Fort Frances (1-1)	6
2	Thunder Bay (1-1)	4

Playoff results are listed on the official league website.

== Dudley Hewitt Cup Championship ==
Hosted by the Wellington Dukes in Wellington, Ontario. Fort Frances Lakers represented the SIJHL and lost in the semi-final.

Round Robin

Toronto Lakeshore Patriots (OJHL) 4 - Fort Frances Lakers 1
Wellington Dukes (OJHL) 3 - Fort Frances Lakers 0
Fort Frances Lakers 6 - Kirkland Lake Gold Miners (NOJHL) 3

Semi-final

Toronto Lakeshore Patriots (OJHL) 6 - Fort Frances Lakers 0

== Scoring leaders ==
Note: GP = Games played; G = Goals; A = Assists; Pts = Points; PIM = Penalty minutes

Player	Team	GP	G	A	Pts	PIM
Lucas Debenedet	Fort Frances	56	48	64	112	18
Daniel Del Paggio	Thunder Bay	51	36	69	105	42
Lyndon Lipinski	Fort Frances	56	39	52	91	36
Mason Meyer	Fort Frances	55	40	50	90	37
Zach Grzelewski	Thunder Bay	53	43	36	79	26
Matthias Gardiman	Thunder Bay	52	31	46	77	4
Dane Feeney	Dryden	55	30	36	66	51
John Morales	English River	55	30	32	62	75
Trevor Hoth	Minnesota	54	35	23	58	47
Vincent Currao	English River	53	22	34	56	84

== Leading goaltenders ==
Note: GP = Games played; Mins = Minutes played; W = Wins; L = Losses: OTL = Overtime losses; SL = Shootout losses; GA = Goals Allowed; SO = Shutouts; GAA = Goals against average

Player	Team	GP	Mins	W	L	SOL	GA	SO	Sv%	GAA
Devin Tappenden	Fort Frances	14	823:53	11	3	0	31	0	0.922	2.26
Jordan Cartney	Fort Frances	31	1718:15	24	4	1	71	3	0.911	2.48
Eric Mann	Thunder Bay	35	1816:30	21	5	4	89	1	0.909	2.94
Greg Harney	English River	28	1525:57	9	16	1	88	3	0.904	3.46
Alex Reichle	Minnesota	32	1752:55	18	8	4	85	1	0.902	2.91

== Players selected in 2014 NHL entry draft ==
To be decided after season concludes.

== Awards ==
- Player of the Year - Daniel Del Paggio (Thunder Bay)
- Goalie of the Year - Eric Mann (Thunder Bay)
- Defenceman of the Year - Austin Frank (Minnesota)
- Rookie of the Year - Lucas Debenedet (Fort Frances)
- Most Improved Player - Mason Meyer (Fort Frances)
- Most Sportsmanlike Player - Matthias Gardiman (Thunder Bay)
- Best Defensive Forward - Jonathon Losurdo (Minnesota)
- Coach of the Year - Wayne Strachan (Fort Frances)
- First All-Star Team - Lucas Debenedet (Fort Frances), Mason Meyer (Fort Frances), Daniel Del Paggio (Thunder Bay), Cody Wickstrom (Fort Frances), Austin Frank (Minnesota), Eric Mann (Fort Frances)
- Second All-Star Team - Lyndon Lipinski (Fort Frances), Matthias Gardiman (Thunder Bay), Zach Grzelewski (Thunder Bay), Tim Kavanaugh (Dryden), Tim Cavar (Thunder Bay), Jordan Cartney (Fort Frances)

== See also ==
- 2014 Royal Bank Cup
- Dudley Hewitt Cup
- Ontario Junior Hockey League
- Northern Ontario Junior Hockey League
- Greater Ontario Junior Hockey League
- 2013 in ice hockey
- 2014 in ice hockey

Preceded by 2012–13 SIJHL season	SIJHL seasons	Succeeded by 2014–15 SIJHL season
