= 2023 Centennial Cup =

Ice hockey national championship

2023 National championship
Centennial Cup

Tournament details
- City: Portage la Prairie
- Venue: Stride Place
- Dates: 11–21 May 2023
- Teams: 10
- Host team: Portage Terriers

Final positions
- Champions: Brooks Bandits
- Runners-up: Battlefords North Stars

Tournament statistics
- Games played: 25

Awards
- MVP: Aiden Fink

Official website
- Hockey Canada

The 2023 Centennial Cup was the 51st annual Canadian Junior Hockey League (CJHL) Junior A national championship tournament for the 2022–23 season. The tournament took place at Stride Place in Portage la Prairie, Manitoba from May 11 to 21, 2023. The competition included the championship teams from the nine leagues that collectively make up the CJHL.

The Portage Terriers and the City of Portage la Prairie had been selected to host the 2020 Centennial Cup tournament, which was cancelled due to public health restrictions related to the COVID-19 pandemic. The team had previously hosted, and won, the 2015 Royal Bank Cup, as the tournament was then known. Multiple corporate sponsors, including the title sponsor, Tim Hortons, withdrew their support for the tournament in response to the Hockey Canada sexual assault scandal.

== Competition ==
The tournament included the championship teams from each of the 9 leagues that collectively make up the Canadian Junior Hockey League and the hosting Portage Terriers.

=== Brooks Bandits ===
The Brooks Bandits qualified as the Inter Pipeline Cup champions of the Alberta Junior Hockey League.

Regular season: 53-5-1-1 (1st in AJHL)
Playoffs: Defeated Okotoks Oilers 4-2, Defeated Blackfalds Bulldogs 4-0, Defeated Spruce Grove Saints 4-1;

=== Battlefords North Stars ===
The Battlefords North Stars qualified as the Canterra Seeds Cup champions of the Saskatchewan Junior Hockey League.

Regular season: 48-5-2-1 (1st in SJHL)
Playoffs: Defeated Weyburn Red Wings 4-1, Defeated Melfort Mustangs 4-0, Defeated Flin Flon Bombers 4-0;

=== Steinbach Pistons ===
The Steinbach Pistons qualified as the Turnbull Cup champions of the Manitoba Junior Hockey League.

Regular season: 42-15-1 (2nd in MJHL)
Playoffs: Defeated Winkler Flyers 4-3, Defeated Swan Valley Stampeders 4-2 Defeated Virden Oil Capitals 4–1

=== Portage Terriers ===
The Portage Terriers of the MJHL were guaranteed a place in the tournament by virtue of being the host team.

Regular season: 43-11-1-3 (1st in MJHL)
Playoffs: Defeated Niverville Nighthawks 4-1, defeated by Virden Oil Capitals 3-4;

=== Kam River Fighting Walleye ===
The Kam River Fighting Walleye qualified as the Bill Salonen Cup champions of the Superior International Junior Hockey League.

Regular season: 40-11-1-1 (1st in SIJHL)
Playoffs: Defeated Wisconsin Lumberjacks 4-1, Defeated Thunder Bay North Stars 4–3

=== Timmins Rock ===
The Timmins Rock qualified as the Copeland Cup champions of the Northern Ontario Junior Hockey League.

Regular season: 45-8-3-2 (1st in NOJHL)
Playoffs: Defeated French River Rapids 4-1, defeated Powassan Voodoos 4-0, defeated Soo Thunderbirds 4-2;

=== Collingwood Blues ===
The Collingwood Blues qualified as the Buckland Cup champions of the Ontario Junior Hockey League.

Regular season: 44-9-0-1 (2nd in OJHL)
Playoffs: Defeated Stouffville Spirit 4-0, Defeated Milton Menace 4-0, Defeated Burlington Cougars 4-1, Defeated Trenton Golden Hawks 4–1

=== Ottawa Jr. Senators ===
The Ottawa Jr. Senators qualified as the Bogart Cup champions of the Central Canada Hockey League.

Regular season: 42-8-3-2 (1st in CCHL)
Playoffs: Defeated Cornwall Colts 4-1, Defeated Brockville Braves 4-1, Defeated Smiths Falls Bears 4–3

=== Terrebonne Cobras ===
The Terrebonne Cobras qualified as the NAPA Cup champions of the Ligue de Hockey Junior AAA du Québec.

Regular season: 42-5-0-1 (1st in LHJAAAQ)
Playoffs: Defeated Joliette Predateurs 4-0, Defeated Princeville Titans 4-1, Defeated Cégep Beauce-Appalaches Condors 4-3;

=== Yarmouth Mariners ===
The Yarmouth Mariners qualified as Metalfab Cup champions of the Maritime Hockey League.

Regular season: 41-9-2-0 (1st in MHL)
Playoffs: Defeated Pictou County Weeks Crushers 4-0, Defeated Truro Bearcats 4-0, Defeated Edmundston Blizzard 4-0;

== Map of competing teams ==
Canadian Junior Hockey League

== Round Robin ==
The top 3 teams from each group advanced to the playoffs, and the 1st place teams in each group had a bye to the semifinals.

	Group A	BB	OJS	YM	CT	TR
1	Brooks Bandits		5-1	7-2	6-1	9-0
2	Ottawa Jr. Senators	1-5		4-3	2-1	1-2
3	Yarmouth Mariners	2-7	3-4		3-2	3-4
4	Cobras de Terrebonne	1-6	1-2	2-3		2-1
5	Timmins Rock	0-9	2-1	4-3	1-2	

	Group B	BNS	PT	CB	SP	KFW
1	Battlefords North Stars		3-2	1-3	3-1	4-1
2	Portage Terriers	2-3		4-3	4-2	12-2
3	Collingwood Blues	3-1	3-4		2-1	4-1
4	Steinbach Pistons	1-3	2-4	1-2		5-2
5	Kam River Fighting Walleye	1-4	2-12	1-4	2-5	

== Playoffs ==
Quarterfinals
Ottawa Jr. Senators	4
Collingwood Blues	2
Portage Terriers	2
Yarmouth Mariners	1

Semifinals
Ottawa Jr. Senators	0
Brooks Bandits	3
Battlefords North Stars	7
Portage Terriers	1

Finals
Brooks Bandits	4
Battlefords North Stars	0

== Individual awards ==
Most Valuable Player
Aiden Fink (Brooks Bandits)
Top Forward
Aiden Fink (Brooks Bandits)
Top Defenceman
Ethan Beyer (Brooks Bandits)
Top Goaltender
Josh Kotai (Battlefords North Stars)
Most Sportsmanlike Player
Austin Peters (Portage Terriers)
