= 2022 Centennial Cup =

Ice hockey national championship

2022 National championship
Centennial Cup

Tournament details
- City: Estevan, Saskatchewan
- Venue: Affinity Place
- Dates: 18–20 May 2022
- Teams: 10
- Host team: Estevan Bruins
- Defending champions: Brooks Bandits

Final positions
- Champions: Brooks Bandits
- Runners-up: Pickering Panthers

Awards
- MVP: Carson Cherepak

Official website
- Hockey Canada

The 2022 Centennial Cup was the 50th annual Canadian Junior Hockey League (CJHL) national championship tournament for the 2021–22 season. The tournament took place at Affinity Place in Estevan, Saskatchewan from May 18 to 29, 2022. It was the first year the event had been played since 2019, as the COVID-19 pandemic had forced the cancellation of the 2020 and 2021 tournaments. The Brooks Bandits defeated the Pickering Panthers in the championship game to win the national title.

== Format ==
In 2022, the Centennial Cup moved to a 10-team format, including the champions from each of the 9 leagues that make up the CJHL, and the host team, thus eliminating the intervening regional contests for the ANAVET Cup, the Fred Page Cup and the Doyle Cup. Since the Estevan Bruins had a guaranteed berth as the host team, the qualifying berth for the SJHL champions was awarded to the second place Flin Flon Bombers.

The format consisted of a 4-game round-robin with two groups of five teams, followed by a six-team single-elimination play-off.

== Qualifying teams ==
As a result of scheduling conflicts arising from the COVID-19 pandemic, all regional championships were cancelled by Hockey Canada and all nine CJHL league champions and the host team, Estevan Bruins, participated in the tournament, the first time this format had ever been used.

=== Alberta Junior Hockey League ===
The Brooks Bandits finished the regular season in 1st place overall of the AJHL and then went on to win the league championship Inter Pipeline Cup.

Regular Season: 52-6-2 (1st AJHL)
Playoffs: Defeated Canmore Eagles 4-0, Defeated Okotoks Oilers 4-0, Defeated Spruce Grove Saints 4-1;

=== Saskatchewan Junior Hockey League ===
The Estevan Bruins, despite having a bye to the national championship tournament, finished the regular season in 1st place overall in the SJHL regular season, and went on to win the league championship Canalta Cup.

Regular Season: 43-10-2-3 (1st SJHL)
Playoffs: Defeated Notre Dame Hounds 4-1, Defeated Yorkton Terriers 4-0, Defeated Flin Flon Bombers 4–3

The Flin Flon Bombers, after finishing the regular season in 5th place overall, reached the final round of the playoffs and lost game 7 to the Estevan Bruins.

Regular Season: 34-21-2-1 (5th SJHL)
Playoffs: Defeated Battlefords North Stars 4-2, Defeated Humboldt Broncos 4-1, Defeated by Estevan Bruins 4–3

=== Manitoba Junior Hockey League ===
The Dauphin Kings won the MJHL league championship Turnbull Cup after finishing the regular season in 2nd place overall.

Regular Season: 41-12-1-0 (2nd MJHL)
Playoffs: Defeated Swan Valley Stampeders 4-2, Defeated Winkler Flyers 4-1, Defeated Steinbach Pistons 4-3;

=== Superior International Junior Hockey League ===
The Red Lake Miners won the SIJHL league championship Bill Salonen Cup after finishing the regular season in 2nd place overall.

Regular Season: 28-6-2-1 (2nd SIJHL)
Playoffs: Defeated Dryden Ice Dogs 4-2, Defeated Kam River Fighting Walleye 4–2

=== Northern Ontario Junior Hockey League ===
The Soo Thunderbirds won the NOJHL league championship after finishing the regular season in 1st place overall.

Regular Season: 38-5-2-3 (1st NOJHL)
Playoffs: Defeated Blind River Beavers 4-0, Defeated Soo Eagles 4-0, Defeated Hearst Lumberjacks 4–3

=== Ontario Junior Hockey League ===
The Pickering Panthers won the OJHL championship Frank L. Buckland Trophy after finishing the regular season in 2nd place overall.

Regular Season: 39-11-0-4 (2nd OJHL)
Playoffs: Defeated Stouffville Spirit 2-0, Defeated Collingwood Blues 2-0, Defeated Milton Menace 3-0, Defeated Toronto Jr. Canadiens 4-3.

=== Central Canada Hockey League ===
The Ottawa Jr. Senators won the CCHL league championship Bogart Cup after finishing the regular season in 1st place overall.

Regular Season: 43-8-2-2 (1st CCHL)
Playoffs: Defeated Smiths Falls Bears 4-0, Defeated Renfrew Wolves 4-1, Hawkesbury Hawks 4–0

=== Quebec Junior Hockey League ===
The Longueuil Collège Français won the QJHL championship NAPA Cup after finishing the regular season in 1st place overall.

Regular Season: 34-4-3-0 (1st LJAAAQ)
Playoffs: Defeated Granby Inouk 4-2, Defeated Terrebonne Cobras 4-1, Defeated Cégep Beauce-Appalaches Condors 4-1;

=== Maritime Junior A Hockey League ===
The Summerside Western Capitals won the MHL championship Canadian Tire Cup after finishing the regular season in 1st place overall.

Regular Season: 31-4-1-2 (1st MHL)
Playoffs: Defeated Edmundston Blizzard 4-1, Defeated Fredericton Red Wings 4-0, Defeated Truro Bearcats 4–1

=== Map of competing teams ===
Canadian Junior Hockey League

== Round Robin ==
The top 3 teams from each group advanced to the playoffs, and the 1st place teams in each group had a bye to the semifinals.

	Group A	BB	PP	CFL	EB	RLM
1	Brooks Bandits		9-1	5-2	4-0	11-4
2	Pickering Panthers	1-9		3-2	10-5	9-2
3	Collège Français de Longueuil	2-5	2-3		5-3	6-1
4	Estevan Bruins	0-4	5-10	3-5		6-2
5	Red Lake Miners	4-11	2-9	1-6	2-6	

	Group B	DK	SWC	FFB	OJS	ST
1	Dauphin Kings		7-1	1-2	2-1	6-1
2	Summerside Western Capitals	1-7		4-1	4-3	4-1
3	Flin Flon Bombers	2-1	1-4		3-2	6-1
4	Ottawa Jr. Senators	1-2	3-4	2-3		4-0
5	Soo Thunderbirds	1-6	1-4	1-6	0-4	

== Playoffs ==
Quarterfinals
Pickering Panthers	3
Flin Flon Bombers	2
Summerside Western Capitals	3
Collège Français de Longueuil	4

Semifinals
Pickering Panthers	2
Dauphin Kings	0
Brooks Bandits	11
Collège Français de Longueuil	2

Finals
Pickering Panthers	1
Brooks Bandits	4

== Individual awards ==
Most Valuable Player
Carson Cherepak (Dauphin Kings)

Top Scorer
Ryan McAllister (Brooks Bandits)

Top Forward
Ryan McAllister (Brooks Bandits)

Top Defenceman
Xavier Lapointe (Flin Flon Bombers)

Top Goaltender
Carson Cherepak (Dauphin Kings)

Most Sportsmanlike Player
Colby MacArthur (Summerside Western Capitals)
