= 2012–13 SIJHL season =

- League: Superior International Junior Hockey League
- Sport: Hockey
- Duration: Regular season 2012-09-21 – 2013-03-13; Playoffs; 2013-03-16 – 2013-04-22
- Teams: 7
- Finals champions: Minnesota Wilderness

SIJHL seasons
- 2011–12 2013–14

The 2012–13 SIJHL season was the 12th season of the Superior International Junior Hockey League (SIJHL). The seven teams of the SIJHL were to play 56-game schedules.

Come February, the top teams of the league will play down for the Bill Salonen Cup, the SIJHL championship. The winner of the Bill Salonen Cup will compete in the Central Canadian Junior "A" championship, the Dudley Hewitt Cup. If successful against the winners of the Ontario Junior Hockey League and Northern Ontario Junior Hockey League, the champion would then move on to play in the Canadian Junior Hockey League championship, the 2013 Royal Bank Cup.

== Changes ==
- Iron Range Ironheads become Minnesota Iron Rangers and relocate to Hoyt Lakes, Minnesota.
- Wisconsin Wilderness become Minnesota Wilderness and relocate to Cloquet, Minnesota.
- Sioux Lookout Flyers announce withdrawal from 2012-13 season on October 3, 2012.
- Duluth Clydesdales removed from league on January 20, 2012 due to player loss.

== Final standings ==
Note: GP = Games played; W = Wins; L = Losses; OTL = Overtime losses; SL = Shootout losses; GF = Goals for; GA = Goals against; PTS = Points; x = clinched playoff berth; y = clinched division title; z = clinched conference title

Standings
Team	Centre	W–L–OTL	GF–GA	Points
Minnesota Wilderness	Cloquet, Minnesota	51-3-2	282-85	104
Fort Frances Lakers	Fort Frances, Ontario	35-18-3	208-165	73
Dryden Ice Dogs	Dryden, Ontario	28-25-3	189-197	59
Thunder Bay North Stars	Thunder Bay, Ontario	28-27-1	165-206	57
Minnesota Iron Rangers	Hoyt Lakes, Minnesota	26-28-2	161-194	54
Duluth Clydesdales	Duluth, Minnesota	2-32-2	94-212	6
Sioux Lookout Flyers	Sioux Lookout, Ontario	0-3-0	4-23	0

Sioux Lookout left the league after only 3 games, schedule was reorganized without them. Duluth's franchise was revoked by the league after 36 games, leaving 20 games unplayed, these are listed as 1-0 forfeit losses by the league.

Teams listed on the official league website.

Standings listed on official league website.

== 2012-13 Bill Salonen Cup Playoffs ==
Quarter-finals
4	Thunder Bay	1
5	MN Iron Rangers	2

Semi-finals
1	MN Wilderness	4
5	MN Iron Rangers	0
2	Fort Frances	4
3	Dryden	3

Bill Salonen Cup Finals
1	MN Wilderness	4
2	Fort Frances	2

Playoff results are listed on the official league website.

== Dudley Hewitt Cup Championship ==
Hosted by the North Bay Trappers in North Bay, Ontario. Minnesota Wilderness win the event.

Round Robin

North Bay Trappers (NOJHL) 4 - Minnesota Wilderness 1
Minnesota Wilderness 7 - Soo Thunderbirds (NOJHL) 0
Minnesota Wilderness 3 - St. Michael's Buzzers (OJHL) 0

Final

Minnesota Wilderness 4 - St. Michael's Buzzers (OJHL) 3 OT

== 2013 Royal Bank Cup Championship ==
Hosted by the Summerside Western Capitals in Summerside, Prince Edward Island. Minnesota Wilderness lost semi-final.

Round Robin

Summerside Western Capitals (MHL) 5 - Minnesota Wilderness 1
Brooks Bandits (AJHL) 6 - Minnesota Wilderness 3
Minnesota Wilderness 5 - Truro Bearcats (MHL) 3
Surrey Eagles (BCHL) 5 - Minnesota Wilderness 2

Semi-final

Brooks Bandits (AJHL) 5 - Minnesota Wilderness 4 OT

== Scoring leaders ==
Note: GP = Games played; G = Goals; A = Assists; Pts = Points; PIM = Penalty minutes

Player	Team	GP	G	A	Pts	PIM
Mike Dietrich	Minnesota Wilderness	46	28	49	77	68
Jake Larson	Minnesota Wilderness	49	44	28	72	101
Jordan Christianson	Fort Frances Lakers	52	22	49	71	33
Chris Belhumeur	Dryden Ice Dogs	51	33	33	66	52
Jordan Shockley	Minnesota Wilderness	52	20	39	59	58
Jeremy Johnson	Minnesota Wilderness	52	28	30	58	82
Matt Kaarela	Thunder Bay North Stars	38	35	21	56	62
Colton Spicer	Fort Frances Lakers	45	34	22	56	51
Tyson Holder	Dryden Ice Dogs	53	25	29	54	45
Michael MacKinnon	Minnesota Wilderness	44	18	34	52	51

== Leading goaltenders ==
Note: Minimum 1000 minutes; GP = Games played; Mins = Minutes played; W = Wins; L = Losses: OTL = Overtime losses; SL = Shootout losses; GA = Goals Allowed; SO = Shutouts; GAA = Goals against average

Player	Team	GP	Mins	W	L	SOL	Svs	GA	GAA	Sv%	SO
Gordy Defiel	Minnesota Wilderness	31	1732:36	25	1	2	688	40	1.39	0.945	8
JoJo Jeanetta	Minnesota Wilderness	26	1404:06	22	2	0	620	42	1.79	0.937	5
Eric Szymczyk	Dryden Ice Dogs	44	2488:34	19	20	1	1296	139	3.35	0.903	1
Tanner Hamilton	Fort Frances Lakers	27	1267:26	12	7	2	566	66	3.12	0.896	1
Chase Hollander	Minnesota Iron Rangers	38	1981:38	12	20	0	1004	122	3.69	0.892	0

== Awards ==
- SIJHL Most Valuable Player - Mike Dietrich (Minnesota Wilderness)
- Top Goaltender - Gordy Defiel (Minnesota Wilderness)
- Best Defensive Forward - Jeremy Johnson (Minnesota Wilderness)
- Rookie of the Year - Jake Larson (Minnesota Wilderness)
- Top Defenceman - Len Pelletier (Dryden Ice Dogs)
- Most Improved Player - Colton Spicer (Fort Frances Lakers)
- Most Sportsmanlike Player - Jacob Nolan (Fort Frances Lakers)
- Top Scorer - Mike Dietrich (Minnesota Wilderness)
- Co-Coach of the Year - Rod Aldoff (Minnesota Wilderness)/Chris Walby (Minnesota Iron Rangers)
- Scholastic Award - Joel Bogacki (Fort Frances Lakers)
- Gary Cook Memorial Executive of the Year - Trevor Hosanna (Hockey Northwestern Ontario)
- Playoff Most Valuable Player - Mike Dietrich (Minnesota Wilderness)

== See also ==
- 2013 Royal Bank Cup
- Dudley Hewitt Cup
- Ontario Junior Hockey League
- Northern Ontario Junior Hockey League
- Greater Ontario Junior Hockey League
- 2012 in ice hockey
- 2013 in ice hockey

Preceded by 2011–12 SIJHL season	SIJHL seasons	Succeeded by 2013–14 SIJHL season
