= 2001–02 SIJHL season =

Inaugural season of the SIJHL

- League: SIJHL
- Sport: Ice hockey
- Games: 48
- Teams: 7
- League champions: Dryden Ice Dogs
- Runners-up: Fort Frances Borderland Thunder

Seasons
- 2002–03 →

The 2001–02 SIJHL season was the inaugural season of the Superior International Junior Hockey League (SIJHL). During the first regular season, the five franchise teams each played 48 games, while two associate teams each played 24 games. In the post-season, the third-place Dryden Ice Dogs swept the first-place Fort Frances Borderland Thunder in four games to win the league championship Bill Salonen Cup.

== Regular season ==
The five franchise teams each played 48 regular season games, while the two associate teams each played 24 games.

Standings
Team	GP	W	L	T	Pts	GF	GA
Fort Frances Borderland Thunder	48	28	11	9	65	215	142
Feathermen Hawks	48	29	15	4	62	219	157
Dryden Ice Dogs	48	25	15	8	58	221	169
Thunder Bay Bulldogs	48	24	21	3	51	216	198
Iron Range Yellow Jackets (Note: The Iron Range Yellow Jackets & Northwest Wisconsin Knights had an interleague relationship with the SIJHL and the Minnesota Junior Hockey League.)	24	12	10	2	26	102	88
Northwest Wisconsin Knights	24	6	14	4	16	77	118
Thunder Bay Wolves	48	4	42	2	10	111	289

== Post-season ==
2002 SIJHL playoffs
Bill Salonen Cup

Tournament details
- Teams: 4

Final positions
- Champions: Dryden Ice Dogs
- Runners-up: Fort Frances Borderland Thunder
- Semifinalists: Thunder Bay Bulldogs; Feathermen Hawks

Tournament statistics
- Games played: 15
- Goals scored: 61 (4.07 per game)

The third-place Dryden Ice Dogs swept the first-place Fort Frances Borderland Thunder in four games to win the inaugural league championship Bill Salonen Cup.

Semifinals
Borderland Thunder	4
Bulldogs	3
Ice Dogs	4
Hawks	0

Finals
Borderland Thunder	0
Ice Dogs	4

The championship Dryden Ice Dogs went on to compete for the Dudley Hewitt Cup and lost to the Rayside-Balfour Sabrecats of the Northern Ontario Junior Hockey League (NOJHL).
