= Bill Salonen =

Canadian ice hockey administrator (1935–2025)

- Born: William Salonen; 4 August 1935; Port Arthur, Ontario
- Died: 18 October 2025 (aged 90)
- Occupations: Teacher; Administrator; Politician
- Spouses: Donna McIver (m. 1958); Linda Boyd (m. 1984)
- Children: 4
- Awards: Golden Jubilee Medal (2002)

President of Hockey Northwestern Ontario
- In office 1979–1983

Mayor of Dryden, Ontario
- In office 1992–1997

Bill Salonen (4 August 1935 – 18 October 2025) was a Canadian junior ice hockey administrator and namesake of the Superior International Junior Hockey League (SIJHL) championship cup. Salonen was also the general manager of the 2001–02 Dryden Ice Dogs, which was the first team to win a SIJHL championship. Salonen also served as president of Hockey Northwestern Ontario (HNO) and as mayor of the City of Dryden, Ontario.

== Early life and political career ==
Salonen was born on 4 August 1935 in Port Arthur, Ontario. He moved to Dryden, Ontario in 1956 where he worked as a school teacher and principal. He served on the Dryden City Council for 14 years, including as mayor from 1992 to 1997.

== Hockey administration and service ==
Salonen served as the president of Hockey Northwestern Ontario (HNO) from 1979–1983.

Salonen was the general manager of the 2001–2002 Dryden Ice Dogs. He led the team to the SIJHL championship that bears his name in the inaugural 2001–02 SIJHL season.

== Awards and honours ==
Salonen was awarded the Hockey Northwestern Ontario Order of Merit in 1987 and the Hockey Canada Order of Merit in 1993. In 2002, he was awarded the Queen Elizabeth II Golden Jubilee Medal by the Government of Canada. He was inducted into the Northwestern Ontario Sports Hall of Fame in the Builder category in 2014. He is the namesake of the Superior International Junior Hockey League championship Bill Salonen Cup.

== Legacy ==
The Bill Salonen Cup is awarded annually to the champions of the Superior International Junior Hockey League. It was first awarded to the 2001–02 Dryden Ice Dogs with Salonen as general manager.
