= 2024–25 SIJHL season =

24th season of the SIJHL

- League: SIJHL
- Sport: Ice hockey
- Duration: Regular season September–March; Playoffs; March–April
- Games: 204
- Teams: 8
- Total attendance: 63,269
- Streaming partner: sijhl.tv

League championship
- Champions: Kam River Fighting Walleye
- Runners-up: Dryden Ice Dogs

Seasons
- ← 2023–24 2025–26 →

The 2024–25 SIJHL season is the 24th season of the Superior International Junior Hockey League (SIJHL). The Kam River Fighting Walleye won the league championship Bill Salonen Cup and advanced to the national championship tournament in Calgary.

The Wisconsin Lumberjacks relocated from Spooner, Wisconsin, to Ironwood, Michigan, and were renamed the Ironwood Lumberjacks. Dean Thibodeau was appointed as the new league commissioner following the departure of Darrin Nicholas, who held the role since 2020.

In January 2025, it was reported that the Kenora Islanders was suspending operations midseason and seeking a new owner to take over the franchise, citing a conflict with the SIJHL board of governors.

== Regular season ==
Teams were scheduled to play 50 regular season games, including 7 games against each other team. As the Kenora Islanders suspended operations midseason, each of their remaining matches was recorded as 1-0 loss for Kenora.

Standings
Team	GP	W	L	OTL	SOL	GF	GA	Pts
Dryden Ice Dogs	50	36	9	3	2	224	136	77
Kam River Fighting Walleye	50	36	13	1	0	236	118	73
Thunder Bay North Stars	50	32	12	2	4	235	140	70
Sioux Lookout Bombers	50	31	14	2	3	200	133	67
Red Lake Miners	50	22	21	2	5	159	171	51
Fort Frances Lakers	50	20	21	7	2	146	175	49
Ironwood Lumberjacks	50	11	35	1	3	131	238	26
Kenora Islanders	50	2	46	2	0	59	279	6

Source: "2024–25 Superior International Junior Hockey League standings". hockeydb.com.

== Post-season ==
2025 SIJHL playoffs
Bill Salonen Cup

Tournament details
- Dates: 21 March–29 April
- Teams: 7
- Defending champions: Sioux Lookout Bombers

Final positions
- Champions: Kam River Fighting Walleye
- Runners-up: Dryden Ice Dogs
- Semifinalists: Red Lake Miners; Thunder Bay North Stars

Tournament statistics
- Games played: 32
- Goals scored: 200 (6.25 per game)
- Attendance: 19,099 (597 per game)

Official website
- 2025 SIJHL playoffs

Each round of the playoffs was a single-elimination best-of-seven series. The first-place Dryden Ice Dogs had a bye in the first round. The Kam River Fighting Walleye swept the first and second rounds, and went on to defeat the Ice Dogs in the final round, 4-2, to win the league championship Bill Salonen Cup.

Quarterfinals
Red Lake	4
Sioux Lookout	3
Kam River	4
Ironwood	0
Thunder Bay	4
Fort Frances	3

Semifinals
Red Lake	0
Dryden	4
Kam River	4
Thunder Bay	0

Finals
Dryden	2
Kam River	4

Source: "2025 SIJHL playoff results". sijhlhockey.com. Superior International Junior Hockey League.

== National championship ==
2025 National championship
Centennial Cup
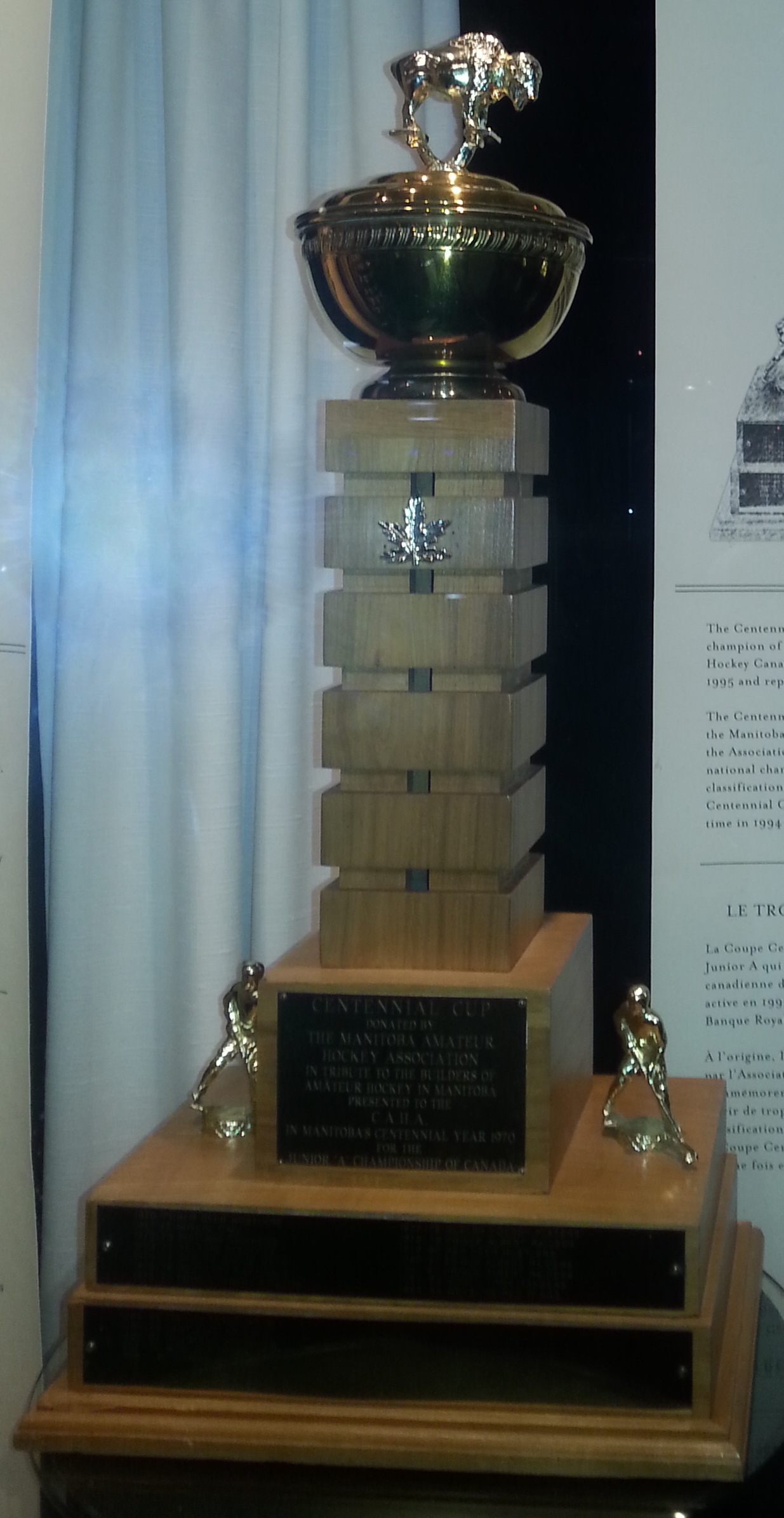

Tournament details
- City: Calgary, AB
- Venue: Max Bell Centre
- Dates: 8–18 May 2025
- Teams: 10
- Host team: Calgary Canucks

Official website
- Hockey Canada

The 54th annual Junior A national championship tournament was hosted by the Calgary Canucks of the Alberta Junior Hockey League (AJHL) at the Max Bell Centre in Calgary, and included the championship teams from the 9 leagues that collectively make up the Canadian Junior Hockey League (CJHL). The SIJHL was represented by the championship Kam River Fighting Walleye, who were eliminated from competition at the preliminary stage.

== See also ==
- 2025 Centennial Cup
- Canadian Junior Hockey League
- Hockey Canada
- Hockey Northwestern Ontario
- Superior International Junior Hockey League
