= Iron Range Yellow Jackets =

- City: Coleraine, Minnesota
- League: Minnesota Junior Hockey League
- Operated: 1999-2002
- Home arena: Hodgins-Berardo Arena
- Colors: Yellow, Black, and White
- General manager: Eric Ballard
- Head coach: Eric Ballard

The Iron Range Yellow Jackets were a Junior "B" ice hockey team from Coleraine, Minnesota, United States. This defunct hockey team was a part of the Minnesota Junior Hockey League and an interleague member of the Junior "A" Superior International Junior Hockey League.

== History ==
The Yellow Jackets played in the MNJHL from 1999 until 2002. Iron Range won the regular season title and playoff championship all three seasons. During their first two seasons the Yellow Jackets played home games at Hodgins-Berardo Arena in Coleraine.

Iron Range played in two USA Hockey Junior B National Tournament championship games, coming up just short both times. The Jackets attempted to win the title in their first season, but lost in overtime to the Ventura Mariners 5–4. In 2000-01 the Yellow Jackets traveled to the east coast and again were a goal short, losing to 5–4 to the Connecticut Clippers.

During that final 2001–02 season they called the IRA Civic Center in Grand Rapids home and doubled their schedule by competing in the SIJHL in the Thunder Bay, region of Ontario, Canada.

In July 2002 the Yellow Jackets suspended operations in hopes of returning in 2003–04. Head Coach Eric Ballard was named coach of the Northwest Wisconsin Knights for the 2002–03 season.

== Iron Range junior hockey ==
Junior A hockey returned to the Iron Range, in Chisholm with the Iron Range Ironheads during the 2011-12 SIJHL season. In 2012, the team moved to Hoyt Lakes and was renamed the Minnesota Iron Rangers.

== Season-by-season results ==
Season	GP	W	L	T	OTL	GF	GA	Pts	Regular season Results	Playoff Results
1999-00	36	33	3	0	0	287	93	66	1st, MNJHL	Bush Cup champion. Nationals runner-up.
2000-01	35	32	2	-	1	270	86	65	1st, MNJHL	Bush Cup champion. Nationals runner-up.
2001-02	42	37	3	-	2	275	126	74	1st, MNJHL	Bush Cup champion. Nationals appearance.
2001-02	24	12	10	2	0	102	88	26	Partial SIJHL member	DNP
