= Fort Frances Lakers =

Junior ice hockey club

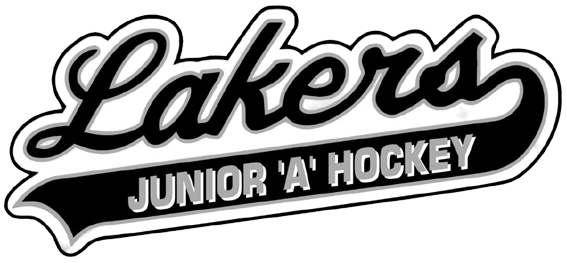
- City: Fort Frances
- League: SIJHL
- Founded: 2007
- Home arena: Memorial Sports Centre
- Colours: Black; Purple; Silver
- Owner: Fort Frances Lakers Hockey Association
- General manager: Luke Judson
- Head coach: Luke Judson
- Website: fortfranceslakers.com

Franchise history
- 2007–2009: Fort Frances Jr. Sabres
- Since 2009: Fort Frances Lakers

Championships
- League: 2014; 2015; 2016

The Fort Frances Lakers are a junior ice hockey club and franchise of the Superior International Junior Hockey League (SIJHL) based in Fort Frances, Ontario, Canada. The club is owned by the non-profit Fort Frances Lakers Hockey Association.

== History ==
=== Jr. Sabres ===
Founded in 2007, the Fort Frances Jr. Sabres were the first junior A team to play in Fort Frances since the Fort Frances Borderland Thunder left the Superior International Junior Hockey League (SIJHL) after four seasons in 2005. The Borderland Thunder wanted to play in the Manitoba Junior Hockey League, but chose to go on hiatus when they did not receive clearance for the transfer. The Sabres new ownership group, led by Carolyn Kellaway, were approved as the seventh member of the SIJHL in 2007.

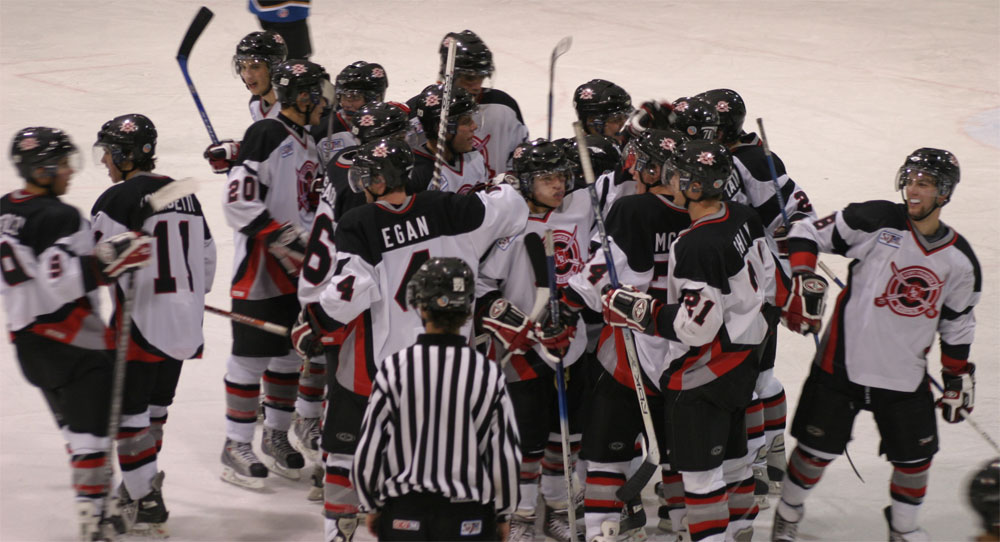
Sabres celebrate an overtime victory (2007)

On September 14, 2007, the Fort Frances Jr. Sabres played their first game at home against the Thunder Bay Bulldogs, defeating the Bulldog 5–1 and also claiming their first team victory. Alessio Tomassetti scored the team's first goal 3:14 into the first period. Goaltender Ryan Faragher, a Fort Frances native, earned the win while making 29 saves.

=== Lakers ===
In the summer of 2009, the Fort Frances team nearly folded. With the Thunder Bay Bearcats and Schreiber Diesels leaving the SIJHL, the ownership of the Sabres decided to pull their team out of the 2009–10 season despite initially telling the press and the league that the team was operating and would not be sitting out during the coming season. It was later revealed the franchise would be sold to new ownership, but as the season drew nearer, the team had not found a buyer. In an effort to keep the team alive, the community took over the franchise and turned it into a non-profit organization. On September 10, 2009, the team rebranded by changing their name to the Lakers.

Lakers action in 2011

The reborn community-owned Lakers played their first game as a non-profit organization on September 17, 2009, in Fort Frances against the defending league champion Fort William North Stars in their home opener. The Lakers lost 5–2 with an empty net goal. A night later, the Lakers won the first game of their new era by defeating the expansion Thunder Bay Wolverines in Thunder Bay 3–2.

Statistics
Season	GP	W	L	T	OTL	Pts	GF	GA	Regular season	Post-season
2007–08	50	22	21	4	3	51	173	183	5th place	Lost quarterfinal against Schreibner (3:0)
2008–09	50	30	17	0	3	63	199	139	3rd place	Won quarterfinal against Sioux Lookout (3:0); Lost semifinal against Thunder Bay (4:1)
2009–10	52	14	33	0	5	33	153	251	5th place	Won quarterfinal against Thunder Bay (4:3); Lost semifinal against Dryden (4:2)
2010–11	56	34	19	0	3	71	208	174	2nd place	Lost seeding game against Wisconsin (2:1); Lost semifinal against Dryden (4:2)
2011–12	56	37	12	0	7	81	255	166	2nd place	Won seeding game against Wisconsin (2:1); Won semifinal against Dryden (4:2); Lost final against Wisconsin (4:3)
2012–13	56	35	18	0	3	73	208	165	2nd place	Won semifinal against Dryden (4:2); Lost final against Minnesota (4:3)
2013–14	56	46	6	0	4	96	295	150	1st place	Won seeding game against Thunder Bay (6:4); Won semifinal against English River (4:0); Won final against Minnesota (4:3)
2014–15	56	43	11	0	2	88	254	197	1st place	Won semifinal against Thunder Bay (4:1); Won final against Dryden (4:2)
2015–16	56	46	8	0	4	96	249	140	1st place	Won semifinal against English River (4:0); Won final against Dryden (4:2)
2016–17	56	24	25	0	7	55	188	201	5th place	Won quarterfinal against Thief River Falls (3:1); Lost semifinal against Dryden (4:0)
2017–18	56	15	32	0	9	39	172	241	5th place	Won quarterfinal against English River (3:1); Lost semifinal against Dryden (4:1)
2018–19	56	18	35	0	3	39	177	237	5th place	Lost quarterfinal against Dryden (3:0)
2019–20	54	21	27	0	6	48	174	214	Cancelled	
2020–21	5	5	0	0	0	28	4	10	Cancelled	
2021–22	41	5	35	1	0	11	83	195	7th place	Lost quarterfinal against Dryden (3:0)
2022–23	54	9	41	0	1	22	134	301	7th place	Lost quarterfinal against Dryden (4:1)
2023–24	49	12	31	3	3	30	144	227	7th place	Lost quarterfinal against Sioux Lookout (4:0)
2024–25	50	20	21	7	2	49	146	175	6th place	Lost quarterfinal against Thunder Bay (4:3)
2025–26	48	37	7	0	2	78	181	98	1st place	Won semifinal against Kam River (4:2); Lost final against Thunder Bay (4:3)

Source: "Fort Frances Lakers statistics and history". hockeydb.com.

== Dudley Hewitt Cup ==
Central Canada Jr. A Championships'
NOJHL – OJHL – SIJHL – Host
Round-robin play with 2nd vs. 3rd in semifinal to advance against 1st in the championship game.

Year	Round-obin	Record	Standing	Semifinal	Championship
2014	L, Toronto Lakeshore Patriots 1–4; L, Wellington Dukes 0–3; W, Kirkland Lake Gold Miners 6–3	1–2–0	3rd of 4	L, Toronto Lakeshore Patriots 0–6	—
2015; Host	OTW, Toronto Lakeshore Patriots 2–1; L, Soo Thunderbirds 3–6; W, Dryden Ice Dogs 5–3	2–1–0	3rd of 4	W, Toronto Lakeshore Patriots 6–4	L, Soo Thunderbirds 2–3
2016	L, Kirkland Lake Gold Miners 5–8; L, Soo Thunderbirds 5–6; L, Trenton Golden Hawks 0–3	0–3–0	4th of 4	Did not advance	
