= Affinity Place =

Indoor arena in Saskatchewan, Canada

Coordinates: 49°8′33.58″N 102°59′19.95″W

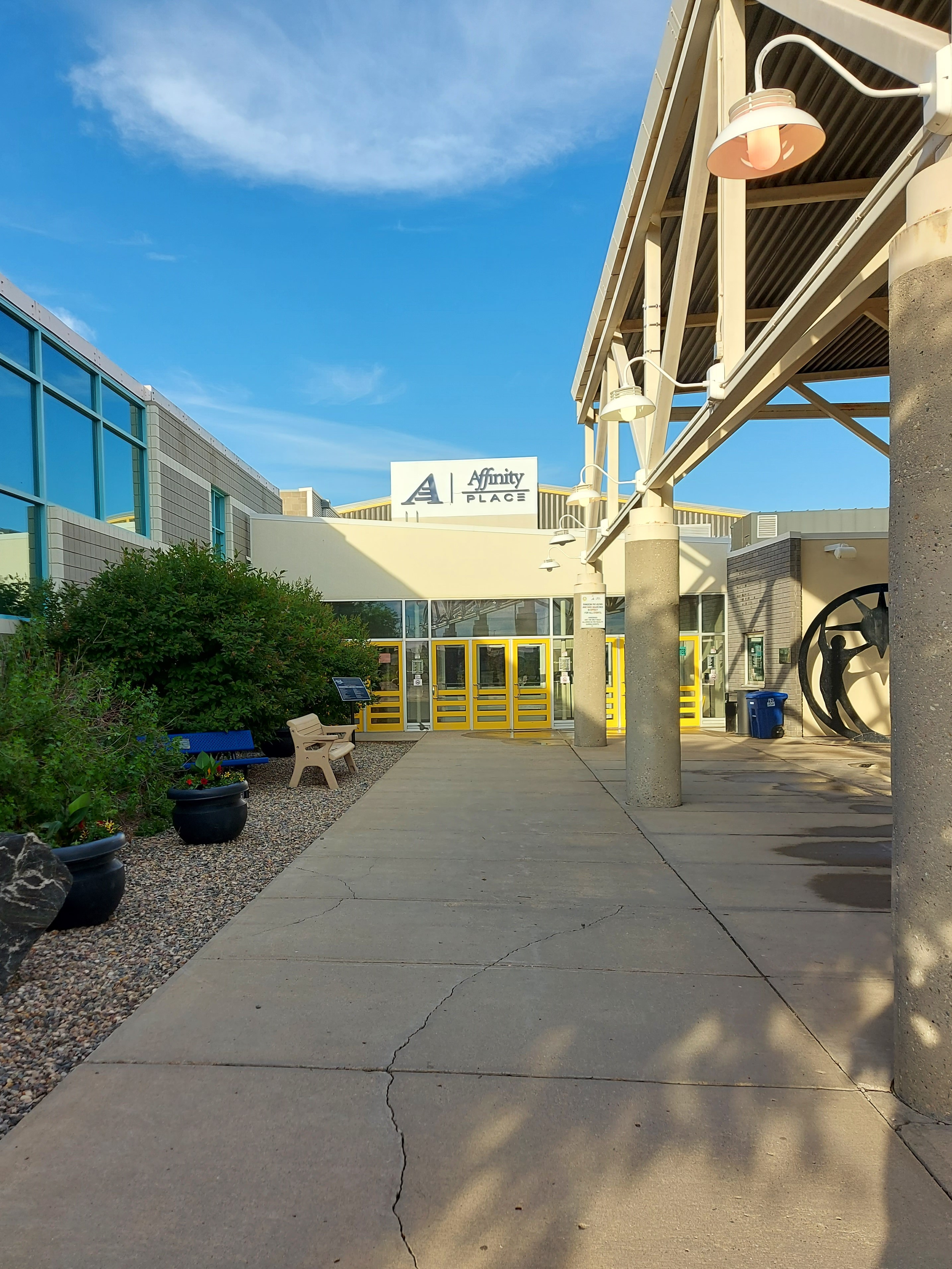
- Affinity Place entrance
- Interactive map of Affinity Place
- Former names: Spectra Place (2011-2013)
- Location: 701 Souris Avenue; Estevan, SK
- Owner: City of Estevan
- Operator: City of Estevan
- Capacity: 3,664

Construction
- Groundbreaking: 2009
- Built: 2009-2011
- Opened: September 16, 2011
- Cost: C$23.5 million

Tenant
- Estevan Bruins (SJHL) (2011–present)

Website
- http://estevan.ca/affinity-place/

Affinity Place is an indoor multi-use event centre in Estevan, Saskatchewan, home to the Estevan Bruins of the Saskatchewan Junior Hockey League.

== History ==
Construction on Affinity Place began in May 2009 to replace Estevan’s aging Civic Auditorium. The project was finished in 2011. The first event for the $23.5 million facility, initially named Spectra Place, was held on April 15, 2011 with a concert featuring Tom Cochrane and Kim Mitchell.

The arena was renamed to Affinity Place in 2013.

The venue has hosted various sporting events, like curling, hockey and mixed martial arts, along with a series of concerts.

Notable hockey events hosted at Affinity Place include the 2016 Western Canada Cup and the 2022 Centennial Cup.

The venue became the first to host both the SaskTel Tankard and the Saskatchewan Scotties Tournament of Hearts in the same year in 2023.

Past concerts have included performances by The Tragically Hip, Mötley Crüe, Sum 41 and The Offspring.

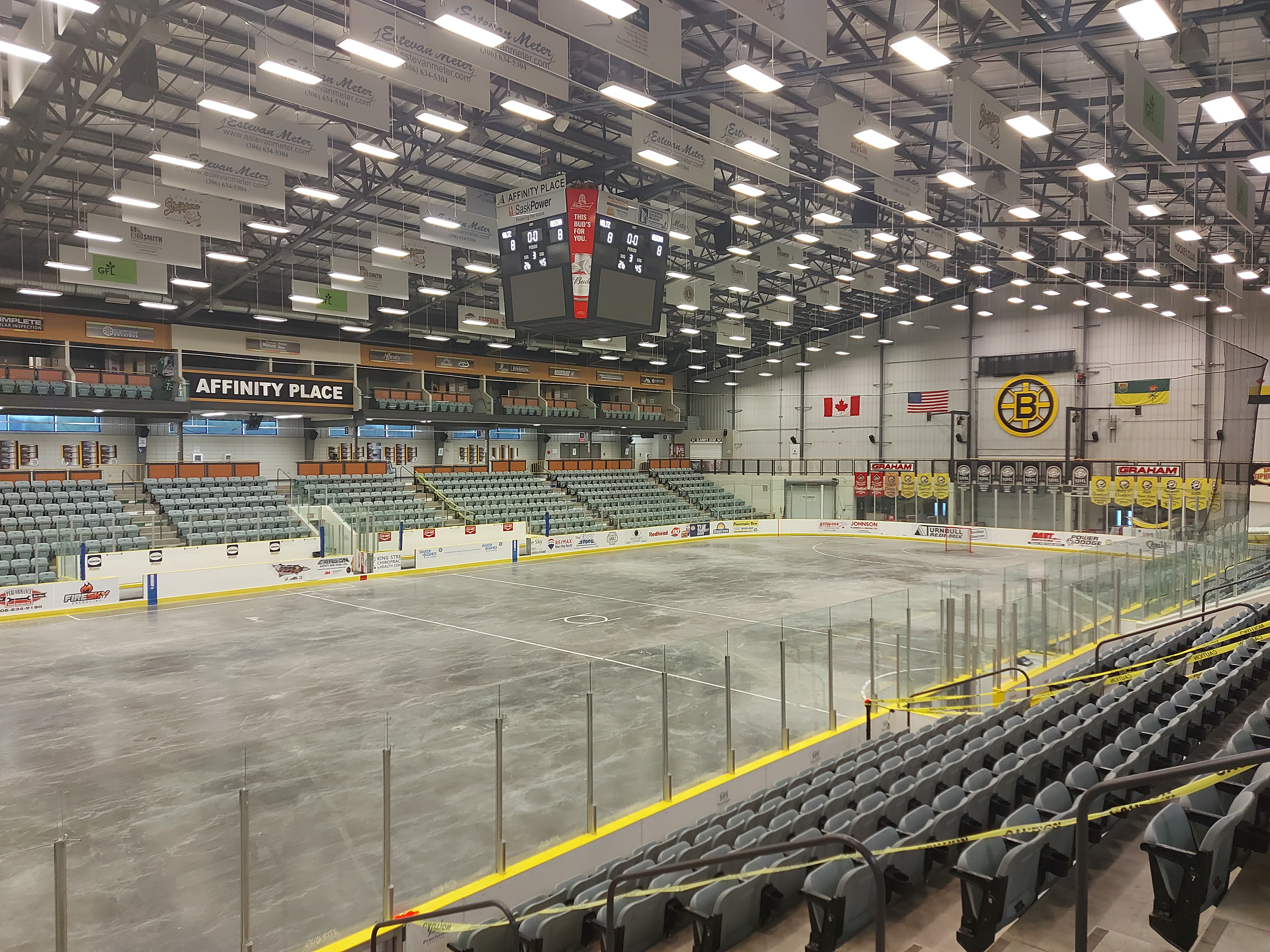
Inside Affinity Place
