= 2023–24 SIJHL season =

22nd season of the SIJHL

- League: SIJHL
- Sport: Ice hockey
- Duration: September–April
- Games: 49
- Teams: 8
- Streaming partner: sijhl.tv
- League champions: Sioux Lookout Bombers
- Runners-up: Kam River Fighting Walleye

Seasons
- ← 2022–23 2024–25 →

The 2023–24 SIJHL season was the 22nd season of the Superior International Junior Hockey League. The league's 7 teams each played a 49-game regular season schedule from September 2023 – March 2024. The Sioux Lookout Bombers won the league championship Bill Salonen Cup after defeating the Kam River Fighting Walleye in four games in the final round of the playoffs.

== League changes ==
The Kenora Islanders joined the league as an expansion team. League commissioner Darrin Nicholas stepped down at the end of the season to pursue other opportunities. Dean Thibodeau was appointed as the seventh commissioner in league history on 2 August 2024.

== Regular season ==
Teams played each other team 7 times during the regular season.

Standings
Team	GP	W	L	OTL	SOL	Pts
Kam River Fighting Walleye	49	39	9	1	0	79
Sioux Lookout Bombers	49	35	10	2	2	74
Thunder Bay North Stars	49	32	12	3	2	69
Dryden Ice Dogs	49	31	16	1	1	64
Red Lake Miners	49	29	18	2	0	60
Wisconsin Lumberjacks	49	16	26	6	1	39
Fort Frances Lakers	49	12	31	4	2	30
Kenora Islanders	49	2	46	0	1	5

== Post-season ==
2024 SIJHL playoffs
Bill Salonen Cup

Tournament details
- Dates: 22 March – 21 April
- Teams: 8
- Defending champions: Kam River Fighting Walleye

Final positions
- Champions: Sioux Lookout Bombers
- Runners-up: Kam River Fighting Walleye
- Semifinalists: Red Lake Miners; Thunder Bay North Stars

Tournament statistics
- Games played: 30
- Goals scored: 226 (7.53 per game)
- Attendance: 13,146 (438 per game)

Official website
- 2024 SIJHL playoffs

The playoff format consisted of 3 best-of-7 rounds and all 8 teams. Ultimately the 2nd place Sioux Lookout Bombers swept the 1st place Kam River Fighting Walleye 4-0 in the final round.

Quarterfinals
Kam River	4
Kenora	0
Dryden	1
Red Lake	4
Sioux Lookout	4
Fort Frances	0
Thunder Bay	4
Wisconsin	0

Semifinals
Kam River	4
Red Lake	0
Sioux Lookout	4
Thunder Bay	1

Finals
Kam River	0
Sioux Lookout	4

The Sioux Lookout Bombers advanced to the national championship tournament and were eliminated after the preliminary round.

== See also ==
- 2024 Centennial Cup
- Canadian Junior Hockey League
- Hockey Canada
- Hockey Northwestern Ontario
- Superior International Junior Hockey League
