= Kenora Islanders =

Junior ice hockey team

- City: Kenora, Ontario
- League: SIJHL
- Founded: 2023
- Folded: 2025
- Home arena: Moncrief Construction Sports Centre
- Colours
- Owner(s): Jack Dawson
- Head coach: Nathan Bruyere
- Website: kenoraislanders.com

The Kenora Islanders were a junior ice hockey team in the Superior International Junior Hockey League based in Kenora, Ontario. The team debuted as an expansion franchise in the 2023–24 SIJHL season. The team suspended operations in January 2025 and announced it was seeking a new owner to take over the franchise, citing a conflict with the SIJHL board of governors.

== Team identity ==
The name Kenora Islanders refers to the city's proximity to the Lake of the Woods and its many islands. The club also considered calling itself the Kenora Thistles after the 1907 Stanley Cup championship team that hailed from Kenora, and the present-day minor hockey club of the same name.

== Arena ==
Where the team played its home games was a point of contention in the local community. The two public arenas in Kenora had been in high demand since before the Islanders existed. Prior to the team's inaugural season, the City of Kenora announced that the team could not be accommodated at either of its arenas due to competing demands and concerns raised by community groups and other users of the facilities. Despite this, the Islanders played 15 of their 25 regular season home games at the city-owned Moncrief Construction Sports Centre, 8 games at the Woodland Arena in the community of Vermilion Bay, Ontario — approximately 94 kilometres (58 mi) east of Kenora — one game at the Chi Key Wis Arena in Naotkamegwanning First Nation — approximately 90 kilometres (56 mi) south of Kenora — and one game was forfeit.

The city issued a ice allocation bylaw in December 2023 that prioritised minor hockey, public skating, and special events ahead of the Islanders. In the 2024–25 SIJHL season, the Islanders were scheduled to play 16 regular season games at the Moncrief Construction Sports Centre and 8 games at the Woodland Arena.

== History ==
The team finished the regular 2023–24 SIJHL season in last place with 2 wins and 47 losses. In one of those games, the Kam River Fighting Walleye set an all-time league record with 104 shots on goal during a single match. It may have also been a record for the Kenora Islanders goaltender, Kaden King, who made 93 saves.

In October 2024, the team fired its head coach and general manager, Gatlin Church.

In January 2025, the team suspended operations and announced it was seeking a new owner to take over the franchise, citing a conflict with the SIJHL board of governors.

Season-by-season record
Season	GP	W	L	OTL	SOL	T	Pts	Finish	Playoffs
2023–24	49	2	46	0	1	0	5	8th overall	Lost 1st round against Fighting Walleye (4:0)
2024–25	32	2	28	0	0	2	6	8th overall	Did not qualify

Source: "Kenora Islanders hockey team statistics and history". hockeydb.com.

== See also ==
- City of Kenora
- Superior International Junior Hockey League
