= Ironwood Lumberjacks =

Junior ice hockey team

- City: Ironwood, Michigan
- League: SIJHL
- Founded: 2019
- Home arena: Pat O’Donnell Civic Center
- Colours
- Owner: Northland Family Holdings
- General manager: Douglas E. Lein II
- Head coach: Douglas E. Lein II
- Website: ironwoodlumberjacks.com

Franchise history
- 2019–2024: Wisconsin Lumberjacks
- Since 2024: Ironwood Lumberjacks

The Ironwood Lumberjacks are a junior ice hockey team in the Superior International Junior Hockey League based in Ironwood, Michigan. The team was established as an expansion team based in Spooner, Wisconsin in the 2019–20 SIJHL season. The team relocated to Ironwood ahead of the 2024–25 SIJHL season and plays their home games in the Pat O'Donnell Civic Center, which opened in 2020. The team's inaugural season was shortened due to the COVID-19 pandemic, and the team was forced to sit out the 2020–21 season entirely.

Season-by-season record
Season	GP	W	L	OTL	SOL	Pts	Finish	Playoffs
2019–20	54	21	27	5	1	48	6th overall	Playoffs cancelled
2020–21	Season cancelled							
2021–22	43	16	25	1	1	34	5th overall	Lost qualifying round against Thunder Bay (3:0)
2022–23	52	18	28	3	3	44	6th overall	Won first round against Sioux Lookout (4:3); Lost second round against Kam River (4:1)
2023–24	49	16	26	6	1	39	6th overall	Lost first round against Thunder Bay (4:0)
Ironwood Lumberjacks
2024–25	50	11	35	1	3	26	7th place	Lost quarterfinal against Kam River (4:0)
2025–26	48	9	37	1	1	20	6th place	Lost quarterfinal against Thunder Bay (4:0)

Source: "Ironwood Lumberjacks statistics and history". hockeydb.com.

== Sources ==
- Dunick, Leith (7 August 2024). "SIJHL approves Lumberjacks move to Ironwood, Mich". TBNewsWatch.com. Dougall Media.
- "Wisconsin Lumberjacks hockey team statistics and history at hockeydb.com". www.hockeydb.com.
- Laskaris, Adam (2 September 2022). "Alberta junior hockey team blows out opponent by over 20 goals". dailyhive.com.
- "Wisconsin Lumberjacks make their debut at Civic Center". APG of Wisconsin. 26 September 2019.
- Dryden, Ben (7 June 2020). "SAYHA, Lumberjacks Enter 3-Year Lease With Spooner Civic Center". DrydenWire.com.
- "The Minnesota Moose Move To Temporary Home At The Spooner Civic Center". DrydenWire.com. 5 January 2021.
- "SIJHL hockey team relocating to U.P., changes name to 'Ironwood Lumberjacks'". upmatters.com. Nexstar Media Group. 7 August 2024.
- "SIJHL approves expansion franchise in Spooner, Wis., for 2019–20" (Press release). SIJHL. 8 February 2019.
- Groeneveld, Dan (12 December 2024). "Ironwood ice arena receives $350,000 grant". uppermichiganssource.com. Gray Local Media.
