= Thunder Bay North Stars =

Junior ice hockey club

- City: Thunder Bay, Ontario
- League: SIJHL
- Founded: 2000
- Home arena: Fort William Gardens
- Colours: Green; Gold; Black
- Owners: Scott and Kris Kellaway
- General manager: Kris Kellaway
- Head coach: Matt Valley
- Website: thunderbaynorthstars.com

Franchise history
- 2000–2002: Thunder Bay Wolves
- 2002–2003: Fort William Wolves
- 2003–2010: Fort William North Stars
- Since 2010: Thunder Bay North Stars

Championships
- League: 2004; 2005; 2006; 2009; 2010; 2019; 2026
- Regional: 2006

The Thunder Bay North Stars is a junior ice hockey club and franchise of the Superior International Junior Hockey League (SIJHL). The team plays its home games at the Fort William Gardens in Thunder Bay, Ontario.

== History ==
After the fall of the Thunder Bay Flyers in 2001, the Superior International Junior Hockey League (SIJHL) was founded. The Thunder Bay Wolves, who had played for a short while in the Thunder Bay Junior B Hockey League, were a founding team, but after one season they changed their name to the Fort William Wolves. Fort William is one of the original names of the city of Thunder Bay. After two rather average seasons, the team rebranded as the North Stars. The team won both the regular season and the playoff titles from 2004 through 2006.

2011 North Stars in action

Their first trip to the Dudley Hewitt Cup Central Canadian Championship in 2004 saw them finish in third place. In the round-robin, the Stars lost to the North Bay Skyhawks of the Northern Ontario Junior Hockey League (NOJHL) 5–4, lost again to the Ontario Provincial Junior A Hockey League (OPJHL)'s Aurora Tigers 4–0, and defeated the NOJHL's Soo Thunderbirds 7–4 to make the semifinal. In the semifinal, the Stars were defeated by the North Bay Skyhawks for the second time in the tournament, losing 3–2.

In their second Dudley Hewitt Cup in 2005, the North Stars finished second in the round-robin, defeating the OPJHL's St. Michael's Buzzers 6–4, losing to the host OPJHL Georgetown Raiders 4–0, and then beating the North Bay Skyhawks 8–2. The semifinal was a rematch with the Buzzers, who avenged their previous loss with a 6–2 victory.

After winning their third straight off league championship in 2006, the Stars competed in their third straight Dudley Hewitt Cup, which they had already qualified for after being selected as the host team. Going into the playoffs, the Stars finished the regular season with a 50–2–0–0 record and the best in the entire Canadian Junior A Hockey League. The Stars took out the K&A Golden Hawks four games to none and then swept the Dryden Ice Dogs in the four-game final for league title. Hosting the 2006 event, the team beat up the NOJHL's Sudbury Jr. Wolves 6–1, but were then defeated by the tournament favourite St. Michael's Buzzers 7–1. In the final round-robin game, the Stars played the SIJHL runner-up Dryden Ice Dogs and beat them 3–0. Fort William and Sudbury both finished with 2–1 records, but the Stars received a bye to the championship game via tiebreaker. Sudbury then defeated Dryden 5–4 in the semifinal to face the North Stars again in the championship. The Stars and Wolves were tied 6–6 at the end of regulation time. The Stars scored quickly in overtime to win their first Dudley Hewitt Cup and a berth in the 2006 Royal Bank Cup national championship. The North Stars were the first team in SIJHL history to have ever won the Dudley Hewitt Cup or play in the Royal Bank Cup.

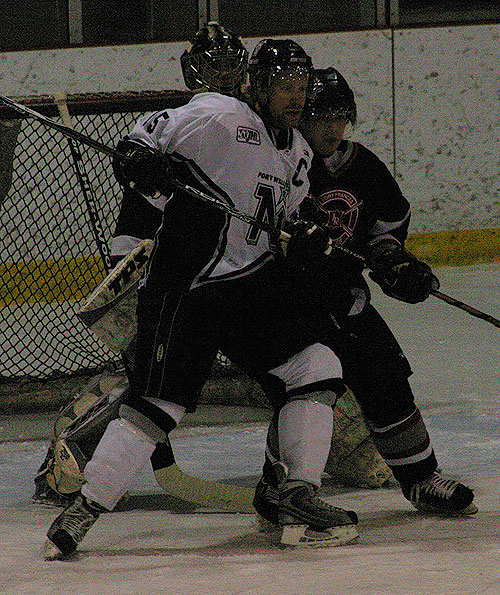
Captain Sean Bassingthwaite screens the net (2008)

The Stars began their first Royal Bank Cup with a loss to the host OPJHL Streetsville Derbys 3–2. The second game saw them defeat the Quebec Junior AAA Hockey League's Joliette Action 4–3 in overtime. In the third game, the British Columbia Hockey League's Burnaby Express beat them 3–2. The Stars defeated the Saskatchewan Junior Hockey League's Yorkton Terriers in a 2–1 victory to advance to a semifinal game. Up 2–0 with less than two minutes to go in the semifinal against the Burnaby Express, the Express scored two quick goals to send the game into overtime. Roughly a minute into the overtime, the Express eliminated the North Stars.

For the 2007–08 season, the North Stars switched to a black, silver, and white colour scheme as opposed to their traditional green, yellow, black, and white.

In October 2010, the North Stars were sold to a new ownership group, led by Doug Gunsinger. The team name was changed to the Thunder Bay North Stars. In 2015, the team ownership was sold to Scott and Kris Kellaway.

Rob DeGagne became head coach 2017–18 and was named SIJHL coach of the year in the same year. DeGagne led the team to win the league championship Bill Salonen Cup in 2018–19. DeGagned stepped down as coach in 2025 but remained with the North Stars as a "senior hockey advisor".

In 2026, the North Stars won their seventh league championship.

Statistics
Season	GP	W	L	T	OTL	GF	GA	Pts	Regular season	Post-season
2001–02	48	4	42	2	0	111	289	10	5th place	Did not qualify
2002–03	52	23	19	5	5	211	193	56	4th place	Lost semifinal against Bulldogs (4:1)
2003–04	48	40	6	1	1	270	119	82	1st place	Won semifinal against Bulldogs (4:0); Won final against Dryden (4:1)
2004–05	48	42	2	4	0	322	66	88	1st place	Won semifinal against K&A First Nations (4:0); Won final against Fort Frances (4:0)
2005–06	52	50	2	0	0	353	101	100	1st place	Won semifinal against K&A First Nations (4:0); Won final against Dryden (4:0); Won regional final against Sudbury (7:6)
2006–07	50	41	6	3	0	307	132	85	1st place	Won semifinal Dryden (4:1); Lost final against Schreiber (4:3)
2007–08	50	35	11	1	3	218	134	74	2nd place	Won semifinal against Thunder Bay (4:1); Lost final against Dryden (4:3)
2008–09	50	39	7	0	4	307	129	82	1st place	Won semifinal against Schreiber (4:3); Won final against Thunder Bay (4:1)
2009–10	52	45	5	0	2	270	104	92	1st place	Won semifinal against Sioux Lookout (4:0); Won final against Dryden (4:1)
2010–11	56	32	21	0	3	191	163	67	4th place	Won quarterfinal against Sioux Lookout (4:1); Lost semifinal against Wisconsin (4:0)
2011–12	56	31	19	0	6	242	156	68	3rd place	Won quarterfinal against Duluth (4:0); Lost semifinal against Wisconsin (4:0)
2012–13	56	28	27	0	1	165	206	57	4th place	Lost quarterfinal against Minnesota (2:1)
2013–14	56	40	11	0	5	253	180	85	2nd place	Lost seeding game against Fort Frances (6:4); Lost semifinal against Minnesota (4:2)
2014–15	56	27	25	0	4	200	227	58	4th place	Won quarterfinal against English River (3:0); Lost semifinal against Fort Frances (4:1)
2014–15	56	28	24	0	4	186	209	60	3rd place	Lost semifinal against Dryden (4:2)
2016–17	56	31	19	0	6	202	183	68	2nd place	Lost semifinal against English River (4:1)
2017–18	56	38	13	0	5	253	164	81	3rd place	Won quarterfinal against Minnesota (3:0); Won semifinal against Thief River Falls (4:1); Lost final against Dryden (4:2)
2018–19	56	49	5	0	2	363	122	100	1st place	Won semifinal against Dryden, (4:1); Won final against Red Lake (4:1)
2019–20	54	34	16	0	4	239	195	72	Cancelled	
2020–21	4	1	2	0	1	17	19	3	Cancelled	
2021–22	41	21	16	3	1	153	147	46	4th place	Won quarterfinal against Wisconsin (3:0); Lost semifinal against Kam River (4:0)
2022–23	54	27	20	3	1	179	159	61	4th place	Won quarterfinal against Red Lake (4:1); Won semifinal against Dryden (4:3); Lost final against Kam River (4:3)
2023–24	49	32	12	3	2	221	153	69	3rd place	Won quarterfinal against Wisconsin (4:0); Lost semifinal against Sioux Lookout (4:1)
2024–25	50	32	12	2	4	235	140	70	3rd place	Won quarterfinal against Fort Frances (4:3); Lost semifinal against Kam River (4:0)
2025–26	48	30	14	0	3	229	142	64	3rd place	Won quarterfinal against Ironwood (4:0); Won semifinal against Dryden (4:1); Won final against Fort Frances (4:3)

Source: "Thunder Bay North Stars statistics and history". hockeydb.com.

== Regional championships ==
Year	Round-robin	Record	Standing	Semifinal	Championship
2004	L, North Bay Skyhawks (NOJHL/Host), 5–6; L, Aurora Tigers (OPJHL), 0–4; W, Soo Thunderbirds (NOJHL), 2–1	1–2–0	3rd of 4	L, North Bay Skyhawks, 2–3	—
2005	W, St. Michael's Buzzers (OPJHL), 6–4; L, Georgetown Raiders (OPJHL/Host), 0–4; W, North Bay Skyhawks (NOJHL), 8–2	2–1–0	2nd of 4	L, St. Michael's Buzzers, 2–6	—
2006; Host	W, Sudbury Jr. Wolves (NOJHL), 6–1; L, St. Michael's Buzzers (OPJHL), 1–7; W, Dryden Ice Dogs (SIJHL), 3–0	2–1–0	1st of 4	—	W, Sudbury Jr. Wolves, 7–6 (OT); Dudley Hewitt Champions
2009	W, Soo Thunderbirds (NOJHL), 2–0; W, Kingston Voyageurs (OPJHL), 1–0; L, Schreiber Diesels (SIJHL/Host), 2–5	2–1–0	2nd of 4	W, Schreiber Diesels, 4–3	L, Kingston Voyageurs, 1–4
2010	OTW, Soo Thunderbirds (NOJHL/Host), 3–2; OTL, Abitibi Eskimos (NOJHL), 3–4; OTL, Oakville Blades (OPJHL), 1–2	1–0–2	2nd of 4	W, Soo Thunderbirds, 3–0	L, Oakville Blades, 1–2
2012; Host	OTL, Stouffville Spirit (OJPHL), 1–2; L, Soo Thunderbirds (NOJHL), 3–4; OTW, Wisconsin Wilderness (SIJHL), 3–4	1–1–1	3rd of 4	L, Soo Thunderbirds, 5–8	—
2018	W, Cochrane Crunch (NOJHL), 4–0; L, Wellington Dukes (OJHL), 1–4; W, Dryden Ice Dogs (SIJHL/Host), 2–1	2–1–0	2nd of 4	L, Wellington Dukes, 3–6	—
2019	L, Cochrane Crunch (NOJHL/Host), 1–4; L, Hearst Lumberjacks (NOJHL), 0–3; L, Oakville Blades (OJHL), 4–9	0–3–0	4th of 4	—	—

== National championships ==
The North Stars have never won a national championship. The 2005–06 North Stars reached the semifinal round of the 2006 Royal Bank Cup before losing in overtime to the Burnaby Express. The 2025–26 North Stars were eliminated from competition at the 2026 Centennial Cup after losing four matches in the prelimary round.

Year	Round-robin	Record	Standing	Semifinal	Championship
2006	L, Streetsville Derbys (host), 2–3; 2OTW, Joliette Action (Eastern), 4–3; L, Burnaby Express (Pacific), 2–3; W, Yorkton Terriers (Western), 2–1	2–2	3rd of 5	OTL, Burnaby Express, 2–3	—

== Notable alumni ==
- Robert Bortuzzo (2005–2006)
- Carter Hutton (2003–2006)
