= Red Lake Miners =

Junior ice hockey franchise

- City: Red Lake, Ontario
- League: SIJHL
- Founded: 2013
- Home arena: Cochenour Arena
- Colours: Canary yellow Black
- General manager: Kurt Walsten
- Head coach: Kurt Walsten
- Website: redlakeminers.com

Franchise history
- 2013–2018: English River Miners
- Since 2018: Red Lake Miners

Championships
- League: 2022

The Red Lake Miners are a Junior ice hockey team in the Superior International Junior Hockey League (SIJHL) based in Red Lake, Ontario.

== History ==
In May 2013, the SIJHL announced that the Ear Falls Eagles would be joining the league for the 2013–14 season. Weeks later, it was announced that the team would instead be called the English River Miners to better represent the entire community.

On September 20, 2013, the Miners played the first game in their franchise's history in Dryden, Ontario, against the Dryden Ice Dogs. The Miners lost 4–2 after giving up two last minute goals, one of which was on an empty net. Nathan Johnson scored the first goal in team history 6:06 into the first period. Greg Harney played the first game in net, making 32 saves. On October 10, 2013, the Miners picked up their first franchise victory, on home ice, defeating the Wisconsin Wilderness by a score of 3–1. Devan Vander Wyk scored the eventual game-winning goal 3:47 into the third period, while Holden Melgoza made 29 saves for the victory.

After finishing last in the SIJHL in their second season, Derek Sweet-Coulter was named head coach for Miners in 2015. One season later, the English River Miners moved to Red Lake, Ontario, with the Cochenour Arena as their home ice. In August 2018, the team rebranded as the Red Lake Miners. Sweet-Coulter led the Miners for four seasons before leaving to coach for the Merritt Centennials of the British Columbia Hockey League after winning the SIJHL Coach of the Year in 2019.

Former professional hockey player Geoff Walker was then hired as general manager and head coach for the 2019–20 season. Walker came to Red Lake after one season leading the Hinton Wildcats in the Western States Hockey League to a 23–19–1–2 record in that team's only season.

The Red Lake Miners were set to host the Dudley Hewitt Cup, a playoff round between the OJHL, NOJHL and the SIJHL to determine the Central Canada representative to the Centennial Cup (Canadian Jr A Championships). However, the Centennial Cup revised the format so the nine leagues champions plus the host City advance. This gives Red Lake a spot in the National Championships.

Statistics
Season	GP	W	L	T	OTL	SOL	Pts	GF	GA	Regular season	Postseason
2013–14	56	26	30	0	0	0	47	185	228	4th place	Won quarterfinal against Dryden (4:2); Lost semifinal against Fort Frances (4:0)
2014–15	56	10	41	0	5	0	25	159	295	5th place	Lost quarterfinal against Thunder Bay (3:0)
2015–16	56	12	37	0	3	4	31	144	239	5th place	Won quarterfinal against Minnesota (3:2); Lost semifinal against Fort Frances (4:0)
2016–17	56	31	21	0	1	3	66	220	197	3rd place	Won semifinal against Thunder Bay (4:1); Lost final against Dryden (4:0)
2017–18	56	28	23	0	1	4	61	188	209	4th place	Lost quarterfinal against Fort Frances (3:1)
2018–19	56	38	15	0	3	0	79	278	193	2nd place	Won semifinal against Thief River Falls (4:1); Lost final against Thunder Bay (4:1)
2019–20	55	32	18	0	3	2	69	196	176	2nd place	Playoffs cancelled
2020–21	4	1	2	0	1	0	3	13	16	Season cancelled	Playoffs cancelled
2021–22	37	28	6	0	2	1	59	210	112	2nd place	Won semifinal against Dryden (4:2); Won final against Kam River (4:2)
2022–23	52	22	25	0	3	2	51	168	188	5th place	Lost quarterfinal against Thunder Bay (4:1)
2023–24	49	29	18	0	2	0	60	213	137	5th place	Won quarterfinals against Dryden (4:1); Lost semifinal against Kam River (4:0)
2024–25	50	22	21	2	5	0	51	159	171	5th place	Won quarterfinal against Sioux Lookout (4:3); Lost semifinal against Dryden (4:0)
2025–26	48	5	42	0	0	1	11	85	266	7th place	Lost quarterfinal against Dryden (4:0)

Sources:
- "English River Miners hockey team statistics and history". hockeydb.com.
- "Red Lake Miners hockey team statistics and history". hockeydb.com.

== Centennial Cup ==
After winning their first league championship in 2022, the Miners went on to compete at the 2022 Centennial Cup national championship tournament in Estevan, Saskatchewan. They were eliminated from contention after losing to the Brooks Bandits of the AJHL (11:2), Pickering Panthers of the OJHL (9:2), Collège Français de Longueuil of the QJHL (6:1), and Estevan Bruins of the SJHL (6:2). The final playoff round was between the Brooks Bandits and the Pickering Panthers, with the Brooks Bandits winning by a score of 4:1.

Year	Round-robin	Record	Standing	Quarterfinal	Semifinal	Championship
2022	L, Pickering Panthers (OJHL), 9:2; L, Brooks Bandits (AJHL), 11:4; L, Estevan Bruins (SJHL), 6:2; L, Longueuil Collège Français (QJHL), 6:1	0-4-0	5th of 5 Pool A	Did not qualify	Did not qualify	Did not qualify
