= Fort Frances Borderland Thunder =

- City: Fort Frances, Ontario, Canada
- League: Superior International Junior Hockey League
- Operated: 2001-2005
- Home arena: Fort Frances Memorial Sports Center
- Colours: Black, Purple, and White

The Borderland Thunder are a defunct Junior "A" ice hockey team from Fort Frances, Ontario, Canada. They were a part of the Superior International Junior Hockey League.

== History ==
Despite four successful season in the SIJHL and a league title, the Thunder have opted to sit on the sidelines of Canadian Junior hockey. Although they still had an open door to re-enter the Thunder Bay-based league, they have applied the past three seasons for entry into the Manitoba Junior Hockey League .

A return to the SIJHL is unlikely for the Borderland Thunder, as their place in the SIJHL has since been succeeded by the Fort Frances Jr. Sabres as of the 2007–08 season.

== Season-by-season results ==
Season	GP	W	L	T	OTL	GF	GA	P	Results	Playoffs
2001-02	48	28	11	9	0	215	142	65	1st SIJHL	
2002-03	52	33	12	5	2	228	162	73	1st SIJHL	Won League
2003-04	48	24	17	3	4	188	164	55	3rd SIJHL	
2004-05	48	30	15	3	0	184	124	63	2nd SIJHL	Lost final
Totals	196	115	55	20	6	815	592		0.653	

=== Playoffs ===
- 2002 Lost final

Fort Frances Borderland Thunder defeated Thunder Bay Bulldogs 4-games-to-3
Dryden Ice Dogs defeated Fort Frances Borderland Thunder 4-games-to-none

- 2003 Won League, lost Dudley Hewitt Cup semi-final

Fort Frances Borderland Thunder defeated Dryden Ice Dogs 4-games-to-none
Fort Frances Borderland Thunder defeated Thunder Bay Bulldogs 4-games-to-1 SIJHL CHAMPIONS
Third in Dudley Hewitt Cup round robin (1-2)
Wellington Dukes (OPJHL) defeated Fort Frances Borderland Thunder 3-2 in semi-final

- 2004 Lost semi-final

Dryden Ice Dogs defeated Fort Frances Borderland Thunder 4-games-to-3

- 2005 Lost final

Fort Frances Borderland Thunder defeated Dryden Ice Dogs 4-games-to-none
Fort William North Stars defeated Fort Frances Borderland Thunder 4-games-to-none
