= Thief River Falls Norskies =

Junior ice hockey team

Thief River Falls Junior A
- City: Thief River Falls, Minnesota
- League: Independent
- Founded: 2016
- Home arena: Ralph Engelstad Arena
- Owner(s): Stoked LLC
- General manager: Open
- Head coach: Open

Franchise history
- 2016–2020: Thief River Falls

The Thief River Falls Norskies were an American Junior A ice hockey team based in Thief River Falls, Minnesota. They participate in the Superior International Junior Hockey League, a Canadian Junior Hockey League member.

== History ==
The Norskies were established in 2016 through the efforts of local investors, including former National Hockey League player Tim Bergland. The team's name, "Norskies," was selected through a contest in nearby elementary schools. The ownership group chose this name as it pays homage to the Norwegian heritage in northwestern Minnesota.

Competing from the 2016–2017 season onwards, the team hosted their home games at the Ralph Engelstad Arena. The competition marked the beginning of their journey in the ice hockey scene.

The team were a casualty of the COVID-19 pandemic.

== Season-by-season results ==
Season	GP	W	L	OTL	SOL	GF	GA	Pts	Finish	Playoffs
2016–17	56	30	21	2	3	219	205	65	4th of 6, SIJHL	Lost Play-in Series, 1–3 (Lakers)
2017–18	56	41	11	2	2	211	133	86	2nd of 6, SIJHL	Lost Semifinals, 1–4 (North Stars)
2018–19	56	31	20	4	1	224	173	67	3rd of 6, SIJHL	Won Play-in Series, 3–0 (Iron Rangers); Lost Semifinals, 1–4 (Miners)
2019–20	54	30	21	3	0	213	193	63	3rd of 6, SIJHL	Season cancelled
