= Sioux Lookout Bombers =

Junior ice hockey team

- City: Sioux Lookout
- League: SIJHL
- Founded: 2022
- Home arena: Sioux Lookout Memorial Arena
- Colours: Hunter green Yellow-orange
- Owners: Matt Cairns; Joe Cassidy; Austen Hoey; Christine Hoey
- General manager: Austen Hoey
- Head coach: Joel Litt-Jukes
- Website: bombershockey.ca

The Sioux Lookout Bombers is a junior ice hockey franchise of the Superior International Junior Hockey League (SIJHL) based in Sioux Lookout, Ontario, Canada. It debuted as an expansion franchise in the 2022–23 SIJHL season.

== History ==
The Bombers debuted as an expansion franchise in the 2022–23 SIJHL season. The team finished its inaugural regular season in third place overall. They were eliminated from the playoffs after losing 4:3 to the Wisconsin Lumberjacks in the first round.

Despite finishing the 2023–24 regular season in second place, the Bombers swept the first place Kam River Fighting Walleye in the final round of the playoffs to win the league championship Bill Salonen Cup. The Bombers advanced to compete in the 2024 Centennial Cup national championship tournament in Oakville, Ontario. The Bombers were eliminated after losing four games in the preliminary round.

The Bombers finished the 2024–25 regular season in fourth place overall and were eliminated from the playoffs after losing 4:3 to the Red Lake Miners in the first round.

Statistics
Season	GP	W	L	T	OTL	SOL	GF	GA	Pts	Finish	Playoffs
2022–23	52	29	20	0	3	0	189	156	63	3rd place	Lost quarterfinal against Wisconsin (3:1)
2023–24	49	35	10	0	2	2	200	113	74	2nd place	Won quarterfinal against Fort Frances (4:0); Won semifinal against Thunder Bay (4:1); Won final against Kam River
2024–25	50	31	14	2	3	0	200	133	67	4th place	Lost quarterfinal against Red Lake (4:3)
2025–26	48	24	20	0	2	2	181	140	52	5th place	Lost quarterfinal against Kam River (4:1)

Source: "Sioux Lookout Bombers statistics and history". hockeydb.com.

== Sioux Lookout Flyers ==
Sioux Lookout Flyers
- City: Sioux Lookout
- League: SIJHL
- Operated: 2008–2012
- Home arena: Sioux Lookout Memorial Arena
- Colours: Princeton orange Black

The Sioux Lookout Flyers joined the SIJHL as an expansion franchise in the 2008–09 SIJHL season. The Flyers mark the first major level hockey in the town since the Intermediate leagues of the 1970s.

The Flyers are Ontario Junior hockey's most Northerly club at 50° 06′ North.

On 19 September 2008, the Flyers lost their first ever game to the Schreiber Diesels in Schreiber, Ontario by a score of 10-2. On 26 September, the Flyers played their first home game and lost 6-2 to the defending SIJHL champion Dryden Ice Dogs.

On 12 November 2008, sixteen games into a winless season, the ownership of the team pulled the plug on the franchise. Two days later, the town of Sioux Lookout held a town meeting in regards to the team and elected to save the team as a community with the help of a Winnipeg-based investor. The team went on hiatus for three games, but returned to action on 19 November.

The Flyers won their first ever game on 2 January 2009, defeating the Dryden Ice Dogs, on the road, 5-4 in overtime. The victory was Sioux Lookout's 30th league game.

Sioux Lookout Flyers 2008–2012

Original Flyers uniform 2011

On 3 October 2012, the Flyers dropped out of the 2012–13 SIJHL season after only three games. The Flyers cited being "unable to continue in a competitive and professional manner for the season" as their reason for withdrawal. The Flyers claimed it was only going to be a one-year absence to restructure. In the spring of 2013, the team's official Facebook page reflected that the team was not returning.

Statistics
Season	GP	W	L	OTL	SOL	GF	GA	Pts	Finish	Playoffs
2008–09	50	2	46	0	2	97	367	6	6th overall	Lost quarterfinal against Fort Frances (3:0)
2009–10	52	20	27	3	2	159	210	45	3rd overall	Lost in 2nd round against Fort William North Stars (4:0)
2010–11	56	12	38	4	2	136	238	30	5th overall	Lost quarterfinal against Thunder Bay (4:1)
2011–12	56	25	29	1	1	202	227	52	5th overall	Lost quarterfinal against Dryden (4:1)
2012–13	3	0	3	0	0	4	24	0	7th overall	Folded mid-season

Source: "Sioux Lookout Flyers statistics and history". hockeydb.com.

== Sources ==
- "Sioux Lookout Flyers hockey team statistics and history". hockeydb.com.
- "Sioux Lookout Flyers all-time player list". hockeydb.com.
- Laskaris, Sam (15 January 2020). "Junior A hockey action in northern First Nation fuels dreams of owning a franchise". windspeaker.com. Aboriginal Multi-Media Society.
- Jeffrey, Kevin (13 June 2023). "Roy, Bombers looking ahead to second SIJHL campaign". Dougall Media.
- "VIDEO: Sioux Lookout Bombers turn to 26-year-old head coach". TBNewsWatch.com. Dougall Media. 11 June 2026.
