= Dryden Ice Dogs =

Junior ice hockey club

- City: Dryden, Ontario
- League: SIJHL
- Founded: 2001
- Home arena: Dryden Memorial Arena
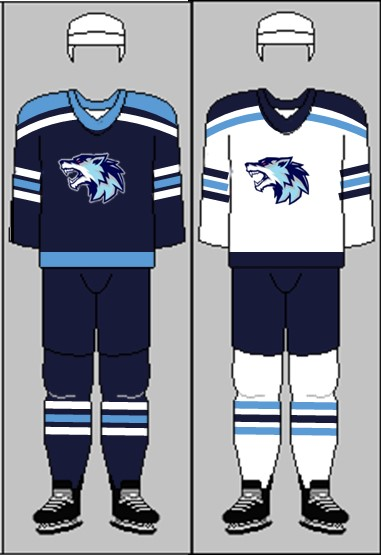
- Colours
- General manager: Delroy Montaque
- Head coach: Delroy Montaque
- Media: sijhl.tv
- Website: drydenicedogs.com

Championships
- League: 2002; 2008; 2017; 2018

The Dryden Ice Dogs are a junior ice hockey team in the Superior International Junior Hockey League (SIJHL) based in Dryden, Ontario. It is one of the charter teams of the SIJHL.

== Arena ==
The team plays its home games at Dryden Memorial Arena, which was built in 1978–79. The building underwent major renovations between 2020 and 2023.

== History ==
The Ice Dogs were one of the original five SIJHL teams and have the distinction of being the first club to win the championship Bill Salonen Cup, under the management of Bill Salonen, in the inaugural season. They went on to win subsequent league championships in 2008, 2017, and 2018.

In 2023, the Ice Dogs hired an historian to curate the history of the club in a book that was expected to be completed during the 2023–24 season.

Statistics
Season	GP	W	L	T	OTL	GF	GA	Pts	Finish	Playoffs
2001–02	48	25	15	8	0	221	169	58	3rd SIJHL	Won League
2002–03	52	28	20	2	2	248	206	60	3rd SIJHL	Lost semifinals
2003–04	48	28	11	6	3	186	137	65	2nd SIJHL	Lost finals
2004–05	48	24	24	0	0	168	135	48	3rd SIJHL	Lost semifinals
2005–06	52	35	14	1	2	247	159	73	2nd SIJHL	Lost finals
2006–07	50	23	23	4	0	216	212	50	4th SIJHL	Lost semifinals
2007–08	50	36	11	1	2	240	149	75	1st SIJHL	Won League
2008–09	50	20	25	—	5	170	210	45	5th SIJHL	Lost quarterfinals
2009–10	52	38	9	—	5	235	148	81	2nd SIJHL	Lost finals
2010–11	56	34	20	—	2	184	152	70	3rd SIJHL	Lost finals
2011–12	56	25	24	—	7	212	200	57	4th SIJHL	Lost semifinals
2012–13	56	28	25	—	3	189	197	59	3rd SIJHL	Lost semifinals
2013–14	56	21	30	—	5	210	273	47	5th SIJHL	Lost quarterfinals, 2–4 Miners
2014–15	56	30	21	—	5	244	204	65	3rd SIJHL	Won semifinals, 4–2 Iron Rangers; Lost League Finals, 2–4 (Lakers) (Note: Advanced to Dudley Hewitt as league runner-up as Fort Francis qualified as host.)
2015–16	56	33	15	—	8	216	162	70	2nd of 5 SIJHL	Won semifinals, 4–2 (North Stars); Lost League Finals, 2–4 (Lakers)
2016–17	56	45	7	—	4	297	148	94	1st of 6 SIJHL	Won semifinals, 4–0 (Lakers); Won League Finals, 4–0 (Miners); SIJHL Champions
2017–18	56	40	8	—	8	272	148	88	1st of 6 SIJHL	Won semifinals, 4–1 (Lakers); Won League Finals, 4–2 (North Stars); SIJHL Champions
2018–19	56	29	20	—	7	265	195	65	4th of 6 SIJHL	Won quarterfinals, 3–0 (Lakers); Lost semifinals, 1–4 (North Stars)
2019–20	55	25	25	—	5	191	202	55	Season cancelled	
2020–21	4	3	1	—	0	16	13	6	Season cancelled	
2021–22	46	26	15	3	1	213	136	56	3rd place	Won quarterfinal against Fort Frances (3:0); Lost semifinal against Red Lake (4:2)
2022–23	54	37	15	1	0	229	149	76	2nd place	Won quarterfinal against Fort Frances (4:1); Lost semifinal against Thunder Bay (4:3)
2023–24	49	31	16	1	1	186	147	64	4th place	Lost quarterfinal against Red Lake (4:1)
2024–25	50	33	9	2	2	224	136	70	1st place	Won semifinal against Red Lake (4:0); Lost final against Kam River (4:2)
2025–26	48	34	10	0	3	191	120	72	2nd place	Won quarterfinal against Red Lake (4:0); Lost semifinal against Thunder Bay (4:1)

Source: "Dryden Ice Dogs statistics and history". hockeydb.com.

=== Playoffs ===
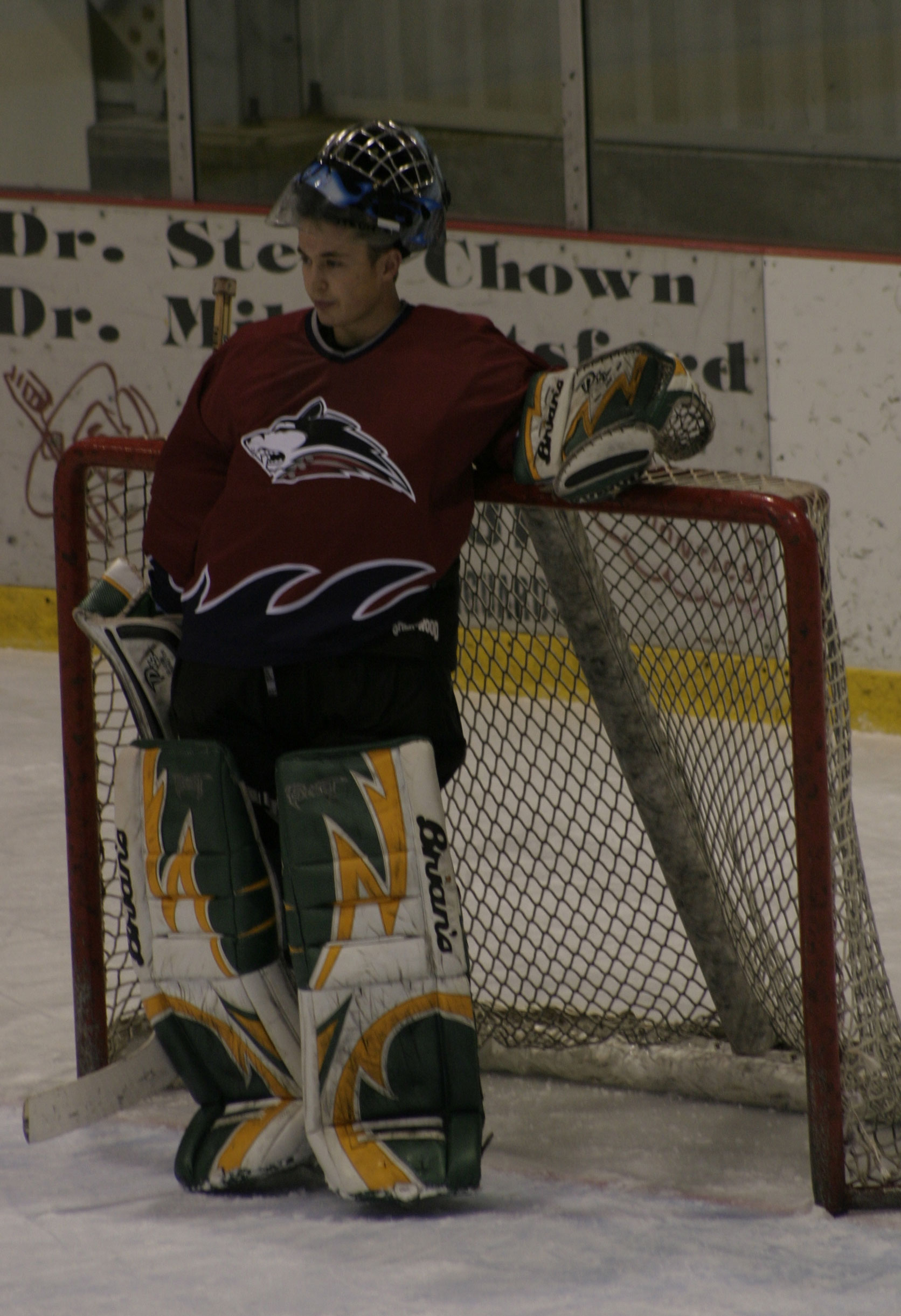
Goalie Graeme Harrington relaxes during a game (2007)

- 2002 Won League, lost Dudley Hewitt Cup

Dryden Ice Dogs defeated Nipigon Featherman Hawks 4-games-to-none
Dryden Ice Dogs defeated Fort Frances Borderland Thunder 4-games-to-none SIJHL Champions
Rayside-Balfour Sabrecats (NOJHL) defeated Dryden Ice Dogs 2-games-to-none

- 2003 Lost semi-final

Fort Frances Borderland Thunder defeated Dryden Ice Dogs 4-games-to-none

- 2004 Lost final

Dryden Ice Dogs defeated Fort Frances Borderland Thunder 4-games-to-3
Fort William North Stars defeated Dryden Ice Dogs 4-games-to-1

- 2005 Lost semi-final

Fort Frances Borderland Thunder defeated Dryden Ice Dogs 4-games-to-none

- 2006 Lost final, lost Dudley Hewitt Cup semi-final

Dryden Ice Dogs defeated Schreiber Diesels 4-games-to-none
Fort William North Stars defeated Dryden Ice Dogs 4-games-to-none
Third in Dudley Hewitt Cup round robin (1-2)
Sudbury Jr. Wolves (NOJHL) defeated Dryden Ice Dogs 5-4 in semi-final

- 2007 Lost semi-final

Fort William North Stars defeated Dryden Ice Dogs 4-games-to-1

- 2008 Won League, lost Dudley Hewitt Cup semi-final

Dryden Ice Dogs defeated Schreiber Diesels 4-games-to-3
Dryden Ice Dogs defeated Fort William North Stars 4-games-to-1 SIJHL CHAMPIONS
Third in Dudley Hewitt Cup round robin (1-2)
Newmarket Hurricanes (OPJHL) defeated Dryden Ice Dogs 2-1 OT in semi-final

- 2009 Lost quarter-final

Schreiber Diesels defeated Dryden Ice Dogs 3-games-to-none

- 2010 Lost final

First in round robin (4-0) vs. Fort William North Stars and Sioux Lookout Flyers
Dryden Ice Dogs defeated Fort Frances Lakers 4-games-to-2
Fort William North Stars defeated Dryden Ice Dogs 4-games-to-1

- 2011 Lost final

Dryden Ice Dogs defeated Duluth Clydesdales 4-games-to-none
Dryden Ice Dogs defeated Fort Frances Lakers 4-games-to-2
Wisconsin Wilderness defeated Dryden Ice Dogs 4-games-to-none

- 2012 Lost semi-final

Dryden Ice Dogs defeated Sioux Lookout Flyers 4-games-to-1
Fort Frances Lakers defeated Dryden Ice Dogs 4-games-to-none

- 2013 Lost semi-final

Fort Frances Lakers defeated Dryden Ice Dogs 4-games-to-3

== Regional championships ==
The Dudley Hewitt Cup (also known as the Dudley Hewitt Memorial Trophy) was awarded annually from 1971–2019 to the championship Junior 'A' ice hockey team for the Central/East region of Canada. That region initially extended east from Ontario to The Maritimes. Later, the field of competition was limited to the championship teams from the Ontario Junior Hockey League (OJHL), Northern Ontario Junior Hockey League (NOJHL) and Superior International Junior Hockey League (SIJHL), and a preselected host team. The tournament format began with a round-robin to determine seeding, followed by a semifinal elimination round played between the second and third seeds, followed by a final best-of-3 elimination round played between the first-place team and the winner of the semifinal. The winners of the Dudley Hewitt Cup went on to compete for the national championship Centennial Cup.

The Dudley Hewitt Cup was named after George Dudley and W. A. Hewitt, who served as administrators for the Ontario Hockey Association and are inductees of the Hockey Hall of Fame.

Year	Champion	Finalist	Series	Scores	
2002	Rayside-Balfour Sabrecats	Dryden Ice Dogs	2–0 (Best of 3)	4–3 (2OT), 7–3	
Year	Round-robin	Record	Standing	Semifinal	Championship
2015	L, Soo Thunderbirds 1–8; L, Toronto Patriots 0–6; L, Fort Frances Lakers 3–5	0–3–0	4th of 4	Did not advance	
2017	OTW, Georgetown Raiders 5–4; L, Powassan Voodoos 3–4; L, Trenton Golden Hawks 4–10	1–2–0	4th of 4	Did not advance	
2018 host	W, Wellington Dukes 4–1; W, Cochrane Crunch 3–0; L, Thunder Bay North Stars 1–2	2–1–0	1st of 4	—	L, Wellington 4–7

== Additional reading ==
- Davidson, Tim (29 August 2024). "Ice Dogs open training camp today". CKDR. Acadia Broadcasting.
- Davidson, Tim (5 September 2024). "Ice Dogs host the Sunset Series this weekend". CKDR. Acadia Broadcasting.
- Goater, C. J. (29 August 2024). "Dryden GM Ice Dogs unveiling new team branding". Kenora Online. Acadia Broadcasting.
- Davidson, Tim (23 April 2024). "Gushue hired as Ice Dogs new head coach". CKDR. Acadia Broadcasting.
- Davidson, Tim (13 September 2024). "SIJHL begins regular season tonight". Kenora Online. Acadia Broadcasting.
- Moskalyk, Gary (11 September 2024). "24-25 season preview: Dryden GM Ice Dogs". drydenicedogs.com (Press release). Dryden Ice Dogs.
- "SIJHL cancels 2020–21 season". SIJHL (Press release). 1 March 2021.
- Fleury, Clint (13 March 2023). "Dryden Memorial Arena's second rink expected to be complete by October". NWONewsWatch.com. Dougall Media.
- Fleury, Clint (25 July 2024). "Dryden receives funding for recreation centre renovations". NWONewsWatch.com. Dougall Media.
- Fleury, Clint (23 September 2022). "Dryden GM continues to support the Ice Dogs". NWONewsWatch.com. Dougall Media.
- Punkari, Lucas (2 May 2024). "Gushue ready to lead Ice Dogs into new era". NWONewsWatch.com. Dougall Media.
- Dunick, Leith (10 April 2024). "Ice Dogs, longtime coach Kurt Walsten part ways". NWONewsWatch.com. Dougall Media.
- Russon, Randy (30 December 2022). "Dog days in Dryden for defenceman turned assistant coach Jake Gushue". Sault This Week. Postmedia.
- "The story behind our 2021/22 warm-up jerseys". drydenicedogs.com. 22 September 2021.
- Walters, Jeff (30 November 2020). "Dryden Ont. 'Lug's Locker Room #10' named after family who died in collision". CBC News. CBC/Radio-Canada.
- Ebbeling, Mike (21 September 2020). "No Timeline To Reopen Dryden Memorial Arena". CKDR. Acadia Broadcasting.
- "Dryden group raising money for arena repairs the city can't afford". CBC News. CBC/Radio-Canada. 15 May 2017.
- Dunick, Leith (12 March 2025). "Ice Dogs clinch SIJHL's top seed". TBNewsWatch.com. Dougall Media.
- Dunick, Leith (15 April 2025). "Fighting Walleye, Ice Dogs to tangle in SIJHL final". TBNewsWatch.com. Dougall Media.
- "SIJHL trophy namesake dies". Fort Frances Times. 22 October 2025.
- Ekman, Maya (17 November 2026). "Home of Dryden's Ice Dogs to see big renovations". Fort Frances Times.
