= Kam River Fighting Walleye =

Junior ice hockey team

- City: Oliver Paipoonge
- League: SIJHL
- Founded: 2020
- Home arena: NorWest Arena
- Colours
- Owner: Dorsal Fin Entertainment Group
- General manager: Ryan Carlson
- Head coach: Ryan Carlson
- Website: fightingwalleye.com

Championships
- League: 2023; 2025

The Kam River Fighting Walleye is a junior ice hockey franchise of the Superior International Junior Hockey League (SIJHL). The team plays its home games at the NorWest arena in Oliver Paipoonge, Ontario.

== Team identity ==
The team gets its name from its junior B predecessor that played in the Lakehead Junior Hockey League from 2017 to 2020. Before joining the SIJHL in 2020, the team's logo was notably similar to that of the Toledo Walleye of the ECHL; so much so that the Toledo Walleye considered it to be a trademark infringement and the Kam River Fighting Walleye agreed to change it.

Clockwise from upper left: Toledo Walleye, Thunder Bay Fighting Walleye (defunct former LJHL franchise), Kam River Fighting Walleye (before), Kam River Fighting Walleye (after). Kam River adopted the new emblem after the Toledo Walleye of the ECHL told them to cease and desist.

== Franchise history ==
The team's inaugural 2020–21 season was cancelled with only 4 regular season games played due to the COVID-19 pandemic. The following year, the team hosted a pre-season exhibition tournament called the Teleco Cup. The team went on to finish the 2021–22 regular season in first place before losing to the Red Lake Miners in the final round of the playoffs. The team won the league championship Bill Salonen Cup in the 2022–23 SIJHL season. The team then advanced to the 2023 Centennial Cup national junior A championship tournament and were eliminated in the preliminary round.

In 2024, it was reported that the team had set an all-time league record with 104 shots on goal during a single match against the Kenora Islanders in which the Fighting Walleye won by a score of 11–0. It was further reported that this may have also been a record for the Kenora Islanders goaltender, Kaden King, who made 93 saves. According to the official game report, the Walleye made 86 shots on goal, of which the Islanders' goaltender stopped 75.

Season-by-season record
Season	GP	W	L	OTL	SOL	Pts	Finish	Playoffs
2020–21	4	3	1	0	0	6	Season cancelled	
2021–22	37	28	6	2	1	59	1st overall	Won semifinal against Thunder Bay (4:0); Lost final against Red Lake (2:4)
2022–23	54	40	11	1	1	83	1st overall	Won semifinal against Wisconsin (4:1); Won final against Thunder Bay (4:3)
2023–24	49	39	9	1	0	79	1st overall	Won quarterfinal against Kenora (4:0); Won semifinal against Red Lake (4:0); Lost final against Sioux Lookout (0:4)
2024–25	50	36	13	1	0	77	2nd overall	Won quarterfinal against Wisconsin (4:0); Won semifinal against Thunder Bay (4:0); Won final against Dryden (4:2)
2025–26	48	29	13	3	3	64	4th overall	Won quarterfinal against Sioux Lookout (4:1); Lost semifinal against Fort Frances (4:2)

Source: "Kam River Fighting Walleye hockey team statistics and history". hockeydb.com.

== National championships ==
Year	Round-robin	Record	Standing	Quarterfinal	Semifinal	Championship
2023	Lost, Battlefords North Stars (SJHL), 1–4; Lost, Portage Terriers (Host), 2–12; Lost, Steinbach Pistons (MJHL), 2–5; Lost, Collingwood Blues (OJHL), 1-4	0-0-4-0	5th of 5 Group B	Did not qualify	Did not qualify	Did not qualify
2025	OTW, Trenton Golden Hawks (OJHL), 2–1; L, Grande Prairie Storm (AJHL), 1–3; L, Northern Manitoba Blizzard (MJHL), 2–3; L, Greater Sudbury Cubs (NOJHL), 1-2	0-1-3-0	5th of 5 Group A	Did not qualify	Did not qualify	Did not qualify

== Sources ==
- Punkari, Lucas (9 July 2024). "Fighting Walleye announce new head coach". TBNewsWatch.com. Dougall Media.
- Dunick, Leith (5 June 2024). "Messier moves on from Fighting Walleye". TBNewsWatch.com. Dougall Media.
- Jeffrey, Kevin (6 March 2024). "Islanders navigating rocky first season". NWONewsWatch.com. Dougall Media.
- Dunick, Leith (17 July 2023). "Fighting Walleye searching for new head coach". TBNewsWatch.com. Dougall Media.
- Dunick, Leith (9 November 2022). "Valley 'blindsided' by Kam River Fighting Walleye firing". TBNewsWatch.com. Dougall Media.
- Ketonen, Kris (28 July 2023). "Jesse Messier hired as new head coach of the Fighting Walleye, says communication will be key". CBC News. CBC/Radio-Canada.
- Dunick, Leith (20 January 2021). "Arena closure leaves Fighting Walleye homeless". TBNewsWatch.com. Dougall Media.
- Dunick, Leith (5 November 2022). "Fighting Walleye fire coach Matt Valley". TBNewsWatch.com. Dougall Media.
- Dunick, Leith (5 September 2020). "Fighting Walleye to play in Oliver Paipoonge". TBNewsWatch.com. Dougall Media.
- Punkari, Lucas (22 September 2024). "Fighting Walleye score 16 goals in win". TBNewsWatch.com. Dougall Media.
- Dunick, Leith (22 October 2024). "Fighting Walleye bring Wintoneak back into SIJHL fold". NWONewsWatch.com. Dougall Media.
- "Wintoneak back in the SIJHL". The Chronicle-Journal. 23 October 2024.
- Dunick, Leith (26 October 2024). "Fighting Walleye win in Wintoneak's debut". TBNewsWatch.com. Dougall Media.
- Punkari, Lucas (10 July 2024). "New Fighting Walleye head coach excited for opportunity". TBNewsWatch.com. Dougall Media.
- Dunick, Leith (17 October 2024). "Lee resigns as Fighting Walleye coach". TBNewsWatch.com. Dougall Media.
- Villagracia, Reuben (14 November 2024). "Wintoneak is right ingredient for Fighting Walleye". The Chronicle-Journal.
- Dunick, Leith (27 April 2025). "Ice Dogs force Game 6 with overtime win over Walleye". NWONewsWatch.com. Dougall Media.
- "Centennial Cup taps Cubs' Moore as most sportsmanlike". Sudbury.com. Village Media. 21 May 2025.
- Dunick, Leith (23 April 2026). "Wintoneak won't return behind Fighting Walleye bench". TBNewsWatch.com. Dougall Media.
- Dunick, Leith (24 April 2026). "Wintoneak says lack of communication led to firing". TBNewsWatch.com. Dougall Media.
- "VIDEO: Kam River Fighting Walleye hire new head coach". TBNewsWatch.com. Dougall Media. 22 July 2026.
- Jeffrey, Kevin (4 October 2026). "Fighting Walleye new head coach optimistic heading into busy October schedule - Your ThunderBay". yourthunderbay.ca. Acadia Broadcasting.
