= Minnesota Iron Rangers =

American junior ice hockey team

- City: Hoyt Lakes, Minnesota
- League: Superior International Junior Hockey League
- Founded: 2011
- Home arena: Hoyt Lakes Arena
- Colors: Blue, white, and red
- General manager: Todd Kreibich (2017-18)
- Head coach: Todd Kreibich (2017-18)

Franchise history
- 2011–2012: Iron Range Ironheads
- 2012–2019: Minnesota Iron Rangers

The Minnesota Iron Rangers were an American junior ice hockey team based in Hoyt Lakes, Minnesota. Originally named Iron Range Ironheads, the Iron Rangers played in the Canadian-based Superior International Junior Hockey League.

== Iron Range Ironheads (2011–2012) ==
On July 12, 2011, USA Hockey granted the Superior International Junior Hockey League an expansion team in Chisholm, Minnesota, in the Iron Range region of northern Minnesota to begin play in September 2011. The Iron Range Ironheads' coach and general manager was Steve Chelios, brother of former NHL defenseman Chris Chelios. Steve was the franchise's managing partner, along with a group of investors from Vancouver, British Columbia.

With their first game being rescheduled twice, the Ironheads finally stepped on the ice for their inaugural game on October 8, 2011. Their first game was against the Dryden Ice Dogs in Dryden, Ontario. Shamus O'Neill scored the franchise's first goal at 18:51 of the first period, but the Ice Dogs went on to win the game 5–1.

On December 10, 2011, the Ironheads defeated the Fort Frances Lakers 3–2 at Northwoods Arena in Cloquet to win their first SIJHL game.

== Iron Rangers (2012–2019) ==
In June 2012, Steve Chelios was released and the team was renamed the Minnesota Iron Rangers. With the name change came a move to Hoyt Lakes, Minnesota, playing their games at Hoyt Lakes Arena. The Minnesota Iron Rangers name was previously used by a team playing in the American Hockey Association based in Hibbing, Minnesota. Chris Walby was hired as the team's head coach and general manager on June 19, 2012.

The team was close to another relocation just one season after moving. Members of the community raised $30,000 to keep the team in Hoyt Lakes. The team then had their best season, falling in game seven of the 2014 Bill Salonen Cup Finals. Several players were honored by the SIJHL, winning post-season awards.

In 2019, after several more seasons of ownership and player recruitment issues, the Iron Rangers ceased operations for the 2019–20 season while the league searched for new owners.

== Alumni ==
Several players have moved on to college ice hockey programs. In June 2015, the Iron Ranges announced that eight members of the previous season would be playing for NCAA college hockey programs in the Fall.

== Season-by-season results ==
Season	GP	W	L	OTL	SOL	GF	GA	Pts	Results	Playoffs
2011–12	56	9	45	2	—	155	432	20	7th of 7	Lost Survivor Series, 0–2 (Clydesdales)
2012–13	56	26	28	2	—	161	194	54	5th of 5	Won Quarterfinals 2–1 (North Stars); Lost Semifinals, 0-4 (Wilderness)
2013–14	56	36	14	6	—	237	168	78	3rd of 6	Won Quarterfinals, 4–0 (Wilderness); Won Semifinals, 4–2 (North Stars); Lost Finals, 3–4 (Lakers)
2014–15	56	30	20	5	1	246	198	66	2nd of 5	Lost Semifinals, 2–4 (Ice Dogs)
2015–16	56	21	31	2	2	178	223	46	4th of 5	Lost Survivor Series, 2–3 (Miners)
2016–17	56	7	46	3	0	144	336	17	6th of 6	Did not qualify
2017–18	56	6	47	1	2	144	336	15	6th of 6	Lost Quarterfinals, 0–3 (North Stars)
2018–19	56	3	53	0	0	91	478	6	6th of 6	Lost Quarterfinals, 0–3 (Norskies)
