= Superior International Junior Hockey League =

Junior A ice hockey league

- Current season or competition: 2026–27 SIJHL season
- Regions: Northwestern Ontario; Michigan
- Commissioner: Dean Thibodeau
- Founded: 2001
- No. of teams: 7
- Associated titles: Centennial Cup; Dudley Hewitt Cup
- Recent champions: Thunder Bay North Stars (7th) (2025–26)
- Most successful club: Thunder Bay North Stars (7)
- Headquarters: Thunder Bay, Ontario
- Website: sijhlhockey.com

The Superior International Junior Hockey League (SIJHL) is a junior A ice hockey league and a member of the Canadian Junior Hockey League (CJHL) and Hockey Canada. The league operates in the Canadian province of Ontario and the U.S. state of Michigan. Winners of the SIJHL playoffs compete for the Centennial Cup, the Canadian Junior A championship. Since the COVID-19 pandemic, the winner of each tier 2 junior A league across Canada shows up to the national championship.

== History ==
=== Background ===
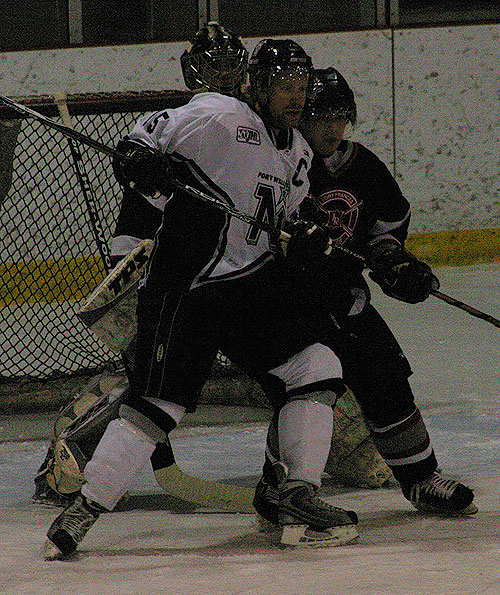
North Stars Sean Bassingthwaite battles with Fort Frances player (2008)

Founded in 2001, the SIJHL is successor of several former Thunder Bay junior A hockey leagues and teams. The Fort William War Veterans were the first representatives of the Thunder Bay region, winning the 1922 Memorial Cup as Canadian National Junior A Champions. Although there is not abundant information on the subject, the Thunder Bay Junior Hockey League may date back to the War Veterans and existed until 1980. From 1980 until 2000, the region (Hockey Northwestern Ontario) was represented by a single team at the junior A level: the Thunder Bay Flyers. The Flyers played their regular season games in the United States Hockey League (USHL), a USA Hockey junior A league, and returned to Canada for the playoffs. The Flyers won the Dudley Hewitt Cup as Central Canadian Junior Champions in 1989, 1991, 1992, and 1995. The Flyers were also National Champions in 1989 and 1992, winning the Centennial Cup. The Flyers folded after the 1999–2000 USHL Season.

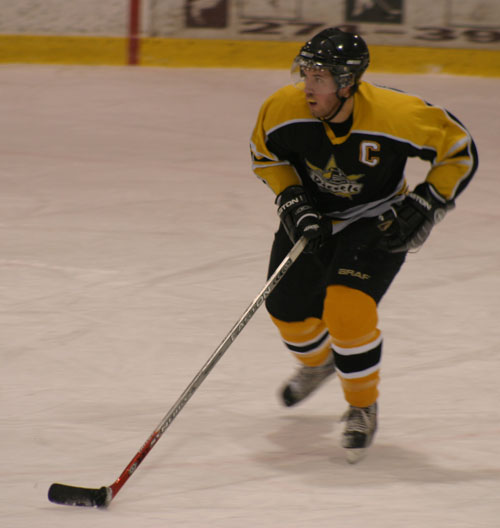
Diesels captain Reilly Miller (2007)

The Northwestern Ontario region has also been represented in the past in the Manitoba Junior Hockey League. From 1968 until 1982, the city of Kenora, Ontario, was represented by the Kenora Muskies/Thistles and in the mid-1980s, Thunder Bay had an entry with the Thunder Bay Hornets.

The folding of the Thunder Bay Flyers led to the rebirth of junior A hockey in the Thunder Bay region. The league started under the "Superior International" label in 2001 with five teams, including the Dryden Ice Dogs, First Nation Featherman Hawks, Fort Frances Borderland Thunder, Thunder Bay Bulldogs, and the Thunder Bay Wolves.

=== 2006 Dudley Hewitt Cup ===
In 2006, the Fort William North Stars won the Dudley Hewitt Cup with a 7–6 overtime win over the Northern Ontario Junior Hockey League's Sudbury Jr. Wolves to earn the team and the league its first regional title and its first shot at the national title in the 2006 Royal Bank Cup. The North Stars were eliminated in the Royal Bank Cup semifinal in Brampton, Ontario, with a 3–2 overtime loss to the British Columbia Hockey League's Burnaby Express led by eventual NHL player Kyle Turris.

=== Expansion and retraction ===
The presence of the SIJHL in Northwestern Ontario marks the first time since the 1970s that the region has effectively supported a junior hockey league. In 2007, the SIJHL expanded east of Thunder Bay with the Schreiber Diesels and Marathon Renegades. A Wawa, Ontario, franchise was also in the works, but never came to fruition.

2011 Action - Fort Frances vs. Sioux Lookout

On December 17, 2007, the Schreiber Diesels folded mid-season claiming lack of fan support. On December 21, the team was bought by a group of local fans in an effort to keep the Diesels alive. The Marathon Renegades at one point were as high as third place in the SIJHL during the 2007–08 season, but after 37 games played were forced to cancel the rest of its season citing a lack of players through injuries and player defections to other leagues. Al Cresswell, team president, claimed that the shortage of players had become a health risk.

Although the 2008–09 season did not see a return to Marathon, the SIJHL did add the Sioux Lookout Flyers. In the 2008 off-season, the Thunder Bay Bulldogs elected to retract to embolden the Thunder Bay Bearcats. Despite a strong year from the Bearcats and the Schreiber Diesels, both teams elected to cease operation in the summer of 2009. The Fort Frances Jr. Sabres claimed that they would be back for 2009–10, but their owners sold the rights to their players to teams across Canada. In a last-ditch effort, the town of Fort Frances bought the team and renamed them the Fort Frances Lakers, but were forced to find all new players due to the actions of the previous ownership. The Thunder Bay Wolverines elected to apply for promotion to the SIJHL for 2009–10 fresh off of their silver medal performance at the Keystone Cup Canadian Jr. B Championships. Back up to five teams, the SIJHL also made a 20-game interleague setup with the Minnesota Junior Hockey League's Wisconsin Mustangs to diversify the league's competition.

=== Tenth season and American expansion ===
The 2010–11 season was the tenth season of the SIJHL. The SIJHL received applications for expansion by two American teams: the Duluth Clydesdales and Wisconsin Mustangs.

In June, the Thunder Bay Wolverines pulled out of the SIJHL. A few days later USA Hockey rejected the transfer bid by the Wisconsin Mustangs to join the SIJHL and the expansion bid of the potential of Duluth, Minnesota, despite approval by Hockey Canada and the SIJHL. The league sat at four teams. The two teams appealed the decision and won, officially giving the league six teams and making the league an international league.

The Fort William North Stars were dominant early in 2010–11, but due to financial difficulties, the team was sold to new ownership and became the Thunder Bay North Stars. The Wisconsin Wilderness jumped into the lead mid-season and won the regular season and playoff titles in their first season in the league.

In the summer of 2011, the SIJHL elected to expand with the Iron Range Ironheads awaiting the permission of USA Hockey and Minnesota Hockey. USA Hockey again denied the league. The decision was appealed and on July 12, 2011, expansion was allowed by USA Hockey as well as the continuation of the Duluth and Spooner franchises. Wisconsin won their second straight league title, coming from behind in the final to beat the Fort Frances Lakers in seven games.

The 2012–13 season was a season of decline for the league's American expansion. During the off-season, USA Hockey allowed the league to transfer Iron Range to new ownership and rename it the Minnesota Iron Rangers. Wisconsin was sold and relocated into the same market as Duluth and renamed the Minnesota Wilderness. Three games into the season, the Sioux Lookout Flyers ceased operations and eventually their franchise when a scandal over the carding of players by their new general manager and coach left them without enough players to continue. In early 2013, the league, after multiple cancelled games, stripped the Duluth Clydesdales of their franchise. Then, after clinching their third regular season and playoff crowns, the Wilderness won the league's second ever Dudley Hewitt Cup as Central Canadian champions. Minnesota Wilderness became the first American team to win the Dudley Hewitt Cup and the first to gain berth into the Royal Bank Cup Canadian Junior A Championship. After winning the Central Canadian Championship, it was announced that the Wilderness would leave the SIJHL at the end of the Royal Bank Cup to join the North American Hockey League, a USA Hockey-sanctioned Tier II league. The Wilderness finished fourth in the National Championship round-robin, earning a berth into the semi-final. Despite leading 4–2 in the third, the Wilderness took too many penalties and lost their lead with seconds to go in the third period. The Alberta Junior Hockey League's Brooks Bandits scored in overtime to win the game 5–4 eliminating the Wilderness. With the Wilderness and Clydesdales gone, the Minnesota Iron Rangers were the remaining American team with membership in the league.

In the spring of 2013, the SIJHL announced expansion to Ear Falls, Ontario, with the English River Miners and on July 11, 2013, admitted a new team in Spooner, Wisconsin, also called the Wisconsin Wilderness. The new Wilderness lasted one season.

In the summer of 2014, commissioner and president Ron Whitehead was relieved of his post. Whitehead held his position from 2005 until 2014 and had been a member of the league executive since its inception in 2001. In 2011, Hockey Northwestern Ontario named Whitehead their Central Zone volunteer of the year.

The league added a second team in Minnesota and their sixth franchise for 2016–17 season with the Thief River Falls Norskies. In 2019, the league added another team in Spooner, Wisconsin, called the Wisconsin Lumberjacks for the 2019–20 season. After several seasons of ownership issues and lack of player recruitment, the Minnesota Iron Rangers ceased operations for the 2019–20 season, returning the league to six teams. The 2019–20 season was then curtailed by the COVID-19 pandemic with one week left in the regular season and no postseason tournaments were held. The ongoing pandemic border-crossing restrictions caused the two American teams to withdraw from the 2020–21 season while the league added a new team called the Kam River Fighting Walleye. The five Canadian teams would play a few games in November and December 2020 along with two U18 minor teams, the Kenora Thistles and Thunder Bay Kings, to fill in the schedule before the season was cancelled entirely.

In 2024, the Wisconsin Lumberjacks relocated from Spooner, Wisconsin, to Ironwood, Michigan, and were renamed the Ironwood Lumberjacks.

== Teams ==
Map of SIJHL teams

The league comprised seven franchises as of the 2025–26 SIJHL season. The Kenora Islanders, which debuted as an expansion franchise in 2023, suspended operations midseason in January 2025 and announced they were seeking a new owner to take over the franchise, citing a conflict with the board of governors.

Team	Centre	Arena	Joined
Dryden Ice Dogs	Dryden, Ontario	Dryden Memorial Arena	2001
Fort Frances Lakers	Fort Frances, Ontario	Memorial Sports Center	2009
Ironwood Lumberjacks	Ironwood, Michigan	Pat O'Donnell Civic Center	2019
Kam River Fighting Walleye	Oliver Paipoonge, Ontario	NorWest Arena	2020
Red Lake Miners	Red Lake, Ontario	Cochenour Arena	2013
Sioux Lookout Bombers	Sioux Lookout, Ontario	Sioux Lookout Memorial Arena	2022
Thunder Bay North Stars	Thunder Bay, Ontario	Fort William Gardens	2001

=== Former teams ===
- Fort Frances Borderland Thunder (2001–2005)
- Thunder Bay Bulldogs (2001–2008)
- Thunder Bay Bearcats (2001–2009)
- Schreiber Diesels (2005–2009)
- Marathon Renegades (2006–2008)
- Fort Frances Jr. Sabres (2007–2009)
- Sioux Lookout Flyers (2008–2012)
- Thunder Bay Wolverines (2009–2010)
- Duluth Clydesdales (2010–2013)
- Minnesota Wilderness (2010–2013)
- Minnesota Iron Rangers (2011–2019)
- Wisconsin Wilderness (2013–2014)
- Thief River Falls Norskies (2016–2022)
- Kenora Islanders (2023–2025)

=== Former interleague teams ===
- Iron Range Yellow Jackets (2001–02)
- Minot State University-Bottineau Lumberjacks (2005–06)
- Northwest Wisconsin Knights (2001–03)

== Bill Salonen Cup champions ==
Bill Salonen Cup

The winners of the SIJHL Playoffs are awarded the Bill Salonen Cup. Although the Jack Adams Trophy is supposed to be awarded to the branch Junior A champion, Hockey Northwestern Ontario will not bring it out unless there are two leagues vying for the branch championship.

Year	Champion	Finalist
2002	Dryden Ice Dogs	Fort Frances Borderland Thunder
2003	Fort Frances Borderland Thunder	Thunder Bay Bulldogs
2004	Fort William North Stars	Dryden Ice Dogs
2005	Fort William North Stars	Fort Frances Borderland Thunder
2006	Fort William North Stars	Dryden Ice Dogs
2007	Schreiber Diesels	Fort William North Stars
2008	Dryden Ice Dogs	Fort William North Stars
2009	Fort William North Stars	Thunder Bay Bearcats
2010	Fort William North Stars	Dryden Ice Dogs
2011	Wisconsin Wilderness	Dryden Ice Dogs
2012	Wisconsin Wilderness	Fort Frances Lakers
2013	Minnesota Wilderness	Fort Frances Lakers
2014	Fort Frances Lakers	Minnesota Iron Rangers
2015	Fort Frances Lakers	Dryden Ice Dogs
2016	Fort Frances Lakers	Dryden Ice Dogs
2017	Dryden Ice Dogs	English River Miners
2018	Dryden Ice Dogs	Thunder Bay North Stars
2019	Thunder Bay North Stars	Red Lake Miners
2020	Cancelled
2021	Cancelled
2022	Red Lake Miners	Kam River Fighting Walleye
2023	Kam River Fighting Walleye	Thunder Bay North Stars
2024	Sioux Lookout Bombers	Kam River Fighting Walleye
2025	Kam River Fighting Walleye	Dryden Ice Dogs
2026	Thunder Bay North Stars	Fort Frances Lakers

=== Dudley Hewitt Cup ===
Dudley Hewitt Cup - Regional Championship, competed for by SIJHL champions since 2001. Won in 2006 and 2013.

Year	Champion	Finalist	Host
2006	Fort William North Stars	Sudbury Jr. Wolves (NOJHL)	Thunder Bay, Ontario
2013	Minnesota Wilderness	St. Michael's Buzzers (OJHL)	North Bay, Ontario

== Single-season team records ==
- Best Winning Record:
  2005-06 Fort William North Stars - 50-2-0-0
- Most Goals For:
  2018-19 Thunder Bay North Stars - 363
- Fewest Goals Against:
  2004-05 Fort William North Stars - 66
- Worst Winning Record:
  2008-09 Sioux Lookout Flyers - 2-46-0-2
- Fewest Goals For:
  2004-05 Thunder Bay Bulldogs - 72
- Most Goals Against:
  2018-19 Minnesota Iron Rangers - 478

== Timeline of teams in the SIJHL ==
2001–02

- SIJHL is founded with five teams: Dryden Ice Dogs, Featherman Hawks, Fort Frances Borderland Thunder, Thunder Bay Bulldogs and Thunder Bay Wolves; as well as two interleague teams: Iron Range Yellow Jackets and Northwest Wisconsin Knights

2002–03

- Thunder Bay Wolves become Fort William Wolves
- Featherman Hawks become Nipigon Golden Hawks
- Iron Range Yellow Jackets break off interlock

2003–04

- Nipigon Golden Hawks move to Thunder Bay and become K&A Golden Hawks
- Fort William Wolves become Fort William North Stars
- Northwest Wisconsin Knights break off interlock

2005–06

- Schreiber Diesels join league
- Fort Frances Borderland Thunder leaves league
- MSU-Bottineau Lumberjacks enter into interlocking schedules

2006–07

- Marathon Renegades join league
- Thunder Bay Golden Hawks become Thunder Bay Bearcats
- MSU-Bottineau Lumberjacks break off interlock
- Fort Frances Jr. Sabres join league

2007–08

- Marathon Renegades withdraw from league mid-season (January)

2008–09

- Sioux Lookout Flyers join league
- Thunder Bay Bulldogs merge into Thunder Bay Bearcats

2009–10

- Schreiber Diesels leave league
- Thunder Bay Bearcats leave league
- Fort Frances Jr. Sabres are renamed Fort Frances Lakers
- Thunder Bay Wolverines join league from Thunder Bay Junior B Hockey League
- Wisconsin Mustangs enter into interlocking schedule

2010–11

- Thunder Bay Wolverines leave league
- Wisconsin Wilderness (formerly Mustangs) join league from Minnesota Junior Hockey League
- Duluth Clydesdales join league

2011–12

- Iron Range Ironheads join league

2012–13

- Iron Range Ironheads change name to Minnesota Iron Rangers
- Wisconsin Wilderness relocate and become Minnesota Wilderness
- Sioux Lookout Flyers cease operations
- League revokes Duluth Clydesdales franchise

2013–14

- Minnesota Wilderness leave league for North American Hockey League
- English River Miners join league
- New Wisconsin Wilderness join league

2014–15

- Wisconsin Wilderness folded

2016–17

- Thief River Falls Norskies joins league

2018–19

- English River Miners rebranded to Red Lake Miners

2019–20

- Wisconsin Lumberjacks joins league
- Minnesota Iron Rangers suspended

2020–21

- Kam River Fighting Walleye join as an expansion team

2022-23

- Sioux Lookout Bombers join league

2023–24

- Kenora Islanders join as an expansion team

2024–25

- Wisconsin Lumberjacks relocated to Ironwood, Michigan, and were renamed the Ironwood Lumberjacks
- Kenora Islanders suspended indefinitely
