= Boyle (surname) =

Boyle is an Irish, Scottish and English surname of Gaelic or Norman origin. In the northwest of Ireland it is one of the most common family names. Notable people with the surname include:

== Disambiguation ==
- Adam Boyle (disambiguation), multiple people
- Charles Boyle (disambiguation), multiple people
- David Boyle (disambiguation), multiple people
- Edward Boyle (disambiguation), several people
- Henry Boyle (disambiguation), multiple people
- James Boyle (disambiguation) (also Jimmy Boyle), multiple people
- John Boyle (disambiguation), multiple people
- Kevin Boyle (disambiguation), several people
- Mark Boyle (disambiguation), multiple people
- Mary Boyle (disambiguation), several people
- Peter Boyle (disambiguation), multiple people
- Richard Boyle (disambiguation), multiple people
- Robert Boyle (disambiguation), multiple people
- Stephen Boyle (disambiguation), multiple people
- Tommy Boyle (disambiguation), several people

== Arts and media ==
- Anthony Boyle (born 1994), Irish actor
- Alicia Boyle (1908–1997), Irish artist
- Bob Boyle, American animator
- Charles P. Boyle (1892–1968), American cinematographer
- Chris Cornell (1964–2017), musician, born Christopher Boyle
- Danny Boyle (born 1956), British film director, cousin of John Wayne
- Derek Paul Jack Boyle (born 1985), American visual artist
- Edward G. Boyle, (1899–1977), Canadian set decorator
- Frankie Boyle (born 1972), Scottish comedian
- George Frederick Boyle (1886–1948), Australian-American composer
- Ina Boyle (1889–1967), Irish composer
- James Boyle (broadcasting), BBC broadcaster
- Jimmy Boyle (artist) (born 1944), Scottish sculptor and novelist, former gangster
- Johnny Boyle, drummer for the Irish band, The Frames
- Katie Boyle (1926–2018), television presenter
- Lara Flynn Boyle (born 1970), U.S. actress
- Louise Boyle (1910–2005), U.S. photographer
- Mark Boyle (1934–2005), Scottish artist
- Peter Boyle (1935–2006), U.S. actor
- Ray Boyle (1923–2022), American actor
- Robert F. Boyle (1909–2010), director and production designer
- Ruth-Ann Boyle (born 1970), singer of the British group Olive
- Shary Boyle (born 1972), Canadian artist
- Susan Boyle (born 1961), Scottish singer and a contestant on the 3rd series of Britain's Got Talent
- Troy Boyle (born 1966), U.S. comic book artist and writer
- Zoe Boyle (born 1989), English actress

== Military ==
- Courtenay Boyle (1770–1844), British naval officer and MP
- Dermot Boyle (1904–1993), Marshal of the Royal Air Force
- Edward Courtney Boyle (1883–1967), English Royal Navy officer, First World War recipient of the Victoria Cross
- Jeremiah Boyle (1818–1871), Union Brigadier General during the American Civil War
- William H. Boyle (1836–1919), U.S. Army Colonel
- Thomas Boyle (1775–1825), U.S. Navy officer

== Politics, government, and law ==
- Andrew Boyle (politician) (died 1902), American politician
- Brendan Boyle (born 1977), politician
- Cavendish Boyle (1849–1916), British colonial administrator
- Charles Boyle, 2nd Viscount Blesington (died 1732), Irish politician
- Charles A. Boyle (1907–1959), U.S. Representative from Illinois
- Charles Edmund Boyle (1836–1888), U.S. Representative from Pennsylvania
- David Boyle, 7th Earl of Glasgow (1833–1915), governor of New Zealand 1892–1897
- David Boyle, Lord Boyle (1772–1853), Scottish judge and privy counsellor of the United Kingdom
- Sir Edward Boyle, 1st Baronet (1848–1909), MP for Taunton 1906–1909, grandfather of Baron Boyle
- Edward Boyle, Baron Boyle of Handsworth (1923–1981), British Conservative Party politician, MP 1950–1970
- Edward C. Boyle, (died 1981), Allegheny County District Attorney for Pittsburgh from 1956 to 1964
- Edward James Boyle Sr. (1913–2002), U.S. federal judge
- Emmet D. Boyle (1879–1926), former Governor of Nevada
- Francis Boyle (1950–2025), American human rights lawyer and professor of international law
- George Boyle, 6th Earl of Glasgow (1825–1890), Scottish politician
- Harris Boyle (c. 1953–1975), Northern Irish loyalist and Ulster Volunteer Force member
- Hugh Boyle Ewing (1826–1905), American diplomat, author and lawyer
- James Boyle (academic) (born 1959), professor of law
- James Boyle (Irish Parliamentary Party politician) (1863–1936), Irish politician, Member of Parliament for West Donegal 1900–1902
- James Boyle (Fianna Fáil politician) (fl.1930s), Fianna Fáil Member of the 1934–1936 Seanad Éireann
- James Boyle Uniacke (1799–1858), Canadian politician
- Jane J. Boyle (born 1954), District judge for the United States District Court for the Northern District of Texas
- John Boyle (congressman) (1774–1835), member of the U.S. House of Representatives
- John Charters Boyle (1869–1950), Unionist politician from Northern Ireland
- John Robert Boyle (1870–1936), Albertan politician
- Joshua Boyle (politician), Member of Parliament in the Irish House of Commons
- Kenneth Boyle (1937–2000), American politician and lawyer
- Kevin Boyle (lawyer) (1943–2010), Northern Ireland-born human rights activist, barrister and educator
- Kevin J. Boyle (born 1980), member of the Pennsylvania House of Representatives
- Larry Monroe Boyle (1943–2017), Associate Justice of the Idaho Supreme Court
- Louis C. Boyle (1866–1925), American lawyer and politician
- Mike Boyle (1944–2021), mayor of Omaha, Nebraska
- Murrough Boyle, 1st Viscount Blesington (c.1645–1718), governor of Limerick
- Patricia Boyle (1937–2014), American judge
- Patrick Boyle (publisher) (1832–1901), Irish-Canadian printer and publisher
- Sarah Patton Boyle (1906–1994), Virginian civil rights activist
- Terrence Boyle (born 1945), U.S. judge
- W. A. Boyle (1904–1985), president of the United Mine Workers of America union, 1963–1972
- William M. Boyle (1903–1961), American Democratic political activist from Kansas

== Religion ==
- Greg Boyle (born 1954), Jesuit priest in East Los Angeles
- Hugh Charles Boyle (1873–1950), American Roman Catholic bishop
- John Boyle (bishop) (1563–1620), Bishop
- Richard Boyle (archbishop of Tuam) (c. 1574–1644), Archbishop of Tuam

== Academia ==
- Brian J. Boyle, astrophysicist
- David Boyle (archaeologist) (1842–1911), Canadian educator and archaeologist
- Deborah Boyle, American philosopher
- Elette Boyle, American and Israeli computer scientist and cryptographer
- Helen Boyle (1869–1957), Irish-British physician and psychologist
- Henry Edmund Gaskin Boyle (1875–1941), anesthesiologist
- Phelim Boyle (born 1941), quantitative finance academic
- Robert Boyle (1627–1691), Anglo-Irish natural philosopher
- Robert William Boyle (1883–1955), Canadian physicist, co-inventor of sonar
- Willard Boyle (1924–2011), Canadian physicist

== Sports ==
- Brian Boyle (born 1984), professional hockey player
- Buzz Boyle (1908–1978), Major League Baseball player
- Connor Boyle, Scottish rugby union player
- Dan Boyle (ice hockey) (born 1976), professional ice hockey player
- Daryl Boyle (born 1987), Canadian professional ice hockey player
- David Boyle (rugby league, born 1959), Australian rugby league footballer
- Dylan Boyle, Northern Irish footballer
- Eddie Boyle (1874–1941), Major League Baseball player
- Hugh Boyle (golfer) (1936–2015), Irish golfer
- Jack Boyle (1866–1913), Major League Baseball player
- Jim Boyle (American football) (born 1962), American football player
- Jimmy Boyle (baseball) (1904–1958), American baseball player
- Jimmy Boyle (footballer) (born 1972), former Scottish footballer
- Joanne Boyle (born 1963), American basketball coach
- Joe Boyle (born 1999), American baseball player
- John Boyle (footballer, born 1946), Scottish footballer
- John Boyle (footballer, born 1986), Scottish footballer
- Lauren Boyle (born 1987), New Zealand swimmer
- Martin Boyle (born 1993), Australian soccer player born in Scotland
- Millie Boyle (born 1998), Australian rugby union player
- Morrie Boyle, Australian rugby league footballer
- Patrick Boyle (footballer) (born 1987), Scottish footballer
- Rachael Boyle (born 1991), Scottish footballer
- Raelene Boyle (born 1951), Australian athlete
- Richard Boyle (canoeist) (born 1961), New Zealand sprint canoeist
- Richard Boyle (rowing) (1888–1953), British rowing coxswain and medallist at the 1908 Summer Olympics
- Ryan Boyle (born 1981), U.S. lacrosse player
- Ryan Boyle (rugby league) (born 1987), rugby league player
- Stephen Boyle (born 1953), Australian footballer
- Steve Boyle (boxer) (born 1962), Scottish boxer
- Steve Boyle (rugby union) (born 1953), English rugby union player
- Terry Boyle (born 1958), Former footballer from Wales
- Tim Boyle (American football) (born 1994), American football player
- Tommy Boyle (footballer, born 1886) (1886–1940), football player who played for Barnsley, Burnley, and Wrexham
- Tommy Boyle (footballer, born 1901) (1901–1972), football player who played for Sheffield United, Manchester United, and Northampton Town
- Tony Boyle (born 1957), New Zealand cricketer
- Wesley Boyle (born 1979), Football midfielder

== Writers ==
- Andrew Boyle (journalist) (1919–1991), journalist and biographer
- Charles Boyle (poet) (born 1951), UK poet
- David Boyle (author) (1958–2025), economics author and journalist
- John Boyle O'Reilly (1844–1890), Irish poet and novelist
- Kay Boyle (1902–1992), U.S. writer and political activist
- Kevin Boyle (historian) (born 1960), author and professor of history at Ohio State University
- Nicholas Boyle (born 1946), British literature historian
- Patrick Boyle (writer) (1905–1982), Irish writer
- T. Coraghessan Boyle (born 1948), U.S. novelist and short story writer
- Virginia Frazer Boyle (1863–1938), U.S. poet and writer

== Other ==
- Gert Boyle (1924–2019), German-born American businesswoman
- Jarrod Boyle, American winemaker
- Joseph W. Boyle (1867–1923), Canadian adventurer
- Lisa Boyle (born 1964), American model
- Mark Boyle (snooker player) (born 1981), Scottish snooker player
- Paul Boyle (born 1964), British geographer and academic administrator
- Sarah Boyle (1609–1633), wife of Richard Boyle, 1st Earl of Cork
- Timothy Boyle (born 1949), American businessman

== Members of Boyle family headed by the Earl of Cork ==
- Richard Boyle, 1st Earl of Cork (1566–1643), Lord Treasurer of Ireland
- Richard Boyle, 1st Earl of Burlington (1612–1698), Lord High Treasurer of Ireland
- Roger Boyle, 1st Earl of Orrery (1621–1679), Irish soldier, statesman and dramatist
- Francis Boyle, 1st Viscount Shannon (1623–1699), Privy Councillor and governor of County Cork
- Charles Boyle, 3rd Viscount Dungarvan (1639–1694), Irish politician
- Charles Boyle, 2nd Earl of Burlington (died 1704), Anglo-Irish politician
- Henry Boyle, 1st Baron Carleton (1669–1725), Lord Treasurer of Ireland
- Charles Boyle, 4th Earl of Orrery (1674–1731), author, soldier and statesman
- Richard Boyle, 2nd Viscount Shannon (1675–1740), field marshal
- Henry Boyle, 1st Earl of Shannon (1682–1764), Irish politician
- Richard Boyle, 3rd Earl of Burlington (1694–1753), architect
- John Boyle, 5th Earl of Cork (1707–1762), writer and friend of Jonathan Swift
- Richard Boyle, 2nd Earl of Shannon (1727–1807), 2nd Earl of Shannon, Irish politician
- Hamilton Boyle, 6th Earl of Cork (1729–1764), British and Irish politician
- Edmund Boyle, 7th Earl of Cork (1742–1798), Irish peer
- Mary Boyle, Countess of Cork and Orrery (1746–1840), 18th-century British literary hostess
- Edmund Boyle, 8th Earl of Cork (1767–1856), Irish soldier and peer
- Henry Boyle, 3rd Earl of Shannon (1771–1842), Irish politician
- Richard Boyle, 4th Earl of Shannon (1809–1868), 4th Earl of Shannon, British politician
- Richard Boyle, 9th Earl of Cork (1829–1904), British politician
- William George Boyle (1830–1908), British soldier and politician
- Henry Boyle, 5th Earl of Shannon (1833–1890), British politician
- Charles Boyle, 10th Earl of Cork (1861–1925), Irish soldier and peer
- William Boyle, 12th Earl of Cork (1873–1967), Admiral of the Fleet
- John Boyle, 14th Earl of Cork (1916–2003), Irish peer

== Members of Clan Boyle headed by the Earl of Glasgow ==
- David Boyle, 1st Earl of Glasgow (1666–1733), Scottish politician
- John Boyle, 2nd Earl of Glasgow (1688–1740), Scottish politician
- John Boyle, 3rd Earl of Glasgow (1714–1775), Scottish politician
- George Boyle, 4th Earl of Glasgow (1766–1843), British peer
- James Carr-Boyle, 5th Earl of Glasgow (1792–1869), British politician and naval commander
- Patrick Boyle, 10th Earl of Glasgow (born 1939), British politician and chief of Clan Boyle

== See also ==
- Boyle, County Roscommon, Irish town
- Clan Boyle
- O'Boyle
- Boyle (disambiguation)
- Governor Boyle (disambiguation)
- Justice Boyle (disambiguation)
