= Van Riemsdyk =

Van Riemsdyk is a Dutch surname. Notable people with the surname include:

- James van Riemsdyk (born 1989), American ice hockey player
- Trevor van Riemsdyk (born 1991), American ice hockey player
