= Richard Boyle =

Richard Boyle may refer to:

== Nobility ==
- Richard Boyle, 1st Earl of Cork (1566–1643), Lord High Treasurer of Ireland
- Richard Boyle, 1st Earl of Burlington (1612–1698), and 2nd Earl of Cork, Lord High Treasurer of Ireland and a cavalier
- Richard Boyle, 2nd Viscount Shannon (1675–1740), British military officer and statesman
- Richard Boyle, 3rd Earl of Burlington (1694–1753), and 4th Earl of Cork
- Richard Boyle, 2nd Earl of Shannon (1727–1807), Irish peer and Member of Parliament
- Richard Boyle, 4th Earl of Shannon (1809–1868), British politician
- Richard Boyle, 9th Earl of Cork (1829–1904), British politician
- Richard Boyle, 6th Earl of Shannon (1860–1906), politician in Canada's Northwest Territories

== Sports ==
- Richard Boyle (canoeist) (born 1961), New Zealand sprint canoeist
- Richard Boyle (rowing) (1888–1953), British rowing coxswain; medallist at the 1908 Summer Olympics
- Dickie Boyle (1869–?), Scottish professional footballer for Everton
- Dick Boyle (American football), American football player and coach

== Politics ==
- Richard Boyle (MP, died 1665), Irish MP for County Cork
- Richard Boyle (MP, died 1711), Irish MP for Old Leighlin

== Religion ==
- Richard Boyle (archbishop of Tuam) (c. 1574–1644), Archbishop of Tuam
- Richard Boyle (bishop of Ferns and Leighlin) (died 1682), Anglican bishop

== Other people ==
- Richard Boyle (astronomer) (born 1943), astronomer at the Vatican Observatory
- Richard Boyle (journalist) (1942–2016), American screenwriter and protagonist for the 1986 film Salvador
- Richard Boyle (soldier) (died 1649), Anglo-Irish Royalist officer
- Richard Boyle (whistleblower), an employee at the Australian Tax Office who exposed unethical practices in 2017
- Richard Vicars Boyle (1822–1908), Irish civil engineer

== See also ==
- Boyle (disambiguation)
