= James Boyle =

James or Jim Boyle may refer to:

== Politicians ==
- James Boyle (Fianna Fáil politician) (died 1944), Fianna Fáil member of the 1934–1936 Seanad Éireann
- James Boyle (Irish Parliamentary Party politician) (1863–1936), Irish politician, member of parliament for West Donegal 1900–1902
- James Boyle (Maine politician) (born 1958), state senator for the 6th District of Maine
- James Carr-Boyle, 5th Earl of Glasgow (1792–1869), British politician and naval commander
- James P. Boyle (1885–1939), American politician
- James J. Boyle (1891–1970), member of the California legislature
- James Boyle (MP for Hereford) (died 1594), member of parliament (MP) for Hereford

== Sports ==
- Jimmy Boyle (baseball) (1904–1958), American baseball player
- Jimmy Boyle (footballer) (born 1967), Scottish footballer
- James Boyle (footballer, born 1866) (1866–?), Scottish footballer
- Jim Boyle (American football) (born 1961), American football player
- Jim Boyle (bowls) (1935–2015), Scottish international lawn and indoor bowls player
- Jim Boyle (basketball) (1942–2005), American college basketball player and coach

== Others ==
- James Boyle (legal scholar) (born 1959), Scottish professor of law
- James Boyle (broadcasting) (born 1946), British arts broadcaster
- James Boyle (diplomat), American diplomat
- Jimmy Boyle (artist) (born 1944), Scottish sculptor and novelist, former gangster
- Breakage (musician) (born 1982), real name James Boyle, British producer and DJ
- James Boyle, sole survivor of the collision of the coalship Retriever and the SS Connemara
- James W. Boyle (1922–1971), Malaysian jazz musician
- Jimmy Boyle (music producer) (born 1967), American record producer, songwriter and musician
