= Patrick Boyle =

Patrick Boyle may refer to:

- Patrick Boyle (footballer) (born 1987), Scottish footballer
- Patrick Boyle (writer) (1905–1982), Irish novelist
- Patrick Boyle, 8th Earl of Glasgow (1874–1963), Scottish nobleman and far right political activist
- Patrick Boyle, 10th Earl of Glasgow (born 1939), British peer, politician and the current chief of Clan Boyle
- Patrick J. Boyle, Canadian judge
- Patrick Boyle (publisher) (1832–1901), printer and publisher in Toronto, Canada

== See also ==
- Patrick O'Boyle (disambiguation)
