= Stephen Boyle (disambiguation) =

Stephen Boyle (born 1953) is an Australian footballer.

Stephen Boyle may also refer to:

- Sir Stephen Gurney Boyle, 5th Baronet (born 1962) of the Boyle baronets
- Steve Boyle (rugby union) (born 1953), British rugby player
- Steve Boyle (boxer) (born 1962), British lightweight boxer

== See also ==
- Boyle (disambiguation)
