= Robert Boyle (disambiguation) =

Robert Boyle (1627–1691) was an Anglo-Irish natural philosopher, chemist, physicist, and inventor

Robert Boyle or Bob Boyle may also refer to:

- Robert Edward Boyle (1809–1854), British politician
- Robert Boyle, 11th Earl of Cork (1864–1934), British peer
- Robert William Boyle (1883–1955), Canadian physicist
- Bob Boyle (footballer) (1876–1927), Australian rules footballer
- Robert F. Boyle (1909–2010), American director of art and film
- Bob Boyle (animator) (born 1971), American animator
- Robert Boyle-Walsingham (1736–1780), Irish politician and sailor
- Robert H. Boyle (1928–2017), American author and environmental activist

== See also ==
- Boyle (surname)
