= Hard Boiled (disambiguation) =

Hard Boiled is a 1992 Hong Kong action film directed by John Woo.

Hard boiled or hardboiled or hard-boiled may also refer to:

== Films ==
- Hard Boiled (1919 film), an American silent comedy film directed by Victor Schertzinger
- Hard Boiled (1926 film), an American silent western film
- Hard Boiled Mahoney, a 1947 film starring the comedy team of The Bowery Boys
- The Last Blood (1991 film), a.k.a. Hard Boiled 2; a Hong Kong action film

== Other uses ==
- Hard-boiled eggs, a type of cooked egg
- Hardboiled, a style of fiction pioneered in the mid-1920s
- Hard Boiled (Bakufu Slump album)
- Hard Boiled (comics), a 1990–1992 three-issue comic book mini-series written by Frank Miller and drawn by Geof Darrow
- Stranglehold (videogame), a.k.a. Hard Boiled 2; videogame sequel to the 1992 HK action film

== See also ==
- Boil (disambiguation)
- Hard (disambiguation)
