= Christian Brothers Academy (New Jersey) =

Private school in New Jersey, United States

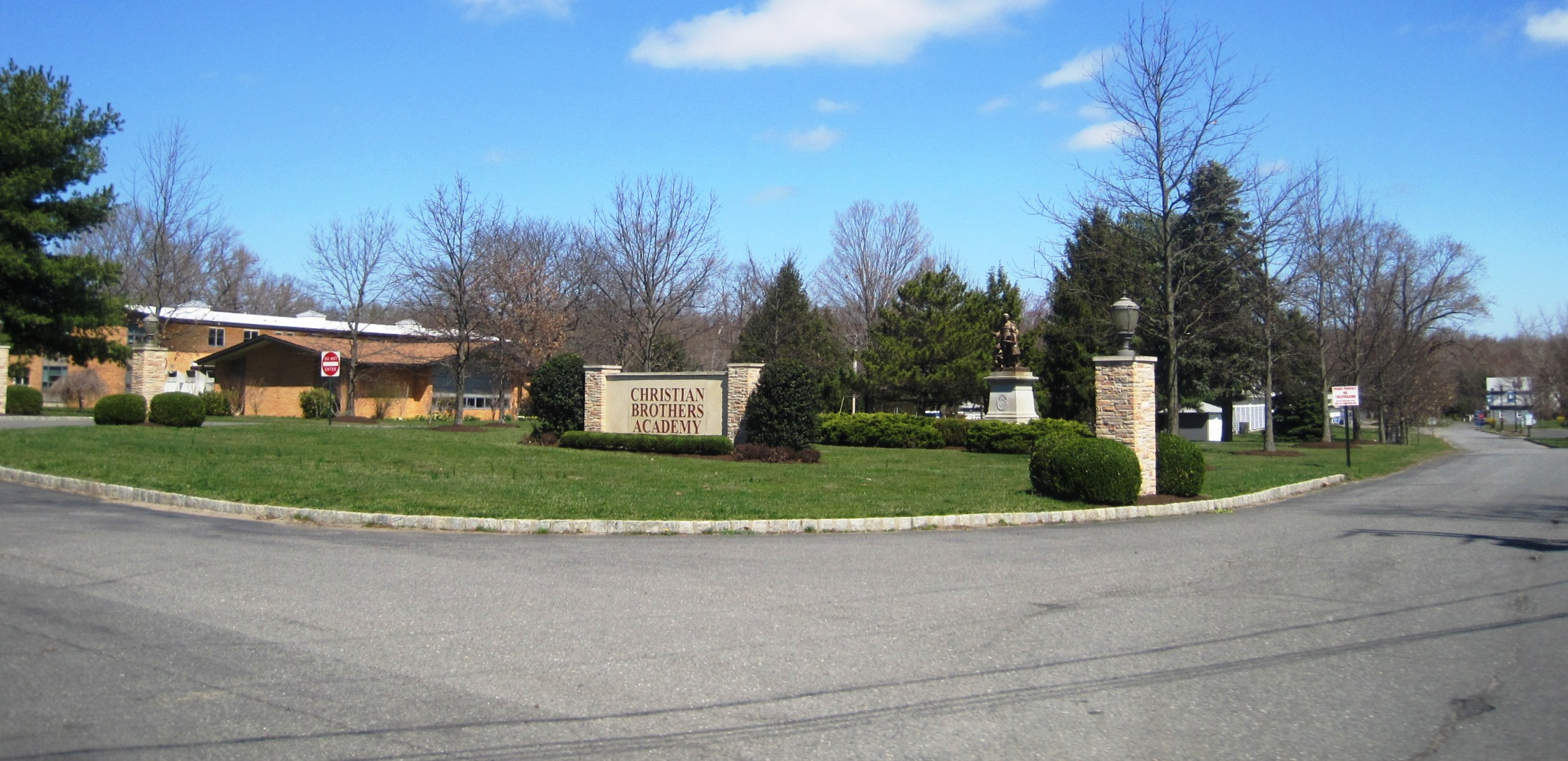
- Entrance to the school

Location
- 850 Newman Springs Road; Lincroft, Monmouth County, New Jersey 07738; United States; 40°20′12″N 74°8′19″W

Information
- Type: Private, Preparatory
- Motto: Religio Mores Cultura (Religion, Morals, Culture)
- Religious affiliations: Catholic, De La Salle Christian Brothers
- Established: 1959
- Founders: John C. Henderson; Peter E. Fleming; George A. Sheehan
- Oversight: Brothers of the Christian Schools, District of Eastern North America
- NCES School ID: 00866512
- President: R. Ross Fales
- Principal: Neil Begley
- Faculty: 64.3 FTEs
- Grades: 9–12
- Gender: Boys
- Enrollment: 876 (as of 2021–22)
- Student to teacher ratio: 13.6:1
- Campus: Suburban
- Campus size: 157 acres (0.64 km^{2})
- Colors: Blue and white
- Athletics conference: Shore Conference, Gordon Conference
- Team name: Colts
- Accreditation: Middle States Association of Colleges and Schools
- Newspaper: The Academy Torch
- Yearbook: Pegasus
- Tuition: $23,100 (2026–27)
- Literary magazine: The Arister
- Website: School website

Christian Brothers Academy (also known as CBA) is a private, all-boys preparatory Catholic high school in the Lincroft section of Middletown Township in New Jersey. The school is run by the Institute of the Brothers of the Christian Schools.

The school was originally a farm owned by the prominent Whitney family of New York City, and home to the Greentree Stable. The land was eventually given to the Christian Brothers for the purpose of teaching. The school opened in September 1959 and was blessed by the Bishop of Trenton on October 11, 1959. Christian Brothers Academy operates independently from the Diocese of Trenton and is governed by a board of trustees.

As of the 2021–22 school year, the school had an enrollment of 876 students and 64.3 classroom teachers (on an FTE basis), for a student–teacher ratio of 13.6:1. The school's student body was 79.5% (696) White, 10.6% (93) Hispanic, 6.8% (60) two or more races, 2.6% (23) Asian and 0.5% (4) Black.

The school has been accredited by the Middle States Association of Colleges and Schools Commission on Elementary and Secondary Schools since 1967.

== History ==
The site of Christian Brothers Academy was originally a farm owned by the prominent Whitney family of New York City, and home to their renowned Greentree Stable.

Christian Brothers Academy was founded in 1958, when a group of devoted laymen, including Doctor George A. Sheehan, realized the need for another Catholic high school in Monmouth County. With the approval of the bishop, they initiated a drive to raise funds for the purchase of a piece of property. The Brothers of the Christian Schools, under the leadership of their provincial, Brother Anthony John Halpin, agreed to staff the school and finance its construction.

The former Whitney Greentree Stables, a 157-acre (0.64 km^{2}) farm, was purchased and one building was converted into what is now Henderson Hall. With six Brothers on the teaching staff, the school opened for the first time in September 1959 with an inaugural ninth grade class of 140 students, with classrooms built in a converted horse stable. The school was blessed by the Bishop of Trenton on October 11, 1959,

A new brick school building with 13 additional classrooms and science labs, constructed at a cost of $1.8 million (equivalent to $19.2 million in 2025), opened in September 1962; that year, the school had 700 students in grades 9–12.

CBA Presidents

1. Brother Andrew O'Gara (1991–2008)
2. Brother Frank Byrne, FSC '75 (2009–2021)
3. Brother Thomas Gerrow, FSC (2021–2022)
4. R. Ross Fales (2022-), first layman to assume the office of president.

CBA Principals

1. Brother Bernard McKenna, FSC (1959–1965)
2. Brother Stephen McCabe, FSC (1965–1972)
3. Brother Peter Mannion, FSC (1972–1979)
4. Brother Andrew O'Gara, FSC (1979–1991), left the office of principal to become CBA's first president.
5. Brother Ralph Montedoro, FSC (1991–2005), previously Associate Principal.
6. Brother Stephen Olert, FSC (2005–2008)
7. Brother James Butler, FSC (2008–2012)
8. Peter Santanello (2012–2015), previously Associate Principal and first layman to assume the office of principal.
9. R. Ross Fales (2015–2022), previously Associate Principal.
10. Cornelius Begley (2022-)

Over the years, the school has undergone many additions and renovations, including the building of the Henderson Theater, three science labs, two large gyms, and extra classrooms. The school's Christian emphasis is noted by a sign in the lobby which reads: "Jesus is the reason for this school, the unseen but ever-present teacher in its classes, the model of the faculty and the inspiration of its students." Before school begins and at the start of every class, prayers are offered in the Lasallian manner, beginning "Let us remember we are in the Holy Presence of God" and ending with the invocations, "St. John Baptist de La Salle, pray for us." "Live Jesus in our Hearts. Forever!"

== Awards, recognition, and rankings ==
During the 1983–84 academic year, Christian Brothers Academy was recognized with the Blue Ribbon School Award of Excellence by the United States Department of Education, the highest award an American school can receive. The school was honored a second time when it was one of eight private schools recognized in 2017 by the Blue Ribbon Schools Program as an Exemplary High Performing School by the U.S. Department of Education.

== Academics ==
Advanced Placement courses offered include AP Art History, AP Biology, AP Calculus AB, AP Calculus BC, AP Chemistry, AP Macroeconomics, AP Microeconomics, AP English Language and Composition, AP English Literature and Composition, AP Environmental Science, AP European History, AP French Language, AP Human Geography, AP Latin: Vergil, AP Music Theory, AP Physics C, AP Physics 2, AP Psychology, AP Spanish Language, AP Statistics, AP United States History, and AP World History.

In addition to the 22 AP courses offered at Christian Brothers Academy, the institution offers nearly 90 other courses that spread throughout the disciplines.

In order to receive a diploma, a student must successfully complete four years of each of the following: English, Health, and Theology. He must also complete three years of the following courses: History, Foreign Languages, Mathematics, Science, and Physical Education. Furthermore, students are required to complete two years of Computer Science.

Students who excel in CBA and who meet particular standards of academics, service, leadership, and character may apply for entry to the National Honor Society.

== Extracurricular activities ==
Some activities at CBA include:

- Academic: Academic Team, Mathematics Team, Science Team, Engineering Club National Honor Society
- Art/Literature: Academy Torch (Newspaper), Arister (Literary Magazine), Pegasus (Yearbook) News Team, Journalism
- Performing Arts: Pipes and Drums, Chorus, Jazz Band, Pegasus Productions (Theater)
- Foreign Language: Spanish Club, Spanish National Honor Society, French Club, French National Honor Society, Italian Culture Society, Latin Honor Society, Classical Culture Society, Celtic Society
- Outdoor Activities: Frisbee Club, Landscaping-Engineering-Architecture and Design Club, Ski Club, Spikeball Club, Trail and Terrain Club
- Politics/Law: Student Council, Junior Statesmen of America, Mock Trial, Model U.N., Leadership Series, Social Justice Committee
- Religious: Theological Debate Society, Saint Brother Benilde Vocations Club, Gospel Sharing, Brother to Brother
- Other: Future Business Leaders of America, Students Against Destructive Decisions (SADD), Chess Club and Team, Sci-Fi Club, Comic Book and Anime Club, Action For Animals, Ping-Pong Club, Fishing Club, Wellness Club

The CBA chess team won the shore title in 2003, 2006 and again in 2007. In 2007, the team won the New Jersey state championship as it also did in 1980 and 1985. The team also placed 14th in 2007 at the U1500 at the National High School Chess Tournament in Kansas City, Missouri.

The school offers the Lasallian Youth program, a way for students to perform service to surrounding areas within the context of the spirituality of the school's patron, St. John Baptist de La Salle.

== Athletics ==
The Christian Brothers Academy Colts have competed since 1982 in Division A North of the Shore Conference, which is composed of public and private high schools in Monmouth and Ocean counties on the Northern Jersey Shore. The conference operates under the jurisdiction of the New Jersey State Interscholastic Athletic Association (NJSIAA). Since entering, the Colts have won over 240 Shore Conference championships. With 1,386 students in grades 10–12, the school was classified by the NJSIAA for the 2019–20 school year as Non-Public A for most athletic competition purposes, which included schools with an enrollment of 381 to 1,454 students in that grade range (equivalent to Group I for public schools).

CBA has been a member of the New Jersey State Interscholastic Athletic Association (NJSIAA) since the early 1960s. Since winning their first state title in 1965 (basketball), CBA has won over 145 state championships. At CBA, all sports are governed by the NJSIAA, with the exception of crew, rugby and sailing, which have independent governing bodies. Christian Brothers does not field an interscholastic football program.

Christian Brothers Academy has been recognized nine times by the NJSIAA as the Group A Non-Public winner of the annual ShopRite Cup, which is awarded for overall achievement by athletics programs in the state. The NJSIAA has recognized the school as Group A winner of the Shop Rite Cup Championships in 2004, 2005, 2006, 2011, 2012, 2013, 2015, 2016, 2017, 2018 and 2019–20.

=== Fall sports ===
Christian Brothers Academy offers cross country, soccer, rugby, sailing, and crew as sports in the fall season.

Crew

Head Coached by Scott Belford. Founded in 2004, the CBA crew team is a dual-season sport. The team won its first New Jersey State Scholastic Rowing Championships in the Novice 4+ event in its inaugural year. In the 2006 season, the team gained national recognition when its newly formed Lightweight 4+ placed 2nd at the Scholastic Rowing Nationals in Saratoga, New York. The Junior 4+ won the New Jersey State Scholastic Championships in 2008. The varsity double took 2nd place at the 2008 Stotesbury Cup, the largest high school regatta in the nation. In 2009, CBA won the senior 1x event at the New Jersey Scholastic Rowing Championships. In the 2011 spring season, the Lightweight 4+ placed second at the Stotesbury Cup and placed first in Nationals in Camden, New Jersey.

Cross country

The cross country team holds the national high school record for consecutive dual meet wins, having surpassed the 265 streak accomplished by Blackstone-Millville Regional High School in Massachusetts from 1974 to 1992. After losing a dual meet to Raritan High School, 15–50, to end the 1973 season, the streak dates back to September 19, 1974, with a 15–49 win over Marist High School to start the season. Blackstone-Millville's record of 265 wins was tied on September 28, 2004, with a win against Marlboro High School and the record broken two days later against Middletown High School North. The team is consistently ranked 1st in New Jersey and has been ranked 1st in the United States on multiple occasions.

Head coach Tom Heath '65, who is responsible for building the cross country team to its current dominant state, retired from coaching at the end of the 2015 season. He won 21 NJSIAA Meet of Champions crowns, 27 NJSIAA state championships and went 42 years without losing a dual-meet. In 2016, assistant coach Sean McCafferty was promoted to cross country head coach, in addition to his role as distance and assistant coach for indoor and outdoor track.

- State group championships: 1976, 1978–1980, 1982, 1986, 1987, 1991–1993, 1995–2005, 2010–2014, 2016–2019. The program's 30 state group titles are the most of any school in the state and the streak of 11 team titles won from 1995 to 2005 is the second-longest of any program in the state.
- State Meet of Champions team titles: 1979, 1980, 1986, 1987, 1990, 1991, 1993, 1995–2000, 2004, 2005, 2010-2015 and 2017–2019. The 24 team MoC titles are the most of any school in the state and the two six-year winning streaks (from 1995 to 2000 and 2010–2015) are the state's longest.
- National champions: 2011
- National records: 400 consecutive dual meet victories- 9/19/74- present* (as of end of 2024 season)

Rugby

Rugby formed as a club team in 2011 at CBA, being elevated to varsity status in 2013. The team is coached by Patrick Moroney. In their inaugural varsity spring season, the rugby 15's won the New Jersey High School state championship, finishing up an undefeated season. In the fall of 2015, the rugby 7's won their first state championship. CBA won the 2024 State Sevens Championship and followed up with New Jersey's first ever undefeated Sevens State Championship in 2025.

Sailing

Another dual-season sport at CBA, the sailing team has existed in some form since 2000, first as a club team beginning in 2000. The 2005 club team qualified for the Interscholastic Sailing Association (ISSA)'s Mallory National Championship. After a year of inactivity, the current iteration of CBA Sailing began in 2007 and was promoted to varsity status in 2011. Since then, the 16-member varsity squad has been an active member of the New Jersey Interscholastic Sailing Association (NJISA), a division of the Mid-Atlantic Scholastic Sailing Association (MASSA). In 2014, the sailing team won their first-ever NJISA League Championship, and in 2015, CBA was crowned New Jersey State Champions for the first time. The Colts made it back-to-back titles, winning the 2016 New Jersey state championship as well. In 2017, CBA qualified for the ISSA Mallory National Championship for the first time as a varsity team and second time in school history. The team's longtime coach is Jody Lutz, a Barnegat Bay Sailing Hall of Fame inductee and multiple-time North American sailing champion.

- League championships: 2014 (fall), 2015 (spring), 2015 (fall), 2016 (spring)
- State championships: 2015, 2016

Soccer

From 1978 to 2016, CBA was coached by Dan Keane, who had a record of 545–157–41 in his 39-year tenure with the Colts and built the program to state dominance, having won four group titles, 17 sectional championships and winning the Shore Conference Tournament on ten occasions. The 1992 team finished the season with a 17–1 record after winning the Non-Public A title against Don Bosco Preparatory High School by a score of 2–0 in the tournament final. In 1998, the team finished undefeated with a 20–0–2 record after a win against Delbarton School by a score of 5–0 in the Non-Public A championship game played at The College of New Jersey. The 2000 team finished the season 19–2–1 after a come-from-behind 3–2 win against Pingry School in the Non-Public A finals. The 2011 team was 21–0 and beat Delbarton by a score of 1–0 in the Non-Public A state title game on a goal in the second minute of overtime by future MLS player Scott Thomsen '12. Keane retired in 2016, winning the 2015 Shore Conference Tournament as his last act. JV and assistant coach Tom Mulligan '83 was promoted to head varsity coach in 2016, winning both the state title (with a 1–0 win against Seton Hall Preparatory School in the Non-Public A finals) and conference title (with a 2–0 win vs. Marlboro High School) to finish with a 24–1 record in his first season. Mulligan's Colts finished the 2018 season 21–1–1 after winning a second state title in three years, beating previously undefeated Delbarton by a score of 2–1 on a goal scored in double overtime in the 100th and final minute of the Non-Public A state championship. The Colts won another Non-Public A state championship in 2022, defeating Seton Hall Prep by a score of 1–0 in the finals.

- Conference championships: 1984, 1985, 1988, 1992, 1993, 1998, 2004, 2010, 2011, 2015, 2016, 2022
- Non-Public A state championship: 1992 (defeating Don Bosco in the tournament final), 1998 (vs. Delbarton), 2000 (vs. Pingry School), 2002 (vs. Don Bosco), 2011 (vs. Delbarton), 2016 (vs. Seton Hall), 2018 (vs. Delbarton). and 2022 (Seton Hall).

=== Winter sports ===
Christian Brothers Academy offers basketball, bowling, fencing, ice hockey, indoor track, swimming, and wrestling as sports in the winter season.

Basketball

CBA has reached the Final Four of the Shore Conference Tournament in all but five years since their inclusion in 1982. Vinnie Cox served as the head coach through the formative years, winning CBA's first ever state championship in any sport in 1965 with a 76–59 win against Don Bosco Preparatory High School in the Parochial A finals at the Atlantic City Convention Hall. Cox's Colts would win four more state titles before his retirement in 1980. Before a crowd of 1,000 spectators, the 1971 team held off Essex Catholic by a score of 70–68 in the championship game to win the Parochial A title and finish the season at 25–2. The 1984 team finished the season with a 29–1 record after winning the Parochial A state title by defeating St. Peter's 59–47 in the championship game. The Colts had a 10-year home win streak vs. division opponents during the mid-1990s to mid 2000s, when the streak was snapped by the Colts Neck Cougars in December 2006. The team earned a national ranking of #11 in the final 1999−2000 rankings by USA Today. The team has sent numerous players to Division I programs, including forward Dan Werner, who won New Jersey Player of the Year in 2006 and won a Division I national championship with Florida in 2007. In 2007, head coach Ed Wicelinski retired after 27 years with a 625–116 record and three state championships. Geoff Billet '95, who played on the last CBA state championship team and started at Rutgers, was named the head basketball coach on August 1, 2007. Billet won conference titles in 2009 and 2010.

In 2016, Pat Andree '16 broke the CBA all-time scoring record, which was held by Bob Roma '75 for 40 years. He finished with 1,984 points before playing Division I basketball for Lehigh University, and later NC State University.

Varsity basketball championships:

- Shore Conference championships: 1984, 1985, 1987–1990, 1993–1996, 2000, 2001, 2003, 2005, 2006, 2009, 2010. The 16 Shore Conference Tournament titles are the second most of any school.
- State championships: 1965 (vs. Don Bosco), 1971 (vs. Essex Catholic High School), 1972 (vs. St. Peter's Preparatory School), 1973 (vs. Hudson Catholic Regional High School), 1979 (vs. Bergen Catholic High School), 1984 (vs. St. Peter's), 1985 (vs. Bergen Catholic) and 1995 (vs. Bergen Catholic). The program's eight state title are tied for seventh-most in the state.

Bowling

Coached by Patrick Reynolds.

Fencing

The first year of Varsity Fencing at CBA was the 2012–13 winter season, coached by Mary Mottola. Fencers from CBA have gone on to fence at Brandeis, Stevens, Sacred Heart and University of Pennsylvania.

- District Championships- 2017

Indoor track

Coached by Karl Torchia, the track team has won more titles at the county, state, and national level than any other sports in the school combined.

- Conference championships: 1983, 1984, 1985, 1987, 1989, 1994, 1997, 1999, 2000, 2001, 2002, 2004, 2005, 2006, 2008, 2011, 2012, 2013, 2014, 2015, 2016, 2017, 2018, 2019, 2020
- State championships: Parochial A - 1978, 1980, 1981; Non-Public - 1982–1988; Group IV - 1989, 2001, 2005, 2006; Non-Public A - 2008, 2011–2020. The program's 25 state titles are the most of any school in the sport.
- State relay championships: Parochial A - 1978, 1981; Parochial - 1982–1988; Group IV - 1994, 1995, 1998, 2000, 2001, 2004–2006; Non-Public 2008–2012; Non-Public A - 2013, 2015–2020 and 2022. The program's 29 state titles is the most of any school in the state.

Ice hockey

The Christian Brothers Academy hockey team competes in both the Gordon Conference and the Shore Conference, and is coached by Ryan Bogan. Christian Brothers Academy's home games are played at the Jersey Shore Arena in Wall Township, New Jersey. From 1994 to 1996, the Colts hockey team won both the Gordon Cup and the state championship in three consecutive years.

On January 31, 2014, the Christian Brothers Academy team played outdoors in a Stadium Series game against Don Bosco Prep at Yankee Stadium; the two teams played to a 1–1 tie. In 2014, the Colts played Morristown-Beard School was declared the Non-Public state co-champion after the game ended in a 4–4 tie, which was only the second time that two teams have been declared co-champions. In 2015, the Colts battled back from a 3–0 deficit to Delbarton School in the Non-Public state final to win the game 4–3 in overtime. Dean DiFazio scored the goal in overtime to give CBA their second straight state title. The team won the title in 2020 with a 4–1 against Don Bosco Preparatory High School in the tournament final.

The CBA hockey program has produced four players -- James van Riemsdyk, Trevor van Riemsdyk, Connor Clifton and Joakim Ryan—who went on to play in the National Hockey League. The school officially retired Trevor's number 6 following his 2015 Stanley Cup victory.

Varsity hockey championships:

- Gordon Cup championships: 1991, 1994–1996, 2007, 2010, 2013, 2016 and 2020
- State championships: 1983, 1994–1996, 2005, 2014, 2015 and 2020. The program's eight state titles (in 12 finals appearances) are tied for third-most in the state.

Swimming

The CBA Swim Team has been the Monmouth County and Shore Conference champions for 28 years in a row coached by Michael Sullivan. Notable CBA swimmers are 2000 Summer Olympics bronze medalist Tom Wilkens, and professional baseball player Vito Chiaravalloti, who is varsity swim coach as of October 2008. The 2009−10 swim team went 12−0 and captured their second ever state championship topping St. Augustine Preparatory School 86−84. The team was the fastest in CBA school history and also the first team to finish top ranked in New Jersey. In 2011 the team took their 21st Shore Conference and Monmouth County Tournament victories and also became the first team in CBA history to win back-to- back state championships, defeating St. Joseph (Metuchen) 92–78. The 2012 team won another state title.

Varsity swimming championships:

- Conference Championships- 1991, 1992, 1993, 1994, 1995, 1996, 1997, 1998, 1999, 2000, 2001, 2002, 2003, 2004, 2005, 2006, 2007, 2008, 2009, 2010, 2011, 2012, 2013, 2014, 2015, 2016, 2017, 2018, 2019, 2020
- State: 1998, 2010, 2011, 2012, 2013, 2014, 2015, 2016, 2018, 2019, 2020
- seven consecutive group titles from 2010 to 2016 is the sixth-longest streak in state history and the 10 state championships are ninth-most of any school in the state.

Wrestling

In 2005–06, the team went 17−4 and made it to the division finals; the Colts finished ranked 15th in New Jersey and had one athlete place at the state level. The Colts had four district champions and advanced eight to the region 6 tournament. David Santamaria (class of 1998) placed 2nd in the New Jersey high school state wrestling tournament three years in a row; Kevin Mount (class of 1999) placed 4th in the New Jersey high school state wrestling tournament his senior year. Coach Michael Baldi recently retired after years of service. Head coach is Michael Tomaino who received his first career victory as the head coach in the opening match of the 2006–07 season. The team ended with a 14–10 record with three 20-match winners and James Beshada set a school record of 41 single season victories.

In the 2007−08 season, the Colt wrestlers finished second in District 22, beating state-ranked Raritan High School, and coming within one place of beating Ocean Township High School for the championship. CBA sent nine wrestlers to the Region tournament, and had 12 of 14 notch wins in districts. They finished their dual meet season with a record of 14−12, and beat traditional rival St. John Vianney High School 35−22 to send them to the Sectional Semi-finals of the Non-Public A South NJSIAA Tournament where they lost to Camden Catholic High School, 35−19. Their season was capped by a 5th in the State finish by Senior Captain Joe Favia. This is the third consecutive season the Colts placed a wrestler in the state tournament.

- Conference Championships- 2016
- District Championships- 1968, 2014, 2015, 2016

=== Spring sports ===
Christian Brothers Academy offers baseball, crew, golf, lacrosse, outdoor track, rugby, sailing, tennis, and volleyball in the spring.

Baseball

Under the direction of Head Coach Martin Kenney, the Colts have been a dominant force in New Jersey high school baseball since 1974. In 2007, Coach Kenney earned his 600th career win with a victory over Wall High School and eclipsed 700 wins in his 40th season (2014).

In 2015, CBA secured their greatest season in history, winning all five Championships that the team competed in: "A" North Division, Monmouth County, Shore Conference, NJSIAA Sectional and NJSIAA State. The 2015 Colts finished #1 in the county, Shore, State and Tri-State. They were also ranked in two National H.S. Baseball Polls, #23 in the U.S.A Today poll and #21 in the Max Preps H.S. Baseball poll.

- Conference Championships- 1993, 2000, 2001, 2002, 2014, 2015, 2016
- State Championships- 1977, 2009, 2015

Crew

Founded in 2004, the CBA crew team is a dual-season sport. The team won its first New Jersey State Scholastic Rowing Championships in the Novice 4+ event in its inaugural year. In the 2006 season, the team gained national recognition when its newly formed Lightweight 4+ placed 2nd at the Scholastic Rowing Nationals in Saratoga, New York. The Junior 4+ won the New Jersey State Scholastic Championships in 2008. The varsity double took 2nd place at the 2008 Stotesbury Cup, the largest high school regatta in the nation. In 2009, CBA won the senior 1x event at the New Jersey Scholastic Rowing Championships. In the 2011 Spring Season, the Lightweight 4+ placed second at the Stotesbury Cup and placed first in Nationals in Camden, New Jersey.

Golf

The CBA golf team won the state championship in 2005 under the direction of head coach Tim Sewing. They began a stretch of Shore Conference dominance in 2011, winning the next five of six conference tournaments including the 2016 title.

- Conference Championships- 1995, 1996, 1997, 2000, 2006, 2008, 2010, 2011, 2012, 2013, 2014, 2015, 2016, 2017, 2018
- State Championships- 1985, 1986, 1996, 1997, 1998, 2006, 2007, 2008, 2009, 2011, 2012, 2013, 2017

Lacrosse

Their longtime head coach is Dave Santos '85.

- Conference Championships- 2005, 2006, 2008, 2009

Rugby

Rugby formed as a club team in 2011 at CBA, being elevated to varsity status in 2013. The team is coached by Patrick Moroney, the head coach of the Monmouth Rugby Club. In their inaugural varsity spring season, the rugby 15's won the New Jersey High School state championship, finishing up an undefeated season. In the fall of 2015, the rugby 7's won their first state championship.

Sailing

Another dual season sport at CBA, the sailing team has existed in some form since 2000, first as a club team beginning in 2000. The 2005 club team qualified for the Interscholastic Sailing Association (ISSA)'s Mallory National Championship. After a year of inactivity, the current iteration of CBA Sailing began in 2007 and was promoted to varsity status in 2011. Since then, the 16-member varsity squad has been an active member of the New Jersey Interscholastic Sailing Association (NJISA), a division of the Mid-Atlantic Scholastic Sailing Association (MASSA). In 2014, the sailing team won their first-ever NJISA League Championship, and in 2015, CBA was crowned New Jersey State Champions for the first time. The Colts made it back-to-back titles, winning the 2016 New Jersey state championship as well. In 2017, CBA qualified for the ISSA Mallory National Championship for the first time as a varsity team and second time in school history. The team's longtime coach is Jody Lutz, a Barnegat Bay Sailing Hall of Fame inductee and multiple-time North American sailing champion.

- League Championships- 2014 (fall), 2015 (spring), 2015 (fall), 2016 (spring)
- State Championships- 2015, 2016

Tennis

The tennis team is one of the most accomplished sports at CBA. The Colts have won over 20 state championships, most recently in 2013. The period of success came under the direction of head coach Dan Keane, who retired after the 2016 season after serving as coach since 1978, having led the team to 14 state group titles and an overall record of 649–155.

- Conference championships: 1983, 1984, 1985, 1986, 1987, 1988, 1989, 1990, 1991, 1992
- State championships: 1970, 1973–1986, 1988–1995, 2013

Volleyball

Volleyball became a varsity sport at CBA in the 2000s and began seeing success late in the decade behind head coach Monica Slattery. In 2015, Christian Brothers won the Shore Conference Championship for the first time in team history. On April 10, 2019, the team won its 300th win in program history.

- Shore Conference championships: 2015

Track and Field

- Conference championships: 1983, 1988, 1994, 1999, 2000, 2001, 2005, 2011, 2012, 2013, 2014, 2015, 2016, 2017
- State championships: Non-Public A titles in 1978–1983, 1985, 1987, 1988, 1993–1995, 1999–2004, 2012, 2016-2019 and 2021. The program's 26 state titles are the most of any school in the state.

== Notable alumni ==
- Edward G. Amoroso, computer security professional, entrepreneur, author and educator
- Tim Begley (born 1983), former professional basketball player
- Derek Paul Jack Boyle (born 1985), visual artist who shows work in New England, graduate of RISD's Digital + Media program
- Kurt Braunohler (born 1976, class of 1994), comedian
- Twilly Cannon (1955–2016), environmental and social justice activist
- Brian Casey, President of Colgate University
- Connor Clifton (born 1995), ice hockey defenseman for the Boston Bruins of the NHL
- Josh Cohen (born 2001), college basketball player
- John Crotty (born 1969), former professional basketball player who played 11 NBA seasons from 1992 to 2003. He played for the Utah Jazz, Cleveland Cavaliers, Miami Heat, Portland Trail Blazers, Seattle SuperSonics, Detroit Pistons and Denver Nuggets. Crotty is currently the color commentary radio announcer for the Heat
- Jeff DeGrandis (born 1957), animation director.
- Pat Delany, basketball coach who has worked in various coaching positions in the NBA
- Edward A. Flynn (born 1948), law enforcement official who served as Chief of the Milwaukee Police Department
- Chris Gotterup (born 1999), PGA tour player
- Tom Judge (born 1999), soccer player who plays as a defender
- Brian Kennedy, head coach for the NJIT Highlanders men's basketball team
- Nick LaBrocca (born 1984), professional soccer player for Toronto FC of Major League Soccer. Attended and played at Rutgers University and was taken with the 35th overall pick of the 2007 MLS SuperDraft
- Pat Light (born 1991, class of 2009), professional baseball player who played for the Boston Red Sox and Minnesota Twins
- Brian Lynch (born 1978), Irish-American professional basketball player and former standout at Villanova University who currently plays for the Belgian team, Euphony Bree. Lynch is married to former World No. 1-ranked tennis star Kim Clijsters
- Jan Sport (born 1993), drag queen and singer who appeared on RuPaul's Drag Race Season 12
- John A. Mulheren (1947–2003) became a leading Wall Street financier in the 1980s and 1990s
- Lou Taylor Pucci (born 1985), actor who appeared in HBO's Empire Falls and other independent films
- Tony Reali (born 1978), current host of Around the Horn on ESPN and "stat boy" on Pardon the Interruption
- Patrick Reilly (born 2001; class of 2020), professional baseball player
- Kenneth P. Ruscio (born 1954; class of 1972), President of Washington and Lee University
- Joakim Ryan (born 1993), professional hockey player in the San Jose Sharks system
- Athanasios Scheidt (born 1998), soccer player who plays as a midfielder for Polish club Radomiak Radom
- Michael A. Sheehan (1955–2018, class of 1973), author, government official and military officer
- Scott Thomsen (born 1993), soccer player who plays as a defender for the Richmond Kickers in the United Soccer League
- Andrew Toole (born 1980; class of 1998), men's basketball head coach at Robert Morris University
- Jerry Tuite (1966–2003; class of 1986), professional wrestler who performed as "The Wall" in World Championship Wrestling and "Malice" for Total Nonstop Action Wrestling.
- James van Riemsdyk (born 1989), professional hockey player for the Philadelphia Flyers
- Trevor van Riemsdyk (born 1991, class of 2009), professional hockey player for the Washington Capitals, who won the 2015 Stanley Cup with the Chicago Blackhawks
- Dan Werner (born 1987, class of 2006), University of Florida basketball player who won the NCAA National Championship with the Gators in 2007
- Paul Wesley (born 1982), actor who has appeared in The Vampire Diaries
- Tom Wilkens (born 1975), Olympic bronze medal-winning swimmer
- Jimmy Yacabonis (born 1992), professional baseball pitcher who played in Major League Baseball for the Baltimore Orioles, Seattle Mariners, Miami Marlins, Tampa Bay Rays, and New York Mets
