= Athanasios Scheidt =

American soccer player

Personal information
- Full name: Athanasios Augustus Scheidt
- Date of birth: March 24, 1998 (age 28)
- Place of birth: New Jersey, United States
- Height: 1.87 m (6 ft 2 in)
- Position: Midfielder

Youth career
- –2016: Christian Brothers Academy
- 2017: Players Development Academy
- 2017: JFV Nordwest
- 2017–2019: San Martín (SJ)

College career
Years	Team	Apps	(Gls)
2016–2017	Rutgers Scarlet Knights	15	(0)

Senior career*
Years	Team	Apps	(Gls)
2019–2020	San Martín (SJ)	0	(0)
2020	Leixões	0	(0)
2020–2021	Radomiak Radom	3	(0)
2021–2022	Ayia Napa	24	(2)
- * Club domestic league appearances and goals as of March 24, 2024

Athanasios Augustus Scheidt (Greek: Αθανάσιος Αύγουστος Σέιντ; born March 24, 1998) is an American soccer player of Greek descent who plays as a midfielder.

== Early life ==
=== High school career ===
Scheidt attended Christian Brothers Academy (CBA) in Lincroft, New Jersey, where he was a standout midfielder. During his time at CBA, he contributed significantly to the program's success, helping the Colts maintain their reputation as one of the state's top high school soccer teams. In the 2013–2014 season, Scheidt was listed on the varsity roster as a sophomore, wearing jersey number 10.

Scheidt's performances at CBA garnered attention from collegiate programs, ultimately leading to his commitment to play for Rutgers University's men's soccer team. He was ranked as the No. 7 midfielder in the region and No. 20 nationally by IMG Academy, and was listed as the No. 62 overall recruit in the Class of 2016 by College Soccer News. Additionally, he participated in U.S. National Team Market Training and was selected for the US Club Soccer ID2 National Team.

=== College career ===
Scheidt enrolled at Rutgers University in 2016, joining the Scarlet Knights men's soccer team as a freshman midfielder. During the 2016 season, he appeared in 15 matches and started in 11 of them, contributing consistently in the midfield with his tactical awareness and passing vision.

One of his notable performances came on October 11, 2016, in a match against Princeton University, where he played a key role in building the play that led to Rutgers' lone goal in a 4–1 loss.

Following his freshman season, Scheidt pursued additional development opportunities abroad, including training with Hamburger SV in Germany and participating in the Real Madrid Adidas Summer Select Program. These experiences helped pave the way for his eventual transition into a professional career in Europe.

== Club career ==
=== Early career ===
Scheidt is a product of the youth team systems of various American and German sides. He was also part of the teams as San Martín (SJ), and Leixões, but mainly played for their reserve teams and failed to debut in the first teams.

=== Radomiak Radom ===
On October 9, 2020, Scheidt signed a one-year contract with I liga club Radomiak Radom. On November 6, 2020, he made his debut in a 0–1 away win against Stomil Olsztyn after being named in the starting line-up.

== Personal life ==
Scheidt was born in New Jersey, United States, to Greek parents. Scheidt's father, John as well as sister, Joan, were both soccer players.

Raised in Wall Township, New Jersey, Scheidt played prep soccer at Christian Brothers Academy.

== Honours ==
Radomiak Radom

- I liga: 2020–21
