= Kevin Boyle =

Kevin Boyle may refer to:

- Kevin Boyle (historian) (born 1960), American author and chair of the history department at Northwestern University
- Kevin Boyle (lawyer) (1943–2010), Northern Ireland-born human rights activist, barrister and educator
- Kevin J. Boyle (born 1980), member of the Pennsylvania House of Representatives
- Kevin Boyle (ice hockey) (born 1992), American ice hockey goaltender
- Kevin Boyle (basketball) (born 1960), former Iowa Hawkeyes basketball player

== See also ==
- Kevin Boyles (born 1967), former volleyball player for Canada
- Boyle (disambiguation)
