= Boyle River =

Boyle River may refer to:

- Boyle River (Ireland)
- Boyle River (New Zealand)

== See also ==
- Boyle (disambiguation)
