= Patrick O'Boyle =

Patrick O'Boyle may refer to:

- Patrick O'Boyle (cardinal) (1896–1987), Archbishop of Washington
- Patrick O'Boyle (Irish bishop) (1887–1971), Bishop of Killala

== See also ==
- Patrick Boyle (disambiguation)
