= Adam Boyle =

Adam Boyle may refer to:

- Adam Boyle (active 2011), British motorcyclist who competed in the 2011 National Superstock 600 Championship season
- Adam Boyle (active 2012–13), Scottish footballer playing for Cambuslang Rangers F.C.

== See also ==
- Adam Boyle, title character of the song "Adam Boyle Has Cast Lad Rock Aside" on the 2014 album Urge for Offal by the band Half Man Half Biscuit
- Boyle (surname) for other people with the same surname
