= David Boyle =

David Boyle may refer to:

- David Boyle, 1st Earl of Glasgow (1666–1733), Scottish nobleman
- David Boyle, 7th Earl of Glasgow (1833–1915), governor-general of New Zealand
- David Boyle, 9th Earl of Glasgow (1910–1984), British nobleman and sailor
- David Boyle (archaeologist) (1842–1911), Canadian educator and archaeologist
- David Boyle (author) (1958–2025), British economics author and journalist
- David Boyle (cricketer) (born 1961), New Zealand cricketer
- David Boyle (diplomat), (1883–1970), British intelligence officer
- David Boyle (footballer) (1929–2009), English professional footballer
- David Boyle, Lord Boyle (1772–1853), Scottish judge and privy counsellor of the United Kingdom
- David Boyle (rugby league, born 1959), Australian rugby league footballer for South Sydney
- David Boyle (rugby league, born 1971), Australian rugby league footballer for Canberra
