= Boil =

Boil or other variants may refer to:

- Boil (infection), an infection of the hair follicle
- Boiling, bringing a liquid to its boiling point
- Boil (album), 1996, by Foetus
- The Boils, an American band
- Boil, Bulgaria
- The Boil, a snow eminence on Reeves Neve, Victoria Land, New Zealand
- Shuizhu, a Sichuan Chinese dish also known as "water cooked" or "boil cuisine"

== See also ==
- Boyle (disambiguation)
- Hard Boiled (disambiguation)
