= Hard =

Hard means something that is difficult to do. It may also refer to:

- Hardness, resistance of physical materials to deformation or fracture
- Hard water, water with high mineral content

== Arts and entertainment ==
- Hard (band), a Hungarian hard rock supergroup
- Hard, 1998 film directed by John Huckert
- Hard (music festival), in the U.S.
- Hard (TV series), a French TV series

=== Albums and EPs ===
- Hard (Gang of Four album), 1983
- Hard (Jagged Edge album), 2003
- Hard (Shinee album), or its title track, 2023
- Hard, by Brainpower, 2008
- Hard, by Goodbye Mr Mackenzie, 1993
- Hard, by The Neighbourhood, 2017

=== Songs ===
- "Hard" (Rihanna song), 2009
- "Hard" (Sophie song), 2014
- "Hard", by FKA Twigs from Eusexua Afterglow, 2025
- "Hard", by Poppy from Zig, 2023
- "Hard", by Royce da 5'9" from Layers, 2016
- "Hard", by Why Don't We from 8 Letters, 2018

== Places ==
- Hard, Austria
- Hard (Zürich), Switzerland

== Other uses ==
- Hard (surname)
- Hard architecture, impersonal windowless buildings with graffiti-resistant walls usually associated with prisons and other secure structures
- Nickname of Masaki Sumitani ( HardGay / HardoGay )
- Hard (nautical), a beach or slope convenient for hauling out vessels
- hard, slang for an erection
- Hayward Area Recreation and Park District, California, U.S.
- Hard, consonants that are not palatalized

== See also ==
- Hardcourt or hard court, is a surface or floor on which a sport is played
- Hardtack
- Hardware (disambiguation)
- Computational hardness assumption
