= Edward Boyle =

Edward Boyle may refer to:

- Sir Edward Boyle, 1st Baronet (1848–1909), MP for Taunton 1906–1909, grandfather of Baron Boyle
- Edward Boyle, Baron Boyle of Handsworth (1923–1981), British Conservative Party politician, MP 1950–1970
- Edward C. Boyle (1904–1981), Allegheny County District Attorney for Pittsburgh from 1956 to 1964
- Edward Courtney Boyle (1883–1967), English Royal Navy officer, First World War recipient of the Victoria Cross
- Edward F. Boyle, (1876–1943) Borough president of Manhattan, New York in 1919
- Edward G. Boyle (1899–1977), Canadian set decorator
- Edward James Boyle Sr. (1913–2002), U.S. federal judge
- Edward Mayfield Boyle (1874–1936), Sierra Leone Creole medical doctor
- Eddie Boyle (1874–1941), American baseball catcher

== See also ==
- Boyle (disambiguation)
