= Scottish Arts Council =

Scottish arts funding public body

- Comhairle Ealain na h-Alba

Agency overview
- Formed: 1994
- Preceding agency: Arts Council of Great Britain
- Dissolved: 2010
- Superseding agency: Creative Scotland
- Headquarters: 12 Manor Place, Edinburgh EH3 7DD, United Kingdom
- Annual budget: £61.06 million (2009/10)
- Website: http://www.scottisharts.org.uk/ (not maintained after 1 July 2010)

The Scottish Arts Council (Scottish Gaelic: Comhairle Ealain na h-Alba), was a Scottish public body responsible for the funding, development and promotion of the arts in Scotland. The Council primarily distributed funding from the Scottish Government as well as National Lottery funds received via the Department for Culture, Media and Sport.

The Scottish Arts Council was formed in 1994 following a restructuring of the Arts Council of Great Britain, but had existed as an autonomous body since a royal charter of 1967. In 2010 it merged with Scottish Screen to form Creative Scotland.

== Activities ==
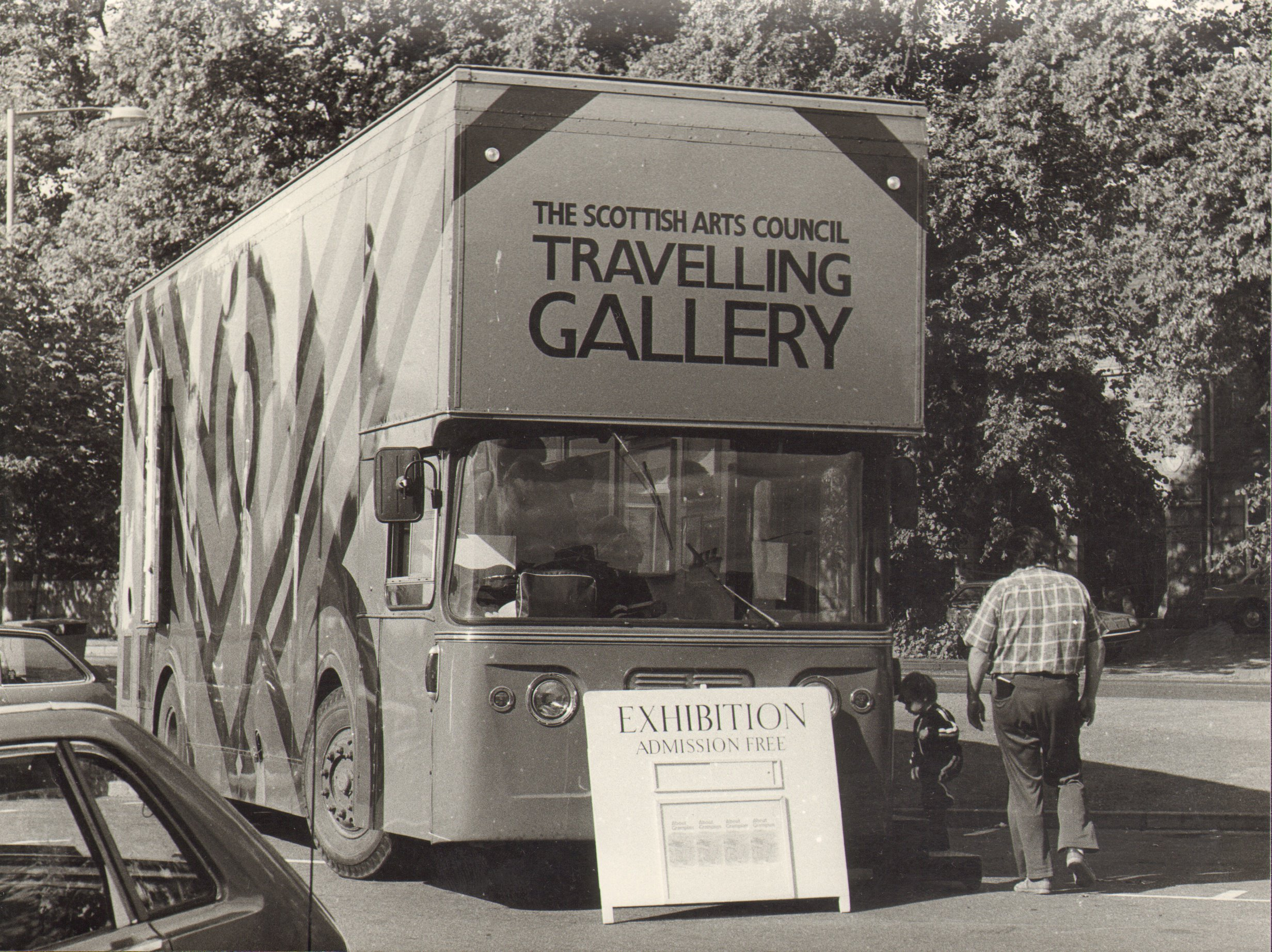
A bus converted into a travelling gallery for the Scottish Arts Council in 1982

The Council funded all the major areas of the arts, seeking to maintain balance between the many diverse communities of Scotland. In addition, it funded cultural groups and events affiliated with immigrant communities and minorities in Scotland. It sponsored two book awards:

- The Scottish Arts Council Book of the Year Award (worth £5,000); and
- The Scottish Arts Council Children's Book of the Year Award (worth £10,000).

The council was pivotal in forming policy for the nation in regard to Arts, Culture and Education after devolution, resulting in the seminal publication Arts Education: A Lifelong Learning Strategy. Published in 2004, this document articulated a national strategy to be put in place 2004–2009. It was crafted through "a year of rigorous discussion, thinking, drafting and re-drafting, and has been much informed by consultation with the wider world of education and the arts."

== Replacement of the Scottish Arts Council ==
In January 2006, it was announced that the Scottish Government would assume direct responsibility for the main national arts companies (Scottish Opera, Scottish Ballet, Royal Scottish National Orchestra, Scottish Chamber Orchestra) and that the Arts Council was to be replaced by a new body. This change was made in response to the report issued by the Cultural Commission chaired by James Boyle. The Scottish Arts Council was replaced by Creative Scotland on 1 July 2010.

== See also ==
- Arts Council England
- Arts Council of Northern Ireland
- Arts Council of Wales
