= Richard Boyle (soldier) =

Anglo-Irish Royalist officer (died 1649)

Lieutenant Colonel Richard Boyle (died 1649) was an Anglo-Irish Royalist officer who was murdered in Drogheda five days after the city fell to Oliver Cromwell's New Model Army.

== Biography ==
Boyle was the son of Richard Boyle, Archbishop of Tuam, and his wife Martha, daughter of Rice Wight of Brabouef Manor at Artington in Surrey and his wife Elizabeth Needler.

On 11 September 1649 Boyle was captured during the storming of Drogheda at the end of the siege. Five days later he was having dinner with Lady More (sister of John Gordon, Earl of Sutherland) when an English Parliamentary soldier entered the room and whispered something to him. Boyle stood up to follow the soldier, his hostess inquired where he was going, and he replied "Madam, to die". He was shot on leaving the room. In the opinion of Lady Antonia Fraser, this "was an answer in the great tradition of those Cavaliers who had died with honour and a jest on their lips in the Civil War".
