= Trevor van Riemsdyk =

American ice hockey player (born 1991)

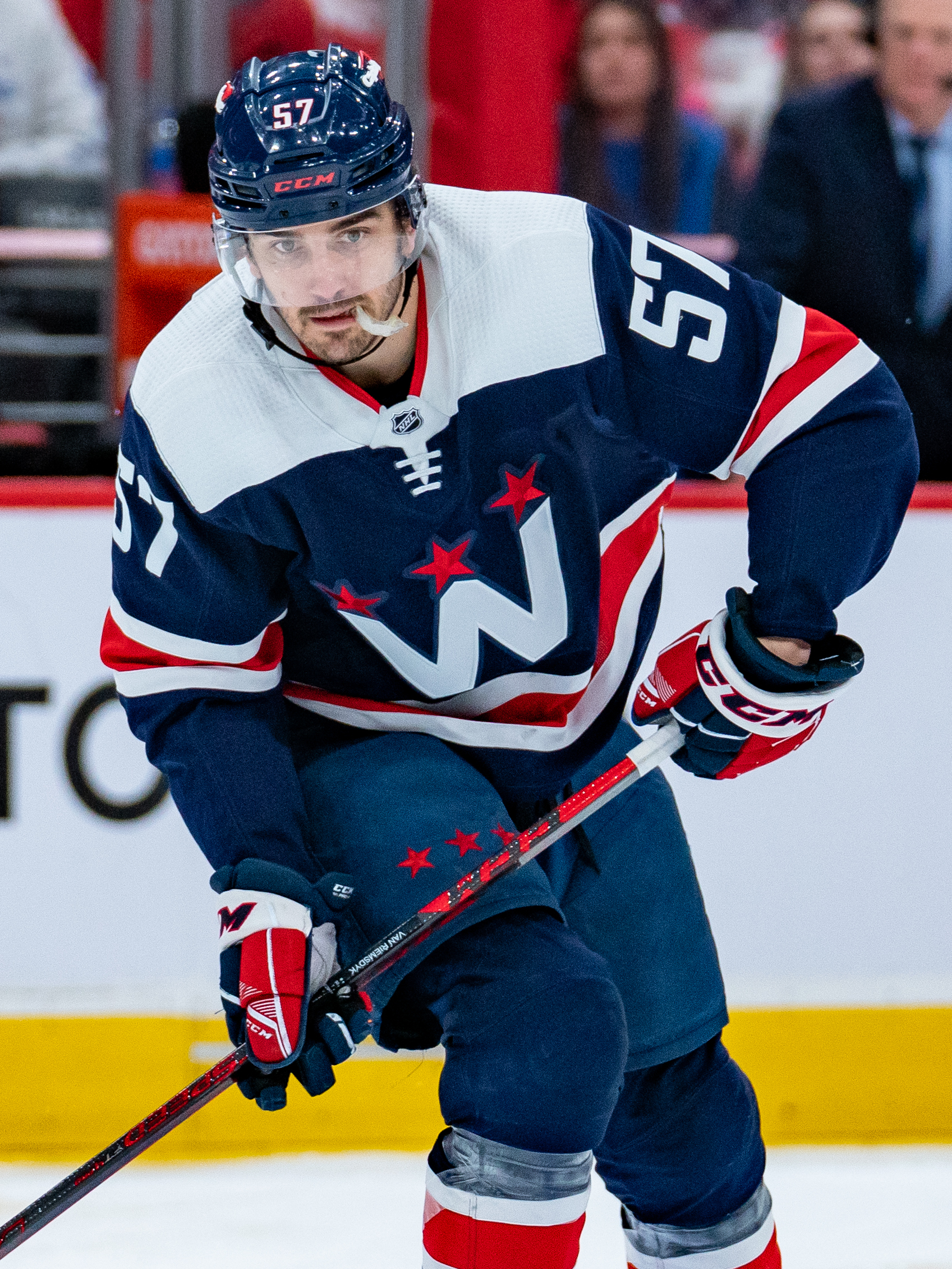
- Van Riemsdyk with the Washington Capitals in 2022
- Born: July 24, 1991 (age 35) Middletown, New Jersey, U.S.
- Height: 6 ft 2 in (188 cm)
- Weight: 187 lb (85 kg; 13 st 5 lb)
- Position: Defense
- Shoots: Right
- NHL team Former teams: Pittsburgh Penguins; Chicago Blackhawks; Carolina Hurricanes; Washington Capitals
- National team: United States
- NHL draft: Undrafted
- Playing career: 2014–present

Trevor van Riemsdyk (born July 24, 1991), often known by his initials TVR, is an American professional ice hockey player who is a defenseman for the Pittsburgh Penguins of the National Hockey League (NHL). He won the Stanley Cup in 2015, his rookie season, with the Chicago Blackhawks and has also played for the Carolina Hurricanes and Washington Capitals.

== Playing career ==
=== Amateur ===
Van Riemsdyk played high school hockey for Christian Brothers Academy in Lincroft, New Jersey. He left the school before his senior year to play for the New Hampshire Junior Monarchs of the Eastern Junior Hockey League (EJHL).

Van Riemsdyk played college hockey with the University of New Hampshire in the NCAA Men's Division I Hockey East conference. In his sophomore year, van Riemsdyk's outstanding play was rewarded with a selection to the 2012–13 All-Hockey East First Team.

=== Professional ===
On March 24, 2014, van Riemsdyk agreed to terms with the Chicago Blackhawks on a two-year, entry-level deal. He made his NHL debut on October 9, 2014, against the Dallas Stars.

On November 9, van Riemsdyk earned his first NHL point with an assist on a goal by Kris Versteeg in a 5–2 victory over the San Jose Sharks. On February 25, 2015, van Riemsdyk was moved from the Blackhawks to their American Hockey League (AHL) affiliate, the Rockford IceHogs, after recovering from a fractured patella suffered on November 19. Shortly after recovering, van Riemsdyk injured his wrist in April while playing for Rockford. He underwent successful surgery but missed two months whilst rehabilitating. van Riemsdyk was recalled by the Blackhawks on May 22. He made his playoff debut on June 8 in game three of the 2015 Stanley Cup Final. van Riemsdyk won his first Stanley Cup in his rookie season, as the Blackhawks defeated the Tampa Bay Lightning in six games.

On July 7, van Riemsdyk signed a two-year contract extension to remain with the Blackhawks. In the 2015–16 season, on October 10, van Riemsdyk scored his first NHL career goal against Jean-François Bérubé of the New York Islanders.

On April 23, 2016, van Riemsdyk scored his first NHL career playoff goal in game six in the first round of the 2016 playoffs against the St. Louis Blues.

Having been exposed by the Blackhawks at the 2017 NHL Expansion Draft, van Riemsdyk was selected by the Vegas Golden Knights on June 21, 2017. The following day, he was traded by the Golden Knights along with a seventh-round pick in the 2018 NHL entry draft to the Carolina Hurricanes in exchange for a second-round pick in the 2017 NHL entry draft. On July 5, 2018, he signed a two-year, $4.6 million contract extension with the Hurricanes.

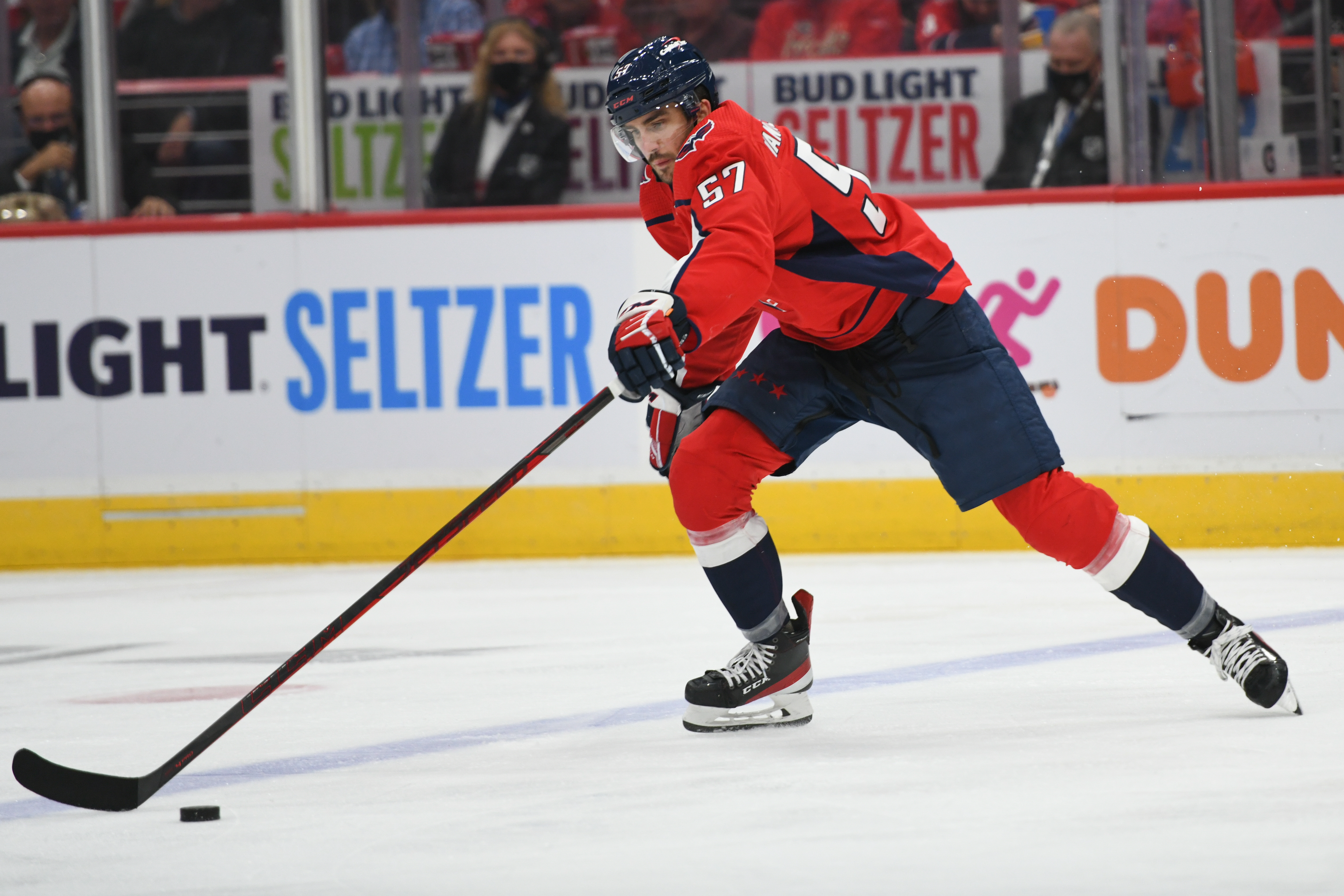
Van Riemsdyk with the Washington Capitals in 2021

After three seasons with the Hurricanes, van Riemsdyk left as a free agent to sign a one-year, $800,000 contract with the Washington Capitals on October 11, 2020. In his first season in Washington in 2020–21 NHL season, van Riemsdyk was limited to 20 regular season games, posting 3 points. On March 21, 2021, van Riemsdyk signed a two-year, $1.9 million extension with the Capitals.

In the 2022–23 NHL season while in the midst of recording new career highs offensively for the second consecutive season, van Riemsdyk was re-signed to a three-year, $9 million contract extension on March 11, 2023.

After six seasons with the Capitals, van Riemsdyk left as a free agent to sign a two-year, $8 million contract with the Pittsburgh Penguins on July 1, 2026.

== Personal life ==
He is the younger brother of James van Riemsdyk who plays in the NHL for the Detroit Red Wings. A third brother, Brendan van Riemsdyk, played hockey at New Hampshire before transferring to Northeastern. The boys were born to Frans and Allison van Riemsdyk. Frans was born in the Netherlands and raised in New Jersey.

Van Riemsdyk is the You Can Play ambassador for the Capitals. The organization works to eliminate homophobia in sports. After then Arizona Coyotes defenseman Travis Dermott defied the NHL's ban on "pride tape," van Riemsdyk praised the move and said he had been brainstorming how to get around the ban prior to the league lifting it in response to Dermott's actions.

== Career statistics ==
=== Regular season and playoffs ===
			Regular season					Playoffs
Season	Team	League	GP	G	A	Pts	PIM	GP	G	A	Pts	PIM
2007–08	Christian Brothers Academy	HS-NJ	27	9	39	48	12	—	—	—	—	—
2008–09	Christian Brothers Academy	HS-NJ	29	11	47	58	18	—	—	—	—	—
2009–10	New Hampshire Jr. Monarchs	EJHL	31	8	27	35	4	4	0	3	3	0
2010–11	New Hampshire Jr. Monarchs	EJHL	39	16	22	38	20	6	2	3	5	4
2011–12	University of New Hampshire	HE	37	4	15	19	24	—	—	—	—	—
2012–13	University of New Hampshire	HE	39	8	25	33	8	—	—	—	—	—
2013–14	University of New Hampshire	HE	26	4	19	23	10	—	—	—	—	—
2014–15	Chicago Blackhawks	NHL	18	0	1	1	2	4	0	0	0	0
2014–15	Rockford IceHogs	AHL	8	0	3	3	0	—	—	—	—	—
2015–16	Chicago Blackhawks	NHL	82	3	11	14	31	7	1	0	1	2
2016–17	Chicago Blackhawks	NHL	58	5	11	16	29	4	0	0	0	0
2017–18	Carolina Hurricanes	NHL	79	3	13	16	20	—	—	—	—	—
2018–19	Carolina Hurricanes	NHL	78	3	11	14	10	9	0	0	0	2
2019–20	Carolina Hurricanes	NHL	49	1	7	8	10	2	0	1	1	4
2020–21	Washington Capitals	NHL	20	1	2	3	2	—	—	—	—	—
2021–22	Washington Capitals	NHL	72	1	16	17	40	6	1	1	2	0
2022–23	Washington Capitals	NHL	75	7	16	23	15	—	—	—	—	—
2023–24	Washington Capitals	NHL	70	0	14	14	18	3	0	0	0	0
2024–25	Washington Capitals	NHL	82	1	20	21	34	10	0	2	2	4
2025–26	Washington Capitals	NHL	68	3	11	14	18	—	—	—	—	—
NHL totals			751	28	133	161	229	45	2	4	6	12

=== International ===
Year	Team	Event	Result	GP	G	A	Pts	PIM
2017	United States	WC	5th	8	0	0	0	2
Senior totals				8	0	0	0	2

== Awards and honors ==
Award	Year	Ref
College
All-Hockey East Rookie Team	2012	
All-Hockey East First Team	2013	
AHCA East First-Team All-American	2013	
NHL
Stanley Cup champion	2015	
