= Tommy Boyle =

Tommy Boyle may refer to:

- Tommy Boyle (footballer, born 1886) (1886–1940), football player who played for Barnsley, Burnley, and Wrexham
- Tommy Boyle (footballer, born 1901) (1901–1972), football player who played for Sheffield United, Manchester United, and Northampton Town
- Thomas Boyle (1775–1825), U.S. Navy officer
- Thomas Boyle (badminton), Irish badminton player
