= James van Riemsdyk =

American ice hockey player (born 1989)

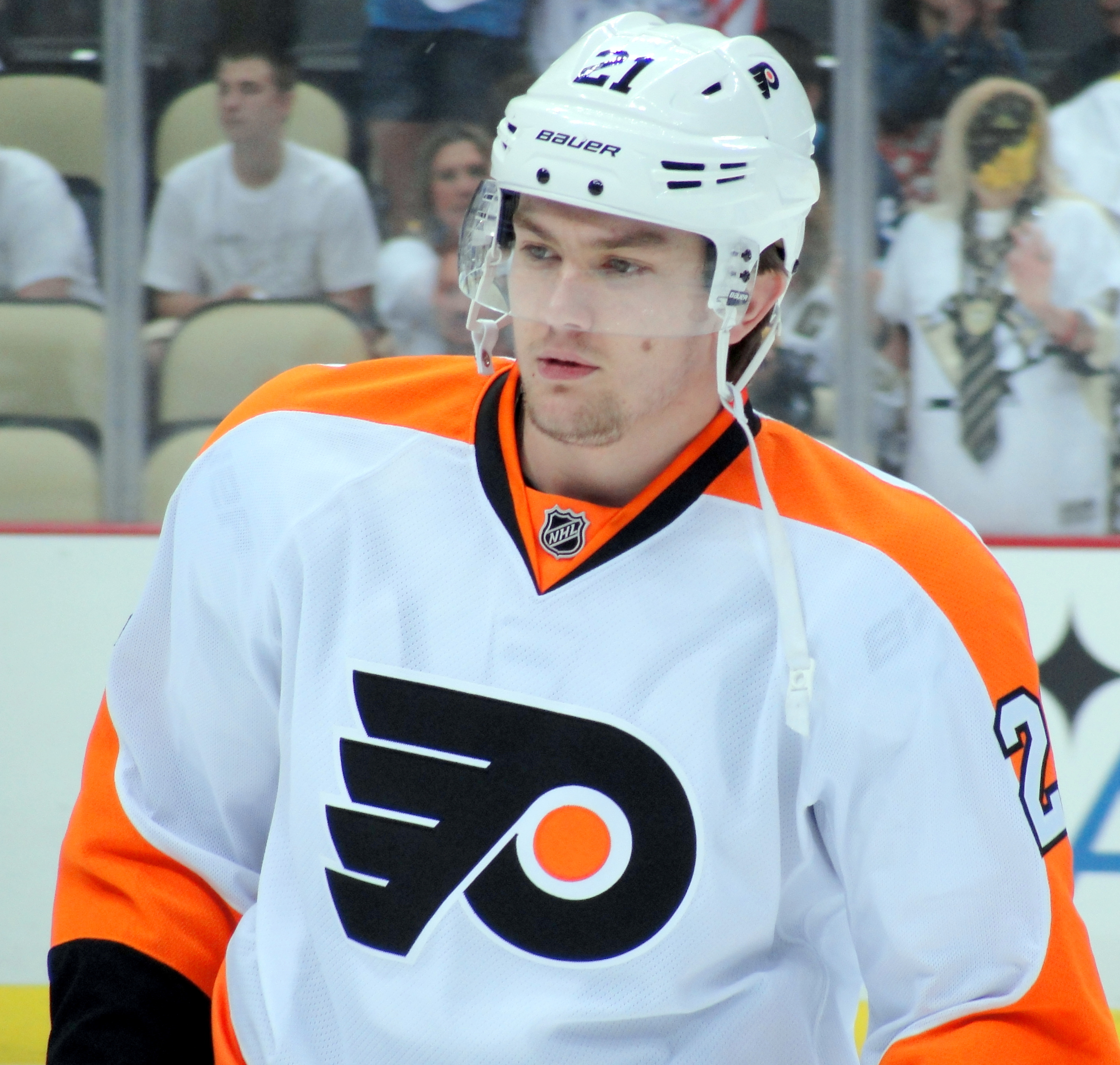
- Van Riemsdyk with the Philadelphia Flyers in 2012
- Born: May 4, 1989 (age 37) Middletown Township, New Jersey, U.S.
- Height: 6 ft 3 in (191 cm)
- Weight: 217 lb (98 kg; 15 st 7 lb)
- Position: Left wing
- Shoots: Left
- NHL team Former teams: Free agent Philadelphia Flyers; Toronto Maple Leafs; Boston Bruins; Columbus Blue Jackets; Detroit Red Wings
- National team: United States
- NHL draft: 2nd overall, 2007; Philadelphia Flyers
- Playing career: 2009–present

James van Riemsdyk (/væn ˈriːmzdaɪk/ van REEMZ-dighk; born May 4, 1989), often known by his initials JVR, is an American professional ice hockey player who is a left winger and currently an unrestricted free agent. He most recently played for the Detroit Red Wings of the National Hockey League (NHL). He has previously played for the Philadelphia Flyers, Toronto Maple Leafs, Boston Bruins and Columbus Blue Jackets.

Van Riemsdyk was born in Middletown, New Jersey, and played minor ice hockey with local clubs through his childhood. As an adolescent, he left Christian Brothers Academy in New Jersey to move to Ann Arbor, Michigan and play with the USA Hockey National Team Development Program. There, he befriended Patrick Kane, and the pair would go on to be drafted first and second overall in the 2007 NHL entry draft. Rather than start playing with the Flyers at once, van Riemsdyk played college ice hockey for the University of New Hampshire for two seasons. After leading the team in scoring as a sophomore, he forfeited his final two years of college hockey and signed an entry- level contract with the Flyers, including a tryout contract with the Philadelphia Phantoms. Van Riemsdyk made his NHL debut in 2009, and turned a pair of strong playoff performances for the Flyers before a series of injuries kept him sidelined for most of the 2011–12 season.

During the 2012 offseason, the Flyers traded van Riemsdyk to the Maple Leafs in exchange for defenseman Luke Schenn. He was called up to the top line that fall to replace an injured Joffrey Lupul, but remained there alongside Tyler Bozak and Phil Kessel through the 2014–15 NHL season. When Mike Babcock took over as head coach, he paired van Riemsdyk with two-way forwards Nazem Kadri and Leo Komarov, and van Riemsdyk was on track for a career season when a foot fracture shut him down in January. The next two seasons, van Riemsdyk set a personal record first in single-season point totals and then in single season goals. He also reached a number of milestones, including his 200th career NHL goal and the 20,000th goal in Maple Leafs history.

Van Riemsdyk became a free agent after the 2017–18 season, and he signed a five-year contract with the Flyers that July. In his first season back, van Riemsdyk was sidelined for 16 games with a lower-body injury, but he returned for 27 goals, including a pair of hat tricks. The following two seasons were a series of goal droughts followed by hot streaks. In February 2021, van Riemsdyk scored his 500th career NHL point. In addition to his NHL career, van Riemsdyk has represented the United States at a number of international tournaments, including the 2014 Winter Olympics.

== Early life ==
Van Riemsdyk was born on May 4, 1989, in Middletown, New Jersey, to parents Frans and Allison van Riemsdyk. His family, particularly his father, were strong supporters of the New York Rangers of the National Hockey League (NHL). Van Riemsdyk began playing ice hockey around the age of five, practicing at a rink in Old Bridge, New Jersey. From there, he spent three years playing minor ice hockey with the American Eagles of the Monmouth County Youth Hockey Association, followed by six years with the Brick Hockey Club in Brick Township, New Jersey. During his tenure with the Brick Stars, James and his brother Trevor took the club to a national championship.

His hockey career continued at Christian Brothers Academy (CBA) in Lincroft, New Jersey, where he made the varsity team as a freshman in high school. He continued to play with Brick, serving as the team captain for the 2004–05 Midget AA season and leading the team to the Atlantic District Championship. That same year, van Riemsdyk was part of the New Jersey Parochial championship-winning team at CBA. In 2013, the Ocean Ice Palace in New Jersey, where van Riemsdyk had skated throughout his childhood, retired his No. 21 jersey.

Following the 2004–05 hockey season, van Riemsdyk left CBA to join the USA Hockey National Team Development Program (NTDP) in Ann Arbor, Michigan. In his two seasons with the NTDP, van Riemsdyk scored 65 goals and 124 points, tying for fifth- and seventh-highest in program history at the time, respectively. While playing for Team USA, van Riemsdyk became friends with future Chicago Blackhawks star Patrick Kane.

== Playing career ==
=== Amateur ===
Heading into the 2007 NHL entry draft, the NHL Central Scouting Bureau ranked van Riemsdyk as the third-best North American skater out of all available prospects, behind Kane and Kyle Turris. Kane was the first overall draft pick that year, taken by the Blackhawks, while the Philadelphia Flyers drafted van Riemsdyk second overall. Rather than immediately enter the professional leagues, van Riemsdyk chose to honor his commitment to the University of New Hampshire, where he was roommates with Capitals draft pick Phil DeSimone.

As a freshman at New Hampshire during the 2007–08 NCAA season, van Riemsdyk was third on the team with 34 points – 11 goals and 23 assists – in 31 games. He received two Hockey East Rookie of the Month selections, in January and March, and was a Hockey East All-Rookie Team selection. New Hampshire was defeated that year in the NCAA tournament by Notre Dame in the regional semifinal round. The following year, van Riemsdyk led New Hampshire in scoring, with 17 goals and 23 assists before he decided to pursue professional hockey.

=== Professional ===
==== Philadelphia Flyers ====
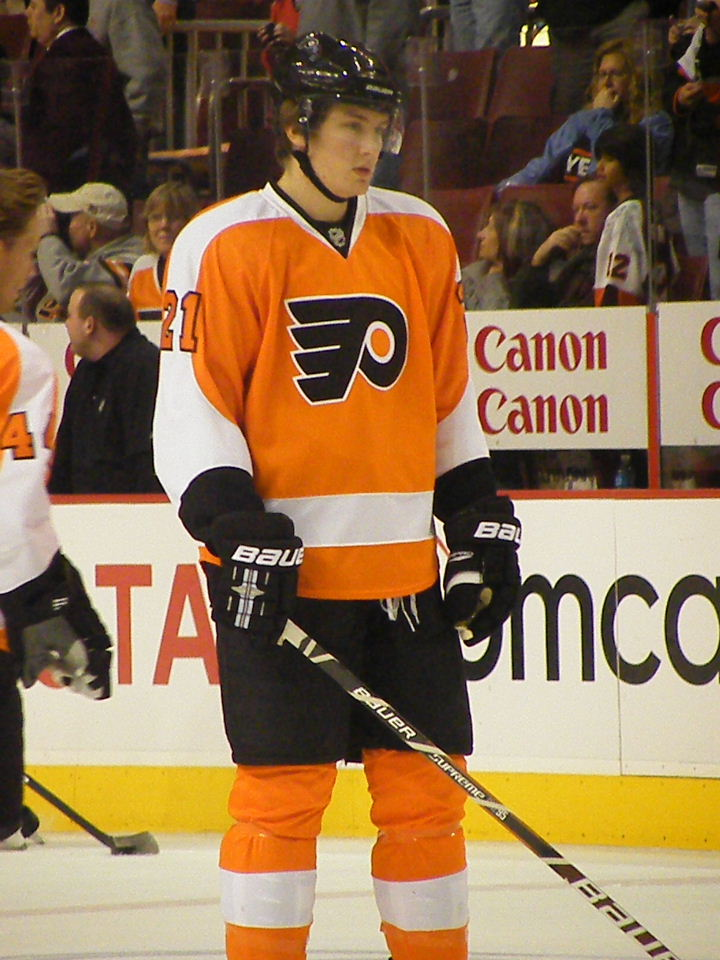
Van Riemsdyk as a rookie in 2009

On April 1, 2009, van Riemsdyk agreed to forfeit his final two years of collegiate play in order to sign an entry-level contract with the Flyers. Although his contract did not go into effect until the 2009–10 season, meaning that van Riemsdyk was barred from participating in the 2009 Stanley Cup playoffs, he was allowed to play with the Philadelphia Phantoms for the remainder of the American Hockey League (AHL) season under a tryout contract. He played in seven regular-season games for the Phantoms, scoring one goal and one assist, but went scoreless during the Calder Cup playoffs. Van Riemsdyk continued to impress Flyers coach John Stevens during training camp, scoring four goals and an assist during a September 11 preseason game against the Washington Capitals.

Van Riemsdyk began the 2009–10 season serving on a line with Darroll Powe and prolific sophomore Claude Giroux. He made his NHL debut on October 2, 2009, picking up his first NHL point with a power play assist in the Flyers' 2–0 win against the Carolina Hurricanes. On October 24, he scored his first NHL goal in the third period of a 5–1 rout of the Florida Panthers. Van Riemsdyk continued his momentum through the month of November, scoring four goals and five assists in 12 games to be named the NHL Rookie of the Month. After scoring 18 points over his first 16 NHL games, Van Riemsdyk entered a prolonged scoring drought, with one goal in a 22-game stretch. He regained his momentum by late December, and by January 22, van Riemsdyk was a serious contender for the Calder Memorial Trophy, awarded to the top rookie in the NHL. He was third in scoring at the time, behind Matt Duchene and John Tavares, while playing fewer minutes per game. By the end of the season, van Riemsdyk had mostly fallen out of Calder Contention, but he received three points in trophy voting, tying for 11th place. He finished the season with 15 goals and 35 points in 78 games. In his first playoff appearance, van Riemsdyk was part of a massive comeback effort as the Flyers, down 3–0 at the start of the 2010 Eastern Conference semifinals, battled to Game 7. Van Riemsdyk scored his first career playoff goal in the first period of Game 7, shifting the momentum to the Flyers and helping them advance to the Eastern Conference finals. It was the first time that a team had come back from a 3–0 deficit to win an NHL playoff series since the New York Islanders defeated the Pittsburgh Penguins in 1975. The Flyers ultimately advanced to the 2010 Stanley Cup Finals, whereupon they fell to the Chicago Blackhawks. In 21 playoff games as a rookie, van Riemsdyk scored three goals and three assists.

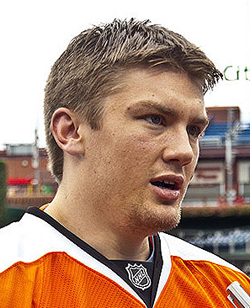
Van Riemsdyk in 2011

Van Riemsdyk continued his offensive trajectory during his sophomore 2010–11 season, scoring 21 goals in 75 games. On February 15, 2011, van Riemsdyk landed his first Gordie Howe hat trick, registering a goal, an assist, and a fight in a 4–3 shootout win against the Tampa Bay Lightning. The fight was also the first of van Riemsdyk's NHL career, as he defended Giroux against former Flyer Randy Jones. His first regular hat-trick came the following month, with three goals in the Flyers' 4–1 victory over the New York Islanders on March 26, 2011. In the 2011 Eastern Conference quarterfinals, van Riemsdyk once again provided a critical Game 7 playoff performance for the Flyers, playing a role in three goals of the series-winning 5–2 win over the Buffalo Sabres. The Flyers took the Bruins to seven games in the semifinals as well, with van Riemsdyk netting two goals to take the final game into overtime, but the Bruins ultimately took the series 3–2 in overtime.

As he entered his third season of professional hockey, van Riemsdyk became representative of the modern power forward. Unlike figures like Eric Lindros and John LeClair, he and other contemporary power forwards utilized their speed and agility as much as their strength. His effectiveness was limited, however, by a variety of injuries, including a hip problem, a concussion, an oblique strain, and a rib cage strain, that forced van Riemsdyk to miss a total of 43 games in both the regular 2011–12 season and the playoffs. Most debilitating was a fractured left foot that van Riemsdyk sustained on March 1, 2012, while blocking a shot in a game against the Islanders. The fracture required surgery, taking van Riemsdyk out of the lineup for the remainder of the regular season. This also interrupted the rhythm the Flyers had established with their "kid line", consisting of young forwards van Riemsdyk, Brayden Schenn, and Jakub Voráček. In the 43 games he did play, van Riemsdyk scored 11 goals and 13 assists, including one goal and one assist during the 2012 Stanley Cup playoffs.

==== Toronto Maple Leafs ====
Following his injury-riddled season, van Riemsdyk spent the 2012 offseason as the subject of a number of trade rumors, with some sports journalists speculating that he would be sent to the Columbus Blue Jackets in exchange for Rick Nash. On June 23, van Riemsdyk was traded to the Toronto Maple Leafs in exchange for defenseman Luke Schenn. His Toronto debut was delayed due to the 2012-13 NHL lockout, but when the season began, van Riemsdyk proceeded to score eight goals in his first 14 games. He was placed on the third line with Nazem Kadri and Leo Komarov to start the season, but soon replaced an injured Joffrey Lupul on the top line with Phil Kessel and Tyler Bozak. He finished the 48-game regular season with 18 goals and 14 assists, and helped take the Leafs to their first playoff appearance since 2005. In the Leafs' first-round playoff series against the Bruins, van Riemsdyk contributed two goals and three assists, including a pair of assists to force a game seven. The Bruins captured the series with a 5–4 overtime win in game seven.

Van Riemsdyk began the 2013–14 season on a line with Bozak and Kessel, a trio that provided an early offensive boost to the Maple Leafs. In his first eight games, van Riemsdyk alone scored eight points. On March 29, 2014, van Riemsdyk tied the NHL record for the fastest goal from the start of a period, scoring against Steve Mason of the Flyers four seconds into the second period. He joined Claude Provost in 1957 and Denis Savard of 1986 as the third player to accomplish the feat. This was also the first season that van Riemsdyk scored 30 or more goals during his NHL career. The milestone came on April 3, 2014, in a 4–3 overtime victory over the Bruins. Although an eight-game losing streak at the end of the season caused the Leafs to miss the playoffs, Van Riemsdyk posted the best season of his career, with 30 goals and 30 assists in 80 games.

The top line of van Riemsdyk, Kessel, and Bozak continued to play together into the 2014–15 NHL season, to inconsistent results. By mid-December, despite boasting a 15 percent scoring percentage, the line's collective plus–minus stood at −8. The Leafs struggled throughout the season, finishing 27th overall in the league, while van Riemsdyk dropped to 27 goals and 29 assists, as well as a −33 personal plus–minus. Despite these overall setbacks, the season brought a pair of milestones for van Riemsdyk. On October 31, 2014, he played against his brother Trevor for the first time in the pair's NHL careers, as the Leafs faced the Blackhawks. Shortly afterwards, on November 4, 2014, van Riemsdyk scored his 200th career point in a game against the Arizona Coyotes. That same night, the man he had been traded for, Luke Schenn, scored his 100th career point against the Edmonton Oilers.

The Leafs underwent a change of management prior to the 2015–16 season, with Mike Babcock taking over as head coach. He moved van Riemsdyk onto a line with two-way forwards Kadri and Komarov, which strengthened all three players as they balanced offensive and defensive roles. On January 11, 2016, the Leafs announced that van Riemsdyk had suffered a "non-displaced fracture" in his left foot, and that he would be sidelined for up to two months as he recovered. As his recovery process dragged on, however, with van Riemsdyk still requiring crutches and a walking boot over a month later, the Leafs shut him down for the season on February 25. Prior to his injury, he had been on track for a career-best season, with 14 goals and 29 points in the 40 games that he did play.

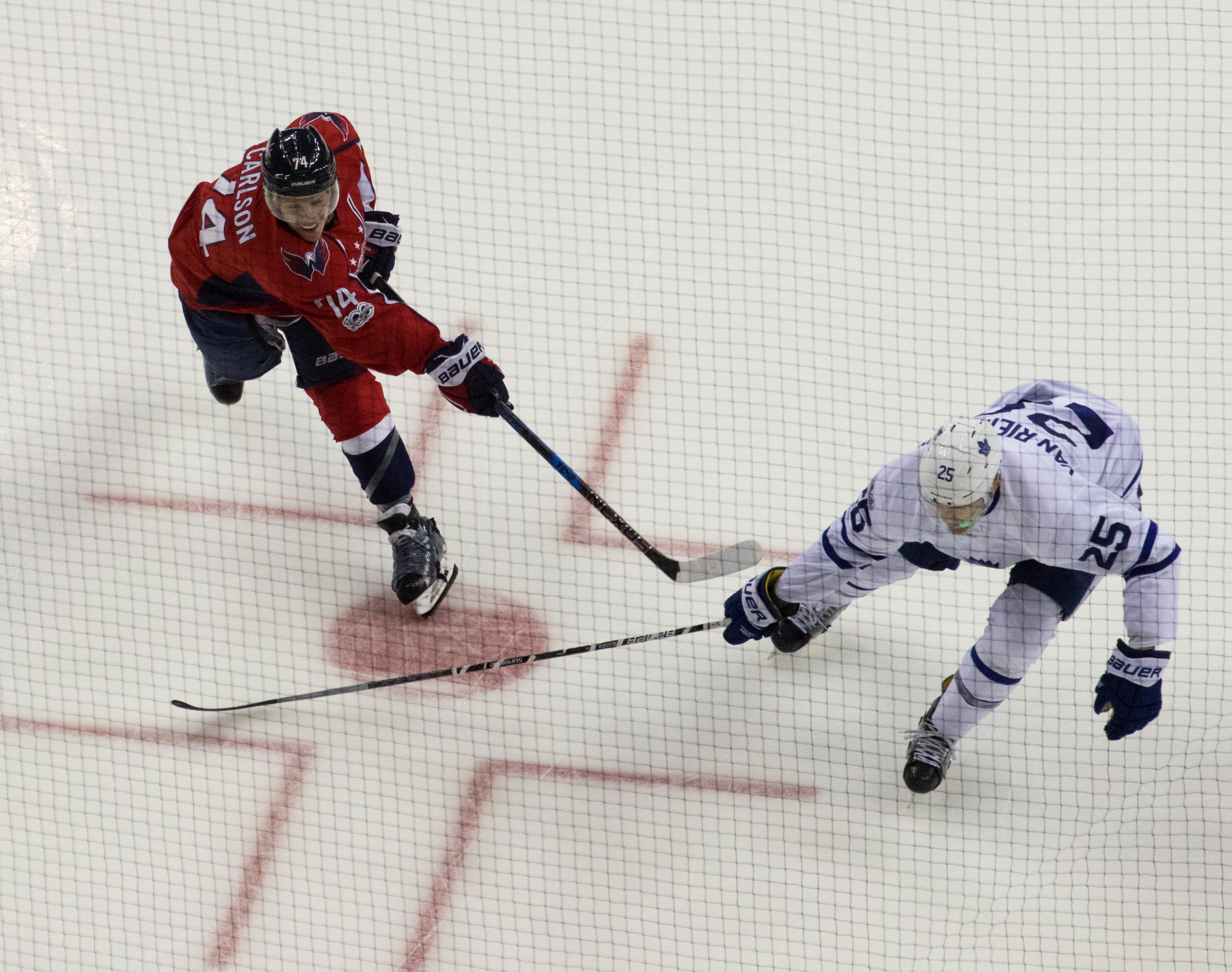
Van Riemsdyk (right) with the Toronto Maple Leafs, defending John Carlson during the 2017 Stanley Cup playoffs.

Van Riemsdyk entered the 2016–17 season fully healed from his foot fracture, and eager to begin playing alongside rising stars like Auston Matthews and Mitch Marner. Shortly before the season began, van Riemsdyk changed his jersey number from No. 21, which he had been wearing since he was 10 years old, to No. 25, as the former sweater was retired on behalf of Borje Salming. As a veteran on the Leafs that season, van Riemsdyk set a personal-best 62 points, contributing 29 goals and 33 assists over the course of the year. Bozak served as van Riemsdyk's primary center during the 2016–17 and 2017–18 seasons, and he also spent time on a line with Marner and Connor Brown. After dropping their final regular-season game 3–2 to the Columbus Blue Jackets, the Leafs faced the Capitals in the first round of the 2017 Stanley Cup playoffs. Washington eliminated Toronto with an overtime win in game six.

Going into the 2017–18 season, van Riemsdyk was part of a strong forward group meant to carry the team offensively. On December 19, 2017, van Riemsdyk scored the 20,000th goal in Maple Leafs history with the third goal in an 8–1 defeat of the Hurricanes. The milestone also came on the 100th anniversary of the first goal in Toronto history, with Reg Noble of the Arenas scoring the franchise's first goal on December 19, 1917. His third career hat-trick came later that season, in a 6–5 victory over the Dallas Stars on March 14, 2018. In the next game, van Riemsdyk's second goal in a 5–2 victory over the Buffalo Sabres was his 31st of the season, passing his previous single-season high. Van Riemsdyk's 200th career NHL goal came that same month, in a 4–3 win over the Florida Panthers on March 28. The victory also helped set a new franchise record for the Leafs, as it was their 27th season win on home ice. He finished the year with 54 points, including a career-high 36 goals. The Leafs faced the Bruins again in the first round of the 2018 Stanley Cup playoffs, with the Bruins taking the series in seven games.

==== Second stint with Philadelphia ====
On July 1, 2018, van Riemsdyk, who had become an unrestricted free agent at the conclusion of the 2017–18 season, signed a $35 million, five-year contract with the Philadelphia Flyers. On October 6, 2018, in only his second game back with the Flyers, van Riemsdyk took a puck to the leg during a game against the Colorado Avalanche and was expected to be out for five to six weeks. He missed 16 games before returning to the ice on November 15, playing on a line with Jordan Weal and Wayne Simmonds for a game against the New Jersey Devils. On February 8, 2019, the NHL Department of Player Safety fined van Riemsdyk $5,000, the maximum amount allowable under the collective bargaining agreement, for a high-sticking penalty against Alec Martinez of the Los Angeles Kings. Despite these setbacks, van Riemsdyk proved to be a strong offensive generator during the 2018–19 season. Between January 10 and March 16, 2019, van Riemsdyk scored 27 points in 28 games, including 18 goals. Six of those goals came from a pair of hat-tricks: the first against the Minnesota Wild on January 14, and the second against the Maple Leafs on March 15. In his first season back with Philadelphia, van Riemsdyk scored 27 goals and 48 points in 66 games.

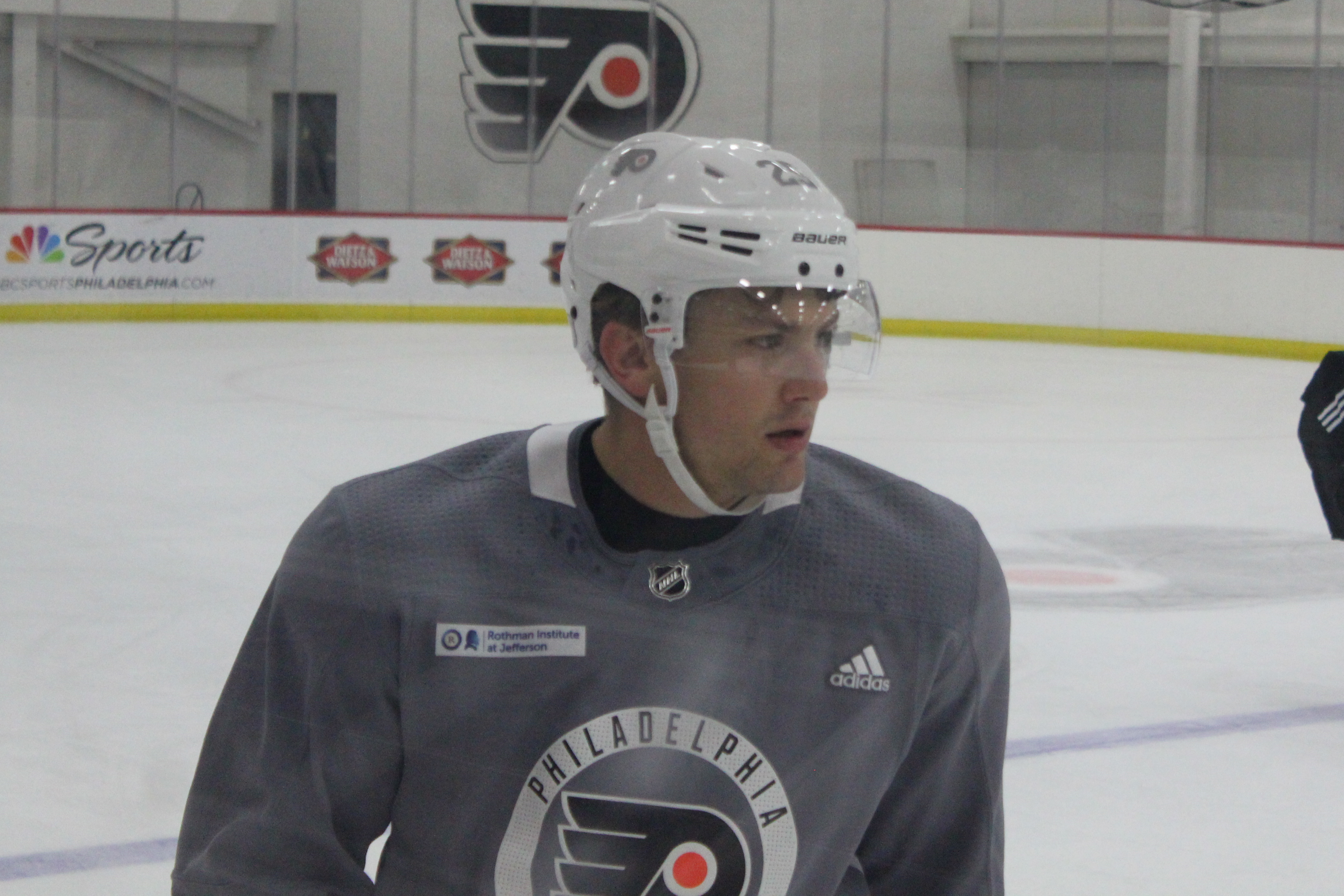
Van Riemsdyk skating with the Flyers in 2018

Van Riemsdyk took a step back in the 2019–20 season, scoring 19 goals and 40 points. His performance was prone to streaks: for instance, after starting the season with seven pointless games, van Riemsdyk then scored six points in his next three games. In the 66 regular season games that van Riemsdyk played, he posted three separate droughts of seven games or more without registering a point. Each drought was subsequently followed by a surge: six points in three games, 14 points in 13 games, and 15 points in 14 games. On March 4, 2020, while blocking a shot from Capitals defenseman Jonas Siegenthaler, van Riemsdyk fractured the index finger on his right hand, and he was expected to be out for the remainder of the regular season. On March 12, the NHL season was suspended indefinitely due to the COVID-19 pandemic. When the NHL resumed for the 2020 Stanley Cup playoffs in Toronto, van Riemsdyk was one of 31 Flyers selected to play in the "bubble". He failed to score any goals during the quarterfinal series against the Montreal Canadiens, and was a healthy scratch for multiple games. His first postseason goal came during game five of the Flyers' semifinal series, an ultimate 4–3 overtime win against the Islanders. The Islanders took the series in seven games.

As the continued effects of the COVID-19 pandemic reduced the 2020–21 NHL season to 56 regular-season games, in which the Flyers only played the seven other teams in the East Division, van Riemsdyk's focus was on starting the season strong. He was named the NHL East Division Star of the Month for January 2021, after leading the league with four power-play goals in the first 10 games of the season, leading the Flyers to 15 points. It was the most points the team had recorded in the first 10 games of a season since 2002–03. Being placed on a line with Joel Farabee and Scott Laughton improved van Riemsdyk's scoring and playmaking abilities, as he led all NHL forwards with 4.02 assists per 60 minutes through the first 11 games of the season. Van Riemsdyk's 500th career point came on February 21, 2021, in the Flyers' 7–3 loss to the Bruins at the NHL Outdoors at Lake Tahoe game. The middle of the season brought another extended goal drought for van Riemsdyk, who went 17 games without a goal before scoring on a breakaway against the Capitals on April 17. On April 22, van Riemsdyk scored a goal when a shot from Travis Konecny deflected off of Rangers defenseman K'Andre Miller's stick, hit him in the face, and deflected off of his face into the net. Van Riemsdyk underwent X-rays to examine the extent of the injury and was able to return by the third period, where he scored another goal in the 3–2 win. In the shortened season, van Riemsdyk scored 43 points, tying Giroux and Voráček for the team lead.

==== Boston Bruins ====
As a free agent, van Riemsdyk left the Flyers for the second time in his career by signing to a one-year, $1 million contract with the Boston Bruins on July 1, 2023. He played his 1,000th NHL game on March 5, 2024. Van Riemsdyk played in his 1000th career game on March 5, 2024, against the Edmonton Oilers. He was honored for the feat three games later in a pregame ceremony before the Bruins took on his former team, the Flyers.

==== Columbus Blue Jackets ====
On September 15, 2024, van Riemsdyk signed as a free agent to a one-year, $900,000 contract with the Columbus Blue Jackets for the 2024–25 season.

==== Detroit Red Wings ====
On July 1, 2025, van Riemsdyk signed a one-year, $1 million contract with the Detroit Red Wings for the 2025–26 season.

== International play ==
Medal record

Men's ice hockey

Representing the United States

World Junior Championships
Bronze medal – third place	2007 Sweden	

IIHF U18 Championships
Silver medal – second place	2007 Finland	
Gold medal – first place	2006 Sweden	

World U-17 Hockey Challenge
Silver medal – second place	2006 Saskatchewan	

=== Junior ===
Van Riemsdyk first represented the United States internationally at the 2006 World U-17 Hockey Challenge, where he scored a pair of goals to beat Team Canada Pacific and take the United States to the gold-medal match. He was one of two members of Team USA, alongside goaltender Brad Philips, to be named to the World Hockey Challenge All-Star Team. Quebec ultimately defeated the United States 5–2 in the gold medal match. That same year, he appeared at the 2006 IIHF World U18 Championships, scoring one assist in six games for the gold medal-winning team.

In 2007, van Riemsdyk returned to the World U18 Championships, tying for the tournament lead with 12 points and helping take Team USA to a silver medal. Van Riemsdyk was named both the top forward in the tournament and the most valuable player, and he received a selection to the tournament All-Star team. 2007 was also the year of van Riemsdyk's first World Junior Ice Hockey Championships (WJC) appearance. He played in four games of the series, recording one goal, and Team USA took home the bronze medal. Van Riemsdyk also appeared at the 2008 and 2009 WJC tournaments. Although Team USA failed to medal at both tournaments, van Riemsdyk led all players in scoring in 2008, with 11 points in six games, and he put up another 10 points the following year.

=== Senior ===
Van Riemsdyk's first senior international appearance came when he was chosen to represent the United States at the 2011 IIHF World Championship in Slovakia. He was added four games into the qualifying rounds, after the Bruins swept the Flyers in the Stanley Cup playoffs. Van Riemsdyk recorded one goal in his two tournament games, and Team USA was defeated by the Czech Republic in the quarterfinal round. His next international appearance was in 2014, representing Team USA at the Winter Olympics in Sochi. There, he spent most of his minutes on a line with Maple Leafs teammate Phil Kessel and San Jose Sharks center Joe Pavelski. Although the United States fell short of a medal, the van Riemsdyk—Kessel—Pavelski line put up a combined 20 points, whereas no other American player scored more than four points during the 2014 Olympic run.

In 2016, van Riemsdyk was named to Team USA once again for the World Cup of Hockey. He scored one assist in three games during the series, and the team was eliminated after losing its first three games in the preliminary round. He did not return to the international stage until the 2019 IIHF World Championship, where he put up two goals and three assists in eight games for Team USA. The United States team was defeated by Russia in a 4–3 quarterfinal matchup.

== Personal life ==
Van Riemsdyk married his longtime girlfriend, Lauren Tjernlund, on July 19, 2019. Their first child, Scarlett Everly van Riemsdyk, was born on May 2, 2020. During the hockey season, the van Riemsdyks live in the Society Hill neighborhood of Philadelphia, and they keep a summer home in Minnesota. During the offseason, van Riemsdyk plays in the Da Beauty League, a "glorified pickup game" in Edina, Minnesota. van Riesmdyk has two younger brothers who also play professional ice hockey. Trevor is a defenseman who plays for the Washington Capitals. Brendan played college hockey at the University of New Hampshire and Northeastern University before signing a contract with the Reading Royals of the ECHL in August 2020.

On November 24, 2012, van Riemsdyk played for Team Philly/New Jersey as part of Operation Hat Trick, a charity hockey game held at Boardwalk Hall in Atlantic City, New Jersey to raise money for those impacted by Hurricane Sandy. The next month, he and former Flyer Scott Hartnell engaged in a fundraising competition for Hurricane Sandy relief. In 2020, van Riemsdyk contributed to the PHL COVID-19 fund, aimed at providing grants to organizations serving high-risk populations in the greater Philadelphia area. In 2017, van Riemsdyk was appointed as the Maple Leafs' ambassador for the You Can Play program, an organization made to support LGBTQ individuals and reduce homophobia in sports. He told reporters that his goal as a You Can Play ambassador was to enforce respect in the greater hockey culture, and to make others "feel like idiots for thinking in a way that's archaic".

Van Riemsdyk, along with fellow Flyers Scott Hartnell, Ian Laperrière, and Matt Carle, made a cameo appearance in the 2012 Judd Apatow comedy film This Is 40. In the film, two characters played by Megan Fox and Leslie Mann decide to unwind at a bar, where they find and flirt with members of the Flyers. Van Riemsdyk said, after the experience, that he and his teammates were nervous about filming, and that they "didn't want to do anything stupid or mess anything up or embarrass ourselves too much".

== Career statistics ==
=== Regular season and playoffs ===
			Regular season					Playoffs
Season	Team	League	GP	G	A	Pts	PIM	GP	G	A	Pts	PIM
2004–05	Christian Brothers Academy	HS-NJ	30	36	24	60	—	—	—	—	—	—
2005–06	U.S. NTDP U17	USDP	18	8	5	13	36	—	—	—	—	—
2005–06	U.S. NTDP U18	USDP	14	1	3	4	6	—	—	—	—	—
2005–06	U.S. NTDP U18	USHL	37	18	11	29	26	2	0	0	0	2
2006–07	U.S. NTDP U18	NAHL	12	13	12	25	37	—	—	—	—	—
2006–07	U.S. NTDP U18	USDP	30	20	18	38	44	—	—	—	—	—
2007–08	University of New Hampshire	HE	31	11	23	34	36	—	—	—	—	—
2008–09	University of New Hampshire	HE	36	17	23	40	47	—	—	—	—	—
2008–09	Philadelphia Phantoms	AHL	7	1	1	2	2	4	0	0	0	2
2009–10	Philadelphia Flyers	NHL	78	15	20	35	30	21	3	3	6	4
2010–11	Philadelphia Flyers	NHL	75	21	19	40	35	11	7	0	7	4
2011–12	Philadelphia Flyers	NHL	43	11	13	24	24	7	1	1	2	4
2012–13	Toronto Maple Leafs	NHL	48	18	14	32	26	7	2	5	7	4
2013–14	Toronto Maple Leafs	NHL	80	30	31	61	50	—	—	—	—	—
2014–15	Toronto Maple Leafs	NHL	82	27	29	56	43	—	—	—	—	—
2015–16	Toronto Maple Leafs	NHL	40	14	15	29	6	—	—	—	—	—
2016–17	Toronto Maple Leafs	NHL	82	29	33	62	37	6	2	1	3	0
2017–18	Toronto Maple Leafs	NHL	81	36	18	54	30	7	3	1	4	4
2018–19	Philadelphia Flyers	NHL	66	27	21	48	18	—	—	—	—	—
2019–20	Philadelphia Flyers	NHL	66	19	21	40	8	12	2	0	2	2
2020–21	Philadelphia Flyers	NHL	56	17	26	43	14	—	—	—	—	—
2021–22	Philadelphia Flyers	NHL	82	24	14	38	25	—	—	—	—	—
2022–23	Philadelphia Flyers	NHL	61	12	17	29	28	—	—	—	—	—
2023–24	Boston Bruins	NHL	71	11	27	38	20	11	1	4	5	0
2024–25	Columbus Blue Jackets	NHL	71	16	20	36	23	—	—	—	—	—
2025–26	Detroit Red Wings	NHL	72	15	16	31	14	—	—	—	—	—
NHL totals			1,154	342	354	696	431	82	21	15	36	22

=== International ===
Year	Team	Event	Result	GP	G	A	Pts	PIM
2006	United States	U17	2nd place, silver medalist(s)	6	5	4	9	4
2006	United States	WJC18	1st place, gold medalist(s)	6	0	1	1	2
2007	United States	WJC	3rd place, bronze medalist(s)	7	1	0	1	2
2007	United States	WJC18	2nd place, silver medalist(s)	7	5	7	12	4
2008	United States	WJC	4th	6	5	6	11	2
2009	United States	WJC	5th	6	6	4	10	4
2011	United States	WC	8th	2	1	0	1	2
2014	United States	OG	4th	6	1	6	7	2
2016	United States	WCH	7th	3	0	1	1	0
2019	United States	WC	7th	8	2	3	5	0
Junior totals				38	22	22	44	18
Senior totals				19	4	10	14	4

== Honors and awards ==
=== Honors ===
The 2016–17 season was the 100th in Toronto Maple Leafs history, and the franchise opened their centennial anniversary celebrations by compiling a list of the 100 greatest players in franchise history. A 30-person list committee as well as a fan vote ranked Van Riemsdyk No. 100.

=== Awards ===
Award	Year	Ref
College
Hockey East All-Rookie Team	2007–08	
Hockey East Second All-Star Team	2008–09	
International
World U18 All-Star Team	2007	
World U18 Top Forward	2007	
World U18 Most Valuable Player	2007	
WJC All-Star Team	2008	

=== Records ===
- Fastest goal to start a period, NHL history: 4 seconds (tied with Claude Provost and Denis Savard).

Awards and achievements
Preceded by Claude Giroux	Philadelphia Flyers' first-round draft pick 2007	Succeeded by Luca Sbisa
