= Peter Boyle (disambiguation) =

Peter Boyle (1935–2006) was an American actor.

Peter Boyle may also refer to:

== Sport ==
- Peter Boyle (footballer, born 1876) (1876–1939), Irish footballer
- Peter Boyle (footballer, born 1951) (1951–2013), Scottish-born Australian footballer
- Peter Boyle (Gaelic footballer), Gaelic football goalkeeper for Donegal

== Others ==
- Peter Boyle (epidemiologist) (1951–2022), Scottish epidemiologist
- Peter Boyle (film editor) (born 1946), English film editor
- Peter Boyle (poet) (born 1951), Australian poet
- Peter Boyle, Irish crewman aboard the SS Petosky and victim of the SS Eastland disaster (1915)
