= Governor Boyle =

Governor Boyle may refer to:

- David Boyle, 7th Earl of Glasgow (1833–1915), 12th Governor of New Zealand from 1892 to 1897
- Cavendish Boyle (1849–1916), Acting Governor of British Guiana from 1895 to 1896, Colonial Governor of Newfoundland from 1901 to 1904, and Governor of Mauritius from 1904 to 1911
