= James Boyle (diplomat) =

American diplomat

James Boyle (c. 1854 – June 12, 1939) was an American diplomat, private secretary to Ohio governor and U.S. president William McKinley, and an author. He served as a U.S. consul in Liverpool, England. He began his career as a stenographer, reporter, and editor at newspapers.

He said McKinley blamed Theodore Roosevelt for forcing McKinley into war with Spain.

He wrote about Liverpool's activity as a port and issues such as dredging. He also documented a cotton cargo fire and complaints about how bales of cotton were covered shipments from the U.S. He also wrote a report on the timber trade to Liverpool.

He had five sons and a daughter.

== Writings ==
- "What is Socialism?; An Exposition and Criticism" The Skaespeare Press New York City 1912
- Life of William McKinley, President of the United States, co-author with Robert Porter
- "The Initiative And Referendum : Its Folly, Fallacies, and Failure", A H Smythe, Columbus, Ohio (1912)
