= John Garrald =

John Garrald was Dean of Cork from 1628 until his death at Bristol in 1641.

Garrald was educated at Trinity College, Dublin. Garrald was Treasurer of Cashel from 1625 to 1634; and Prebenary of Cloyne from 1634 to 1635.
