= Hard (surname) =

Hard is a surname. Notable people with the surname include:

- Darlene Hard (1936–2021), American tennis player
- James Hard, American Civil War soldier
- Leif Hård (born 1944), Swedish politician
- Miron Elisha Hard (1849-1914), American educator and amateur mycologist
- Peggy Hård, Swedish clerk
