= Charles Boyle =

Charles Boyle may refer to:

- Charles Boyle, 3rd Viscount Dungarvan (1639–1694), British politician
- Charles Boyle, 2nd Earl of Burlington (died 1704), British politician
- Charles Boyle, 4th Earl of Orrery (1674–1731), author, soldier and statesman; namesake of the orrery
- Charles Boyle, 2nd Viscount Blesington (died 1732), Irish peer and member of the House of Lords
- Charles Boyle, Viscount Dungarvan (1729–1759), Irish member of parliament
- Charles Boyle (1734–1758), member of parliament for Lismore (Parliament of Ireland constituency)
- Charles Boyle (1774–1800), member of parliament for Charleville (Parliament of Ireland constituency)
- Charles Boyle, 10th Earl of Cork (1861–1925), Irish soldier and peer
- Charles Boyle (poet) (born 1951), British poet
- Charles A. Boyle (1907–1959), U.S. representative from Illinois
- Sir Charles Cavendish Boyle (1849–1916), British colonial administrator
- Charles Edmund Boyle (1836–1888), U.S. representative from Pennsylvania
- Charles J. Boyle (1877–1947), American football player and coach
- Charles P. Boyle (1892–1968), American cinematographer
- Charles Boyle (Brooklyn Nine-Nine), fictional character from American police television sitcom Brooklyn Nine-Nine
- Charles Boyle (horse trainer), (1838–1919) Canadian Hall of Fame horse trainer
- Charles Vesey Boyle (1915–2007), Irish rugby union player

== See also ==
- Charles Boyles (1756–1816), English vice-admiral of the Royal Navy
- Charles Boyle Roberts (1842–1899), U.S. congressman from Maine
