= Richard Boyle (archbishop of Tuam) =

English bishop

Richard Boyle (c. 1574–1645) was an English bishop who became Archbishop of Tuam in the Church of Ireland. He was the second son of Michael Boyle (died 2 February 1597), merchant in London, and his wife Jane (baptised 17 January 1548), daughter and co-heiress of William Peacock. His younger brother was Michael Boyle, bishop of Waterford.

== Biography ==
Richard Boyle was born around 1574. In 1590, he entered Corpus Christi College, Cambridge but is recorded to have migrated to St John's College, Cambridge. He graduated with a BA in 1595 which led to an MA three years later, and was incorporated MA at Oxford on 16 July 1601. He held the vicarage of Finedon in Northamptonshire before embarking on a Church of Ireland ecclesiastical career.

He became warden of Youghal on 24 February 1603, dean of Waterford on 10 May 1603 (until 1620), and dean of Tuam in May 1604, Archdeacon of Limerick on 8 May 1605, and bishop of Cork, Cloyne, and Ross on 22 August 1620, these three preferments being obtained through the interest of his cousin, Richard Boyle, 1st Earl of Cork, with whom he later quarrelled. He was advanced to the see of Tuam on 30 May 1638. On the outbreak of the Irish Rebellion of 1641, he retired with Dr. John Maxwell, bishop of Killala, and others, to Galway for protection, where, when the town rose in arms against the garrison, his life was preserved through the influence of Ulick Burke, Earl of Clanricarde. He died at Cork on 19 March 1645, and was buried in the Cathedral of St. Finbar. He is said to have repaired more churches and consecrated more new ones than any other bishop of his time.

== Family ==
He married Martha, daughter of Rice Wight (died 31 October 1602) of Braboeuf Manor at Artington in Surrey, and his wife Elizabeth, daughter of Henry Needler of Holylands at Horley, Surrey. Sources differ over their children, a provisional list being:

- Reverend Michael, Archbishop of Armagh and father of the 1st Viscount Blessington.
- Richard, a Royalist army officer executed after the Siege of Drogheda in 1649.
- Elizabeth, married Sir Robert Travers.
- Alice, married Henry Delaune, who died at the Battle of Lostwithiel in 1644.
- Anne, married to John Davant, with whom she drowned in 1641.
- Jane, married to Sir William Hull, Vice-Admiral of Munster, who lived at Leamcon near Schull in County Cork.
- Catherine I, died in infancy.
- Catherine II, married to John FitzGerald, Dean of Cork, who died at Bristol in 1641.
- Dorothy, married first to Grenville Halse (sources also give his first name as Arthur or Hewett) who died in 1645, secondly to Henry Turner of Bandon, County Cork, and thirdly to Thomas Roberts, Chancellor of Cork.
- Martha, married first to Lt-Colonel Osbaldeston who was killed at the Siege of Gloucester in 1643, secondly to Lt-Colonel John Nelson and thirdly to Sir Matthew Deane, 1st Baronet of Dromore.
- Bridget, married John Jephson, son of John Jephson and brother of William Jephson.
