= Justice Boyle =

Justice Boyle may refer to:

- Larry Monroe Boyle (1943–2017), associate justice of the Idaho Supreme Court
- Patricia Boyle (1937–2014), associate justice of the Michigan Supreme Court
