= Mary Boyle =

Mary Boyle may refer to:

- Mary Boyle (psychologist), British clinical psychologist
- Mary Boyle, Countess of Cork and Orrery (1746–1840), British literary hostess
- Mary O. Boyle (born 1941), American politician of the Ohio Democratic party
- Mary Boyle O'Reilly (1873–1939), American social reformer, clubwoman, and journalist
- Mary Boyle (born 1970), six-year-old girl who went missing in County Donegal, Ireland in 1977
