= Mark Boyle =

Mark Boyle may refer to:

- Mark Boyle (artist) (1934–2005), Scottish artist
- Mark Boyle (Moneyless Man) (born 1979), Irish activist and writer
- Mark Boyle (snooker player) (born 1981), Scottish snooker player
