= Robert William Boyle =

Canadian-British physicist

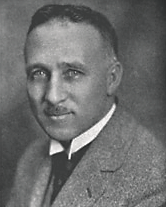
- Robert William Boyle
- Born: 2 October 1883; Carbonear, Newfoundland
- Died: April 18, 1955 (aged 71); London, England
- Education: McGill University
- Known for: ASDIC (Sonar)
- Awards: Royal Society of Canada; Flavelle Medal (1940)
- Scientific career
- Fields: Physics, Radioactivity, Ultrasonics
- Workplaces: University of Manchester; University of Alberta; Board of Invention and Research; National Research Council of Canada
- Doctoral advisor: Ernest Rutherford

Robert William Boyle (October 2, 1883 – April 18, 1955) was a physicist and one of the most important early pioneers in the development of sonar.

Boyle was born in 1883 at Carbonear in the Dominion of Newfoundland. Boyle left Newfoundland for Montreal, Quebec in Canada where he trained at McGill University under Nobel Prize winner Sir Ernest Rutherford, in the then fledgling field of radioactivity. He earned McGill's first Doctor of Philosophy in physics in 1909. He then moved to England to continue his work by following Rutherford to the University of Manchester.

In 1912 he returned to Canada at the request of Henry Marshall Tory to become head of the physics department at the University of Alberta, and shifted his research to ultrasonics.

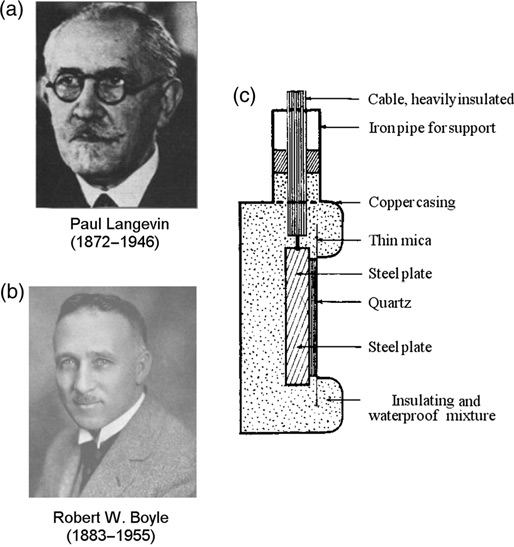
Pioneers in the development and application of piezoelectric transducers for the goal of submarine detection (a) Paul Langevin, (b) Robert William Boyle, (c) Cross-sectional view of a form of quartz transducer designed by Boyle in 1917, as recorded in the BIR (Board of Invention and Research) document 38164/17

During the First World War Boyle volunteered his expertise to the British Admiralty and, with the help of his old professor Ernest Rutherford, he joined the Board of Inventions and Research and worked with British physicist Albert Beaumont Wood, a fellow student of Rutherford's.

Before 1917 the scientific teams from the Allied countries worked separately, however, after joining forces with French researchers, Boyle produced a working prototype of what the British called "ASDIC" (the first sonar).

Early versions of the technology were being installed on Royal Navy war ships just as the war came to an end.

In 1919 Boyle returned to Alberta and shortly thereafter became dean of the Faculty of Applied Science, a position he held until 1929. That year he joined the National Research Council of Canada as the director of physics, where he supervised research into radar during the Second World War. Boyle also recruited engineering professor John Hamilton Parkin from the University of Toronto to head aeronautical research at NRC.

He continued to work at the National Research Council until his retirement in 1948, when he moved back to England.

He was elected to the Royal Society of Canada in 1921 and awarded the Flavelle Medal in 1940. He died in London, England, aged 71.
