= James Boyle (Fianna Fáil politician) =

Irish politician (died 1944)

Senator
- In office 12 December 1934 – 19 May 1936

Personal details
- Born: County Offaly, Ireland
- Died: 1944
- Political party: Fianna Fáil

James Joseph Boyle (died 1944) was an Irish teacher and Fianna Fáil politician.

A national school teacher from Horseleap, on the border between Westmeath and Offaly, Boyle was a member of Offaly County Council and had been an active Republican since 1915. He was elected to the Seanad at the elections in December 1934, the 13th of 23 Senators elected. A member of the national executive of Fianna Fáil, he died at his home on 19 October 1944.
