= Steve Boyle (boxer) =

Scottish boxer

Personal information
- Nationality: British
- Born: 28 November 1962 (age 63) Glasgow, Scotland
- Height: 5 ft 7 in (170 cm)
- Weight: Lightweight

Boxing career
- Stance: Southpaw

Boxing record
- Total fights: 33
- Wins: 25
- Win by KO: 17
- Losses: 6
- Draws: 2

Steve Boyle (born 28 November 1962) is a Scottish former boxer who was British lightweight champion between 1988 and 1990.

== Career ==
Steve Boyle was born in Glasgow and made his professional début in May 1983. In June 1985 he beat Dave Savage to win the BBBofC Scottish Area lightweight title. After winning his next three fights he challenged Tony Willis in May 1986 for the British title, losing via a ninth round stoppage. In March 1987 he beat Mike Durvan on points in a British title eliminator, setting up a challenge in February 1988 for Alex Dickson's title; Boyle knocked Dickson out in the second round to become British champion. He made a successful defence in November against Joey Jacobs.

In January 1989 he beat Pedro Armando Gutierrez to take the WBC International lightweight title, and in November 1989 met Antonio Renzo for the vacant European title, losing after retiring in the seventh round. In December 1989 he was ordered to defend his British title against Peter Till but the fight never happened and Boyle relinquished his title in 1990. He also moved from Tommy Gilmour to be managed by London-based Frank Warren.

In May 1992 he challenged again for the British title, with the Commonwealth title also at stake, but was stopped in the seventh round by Carl Crook. His final fight came a year later, a points win over journeyman Mark Antony.
