= Derek Paul Jack Boyle =

American photographer

- Education: Emerson College; Rhode Island School of Design (MFA)
- Occupation: Visual artist
- Website: derekpauljackboyle.com

Derek Paul Jack Boyle is an American visual artist whose work frequently involves the anthropomorphism of everyday objects and absurdist interventions.

Boyle's work has been featured in The New York Times, VICE Creators Project, Elephant magazine, WYNC/NPR's Radiolab, and exhibited at Reed College RAW Festival and Brown University Pixilerations Festival. Boyle received his undergraduate degree from Emerson College in Boston and his MFA in Digital + Media from the Rhode Island School of Design. Boyle lives and works in Los Angeles and is one half of Meatwreck, a photographic and video collaboration with artist Mitra Saboury.
