= James Boyle (broadcasting) =

British broadcaster

James Boyle (born 29 March 1946) was Chairman of the National Library of Scotland until 2016, Chairman of the British Council in Scotland and was formerly Chairman of the Scottish Arts Council, Chairman of the Scottish Government's Cultural Commission, Controller of BBC Radio 4, Head of BBC Radio Scotland and co-founder of the UNESCO World City of Literature and World City of Music Programs. He has also served on the board of Napier University and as a UK Civil Service Commissioner. He was educated at the University of Strathclyde (BA, 1969) and the University of East Anglia (MA, 1971).

In March 2016 Boyle was elected a Fellow of the Royal Society of Edinburgh, Scotland's National Academy for science and letters.

== BBC Executive ==
Boyle spent more than 25 years at the BBC, including four years as head of BBC Radio Scotland and four years as controller of BBC Radio 4. At Radio Scotland he oversaw sweeping changes to the station's programming line-up. Some of those changes generated a mixed mailbag from listeners. However, after the revamp the station was named UK Radio Station of the Year at the broadcasting industry's Sony Awards.

In 1996 Boyle was appointed to head BBC Radio Four, perhaps the UK's premier radio station. Boyle overhauled almost the entire schedule. Critics outside and inside the BBC questioned the number of changes, and their timing, and he was nicknamed "MacBirt", in reference to his being a Scottish version of BBC Director-General Lord Birt. Nonetheless, many of the new shows received critical acclaim, including John Peel's Home Truths, arts programme Front Row, and current affairs show Broadcasting House. The new programmes subsequently won a record 6 gold Sony awards in one year and eight other silver and bronze awards. Boyle announced his departure from Radio Four in 2000, leading The Observer newspaper to run the headline: “He Came, He Conquered, He Quit.” Just after Boyle left, Radio Four, like Radio Scotland before it, was named Radio Station of the Year at the Sony Awards.

== The Scottish Arts Council ==
After leaving the BBC, Boyle served as Chairman of the Scottish Arts Council (SAC), the agency that has control over the Scottish government's arts budget. Arts Council Chief Executive Tessa Jackson left shortly afterwards. He was then appointed Chair of the Cultural Commission, a body set up to review Scottish arts and cultural funding and provide recommendations for the next quarter century. The centerpiece of the Cultural Commission's report – issued after a year of investigation and deliberations – was a recommendation that the government increase arts spending by £100 million (approximately $190 million), enshrine "cultural rights," and overhaul and simplify the arts bureaucracy (including, ironically, by getting rid of the SAC, which Boyle had just left).

Boyle had a public run-in with Scottish Culture Minister Patricia Ferguson when she announced her support for an Academy of Scotland just before the commission was set to unveil a similar policy. Boyle denounced Ferguson's "lack of integrity." After the Cultural Commission report was published, Ferguson was publicly accused of trying to bury it. Eventually, the Scottish government adopted a version of the report's main proposals, increasing arts spending by £20 million, restructuring the public arts agencies, and agreeing to implement cultural rights.

== National Library of Scotland ==
Boyle was appointed Chairman of the National Library of Scotland on 25 October 2012. NLS is one of the world's leading research libraries and one of Scotland's premier cultural institutions. The Edinburgh-based library's collections hold about 15 million printed items, 100,000 manuscripts, two million maps and 25,000 newspaper and magazine titles. The collection includes copies of the Gutenberg Bible, the letter which Charles Darwin submitted with the manuscript of Origin of Species and the First Folio of Shakespeare. NLS serves as the legal deposit library of Scotland, which under the Legal Deposit Libraries Act 2003 entitles the Library to request a free copy of every book published in the UK within one year of its publication.

== Public service and other appointments ==
Boyle’s career in public service includes many appointments. Until 2008, he served as a Commissioner on the UK's Civil Service Commission, the body tasked with appointing Britain's senior civil servants. Boyle was Chairman of the City of Literature Initiative, and spearheaded the effort that led to Edinburgh being selected by UNESCO as the inaugural City of Literature. He was also a co-founder of the UNESCO City of Music Program that led to Glasgow being selected as the first World City of Music.

Currently Boyle is a director of the London public relations company Franklin Rae and for eight years was a member of the board of governors (known as the Court) of Edinburgh's Napier University. In 2008 he was appointed Chairman of the British Council's Scottish National Committee. He has also held non-executive directorships on the boards of media company Wark Clements and Anareva, a boutique search consultancy.

In 2005, the University of Edinburgh awarded Boyle with the degree of Doctor honoris causa. Boyle previously received honorary doctorates from Napier University and the University of Aberdeen. He is also an honorary professor at the University of Stirling.

== Personal life ==
When at the BBC, Boyle wrote many scripts for radio and a number of TV plays for educational television. He collects first editions of twentieth century literature. Boyle and his wife Marie live in Edinburgh, Scotland. He has three sons, four grandsons and three grand-daughters.
