= Patrick Boyle (publisher) =

Patrick Boyle (1832 - 1 August 1901) was a printer and publisher in Toronto, Ontario, Canada.

Boyle was born in Newport, County Mayo, Ireland, in 1832. In 1844 he and his family emigrated to the United States, moving two years later to Toronto, Canada. From the early 1850s he worked as a printer at the Globe - then run by George Brown - and afterwards for the Catholic Citizen. He worked briefly at his trade in New York and New Orleans but had returned to Canada at the start of the American Civil War.

In January 1863 Boyle launched the Irish Canadian, a response to contact with the Irish nationalist paper, Phoenix, sectarianism in Toronto between Irish emigrants, and his personal fury at British colonialism in Ireland. The Irish Canadian was held to be a mouthpiece of the Hibernaian Benevolent Society of Canada, a working-class association of which Boyle was secretary. He agitated for Home Rule, the political advancement of Irish Catholics in Canada, as well as Irish rights in Canada and in Ireland. In 1892 it had the largest circulation of any Catholic newspaper in Ontario.

Despite his sympathies for the Fenian movement, Boyle, through his paper, opposed any Irish invasion of Canada. His failure to fully distance himself from the movement led to a break between him and Irish-Canadians headed by Thomas D'Arcy McGee, James George Moylan, and Archbishop John Joseph Lynch.

Jim O'Neill's Fenian invasion in 1866 led to further tensions, not improved by Boyle's assumption of the presidency of the Hibernians after the arrest of Michael Murphy. Boyle was arrested in April 1868 in the aftermath of the assassination of D'Arcy McGee, remaining in jail for three months with his brother-in-law and co-publisher, James E. Hynes. The failure of the Fenian cause led him in 1872 to align with John O'Donohoe and the cause of Reform. Yet his criticism of clerical interference in politics led to verbal blows with Archbishop Lynch, a withdrawal of support from the Liberals, and by 1878 backing of the Conservatives.

By 1887 Boyle had ceased backing the Conservatives in the aftermath of their 1886 'no popery' campaign. From then on he left religious questions alone, seeking purely political objectives. Nevertheless, 1888 saw further hostilities erupt between Boyle and Lynch, who died in May before a resolution of the matter.

Boyle died in Toronto in 1901, survived by his unmarried daughter, Harriet. A fund was set up for her by both friends and long-time rivals. Mark McGown summed him up as follows:

Boyle’s lifelong fight for Irish Catholic rights enhanced the political influence of his community and had a long-term impact on Catholics as their Irishness faded. An effective organ of ethno-religious and political opinion, his Irish Canadian not only provided strong foundations for contemporary Catholic journalism, but forced Canadian political parties to recognize the emergence of a Catholic presence in English Canada.

— Mark McGown
