= David Boyle (archaeologist) =

Canadian archaeologist and ethnologist (1842–1911)

- Born: 1 May 1842; Greenock, Scotland
- Died: 14 February 1911 (aged 68); Toronto, Ontario, Canada
- Occupations: blacksmith, teacher, archaeologist, musicologist, and historian

David Boyle (1 May 1842 – 14 February 1911) was a Canadian blacksmith, teacher, archaeologist, musicologist, and historian.

== Early life ==
Born in Greenock, Scotland, to John Boyle (1818 – 1882) and Ann Boyle (née Anderson; 1819 – 1863), Boyle arrived in Upper Canada, where most of his father’s family had already located, from Scotland in 1856 and apprenticed to a blacksmith. He would become a teacher in rural Ontario in 1865, a school principal in Elora from 1871 to 1881, and later a bookseller in Toronto. Boyle followed what were then "radical child-centered theories" of Johann Pestalozzi.

== Career ==
In 1884, Boyle became curator of the Canadian Institute Museum, a post he held until 1896, and was curator of the Ontario Provincial Museum 1886-1911. He cultivated a core of loyal collectors across southern and central Ontario who assisted him in archaeological digs and in collecting artifacts for the museums. These men included Andrew Frederick Hunter, George E. Laidlaw, J. Hugh Hammond, John Long, Dr Thomas W. Beeman, William Wintemberg and Frederick William Waugh. He was also the Secretary of the Ontario Historical Society after 1898, and became highly influential in the local historical societies that grew up in Ontario in the late nineteenth century. In 1898, Boyle also began to conduct ethnographic fieldwork at the Six Nations of the Grand River reserve near Brantford, after having met John Ojijatekha Brant-Sero through the Canadian Institute. He later met Dr. Peter E. Jones of the nearby Mississauga of the New Credit reserve who also assisted him in his fieldwork. An Ontario Historical Plaque was erected by the province to commemorate David Boyle's role in Ontario's heritage. His work served as the basis for archaeology as a serious scientific discipline in the province. Between 1887 and 1911, he published Annual Archaeological Reports for Ontario, Canada's first journal primarily dedicated to archaeology.

In 1908 he was the third recipient of the Cornplanter Medal.

== Personal life and death ==
Boyle was also a history buff and preservationist, as well as the author of a book of nonsense poetry for children.

He died in 1911 in Toronto from bronchitis. His papers are housed at the provincial Archives of Ontario, the University of Toronto Archives, and at the Royal Ontario Museum archives.

== Sources ==
- Killan, Gerald. "Boyle, David" in The Canadian Encyclopedia, Volume 1, p. 264. Edmonton: Hurtig Publishers, 1988.
- Killan, Gerald. David Boyle: From Artisan to Archaeologist. Toronto: UTP, 1983.
- Killan, Gerald. Preserving Ontario's Heritage: a History of the Ontario Historical Society. Ottawa: Love, 1976.
- Hamilton, Michelle A. Collections and Objections: Aboriginal Material Culture in Southern Ontario, 1791-1914. Kingston: McGill-Queen's University Press, 2010.
