= Boyle =

Boyle may refer to:

== Places ==
=== United States ===
- Boyle, Kansas, an unincorporated community
- Boyle, Mississippi, a town
- Boyle County, Kentucky
- Boyle Heights, Los Angeles, a neighborhood

=== Elsewhere ===
- Boyle (crater), a lunar crater
- 11967 Boyle, an asteroid
- Boyle, Alberta, Canada, a village
- Boyle, County Roscommon, Ireland, a town

== Structures ==
- Boyle Abbey, County Roscommon, Ireland, a ruined Cistercian abbey
- Boyle Cross, in Somerset, England, a market cross

== Other uses ==
- Boyle (surname)
- Boyle's law, in physics, one of the gas laws; named after Irish natural philosopher Robert Boyle
- Boyle's machine, used in the administration of general anaesthesia to patients
- Clan Boyle, a Scottish clan
- USS Boyle (DD-600), U.S. Navy destroyer

== See also ==
- Boyle River (disambiguation)
- Boil (disambiguation)
