= Vince Dunn =

Canadian ice hockey player (born 1996)

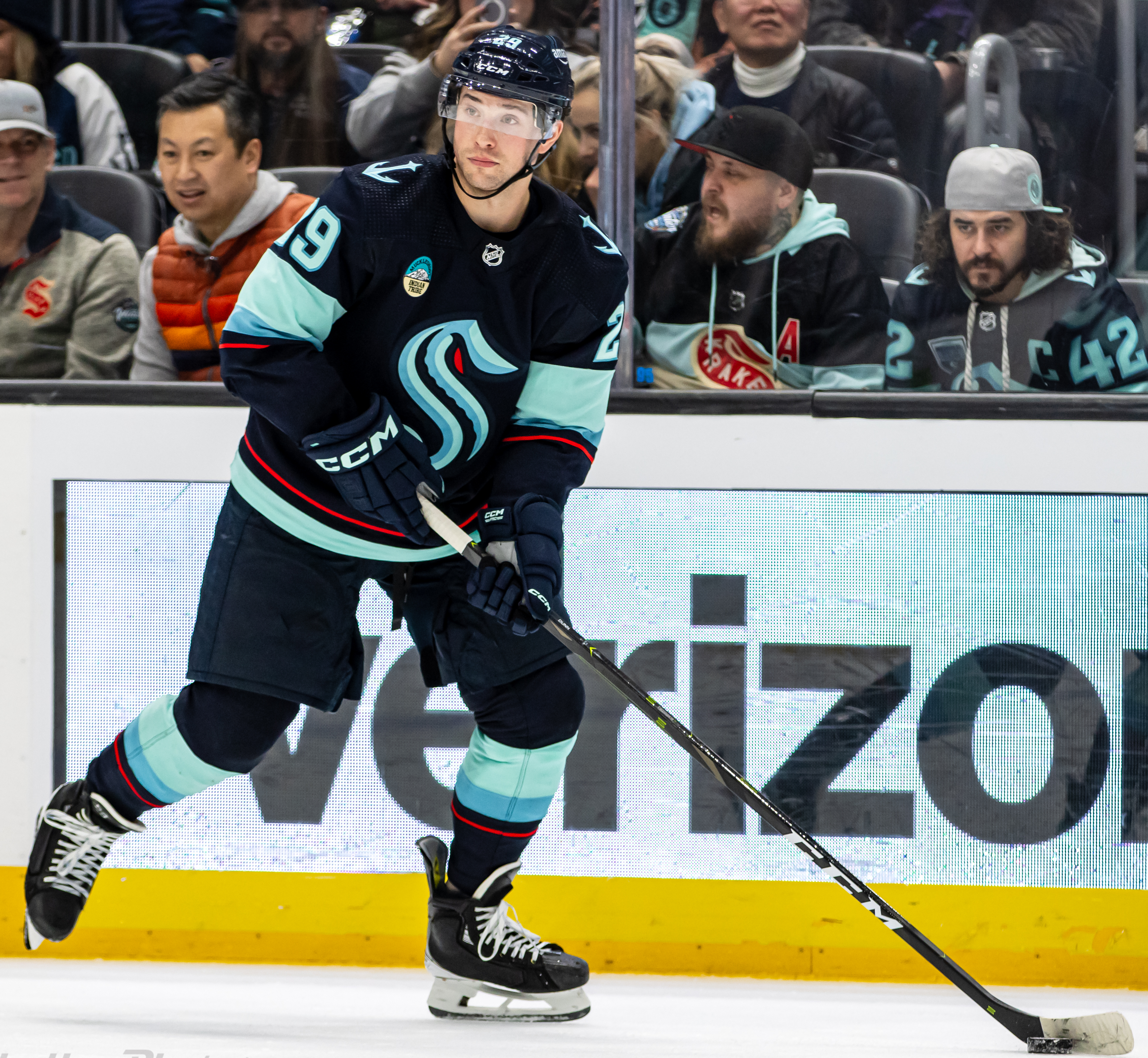
- Dunn with the Seattle Kraken in 2024
- Born: October 29, 1996 (age 30) Peterborough, Ontario, Canada
- Height: 6 ft 0 in (183 cm)
- Weight: 200 lb (91 kg; 14 st 4 lb)
- Position: Defence
- Shoots: Left
- NHL team Former teams: Seattle Kraken; St. Louis Blues
- NHL draft: 56th overall, 2015; St. Louis Blues
- Playing career: 2016–present

Vince Dunn (born October 29, 1996) is a Canadian professional ice hockey player who is a defenceman and alternate captain for the Seattle Kraken of the National Hockey League (NHL).

Born in Peterborough, Ontario, Dunn began his minor hockey career with the Central Ontario Wolves and hometown club, the Peterborough Petes. He was eventually drafted by the Niagara IceDogs in the 2012 Ontario Hockey League (OHL) Priority Selection Draft and spent three seasons with the team. During his tenure in the OHL, Dunn began to gain attention from scouts and earned the IceDogs Top Defenceman of the Year Award in two consecutive seasons. He was eventually drafted by the St. Louis Blues in the second round, 56th overall, in the 2015 NHL entry draft and later won the Stanley Cup as a member of the team in 2019.

== Early life ==
Dunn was born on October 29, 1996, in Peterborough, Ontario, Canada, to nurse Tracy and an unnamed Italian father who divorced when Dunn was three years old. His mother later remarried police officer John. Vince was adopted by his stepfather and uses his last name, Dunn.

His step brother Nolan Dunn also played hockey but is now retired. Growing up, he cheered for the hometown Toronto Maple Leafs, specifically Carl Gunnarsson and Alexander Steen. In honour of Dunn's grandfather who was important in his development as a player, the family started a Canadian Tire Jumpstart memorial fund in his name.

== Playing career ==
=== Youth ===
Dunn grew up in Lindsay, Ontario and began his minor hockey career with the Central Ontario Wolves and hometown club, the Peterborough Petes at the bantam and midget level. Dunn was unhappy while playing for the Wolves, although his coach refused to release him to another team. As a result, he and his mother Tracy moved an hour away to allow him to play with the Petes. While with the Petes, Dunn was invited to compete on the North American select team at the 2012 Lekov Cup tournament in the Czech Republic.

As a result of his early success, Dunn was invited to the 2011 Ontario Minor Hockey Association AAA Showcase in Barrie prior to the 2012 Ontario Hockey League (OHL) Priority Selection Draft. He was eventually drafted 109th overall by the Niagara IceDogs in the 2012 OHL Priority Selection Draft but chose to play amateur Junior B hockey with the Thorold Blackhawks of the Greater Ontario Junior Hockey League before joining the IceDogs. Upon reflection on his decision, Dunn stated, "I needed to learn a few more things to move up to the next level... I thought Thorold would be the best place for me." During his season with the Blackhawks, Dunn collected 28 points in 48 games.

=== Major junior ===
The following year, Dunn made the jump to major junior and began his rookie campaign with the Niagara IceDogs during their 2013–14 season. In his first 26 games with the team, Dunn recorded 10 points which earned praise from coach/general manager Marty Williamson as an "above average player." At the conclusion of his rookie campaign, Dunn led all first year defencemen in the league in scoring with 33 points in 63 games. He also received the Ice Dogs Rookie of the Year Award.

Dunn continued to improve in his second season with Niagara, totaling 56 points in 68 games to clinch the team's Top Defenceman of the Year Award. He was invited to the 2015 BMO Top Prospects Game where he remained pointless in the 6–0 loss to Team Orr. He also earned a final ranking of 32nd overall amongst North American Skaters by the NHL Central Scouting Bureau prior to the 2015 NHL entry draft. When asked about his rising status, Dunn stated "Obviously, I want to be selected in the first round ... I believe I’m a first-round pick but if it doesn’t end up that way, I’m going to work just as hard no matter where I am picked and whoever picks me." Dunn and the IceDogs qualified for the 2015 OHL playoffs, where he scored four goals in game one against the Ottawa 67s to help the team win the series 4–2. He began the second round against the Oshawa Generals leading all defencemen before being suspended two games for slew footing Mitchell Vande Sompel. Although he returned to the lineup for game four, a knee injury would keep him out for the remainder of the series. Dunn was eventually selected by the St. Louis Blues 56th overall in the second round of the draft and signed a three-year, entry-level contract with the team on September 25, 2015.

On June 24, 2015, Dunn was one of seven Niagara IceDogs players and prospects invited to participate in Hockey Canada Summer Showcase. However, Dunn left the camp early due to a pre-existing knee injury. Dunn attended the St. Louis Blues 2015 Development Camp before returning for his final season of major junior hockey with the IceDogs. Once again, he led the IceDogs to the OHL playoffs and was selected as the IceDogs Top Defenceman of the Year for the second consecutive season. During the IceDogs Eastern Conference Finals series win over the Kingston Frontenacs, Dunn suffered a knee injury and sat out for the start of the Eastern Conference championships. He suffered the injury during game three of the series and was listed as day-to-day with no surgery required. Dunn eventually returned to the lineup and led the IceDogs to the Eastern Conference championship over the London Knights.

=== Professional ===
==== St. Louis Blues ====
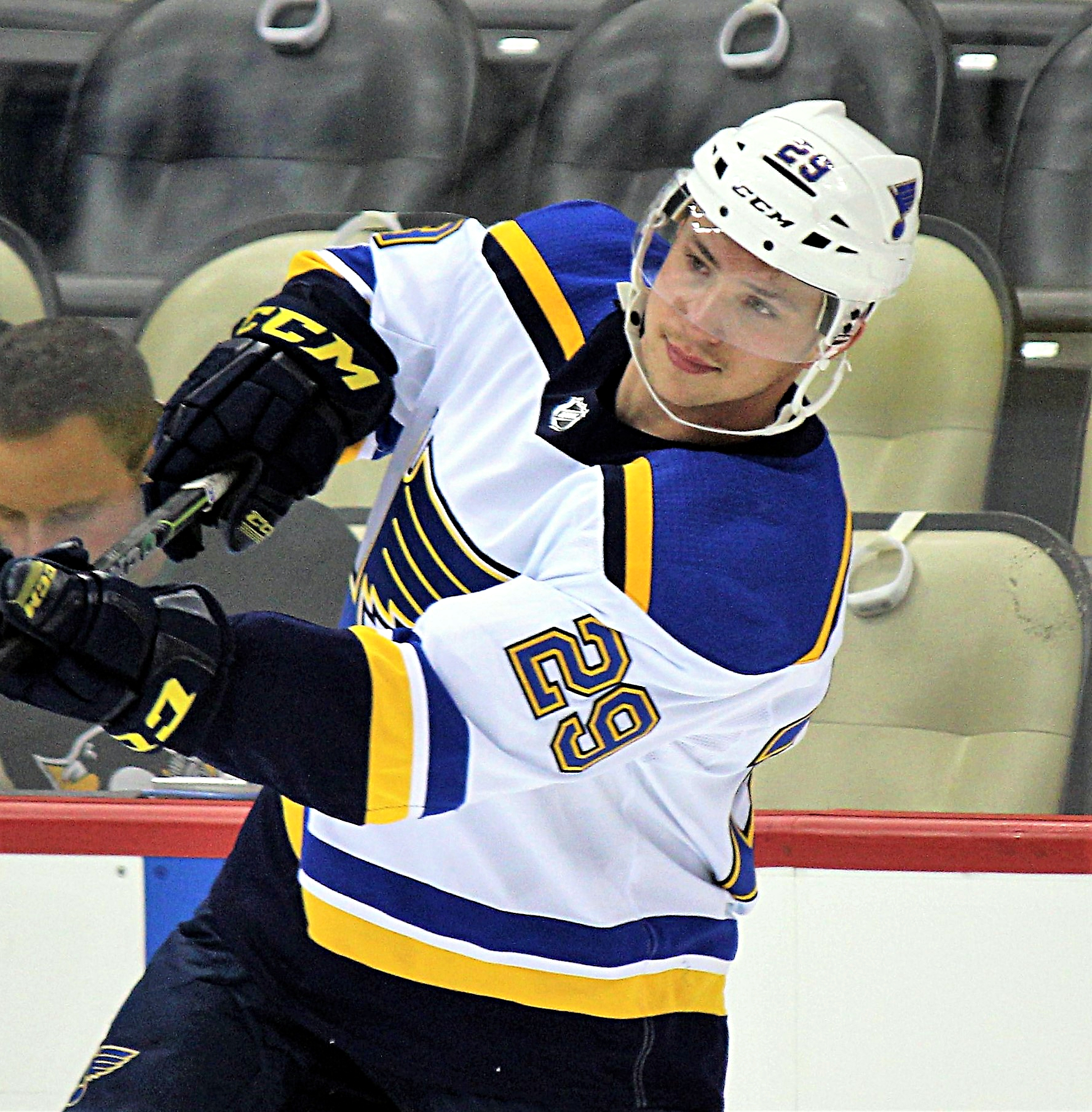
Dunn during a game against the Pittsburgh Penguins in October 2017

At the conclusion of his major junior career, Dunn opted to begin his professional career and was assigned by the Blues to their American Hockey League (AHL) affiliate, the Chicago Wolves, for the 2016–17 season. He recorded his first career professional goal in a 4–2 loss against the Grand Rapids Griffins on October 15, 2016. At the age of 20, Dunn was the youngest player on the roster and he compiled 45 points in 72 games to lead the Wolves defence in scoring.

Approaching his second season as a professional, Dunn made the St. Louis Blues' opening night roster for the 2017–18 season. He made his NHL debut with the Blues against the defending Stanley Cup champions, the Pittsburgh Penguins, while playing a third pairing role in a 5–4 overtime win on October 4, 2017. Eight days later, Dunn registered his first career NHL goal at 18:51 in the third period during a 5–2 loss to the Florida Panthers. He consistently played on the team's third pairing with Robert Bortuzzo while averaging 16:14 of ice time and playing on the second power play unit. On March 18, 2018, Dunn became the first Blues rookie to record four points in one game since Rik Wilson during a 5–4 overtime win against the Chicago Blackhawks. At the conclusion of his sophomore season, Dunn was named to Canada's senior team to compete at the 2018 IIHF World Championship, but was replaced by Josh Bailey due to an injury.

Dunn continued his success in the National Hockey League by once again making the Blues lineup to begin the 2018–19 season. During a game against the Edmonton Oilers on December 18, Dunn cross-checked Oilers forward Jujhar Khaira, earning him a minor penalty and $1,942.20 fine. In March 2019, Dunn recorded a new career-high in points with 27 and joined Alex Pietrangelo and Colton Parayko as the first three Blues defencemen to reach 10 goals in the same season. He stayed with the team the entire season and helped them qualify for the 2019 Stanley Cup playoffs. During game three of the Western Conference finals, Dunn took a puck to the face which he broke his jaw and required multiple surgeries to fix. He returned to the Blues' lineup for game four of the 2019 Stanley Cup Final and recorded a point in the 4–2 win over the Boston Bruins. On June 12, 2019, Dunn won the 2019 Stanley Cup Finals with the Blues, St. Louis' first Stanley Cup in their 52-year franchise history. Upon winning the Cup, Dunn said "For me at such a young age, it's very special ... You kind of take things for granted when you're younger, but now you really take it in." During his Day with the Cup, Dunn returned to his hometown of Lindsay, Ontario and Kawartha Lakes.

Although he returned to the lineup, Dunn required surgeries during the offseason and replaced five teeth. He was cleared to play during the Blues' preseason games and chose to forgo a full face shield. When asked about his decision, Dunn said "I tried that (full shield) ... I didn’t like it. It’s a distraction more than anything. I’d rather just take another puck to the face." Upon returning to the Blues for the 2019–20 NHL regular season, Dunn was reunited with his former defensive partner Robert Bortuzzo. During the NHL's pause in play due to the COVID-19 pandemic, Dunn competed in a league-wide Fortnite tournament for charity with teammates Robert Thomas and Jordan Kyrou. Together, they finished in first place and donated $50,000 to the St. Louis Children's Hospital, $25,000 to the St. Louis Area Foodbank, and $25,000 to muscular dystrophy research. Once the NHL returned to play, Dunn and the Blues lost to the Vancouver Canucks in the Western Conference First Round of the 2020 Stanley Cup playoffs.

Following their playoff loss, Dunn signed a one-year, $1.875 million contract to remain with the Blues on December 31, 2020.

==== Seattle Kraken ====
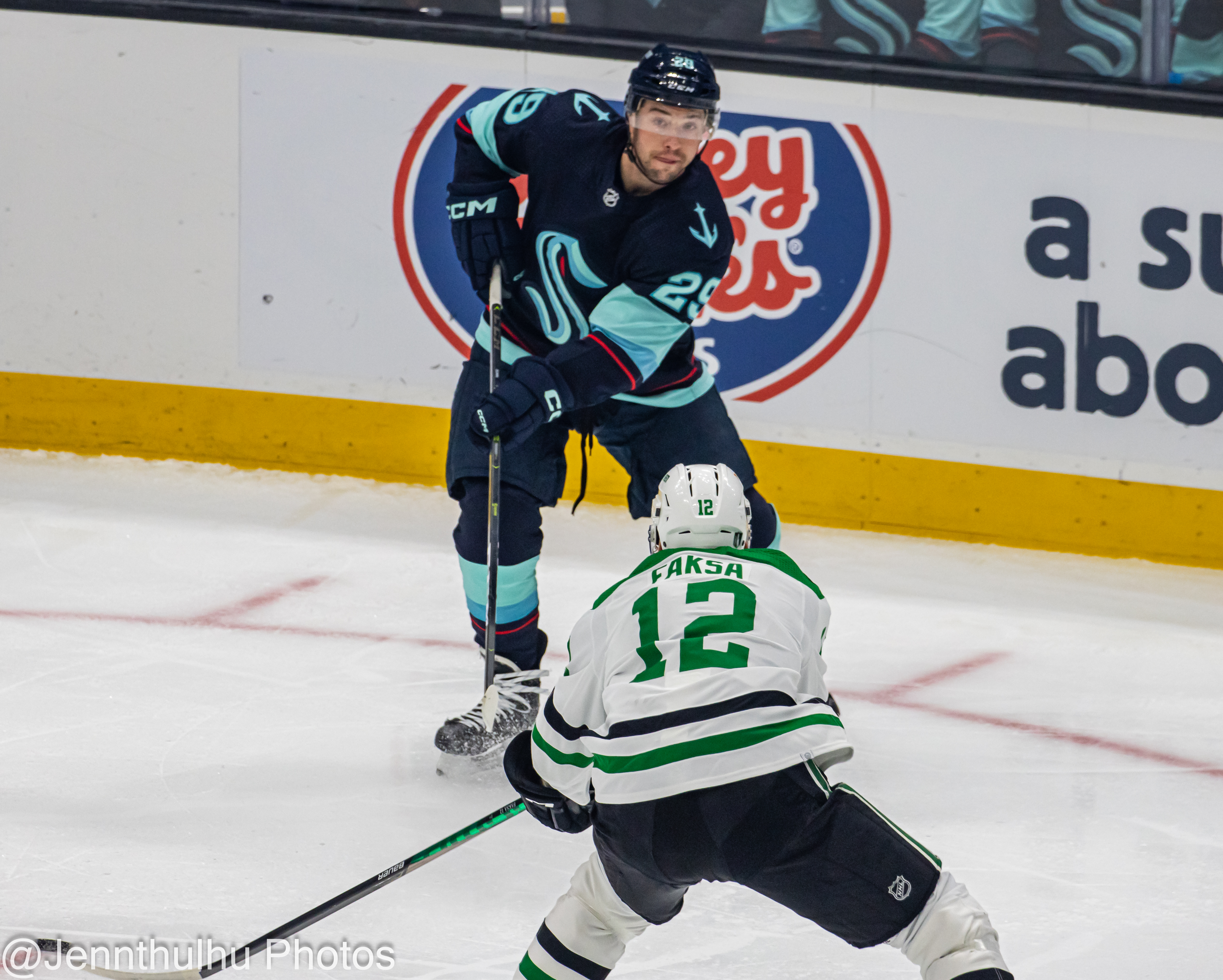
Dunn and Radek Faksa of the Dallas Stars during Round 2 game six of the 2023 Stanley Cup playoffs.

After five seasons within the Blues organization, Dunn's tenure ended on July 21, 2021, after he was selected at the 2021 NHL expansion draft by the Seattle Kraken. Dunn soon signed a two-year, $8 million contract by the Kraken on August 6 to avoid going to arbitration. He then participated in the Kraken's inaugural training camp and played alongside captain Mark Giordano. Once the season began, Dunn suffered an undisclosed injury and missed two consecutive games. Upon returning to the lineup, he scored the first goal in the history of Climate Pledge Arena for the Kraken in the first period of a 4–2 loss to the Vancouver Canucks. As the Kraken continued to lose games through November, head coach Dave Hakstol placed Dunn on a pairing with Adam Larsson. As a precaution during the COVID-19 pandemic, the NHL paused play for over a week as teams recovered. Once the Kraken returned to the ice, Dunn was placed on the NHLs COVID protocol list.

Dunn had a breakout season in 2022–23, setting career highs with 14 goals and 64 points, continuing his successful partnership with Larsson on the Kraken's top pair. The Kraken also improved dramatically from the previous season, making the playoffs for the first time and defeating the Colorado Avalanche, the reigning Stanley Cup champions, in seven games before falling to the Dallas Stars in the next round.

On July 21, 2023, Dunn and the Kraken avoided arbitration for a second time with a four-year, $29.4 million contract extension.

== Player profile ==
Dunn considers himself a puck-moving defencemen, similar to that of Ryan Ellis of the Philadelphia Flyers. He said, "I know I'm not one of the biggest defensemen out there, but if my stick is really good in one-on-one battles and I keep guys on the outside as much as possible, I'll be able to succeed in the defensive end. Being one of the smaller defenseman out there my stick skills are essential. Since last year, I have been working on my defensive skills especially."

== Career statistics ==
			Regular season					Playoffs
Season	Team	League	GP	G	A	Pts	PIM	GP	G	A	Pts	PIM
2012–13	Thorold Blackhawks	GOJHL	48	5	23	28	35	13	3	5	8	10
2013–14	Niagara IceDogs	OHL	63	5	28	33	45	7	0	1	1	2
2014–15	Niagara IceDogs	OHL	68	18	38	56	59	8	6	4	10	22
2015–16	Niagara IceDogs	OHL	52	12	31	43	52	12	5	7	12	10
2016–17	Chicago Wolves	AHL	72	13	32	45	71	10	1	5	6	20
2017–18	St. Louis Blues	NHL	75	5	19	24	20	—	—	—	—	—
2017–18	Chicago Wolves	AHL	2	1	1	2	2	—	—	—	—	—
2018–19	St. Louis Blues	NHL	78	12	23	35	45	20	2	6	8	8
2019–20	St. Louis Blues	NHL	71	9	14	23	27	9	0	3	3	8
2020–21	St. Louis Blues	NHL	43	6	14	20	18	—	—	—	—	—
2021–22	Seattle Kraken	NHL	73	7	28	35	63	—	—	—	—	—
2022–23	Seattle Kraken	NHL	81	14	50	64	55	14	1	6	7	22
2023–24	Seattle Kraken	NHL	59	11	35	46	78	—	—	—	—	—
2024–25	Seattle Kraken	NHL	62	11	28	39	33	—	—	—	—	—
2025–26	Seattle Kraken	NHL	81	11	33	44	54	—	—	—	—	—
NHL totals			623	86	244	330	393	43	3	15	18	38

== Awards and honours ==
Award	Year	Ref
OHL
CHL Top Prospects Game	2015	
IceDogs Top Defenceman of the Year	2015, 2016	
NHL
Stanley Cup champion	2019	
