= 2019 Stanley Cup Final =

2019 ice hockey championship series

	1	2	3	4	5	6	7	Total
St. Louis Blues	2	3*	2	4	2	1	4	4
Boston Bruins	4	2*	7	2	1	5	1	3
- * – Denotes overtime period(s)
- Location(s): St. Louis: Enterprise Center (3, 4, 6); Boston: TD Garden (1, 2, 5, 7)
- Coaches: St. Louis: Craig Berube (interim); Boston: Bruce Cassidy
- Captains: St. Louis: Alex Pietrangelo; Boston: Zdeno Chara
- National anthems: St. Louis: Charles Glenn (vocalist) and Jeremy Boyer (organist); Boston: Todd Angilly (vocalist) and Ron Poster (organist)
- Referees: Gord Dwyer (2, 4, 6, 7); Steve Kozari (1, 3, 5); Chris Rooney (2, 4, 6, 7); Kelly Sutherland (1, 3, 5)
- Dates: May 27 – June 12, 2019
- MVP: Ryan O'Reilly (Blues)
- Series-winning goal: Alex Pietrangelo (19:52, first)
- Hall of Famers: Bruins: Patrice Bergeron (2026); Zdeno Chara (2025)
- Networks: Canada: (English): CBC/Sportsnet (French): TVA Sports; United States: (English): NBC (1, 4–7), NBCSN (2–3)
- Announcers: (CBC/SN) Jim Hughson and Craig Simpson (TVA) Felix Seguin and Patrick Lalime (NBC/NBCSN) Mike Emrick, Eddie Olczyk, and Pierre McGuire (NHL International) Steve Mears, Kevin Weekes, and E.J. Hradek (NBC Sports Radio & NHL Radio) Kenny Albert, Joe Micheletti, Brian Boucher, and Steve Goldstein

The 2019 Stanley Cup Final was the championship series of the National Hockey League's (NHL) 2018–19 season and the culmination of the 2019 Stanley Cup playoffs. The Western Conference champion St. Louis Blues defeated the Eastern Conference champion Boston Bruins four games to three in the best-of-seven series. It was the Blues' first championship, in their 51st season of play (not including the 2004–05 lockout), ending what was then the third-longest championship drought in league history. The Bruins had home-ice advantage in the series with the better regular season record. The series began on May 27 and concluded on June 12. The Blues' Stanley Cup-winning run of 26 playoff games tied the 2013–14 Los Angeles Kings for the longest of any Stanley Cup-winning team.

This was a rematch of the 1970 Stanley Cup Final, which Boston won in four games. This was the fourth consecutive Final to both involve at least one team vying for its first championship and end with the champion clinching the Cup on the road. It was also the first time since 2011 where the Final went the full seven games.

Entering the 2019 Final, the Blues were the only active team from the 1967 NHL expansion to have not won a Stanley Cup. The Blues' victory resulted in all five of the active 1967 expansion teams obtaining a Stanley Cup title, while the Buffalo Sabres and Vancouver Canucks became the oldest active expansion franchises to not win one, and the Toronto Maple Leafs became the last active team not to win the Cup since the expansion era.

This is the most recent professional sports championship won by a St. Louis-based team, and was the last time the Stanley Cup Final did not feature a team from Florida until 2026, and the most recent not to include a team from the Southern United States.

== Paths to the Final ==
This was the eleventh meeting between teams from Boston and St. Louis for a major professional sports championship. This previously happened in four World Series (1946, 1967, 2004, 2013), four NBA Finals (1957, 1958, 1960, 1961), Super Bowl XXXVI in 2002, and the 1970 Stanley Cup Final.

=== Boston Bruins ===
This was the Boston Bruins' 20th appearance in the Stanley Cup Final, six years after 2013, when they faced the Presidents' Trophy-winning Chicago Blackhawks and were defeated in six games. The Bruins last won the Stanley Cup in 2011 against the Presidents' Trophy-winning Vancouver Canucks in seven games, their sixth Cup in franchise history.

Brad Marchand became the first Bruin since the 2005–06 season to score 100 points, finishing the regular season with 100 points in 79 games. David Pastrnak led the team in goals with 38. Tuukka Rask and Jaroslav Halak split the goaltending duties during the regular season. Halak had signed with the team during the off-season, and approaching the trade deadline the Bruins acquired forwards Charlie Coyle and Marcus Johansson.

Boston finished the regular season with 107 points, finishing in second place in the Atlantic Division and third overall in the league. In the first round of the playoffs, they defeated the Toronto Maple Leafs in seven games for the second consecutive playoff meeting against the Maple Leafs and third since the 2012–13 season. They then defeated the Columbus Blue Jackets 4–2 in the second round. In the conference finals, Boston swept the Carolina Hurricanes.

=== St. Louis Blues ===
This was the St. Louis Blues' fourth appearance in the Stanley Cup Final. Their last appearance in the Final was in 1970 against the Bruins, which Boston won in a four-game sweep. All of St. Louis' prior appearances came during their first three seasons after the Blues and five other new teams formed the West Division in the 1967 NHL expansion. While the Blues were able to advance past their fellow expansion franchises, each Final appearance ended with them being swept by Original Six teams that comprised the East Division, concluding with their 1970 defeat. In the years that followed, the other expansion teams from 1967 would win Stanley Cup titles (excluding the defunct California Golden Seals franchise), but the Blues went nearly half a century without reaching the Final again and became the oldest franchise not to win the Stanley Cup.

Ryan O'Reilly, who was acquired via trade in the off-season led the team in scoring with 77 points and assists with 49. Vladimir Tarasenko led the team in goal-scoring with 33 goals.

St. Louis struggled early in the regular season, beginning the year with a 7–9–3 record. Head coach Mike Yeo was fired and assistant coach Craig Berube was named interim coach. Their record declined to an NHL-worst 15–18–4 with 34 points on January 2, 2019. However, the Blues went on a 30–10–5 run to finish the season with 99 points, third in the Central Division. Amid their turnaround, rookie goaltender Jordan Binnington was given his first start and went on to obtain 23 wins. In the playoffs, St. Louis defeated the Winnipeg Jets 4–2 in the first round, eliminated the Dallas Stars in seven games in the second round, and won 4–2 against the San Jose Sharks in the conference finals.

== Game summaries ==
Note: Number in parentheses represents the player's total goals or assists to that point of the entire four rounds of the playoffs

=== Game one ===
May 27	St. Louis Blues	2–4	Boston Bruins	TD Garden	Recap

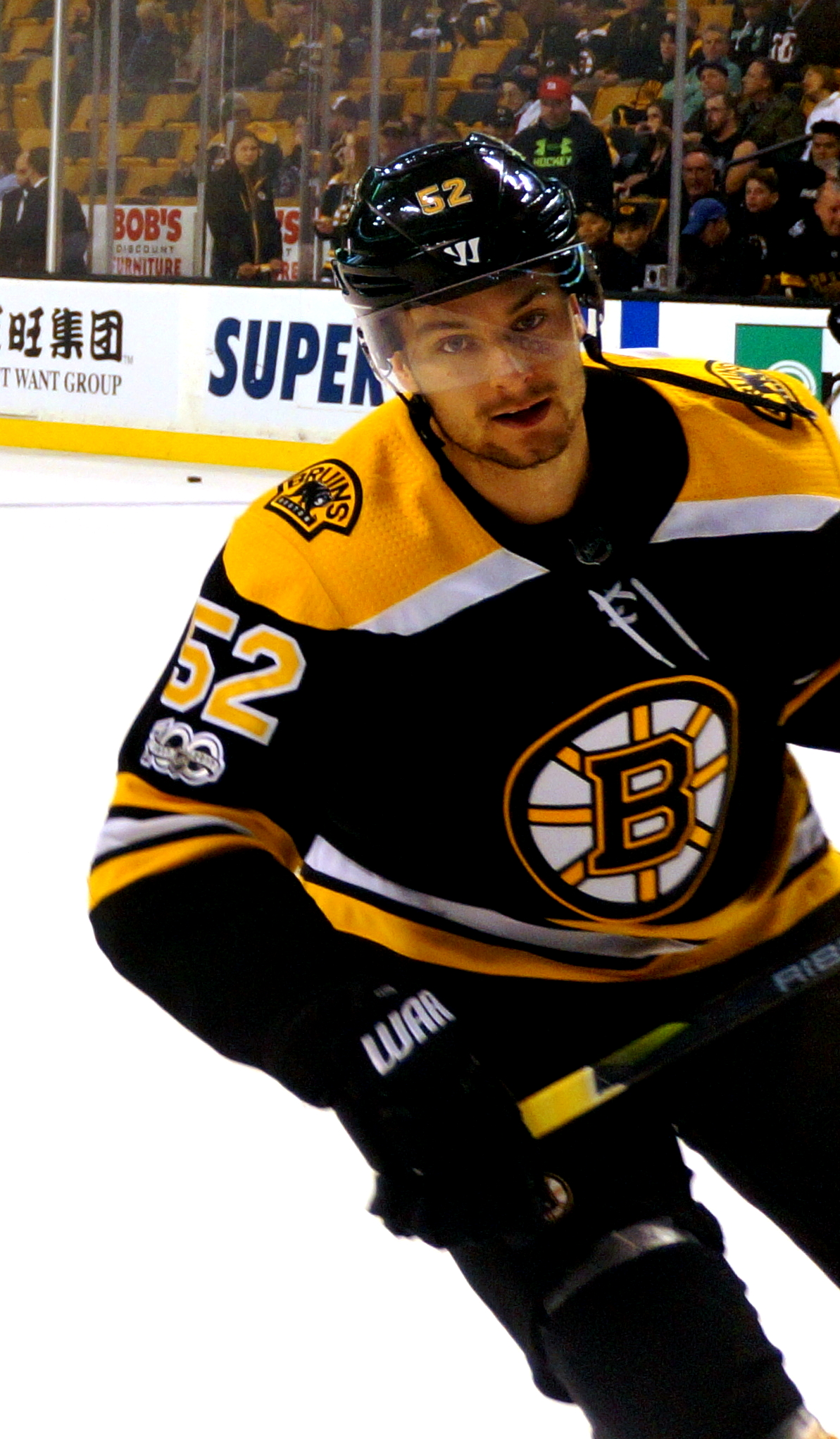
Sean Kuraly scored two points, including the game-winning goal, in Game 1.

In game one, Brayden Schenn scored the first goal of the Final for the Blues, firing a wrist shot past Tuukka Rask. In the second period, Bruins forward David Pastrnak mistakenly passed back to an open Schenn who gave the puck to Vladimir Tarasenko who doubled the lead for St. Louis. The Bruins quickly scored after, as a pass by Sean Kuraly deflected off of intended target Connor Clifton's skate and then goalie Jordan Binnington's stick and into the net. Charlie McAvoy then tied the game on the power play speeding through the Blues zone to put one past Binnington. In the third period, Boston gained the lead as a net-mouth scramble ended up on Sean Kuraly's stick who fired it past Binnington. The Bruins continued their shot output, placing ten more on Binnington before being pulled. Brad Marchand sealed the Bruins victory after a successful defensive zone face-off put the puck into the Blues' zone and the forward shot it into the empty net.

Scoring summary
Period	Team	Goal	Assist(s)	Time	Score
1st	STL	Brayden Schenn (3)	Jaden Schwartz (5) and Jay Bouwmeester (6)	07:23	1–0 STL
2nd	STL	Vladimir Tarasenko (9)	Brayden Schenn (6)	01:00	2–0 STL
2nd	BOS	Connor Clifton (2)	Sean Kuraly (4) and Joakim Nordstrom (3)	02:16	2–1 STL
2nd	BOS	Charlie McAvoy (2) – pp	Unassisted	12:41	2–2
3rd	BOS	Sean Kuraly (3)	Noel Acciari (2) and Zdeno Chara (3)	05:21	3–2 BOS
3rd	BOS	Brad Marchand (8) – en	Unassisted	18:11	4–2 BOS
Penalty summary
Period	Team	Player	Penalty	Time	PIM
1st	BOS	Sean Kuraly	Tripping	03:37	2:00
1st	STL	David Perron	Tripping	13:15	2:00
1st	STL	Robert Thomas	Hooking	16:45	2:00
2nd	STL	Joel Edmundson	High-sticking	05:25	2:00
2nd	STL	Oskar Sundqvist	Cross-checking	11:04	2:00
3rd	BOS	David Krejci	Illegal check to head	06:55	2:00
3rd	STL	Samuel Blais	Interference	13:28	2:00

Shots by period
Team	1	2	3	Total
STL	8	3	9	20
BOS	8	18	12	38

=== Game two ===
May 29	St. Louis Blues	3–2	OT	Boston Bruins	TD Garden	Recap

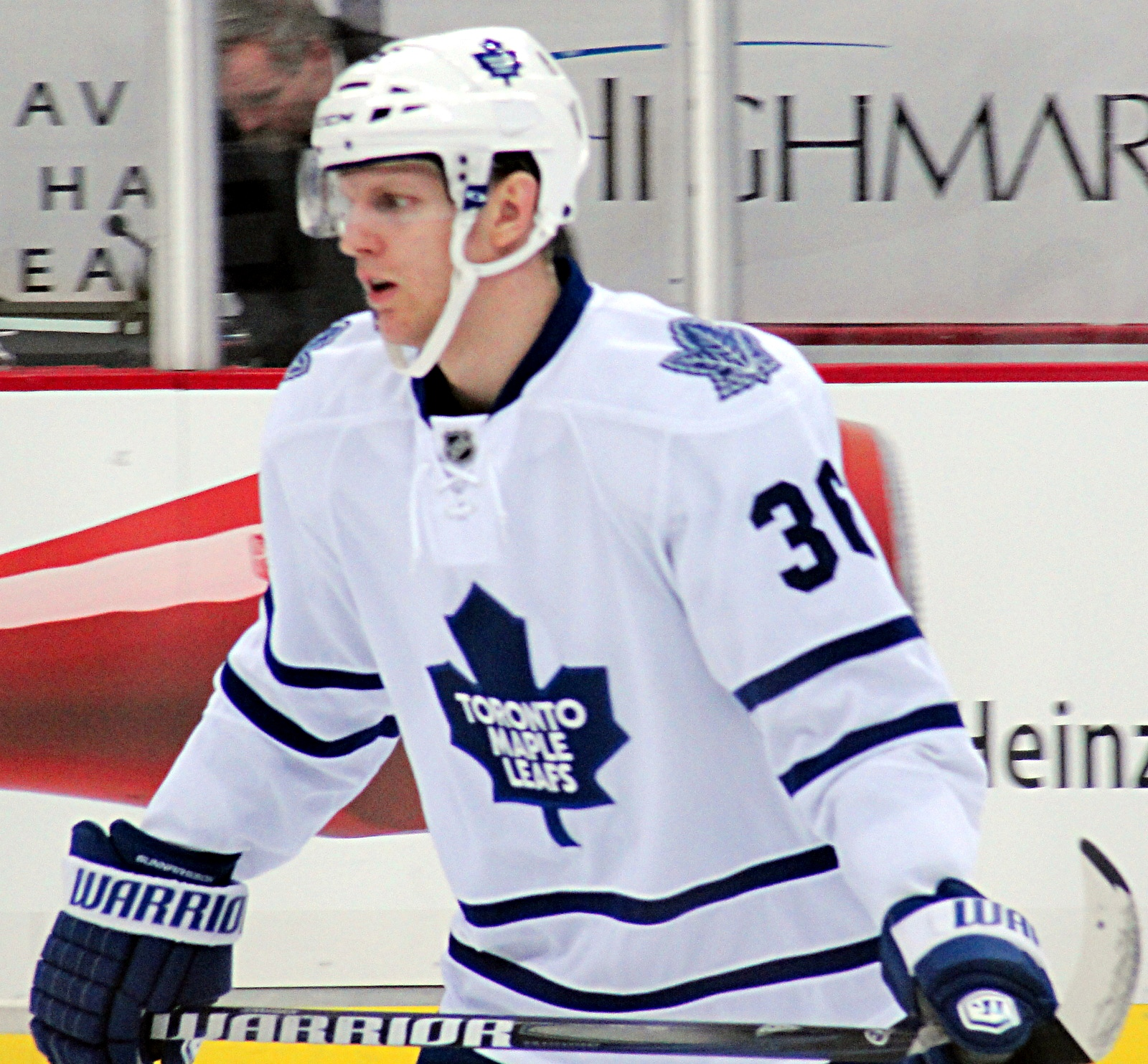
Carl Gunnarsson, shown with Toronto, scored two points, including the overtime game-winning goal in Game 2.

In game two, Boston scored the first goal when Samuel Blais was given a penalty for goaltender interference and Charlie Coyle put the puck past St. Louis goaltender Jordan Binnington. The Blues struck back when Robert Bortuzzo's shot deflected off of Matt Grzelcyk and squeaked past Tuukka Rask on the short side. The Bruins scored 40 seconds later to take the lead again with Joakim Nordstrom moving around the St. Louis defenceman and backhanding his shot past Binnington. Vladimir Tarasenko then tied the game for the Blues when his shot rebounded off of Rask and backhanded his shot into the open net. In the second period, the Blues dominated in shots fourteen to six but neither team scored. However, Blues forward Tyler Bozak was high-sticked resulting in an injury to the forward; St. Louis was granted a 4-minute power-play. The teams were even in shots in the third period, but with no scoring, the game went into overtime. During the overtime period, Bruins defenceman Brandon Carlo tripped up Alexander Steen and on the delayed penalty, Carl Gunnarsson fired a slap shot past Rask giving St. Louis their first victory in the Final in franchise history and tying the series 1–1.

Scoring summary
Period	Team	Goal	Assist(s)	Time	Score
1st	BOS	Charlie Coyle (7) – pp	Jake DeBrusk (5) and David Pastrnak (9)	04:44	1–0 BOS
1st	STL	Robert Bortuzzo (2)	Tyler Bozak (6) and Carl Gunnarsson (1)	09:37	1–1
1st	BOS	Joakim Nordstrom (3)	Sean Kuraly (5)	10:17	2–1 BOS
1st	STL	Vladimir Tarasenko (10)	Jaden Schwartz (6)	14:55	2–2
2nd	None				
3rd	None				
OT	STL	Carl Gunnarsson (1)	Ryan O'Reilly (12) and Oskar Sundqvist (5)	03:51	3–2 STL
Penalty summary
Period	Team	Player	Penalty	Time	PIM
1st	STL	Samuel Blais	Goaltender interference	03:55	2:00
1st	STL	Oskar Sundqvist	Boarding	17:57	2:00
2nd	BOS	Connor Clifton	Interference	03:34	2:00
2nd	STL	Joel Edmundson	Tripping	12:19	2:00
2nd	BOS	Connor Clifton	High-sticking – double minor	15:39	4:00
2nd	STL	Jaden Schwartz	Goaltender interference	17:56	2:00
3rd	STL	Brayden Schenn	Slashing	13:22	2:00
OT	None (Note: The game winning goal was scored on a delayed penalty.)				

Shots by period
Team	1	2	3	OT	Total
STL	10	14	9	4	37
BOS	8	6	9	0	23

=== Game three ===
June 1	Boston Bruins	7–2	St. Louis Blues	Enterprise Center	Recap

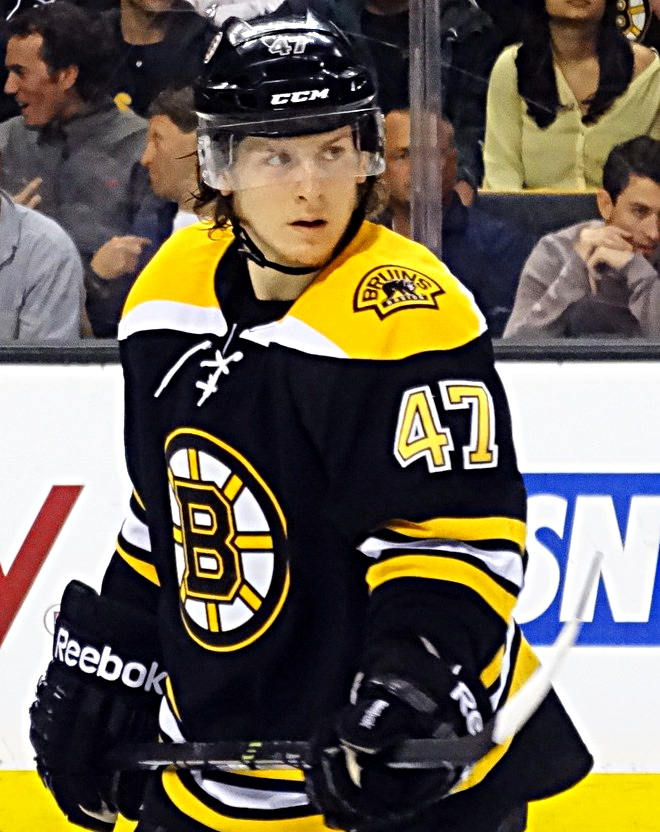
Torey Krug scored four points in Game 3, setting a Bruins franchise record.

In game three, Boston took over the first period with three unanswered goals. The first came from Patrice Bergeron on the power-play. The next came from Charlie Coyle whose wrist shot got past Blues goaltender Jordan Binnington. The last goal came from Sean Kuraly with less than ten seconds in the period; the goal was unsuccessfully challenged on an offside review. With power-play given to the Bruins from the failed offside challenge, David Pastrnak capitalized in the second period, backhanding his shot past Binnington. The Blues were able to get on the board as Zach Sanford passed to an open Ivan Barbashev for his third goal of the playoffs. However, the Bruins quickly had their four-goal restored when Colton Parayko was sent to the penalty box for high-sticking and Torey Krug cashed in for Boston's third power-play goal of the game. Binnington was pulled from the game following this goal and replaced with Jake Allen. In the third period, a roughing penalty by Bruins captain Zdeno Chara proved costly as Parayko scored on the given power-play, his slap shot deflecting off of Brandon Carlo. Although the Blues out shot the Bruins eleven to four, beyond the one goal, St. Louis could not get another past Tuukka Rask. Bruins forward Noel Acciari scored an empty-net goal to add insurance. Boston added another power-play goal with Marcus Johansson's slap shot cleanly beating Allen finalizing the score at 7–2. The Bruins scored on every power-play that they had in the game, scoring on each of their four power-play shots.

Scoring summary
Period	Team	Goal	Assist(s)	Time	Score
1st	BOS	Patrice Bergeron (9) – pp	Torey Krug (12), Jake DeBrusk (6)	10:47	1–0 BOS
1st	BOS	Charlie Coyle (8)	Marcus Johansson (7) and Danton Heinen (6)	17:40	2–0 BOS
1st	BOS	Sean Kuraly (4)	Joakim Nordstrom (4)	19:50	3–0 BOS
2nd	BOS	David Pastrnak (8) – pp	Torey Krug (13) and Patrice Bergeron (8)	00:41	4–0 BOS
2nd	STL	Ivan Barbashev (3)	Zach Sanford (1) and Alexander Steen (3)	11:05	4–1 BOS
2nd	BOS	Torey Krug (2) – pp	Brad Marchand (12) and Patrice Bergeron (7)	12:12	5–1 BOS
3rd	STL	Colton Parayko (2) – pp	Ryan O'Reilly (13) and Tyler Bozak (7)	05:24	5–2 BOS
3rd	BOS	Noel Acciari (2) – en	Joakim Nordstrom (5) and Charlie Coyle (7)	18:12	6–2 BOS
3rd	BOS	Marcus Johansson (2) – pp	Torey Krug (14) and Connor Clifton (3)	18:35	7–2 BOS
Penalty summary
Period	Team	Player	Penalty	Time	PIM
1st	BOS	Jake DeBrusk	Kneeing	01:02	2:00
1st	STL	David Perron	Interference	10:26	2:00
1st	BOS	Connor Clifton	Roughing	14:22	2:00
1st	STL	Ivan Barbashev	Unsportsmanlike conduct	14:22	2:00
1st	STL	Bench (served by David Perron)	Delay of game (unsuccessful coach's challenge)	19:50	2:00
2nd	BOS	Charlie McAvoy	Slashing	07:37	2:00
2nd	STL	Patrick Maroon	Unsportsmanlike conduct	07:37	2:00
2nd	BOS	Zdeno Chara	Unsportsmanlike conduct	07:37	2:00
2nd	STL	Colton Parayko	High-sticking	11:41	2:00
3rd	STL	David Perron	Roughing	00:54	2:00
3rd	BOS	Connor Clifton	Cross checking	00:54	2:00
3rd	BOS	Brandon Carlo	Interference	01:31	2:00
3rd	BOS	Zdeno Chara	Roughing	05:18	2:00
3rd	BOS	Jake DeBrusk	Delay of game (puck over glass)	06:04	2:00
3rd	STL	Alex Pietrangelo	Slashing	18:12	2:00

Shots by period
Team	1	2	3	Total
BOS	12	8	4	24
STL	8	10	11	29

=== Game four ===
June 3	Boston Bruins	2–4	St. Louis Blues	Enterprise Center	Recap

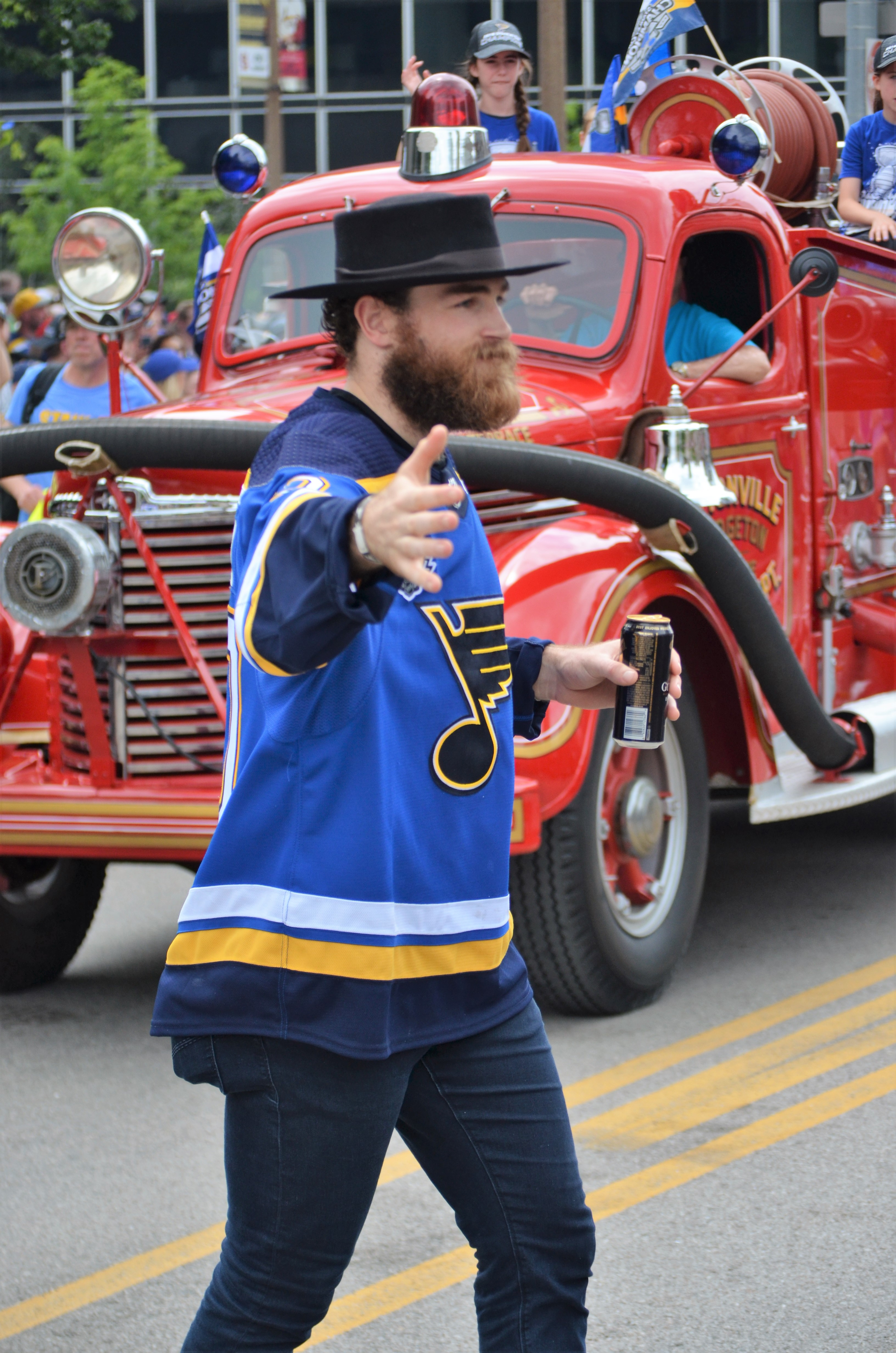
Ryan O'Reilly scored twice, including the game-winner, in Game 4. This game began his four-game goal-scoring streak.

In game four, Ryan O'Reilly scored first for the Blues, scoring a wrap-around goal 43 seconds into the game. The Bruins counter-attacked when Zdeno Chara shot at Jordan Binnington and the rebound went to Charlie Coyle who slid it past the Blues goaltender. The Blues regained the lead when Alex Pietrangelo's shot rebounded to Vladimir Tarasenko firing a wrist shot past Tuukka Rask. In the second period, with Boston forward Connor Clifton resigned to the penalty box for an illegal check to the head, the Bruins, shorthanded, tied the game as Brandon Carlo picked up a rebound to shoot it past Binnington. Midway through the third period, however, the Blues regained the lead with a rebound going to O'Reilly. The Blues staved off the Bruins, limiting Boston's shots to five. Brayden Schenn sealed the game's final score at 4–2 with an empty-net goal tying the series at 2–2.

Scoring summary
Period	Team	Goal	Assist(s)	Time	Score
1st	STL	Ryan O'Reilly (4)	Zach Sanford (2) and Vince Dunn (6)	00:43	1–0 STL
1st	BOS	Charlie Coyle (9)	Zdeno Chara (4)	13:14	1–1
1st	STL	Vladimir Tarasenko (11)	Alex Pietrangelo (12) and Brayden Schenn (7)	15:30	2–1 STL
2nd	BOS	Brandon Carlo (1) – sh	Patrice Bergeron (8) and Brad Marchand (13)	14:19	2–2
3rd	STL	Ryan O'Reilly (5)	Alex Pietrangelo (13) and Carl Gunnarsson (2)	10:38	3–2 STL
3rd	STL	Brayden Schenn (4) – en	Unassisted	18:31	4–2 STL
Penalty summary
Period	Team	Player	Penalty	Time	PIM
1st	None				
2nd	BOS	Charlie Coyle	High-sticking	05:47	2:00
2nd	STL	Colton Parayko	Delay of game (puck over glass)	08:31	2:00
2nd	BOS	Connor Clifton	Illegal check to head	13:53	2:00
3rd	BOS	Danton Heinen	Tripping	02:08	2:00
3rd	STL	Jay Bouwmeester	High-sticking	06:42	2:00
3rd	BOS	Torey Krug	Slashing	19:34	2:00
3rd	STL	Jay Bouwmeester	Elbowing	19:34	2:00

Shots by period
Team	1	2	3	Total
BOS	9	10	4	23
STL	13	12	13	38

=== Game five ===
June 6	St. Louis Blues	2–1	Boston Bruins	TD Garden	Recap

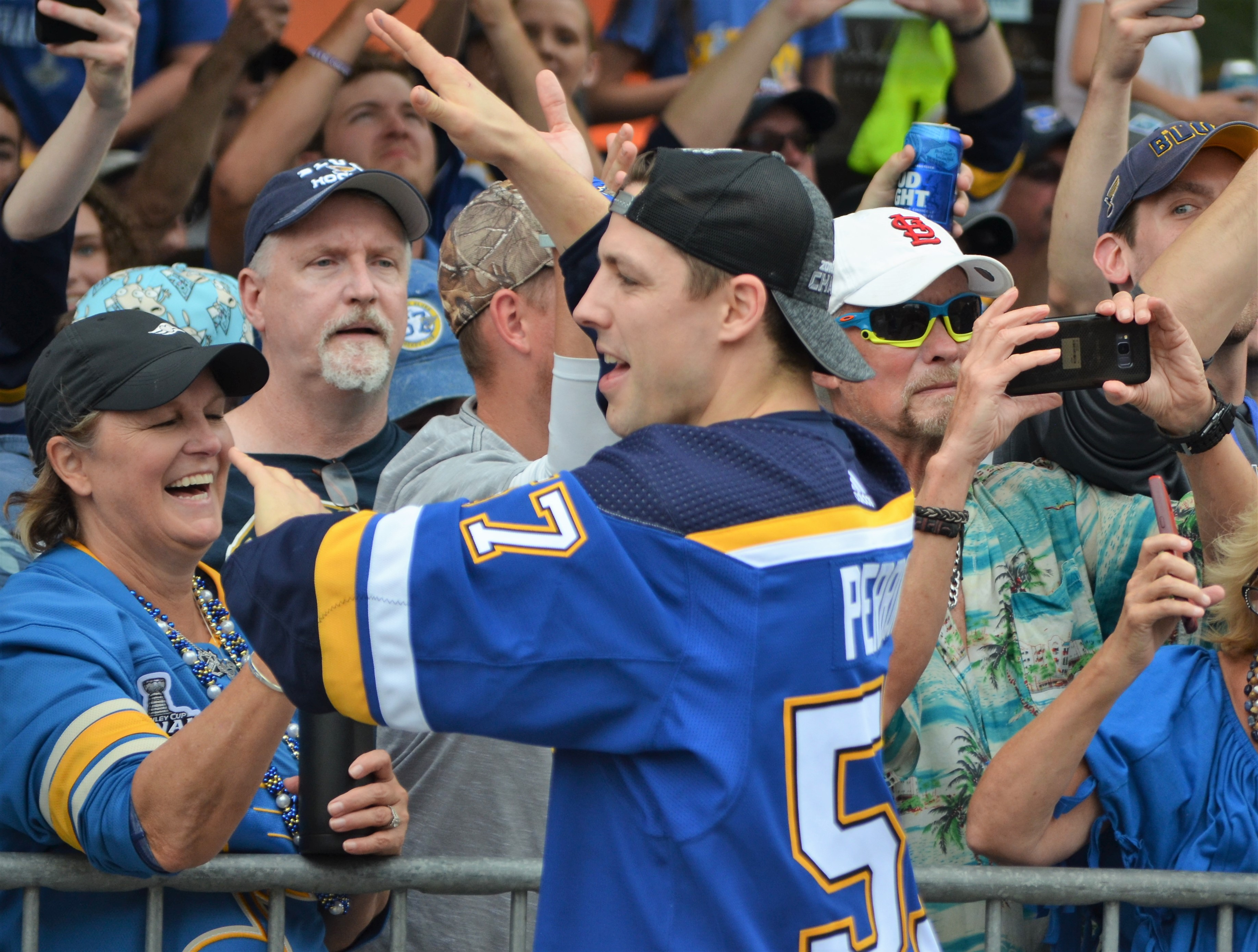
David Perron scored the game-winning goal in Game 5.

In game five, the Bruins piled on seventeen shots in the first period, but Blues goaltender Jordan Binnington held down the fort. The Blues got the first goal of the game in the second period as Ryan O'Reilly backhanded a shot past Tuukka Rask. The Bruins continued the pressure into the third period. In the third period, controversy occurred when Blues forward Tyler Bozak tripped Noel Acciari, but no penalty was called on the play. With play continuing while Acciari was down on the ice, David Perron scored with the puck deflecting off Rask into the net. The Bruins got on the board with less than seven minutes remaining when Oskar Sundqvist high-sticked Torey Krug, causing a delayed penalty, and the Boston defenceman passed to an open Jake DeBrusk who fired it past Binnington. The Blues played defensively for the final minutes to win the game 2–1 and lead the series 3–2.

Scoring summary
Period	Team	Goal	Assist(s)	Time	Score
1st	None				
2nd	STL	Ryan O'Reilly (6)	Zach Sanford (3) and Alex Pietrangelo (14)	00:55	1–0 STL
3rd	STL	David Perron (7)	Ryan O'Reilly (14)	10:36	2–0 STL
3rd	BOS	Jake DeBrusk (4)	Torey Krug (15)	13:32	2–1 STL
Penalty summary
Period	Team	Player	Penalty	Time	PIM
1st	STL	Vince Dunn	Delay of game (puck over glass)	06:27	2:00
1st	BOS	Brad Marchand	Slashing	17:22	2:00
2nd	STL	David Perron	Interference	09:25	2:00
3rd	STL	Alexander Steen	Interference	03:09	2:00

Shots by period
Team	1	2	3	Total
STL	8	6	7	21
BOS	17	8	14	39

=== Game six ===
June 9	Boston Bruins	5–1	St. Louis Blues	Enterprise Center	Recap

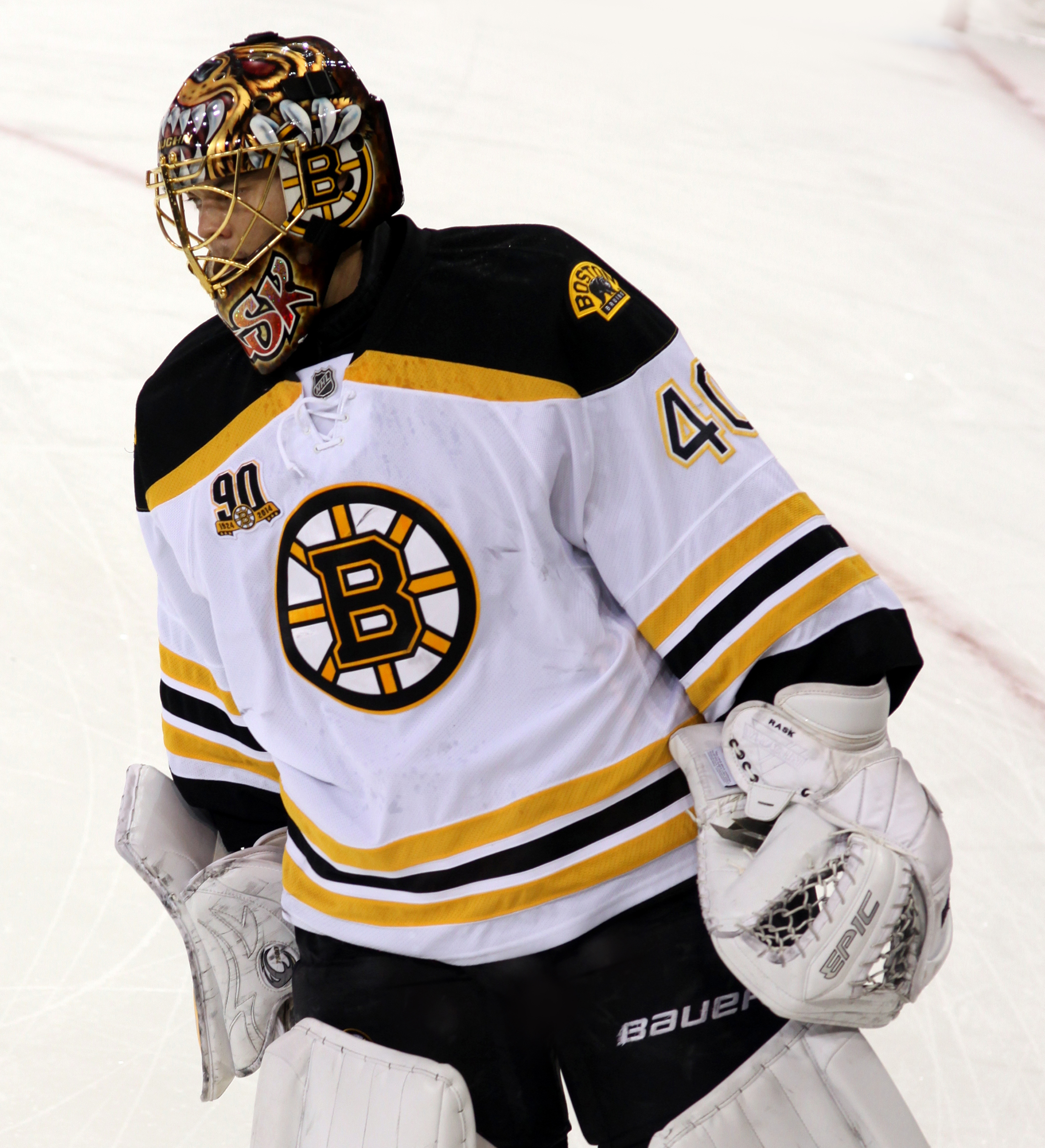
Tuukka Rask saved 28 of 29 shots faced in Game 6.

In game six, after both Brayden Schenn and Ryan O'Reilly were sent to the penalty box for boarding and delay of game respectively, Boston forward Brad Marchand scored on the resulting 5-on-3 power play. In the second period, both teams were relatively even in shots, Boston with eight and St. Louis with ten, but neither team scored. In the third period, Bruins defenceman Brandon Carlo shot a bouncing puck towards Jordan Binnington which snuck under the Blues goaltender's blocker for the second goal of the game. Karson Kuhlman gave Boston a three-goal lead with his first goal of the playoffs. St. Louis got on the board when O'Reilly's shot appeared to cross the goal line after a video replay. The Bruins regained their three-goal lead when the Blues in a defensive scramble left David Pastnak alone in front of the net and he fired the puck past Binnington. The Blues pulled Binnington in an attempt to tie the game, but Zdeno Chara sealed the victory for the Bruins finalizing the score at 5–1 and sending the series to a seventh game.

Scoring summary
Period	Team	Goal	Assist(s)	Time	Score
1st	BOS	Brad Marchand (9) – pp	David Pastrnak (10) and Torey Krug (16)	08:40	1–0 BOS
2nd	None				
3rd	BOS	Brandon Carlo (2)	Jake DeBrusk (7)	02:31	2–0 BOS
3rd	BOS	Karson Kuhlman (1)	David Krejci (11)	10:15	3–0 BOS
3rd	STL	Ryan O'Reilly (7)	Alex Pietrangelo (15) and David Perron (8)	12:01	3–1 BOS
3rd	BOS	David Pastrnak (9)	Brad Marchand (14) and Sean Kuraly (6)	14:06	4–1 BOS
3rd	BOS	Zdeno Chara (2) – en	Unassisted	17:41	5–1 BOS
Penalty summary
Period	Team	Player	Penalty	Time	PIM
1st	BOS	Sean Kuraly	Delay of game (puck over glass)	02:42	2:00
1st	STL	Brayden Schenn	Boarding	07:17	2:00
1st	STL	Ryan O'Reilly	Delay of game (puck over glass)	08:19	2:00
1st	BOS	Zdeno Chara	Interference	18:21	2:00
2nd	BOS	Brad Marchand	Tripping	09:11	2:00
2nd	BOS	Charlie McAvoy	Tripping	13:43	2:00
3rd	STL	Samuel Blais	Slashing	19:38	2:00
3rd	STL	Samuel Blais	Roughing	19:38	2:00
3rd	BOS	Connor Clifton	Roughing	19:38	2:00
3rd	STL	Robert Bortuzzo	Cross-checking	19:43	2:00
3rd	STL	Robert Bortuzzo	Misconduct	19:43	10:00

Shots by period
Team	1	2	3	Total
BOS	12	8	12	32
STL	9	10	10	29

=== Game seven ===
June 12	St. Louis Blues	4–1	Boston Bruins	TD Garden	Recap

External videos
- Game 7 Full replay (NHL International's feed) on the NHL's official YouTube channel

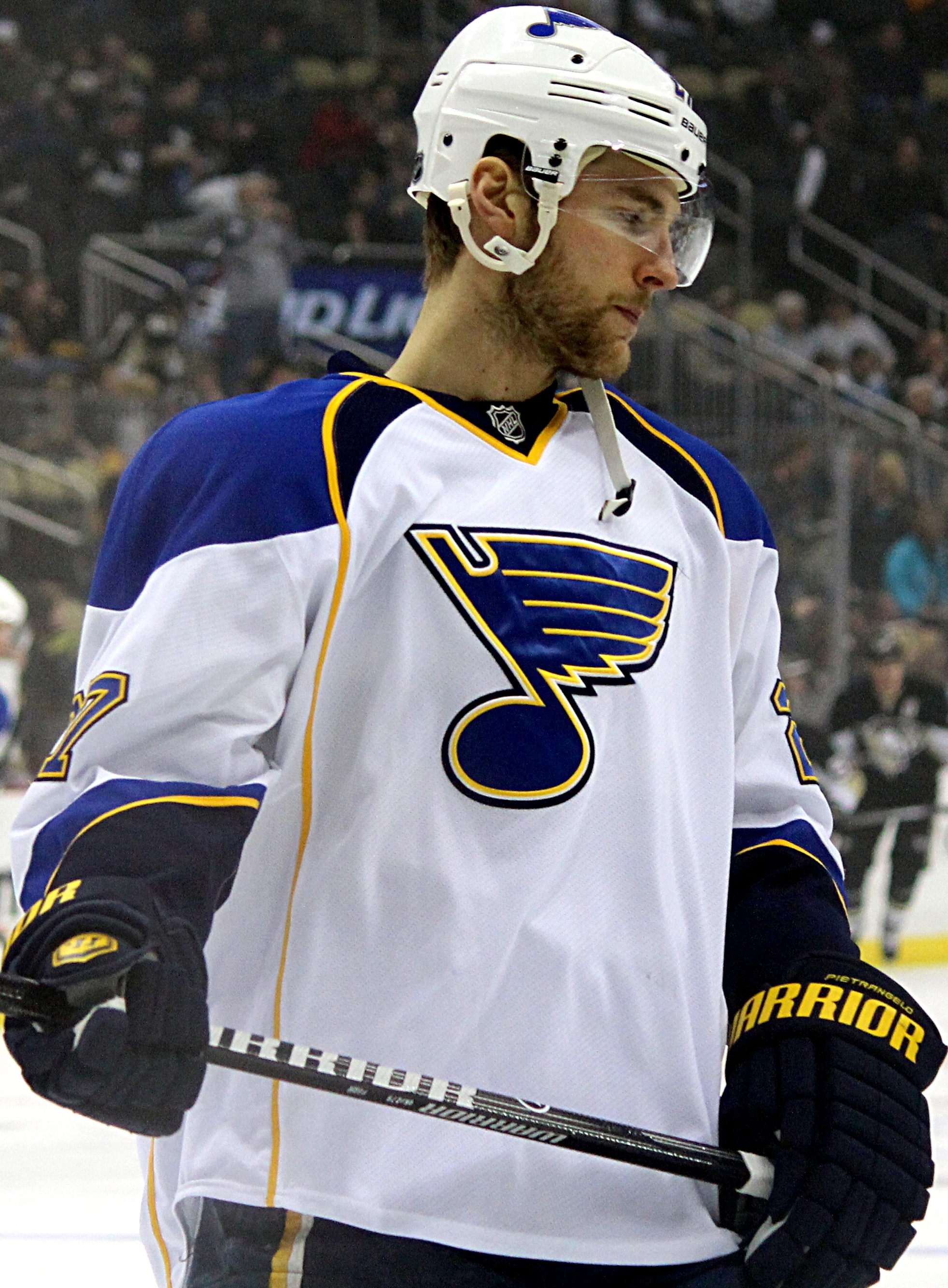
Alex Pietrangelo scored the Stanley Cup-clinching goal in Game 7.

In game seven, Jay Bouwmeester's shot got through a screen of players and Ryan O'Reilly tipped the puck past Tuukka Rask for the opening goal. The Blues increased their lead with eight seconds remaining in the first period when Jaden Schwartz passed to an open Alex Pietrangelo who backhanded his shot for his third goal of the playoffs. Boston continued to pressure St. Louis in the second period with eleven shots, but Jordan Binnington kept the score at 2–0. In the third period, Vladimir Tarasenko followed the puck into the Bruins' zone and passed to an open Brayden Schenn who fired the puck past Rask. Zach Sanford made the score 4–0 as the Blues continued to work in the offensive zone, with David Perron working around the Bruins defenceman to pass to the open rookie forward. The Bruins then swapped Rask for an extra attacker and thwarted Binnington's shutout attempt with a goal from Matt Grzelcyk. With the 4–1 victory, the Blues became the last remaining expansion franchise from 1967 to win the Stanley Cup. O'Reilly was awarded the Conn Smythe Trophy as the most valuable player in the playoffs.

Scoring summary
Period	Team	Goal	Assist(s)	Time	Score
1st	STL	Ryan O'Reilly (8)	Jay Bouwmeester (7) and Alex Pietrangelo (16)	16:47	1–0 STL
1st	STL	Alex Pietrangelo (3)	Jaden Schwartz (7)	19:52	2–0 STL
2nd	None				
3rd	STL	Brayden Schenn (5)	Vladimir Tarasenko (6) and Jaden Schwartz (8)	11:25	3–0 STL
3rd	STL	Zach Sanford (1)	David Perron (6) and Ryan O'Reilly (15)	15:22	4–0 STL
3rd	BOS	Matt Grzelcyk (4)	David Krejci (12)	17:50	4–1 STL
Penalty summary
Period	Team	Player	Penalty	Time	PIM
1st	STL	Colton Parayko	Delay of game (puck over glass)	07:57	2:00
2nd	None				
3rd	None				

Shots by period
Team	1	2	3	Total
STL	4	6	10	20
BOS	12	11	10	33

== Team rosters ==
Years indicated in boldface under the "Final appearance" column signify that the player won the Stanley Cup in the given year.

=== Boston Bruins ===
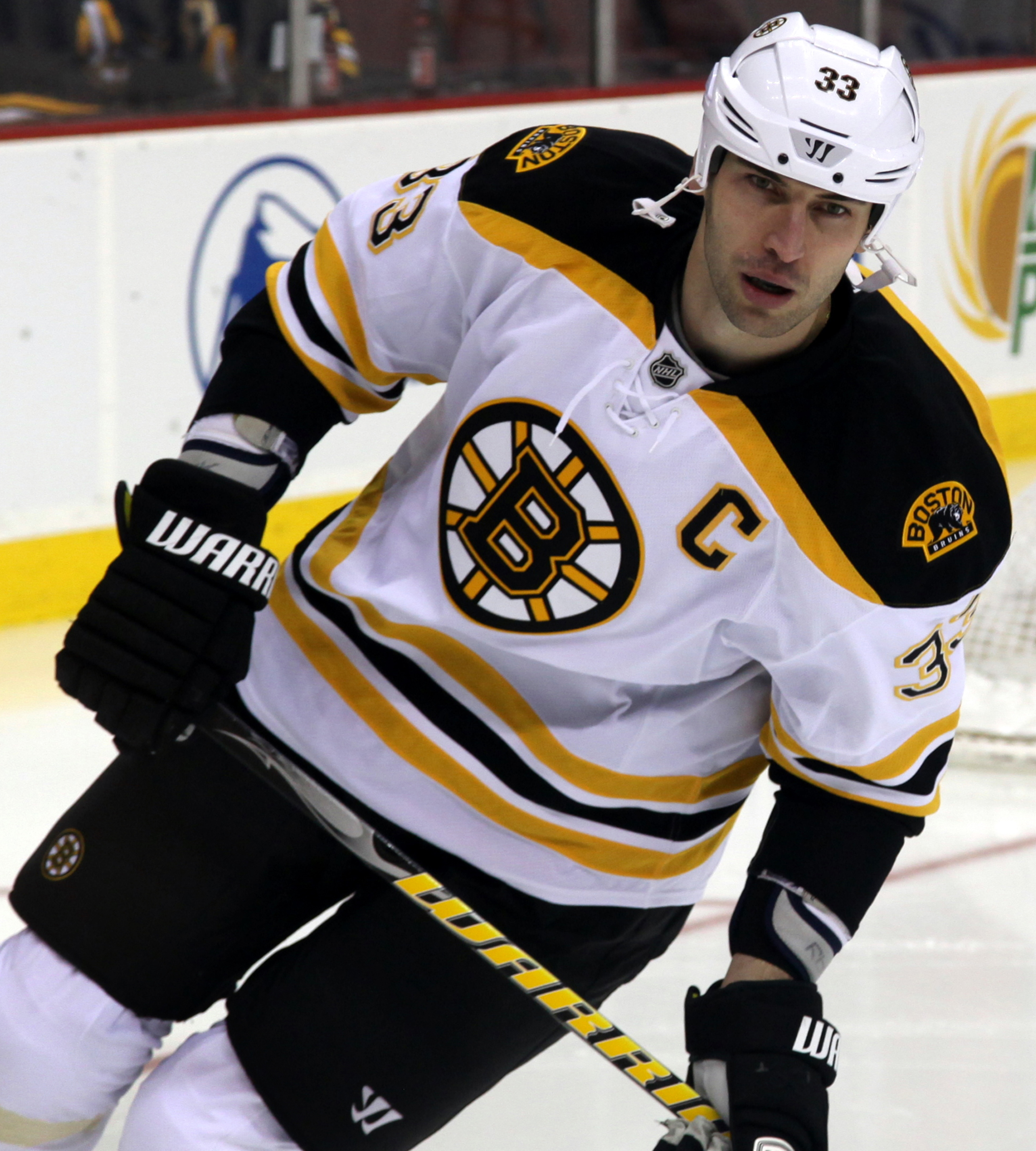
Zdeno Chara captained the Bruins to their third Stanley Cup Final appearance in the 2010s decade

#	Nat	Player	Position	Hand	Age	Acquired	Place of birth	Final appearance
55	(United States)	Noel Acciari	C/W	R	27	2015	Johnston, Rhode Island	first
42	(United States)	David Backes	RW	R	35	2016	Minneapolis, Minnesota	first
37	(Canada)	Patrice Bergeron – **A**	C	R	33	2003	L'Ancienne-Lorette, Quebec	third (**2011**, 2013)
25	(United States)	Brandon Carlo	D	R	22	2015	Colorado Springs, Colorado	first
33	(Slovakia)	Zdeno Chara – **C**	D	L	42	2006	Trenčín, Czechoslovakia	third (**2011**, 2013)
75	(United States)	Connor Clifton	D	R	24	2018	Long Branch, New Jersey	first
13	(United States)	Charlie Coyle	C	R	27	2019	Weymouth, Massachusetts	first
74	(Canada)	Jake DeBrusk	LW	L	22	2015	Edmonton, Alberta	first
48	(United States)	Matt Grzelcyk	D	L	25	2012	Charlestown, Massachusetts	first
43	(Canada)	Danton Heinen	C/W	L	23	2014	Langley, British Columbia	first
41	(Slovakia)	Jaroslav Halak	G	L	34	2018	Bratislava, Czechoslovakia	first
90	(Sweden)	Marcus Johansson	LW/C	L	28	2019	Landskrona, Sweden	first
44	(United States)	Steven Kampfer	D	R	30	2018	Ann Arbor, Michigan	second (**2011**)
46	(Czech Republic)	David Krejci – **A**	C	R	33	2004	Šternberk, Czechoslovakia	third (**2011**, 2013)
47	(United States)	Torey Krug	D	L	28	2012	Livonia, Michigan	second (2013)
83	(United States)	Karson Kuhlman	C/W	R	23	2018	Esko, Minnesota	first
52	(United States)	Sean Kuraly	C	L	26	2015	Dublin, Ohio	first
63	(Canada)	Brad Marchand	LW	L	31	2006	Halifax, Nova Scotia	third (**2011**, 2013)
73	(United States)	Charlie McAvoy	D	R	21	2016	Long Beach, New York	first
27	(United States)	John Moore	D	L	28	2018	Winnetka, Illinois	second (2014)
20	(Sweden)	Joakim Nordstrom	C	L	27	2018	Stockholm, Sweden	second (**2015**)
88	(Czech Republic)	David Pastrnak	RW	R	23	2014	Havířov, Czech Republic	first
40	(Finland)	Tuukka Rask	G	L	32	2006	Savonlinna, Finland	third (**2011**, 2013)
14	(United States)	Chris Wagner	RW	R	28	2018	Walpole, Massachusetts	first

=== St. Louis Blues ===
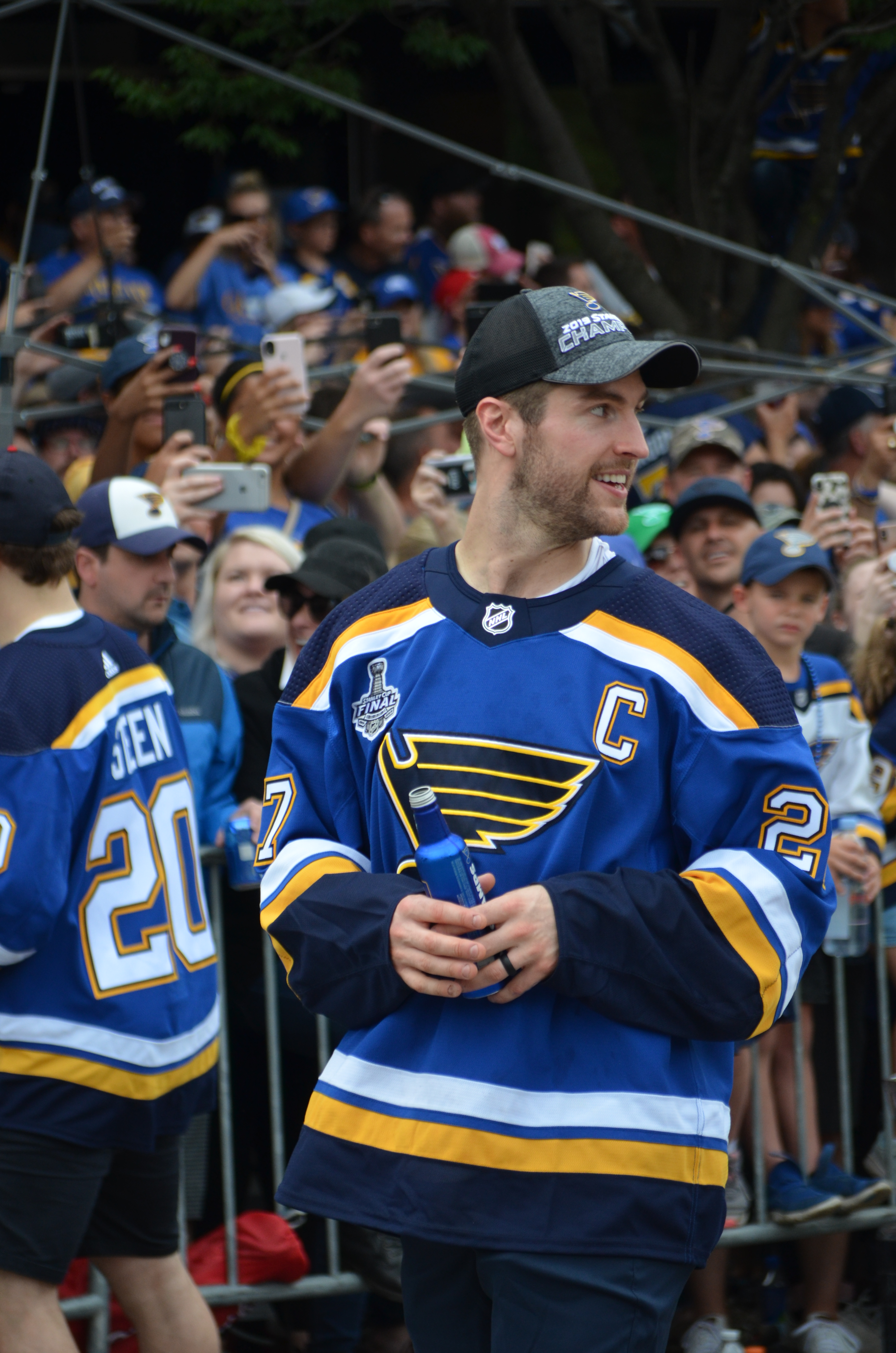
Alex Pietrangelo captained the Blues to the franchise's first Stanley Cup championship and first Final appearance in 49 years

#	Nat	Player	Position	Hand	Age	Acquired	Place of birth	Final appearance
34	(Canada)	Jake Allen	G	L	28	2008	Fredericton, New Brunswick	first
49	(Russia)	Ivan Barbashev	C	L	23	2014	Moscow, Russia	first
50	(Canada)	Jordan Binnington	G	L	25	2011	Richmond Hill, Ontario	first
9	(Canada)	Samuel Blais	LW	L	22	2014	Montmagny, Quebec	first
41	(Canada)	Robert Bortuzzo	D	R	30	2015	Thunder Bay, Ontario	first
19	(Canada)	Jay Bouwmeester	D	L	35	2013	Edmonton, Alberta	first
21	(Canada)	Tyler Bozak	C	R	33	2018	Regina, Saskatchewan	first
42	(Canada)	Michael Del Zotto	D	L	28	2019	Stouffville, Ontario	first (did not play)
29	(Canada)	Vince Dunn	D	L	22	2015	Peterborough, Ontario	first
6	(Canada)	Joel Edmundson	D	L	25	2011	Brandon, Manitoba	first
15	(Canada)	Robby Fabbri	C	L	23	2014	Mississauga, Ontario	first
4	(Sweden)	Carl Gunnarsson	D	L	32	2014	Örebro, Sweden	first
7	(United States)	Patrick Maroon	LW	L	31	2018	St. Louis, Missouri	first
90	(Canada)	Ryan O'Reilly	C	L	28	2018	Clinton, Ontario	first
55	(Canada)	Colton Parayko	D	R	26	2012	St. Albert, Alberta	first
57	(Canada)	David Perron	LW	R	31	2018	Sherbrooke, Quebec	second (2018)
27	(Canada)	Alex Pietrangelo – **C**	D	R	29	2008	King City, Ontario	first
12	(United States)	Zach Sanford	LW	L	24	2017	Salem, Massachusetts	first
10	(Canada)	Brayden Schenn	C	L	27	2017	Saskatoon, Saskatchewan	first
17	(Canada)	Jaden Schwartz	C/LW	L	26	2010	Melfort, Saskatchewan	first
20	(Sweden)	Alexander Steen – **A**	LW	L	35	2008	Winnipeg, Manitoba	first
70	(Sweden)	Oskar Sundqvist	C	R	25	2017	Boden, Sweden	second (**2016**)
91	(Russia)	Vladimir Tarasenko – **A**	RW	L	27	2010	Yaroslavl, Soviet Union	first
18	(Canada)	Robert Thomas	C	R	19	2017	Aurora, Ontario	first

== Stanley Cup engraving ==
The Stanley Cup was presented to Blues captain Alex Pietrangelo by NHL commissioner Gary Bettman following the Blues 4–1 win over the Bruins in game seven.

The following Blues players and staff had their names engraved on the Stanley Cup:

2018–19 St. Louis Blues

=== Players ===
Centres

- 10 Brayden Schenn
- 15 Robby Fabbri*
- 17 Jaden Schwartz*
- 18 Robert Thomas*
- 21 Tyler Bozak
- 49 Ivan Barbashev*
- 70 Oskar Sundqvist
- 90 Ryan O'Reilly

Wingers

- 7 Patrick Maroon
- 9 Samuel Blais
- 12 Zach Sanford
- 20 Alexander Steen (A)
- 57 David Perron
- 91 Vladimir Tarasenko (A)

Defencemen

- 4 Carl Gunnarsson
- 6 Joel Edmundson
- 19 Jay Bouwmeester
- 27 Alex Pietrangelo (Captain)
- 29 Vince Dunn
- 41 Robert Bortuzzo
- 42 Michael Del Zotto †
- 55 Colton Parayko

Goaltenders

- 34 Jake Allen
- 50 Jordan Binnington
- * Played both centre and wing.
- † Exemption granted to engrave the name of a player who did not automatically qualify. (Note: Automatic qualification for a player's name to be engraved on the Stanley Cup: Playing in (for a goaltender, dressing for) at least one Stanley Cup Final game or at least half of regular season games for the Stanley Cup winning team.)

=== Coaching and administrative staff ===
- Tom Stillman (Chairman/Governor/Majority Owner), Chris Zimmerman (President/CEO of Business Operations/Alt. Governor), Doug Armstrong (President of Hockey Operations and General Manager/Alt. Governor)
- Dave Taylor (Vice President of Hockey Ops.), Al MacInnis (Senior Advisor to the General Manager), Bill Armstrong (Asst. General Manager/Director of Amateur Scouting), Craig Berube (Head Coach),
- Steve Ott (Asst. Coach), Mike Van Ryn (Asst. Coach), David Alexander (Goaltending Coach), Sean Ferrell (Video Coach)
- Larry Robinson (Senior Consultant of Hockey Ops./Asst. Coach), Rob DiMaio (Director of Player Personnel), Kevin McDonald (GM, San Antonio Rampage and Pro Scout), Tim Taylor (Director of Player Development)
- Ryan Miller (Director of Hockey Operations), Dan Ginnell (Amateur Scout), Tony Feltrin (Amateur Scout), Jan Vopat (Head of European Scouting)
- Ray Barile (Athletic Trainer), Dustin Flynn (Asst. Athletic Trainer), Joel Farnsworth (Equipment Manager)
- Rich Matthews (Asst. Equipment Manager), Andrew Dvorak (Equipment Assistant), Eric Renaghan (Strength & Conditioning Coach)
- Steve Squier (Massage Therapist), Rich Jankowski (Sr. Director of Team Services), Mike Caruso (Vice President, Media & Brand Communications)

=== Engraving notes ===
- #42 Michael Del Zotto (D) played in 7 regular season games for St. Louis, but was a healthy scratch for the entire playoffs. He previously played in 23 for Vancouver and later 12 regular season games for Anaheim before being acquired midseason by St. Louis. As he did not automatically qualify, St. Louis successfully requested an exemption to engrave his name.
- Six players were on the roster during the Final, but left off the Stanley Cup engraving due to not qualifying. None of them played in or dressed for the playoffs (they were healthy scratches). They were included in the team picture.
  - #62 Mackenzie MacEachern (LW) – 29 regular season games
  - #71 Jordan Nolan (C) – 14 regular season games (name engraved on the Stanley Cup for Los Angeles in 2012 and 2014)
  - #25 Chris Butler (D) – 13 regular season games
  - #22 Chris Thorburn (RW) – 1 regular season game
  - #35 Ville Husso (G) – 0 regular season games, 27 for San Antonio of the AHL
  - #39 Mitch Reinke (D) – 0 regular season games, 76 for San Antonio of the AHL

== Television and radio ==
In Canada, the series was broadcast by Sportsnet and CBC Television in English, and TVA Sports in French. In the U.S., the Final was split between NBC (Games 1, and 4 through 7) and NBCSN (Games 2 and 3).

In the United States, the seven-game series averaged 5.3 million viewers, the highest average since the six-game 2015 Stanley Cup Final. St. Louis had an average 28.7 rating, and Boston had an average 25.5. Game 7 had an average 8.7 million viewers, being the most watched NHL game in nearly 50 years.

== Notes ==
Preceded by Washington Capitals; 2018	St. Louis Blues; Stanley Cup champions 2019	Succeeded by Tampa Bay Lightning; 2020
