= Zach Sanford =

American ice hockey player (born 1994)

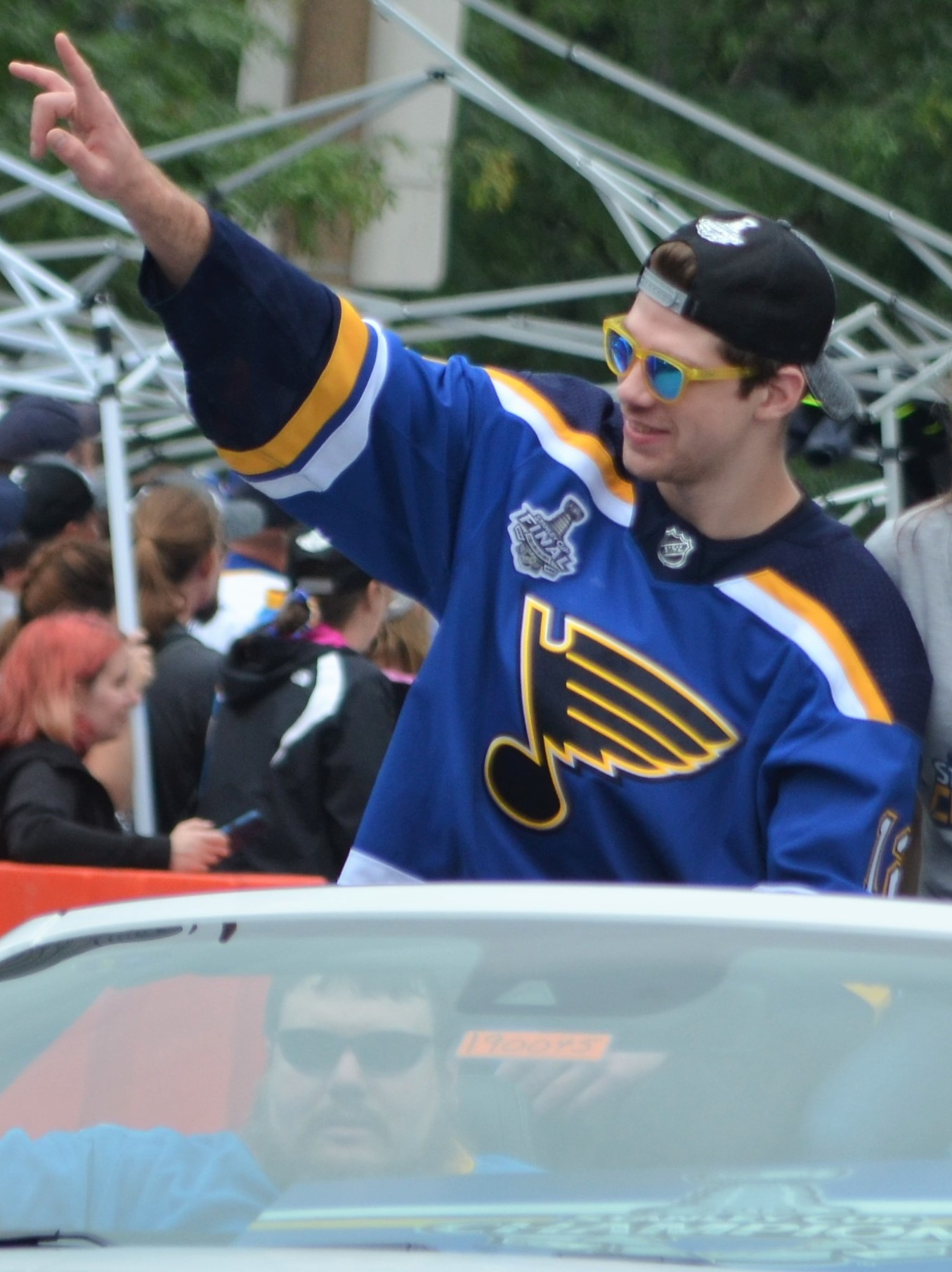
- Sanford with the St. Louis Blues in 2019
- Born: November 9, 1994 (age 32) Salem, Massachusetts, U.S.
- Height: 6 ft 4 in (193 cm)
- Weight: 203 lb (92 kg; 14 st 7 lb)
- Position: Left wing
- Shoots: Left
- NL team Former teams: HC Lugano; Washington Capitals; St. Louis Blues; Ottawa Senators; Winnipeg Jets; Nashville Predators; Arizona Coyotes; Chicago Blackhawks
- NHL draft: 61st overall, 2013; Washington Capitals
- Playing career: 2016–present

Zachary Michael Sanford (born November 9, 1994) is an American professional ice hockey forward for HC Lugano of the National League (NL). He was drafted 61st overall by the Washington Capitals at the 2013 NHL entry draft. Sanford won the Stanley Cup with the St. Louis Blues in 2019.

== Playing career ==
=== Early career ===
Sanford was born in Salem, Massachusetts before moving to Manchester, New Hampshire and attending Pinkerton Academy. During the 2011–12 season at Pinkerton, Sanford led the team to a Division 1 state title with 36 goals and 69 points. After earning the honor of New Hampshire High School Player of the Year, Sanford joined the Islanders Hockey Club of the Eastern Junior Hockey League (EJHL), recording 36 points in 37 games.

While with the Islanders, Sanford committed to play collegiate hockey for the Boston College Eagles men's ice hockey in Division I of the National Collegiate Athletic Association (NCAA) in March 2013. During his first year of NHL draft eligibility, Sanford started off ranking 83rd amongst North American skaters by the NHL Central Scouting Bureau but soon raised his rank to 60th overall. He was shortly thereafter picked in the 2013 NHL entry draft in the second round, 61st overall by the Washington Capitals. After being drafted 61st overall in the 2013 NHL entry draft by the Washington Capitals, Sanford joined the Waterloo Black Hawks of the United States Hockey League.

=== Collegiate ===
Sanford officially joined the Boston Eagles for the 2014–15 season where he scored 24 points in 38 games. He recorded his first collegiate goal on November 14 against Michigan State in a 3–2 win. He finished the season tied for fourth on the team with 17 assists. In his sophomore season with the Eagles in 2015–16, Sanford continued his offensive output and recorded 39 points in 40 games as the team qualified for the Frozen Four. On July 11, 2016, Sanford embarked on his professional career in signing a three-year, entry-level contract with the Washington Capitals.

=== Professional ===
==== Washington Capitals ====
After attending the Capitals training camp and having made an impact in the pre-season, Sanford made the Capitals opening night roster for the 2016–17 season. He made his NHL debut on October 13, 2016, against the defending Stanley Cup Champion Pittsburgh Penguins and had one shot on goal. After being sent down to American Hockey League (AHL) affiliate, the Hershey Bears, he was recalled up to the NHL on February 10. He scored his first career NHL goal on February 11, 2017, against the Anaheim Ducks. Sanford added another goal and assist in 26 games with the Capitals before he was traded to the St. Louis Blues as part of a package for defenseman Kevin Shattenkirk on February 27, 2017.

==== St. Louis Blues ====
Sanford scored his first goal as a Blue on March 16, 2017, against the San Jose Sharks in a 4–1 win. At the time of the trade, Sanford was being discussed as the future second or third line center in St. Louis. He finished the season with two goals and five points in thirteen games with the Blues after the trade.

At the beginning of the 2017–18 season, Sanford suffered a dislocated shoulder in training camp and underwent surgery. He was activated from the injured list on February 15, 2018, and reassigned to the Blues AHL affiliate, the San Antonio Rampage.

The following season, Sanford had a good training camp, but missed some time due to the death of his father. As a result, he started the 2018–19 season with San Antonio. He was recalled on October 16, 2018, after the Blues had been depleted by injuries. During a Blues practice on December 10, 2018, Sanford fought teammate Robert Bortuzzo. The two got a few punches in on one another before being separated by coaches. At the time, St. Louis had lost eight of their last 11 games. He was reassigned to San Antonio on December 15, 2018, but recalled just two days later. He was sent down again to San Antonio in December and recalled in January.

By January 2019, the Blues were in last place around the entire league resulting in a coaching and goaltender change. The changes proved to be successful as Sanford ended the regular season playing in 60 regular-season games and accumulating 20 points and the team qualified for the 2019 Stanley Cup playoffs. As the Blues met the Boston Bruins in the 2019 Stanley Cup Final, Sanford recorded his only goal of the postseason during game seven as the Blues earned their first Stanley Cup in their 52-year franchise history. Despite being a Stanley Cup winner, he was still unknown at this time as sports broadcasters were calling him irrelevant.

On July 9, 2019, Sanford signed a two-year extension with the Blues. During the 2019–20 season, Sanford achieved a rare four-goal performance in a 6–5 loss to the Vegas Golden Knights. It was also Sanford's first career hat trick and the first time a Blues' player scored four goals in a game in over five years. He also had a four points in a game on November 22, 2019 and a three-point game on February 26, 2020.

During the pandemic-shortened 2020–21 season, Sanford scored two goals in a 5–4 win over the Anaheim Ducks on March 2, 2021. He finished the season with 16 points in 52 games. On August 4, 2021, Sanford signed a one-year contract with the Blues.

==== Ottawa Senators and Winnipeg Jets ====
On September 25, 2021, Sanford was traded to the Ottawa Senators for forward Logan Brown and a conditional fourth-round pick. In 50 games with the Senators, he scored nine goals and seventeen points.

With the Senators out of playoff contention, and while in the last season of his contract, Sanford was traded to the Winnipeg Jets in exchange for a 2022 fifth-round pick at the NHL trade deadline on March 21, 2022. He played 30 games for Winnipeg, scoring four points. The Jets would ultimately miss the post-season.

==== Nashville Predators ====
As a free agent from the Jets, Sanford was signed to a one-year, $850,000 contract with the Nashville Predators on July 15, 2022. On November 22, 2022, the Predators placed Sanford on waivers. After clearing waivers, Sanford was assigned to the Predators AHL affiliate, the Milwaukee Admirals, the next day.

==== Arizona Coyotes ====
On July 14, 2023, Sanford signed a one-year, two-way contract with the Arizona Coyotes. Sanford failed to make the Coyotes roster out of training camp and was placed on waivers. He went unclaimed and was assigned to Arizona's AHL affiliate, the Tucson Roadrunners, to start the 2023–24 season. Sanford was recalled by Arizona on October 23 after injuries to Coyotes' forwards Jason Zucker and Michael Carcone. Sanford made his season debut for the Coyotes on October 27 versus the Los Angeles Kings, registering an assist. He was returned to Tucson on November 8. He was recalled again and played 11 games total with the Coyotes scoring two points (both assists). He was placed on waivers again on January 5.

==== Chicago Blackhawks ====
Sanford was claimed by the Chicago Blackhawks off waivers from the Coyotes on January 6, 2024. He made his Blackhawks debut in a 4–3 victory over the Calgary Flames on January 7, registering his first point with the team when he assisted on Colin Blackwell's game-winning goal in the third period. He played in 18 games with Chicago, marking four assists. On March 15, he was assigned to Chicago's AHL affiliate, the Rockford IceHogs, to make room for forward Lukas Reichel. He appeared in 13 games with Rockford, scoring three goals and six points.

On May 28, he signed a one-year, two-way contract with the Blackhawks. After going unclaimed on waivers, he was assigned to Rockford for the 2024–25 season.

==== HC Lugano ====
Following the completion of his contract and two-year tenure with the Blackhawks, Sanford left North America as a free agent and was signed to a one-year deal with Swiss club, HC Lugano of the NL, on August 25, 2025.

== Career statistics ==
			Regular season					Playoffs
Season	Team	League	GP	G	A	Pts	PIM	GP	G	A	Pts	PIM
2009–10	Pinkerton Academy	USHS	23	14	11	25	48	—	—	—	—	—
2010–11	Pinkerton Academy	USHS	21	15	16	31	39	—	—	—	—	—
2011–12	Pinkerton Academy	USHS	21	36	33	69	40	—	—	—	—	—
2012–13	Islanders Hockey Club	EJHL	37	12	24	36	22	7	4	4	8	8
2013–14	Waterloo Black Hawks	USHL	52	17	18	35	60	12	5	7	12	8
2014–15	Boston College	HE	38	7	17	24	30	—	—	—	—	—
2015–16	Boston College	HE	41	13	26	39	44	—	—	—	—	—
2016–17	Washington Capitals	NHL	26	2	1	3	6	—	—	—	—	—
2016–17	Hershey Bears	AHL	25	11	5	16	14	—	—	—	—	—
2016–17	St. Louis Blues	NHL	13	2	3	5	4	4	0	0	0	0
2016–17	Chicago Wolves	AHL	—	—	—	—	—	2	0	0	0	0
2017–18	San Antonio Rampage	AHL	20	4	3	7	18	—	—	—	—	—
2018–19	San Antonio Rampage	AHL	7	4	2	6	2	—	—	—	—	—
2018–19	St. Louis Blues	NHL	60	8	12	20	21	8	1	3	4	0
2019–20	St. Louis Blues	NHL	58	16	14	30	28	9	1	3	4	17
2020–21	St. Louis Blues	NHL	52	10	6	16	25	4	0	0	0	0
2021–22	Ottawa Senators	NHL	62	9	8	17	37	—	—	—	—	—
2021–22	Winnipeg Jets	NHL	18	0	4	4	13	—	—	—	—	—
2022–23	Nashville Predators	NHL	16	2	1	3	4	—	—	—	—	—
2022–23	Milwaukee Admirals	AHL	45	12	16	28	51	16	3	4	7	10
2023–24	Tucson Roadrunners	AHL	16	1	3	4	19	—	—	—	—	—
2023–24	Arizona Coyotes	NHL	11	0	2	2	4	—	—	—	—	—
2023–24	Chicago Blackhawks	NHL	18	0	4	4	2	—	—	—	—	—
2023–24	Rockford IceHogs	AHL	13	3	3	6	6	4	2	2	4	0
2024–25	Rockford IceHogs	AHL	70	19	24	43	60	7	3	5	8	4
NHL totals			334	49	55	104	144	25	2	6	8	17

== Awards and honors ==
Award	Year
NHL
Stanley Cup champion	2019
