= Tyler Bozak =

Canadian ice hockey player (born 1986)

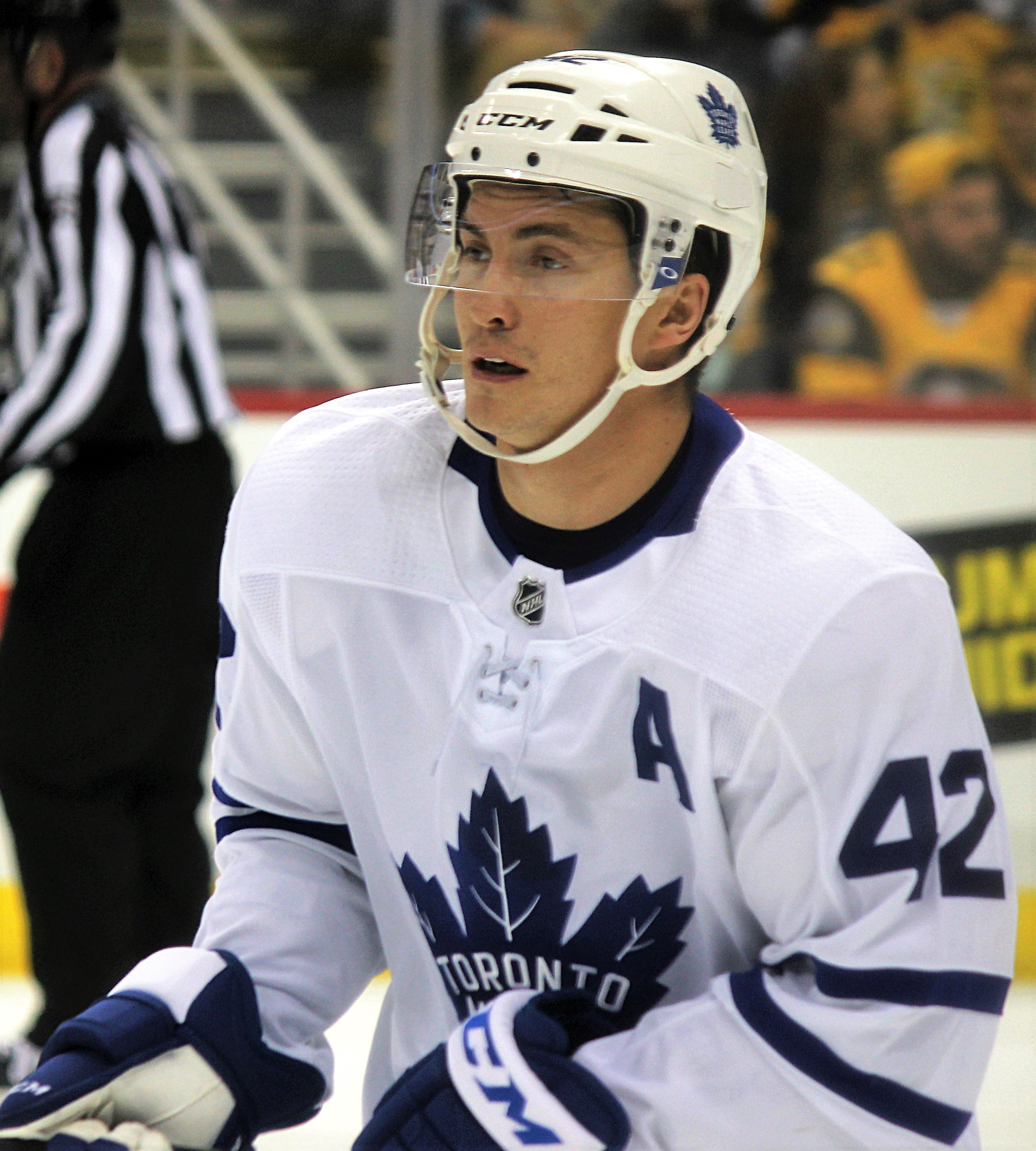
- Bozak with the Toronto Maple Leafs in December 2017
- Born: March 19, 1986 (age 40) Regina, Saskatchewan, Canada
- Height: 6 ft 1 in (185 cm)
- Weight: 195 lb (88 kg; 13 st 13 lb)
- Position: Centre
- Shot: Right
- Played for: Toronto Maple Leafs; St. Louis Blues
- NHL draft: Undrafted
- Playing career: 2009–2022

Tyler Bozak (born March 19, 1986) is a Canadian former professional ice hockey centre. He played for the Toronto Maple Leafs and the St. Louis Blues in the National Hockey League (NHL). Prior to being signed by the Maple Leafs as a free agent, Bozak had played two seasons at the University of Denver in the National Collegiate Athletic Association (NCAA). In 2018, after nine seasons with the Maple Leafs, Bozak signed with the Blues in free agency. In his first season with the Blues, Bozak won the Stanley Cup, defeating the Boston Bruins in 2019.

== Playing career ==
=== Amateur ===
Bozak started playing in the British Columbia Hockey League (BCHL) for the Victoria Salsa in the 2004–05 season, after unsuccessful training camps at the top tier junior league, the Western Hockey League (WHL) level. He spent three seasons in the BCHL with the Victoria franchise. In his final season, Bozak recorded 128 points (45 goals and 83 assists), and was awarded the Brett Hull Trophy as the BCHL's top scorer.

On December 11, 2006, the University of Denver Pioneers announced that Bozak had signed a letter of intent to play hockey for the school. He joined the Pioneers for the 2007–08 season. During his freshman year with the team, Bozak played in all 41 games and led the team in scoring with 34 points (18 goals and 16 assists). He was second in the country with five shorthanded goals. During the season, Bozak was named the Red Baron Western Collegiate Hockey Association (WCHA) Rookie of the Week four times and was named the Hockey Commissioner's Association (HCA) Rookie of the Month for December. At the end of the season, Bozak was named to the All-WCHA third team and to the All-WCHA Rookie Team.

Heading into his sophomore season with the Pioneers, Bozak was named to the College Hockey News Preseason All-America Team. On December 12, he tore the meniscus in his left knee in a game against the Minnesota State Mavericks, causing him to miss more than half of the Pioneers' season. After the season, Bozak was named to the All-WCHA Academic Team.

=== Professional (2009–2022) ===
==== Toronto Maple Leafs (2009–2018) ====
After his sophomore season, Bozak was a heavily pursued free agent despite never being drafted by an NHL team. On April 3, 2009, he signed a two-year, entry-level contract with the Toronto Maple Leafs. Exact financial details of the contract were not released, but it has been rumoured to be worth close to $4 million per season if all performance bonuses were to be reached. After signing, Bozak did not play for the Leafs during the remainder of the 2008–09 season, instead taking the time to further rehabilitate his injured knee.

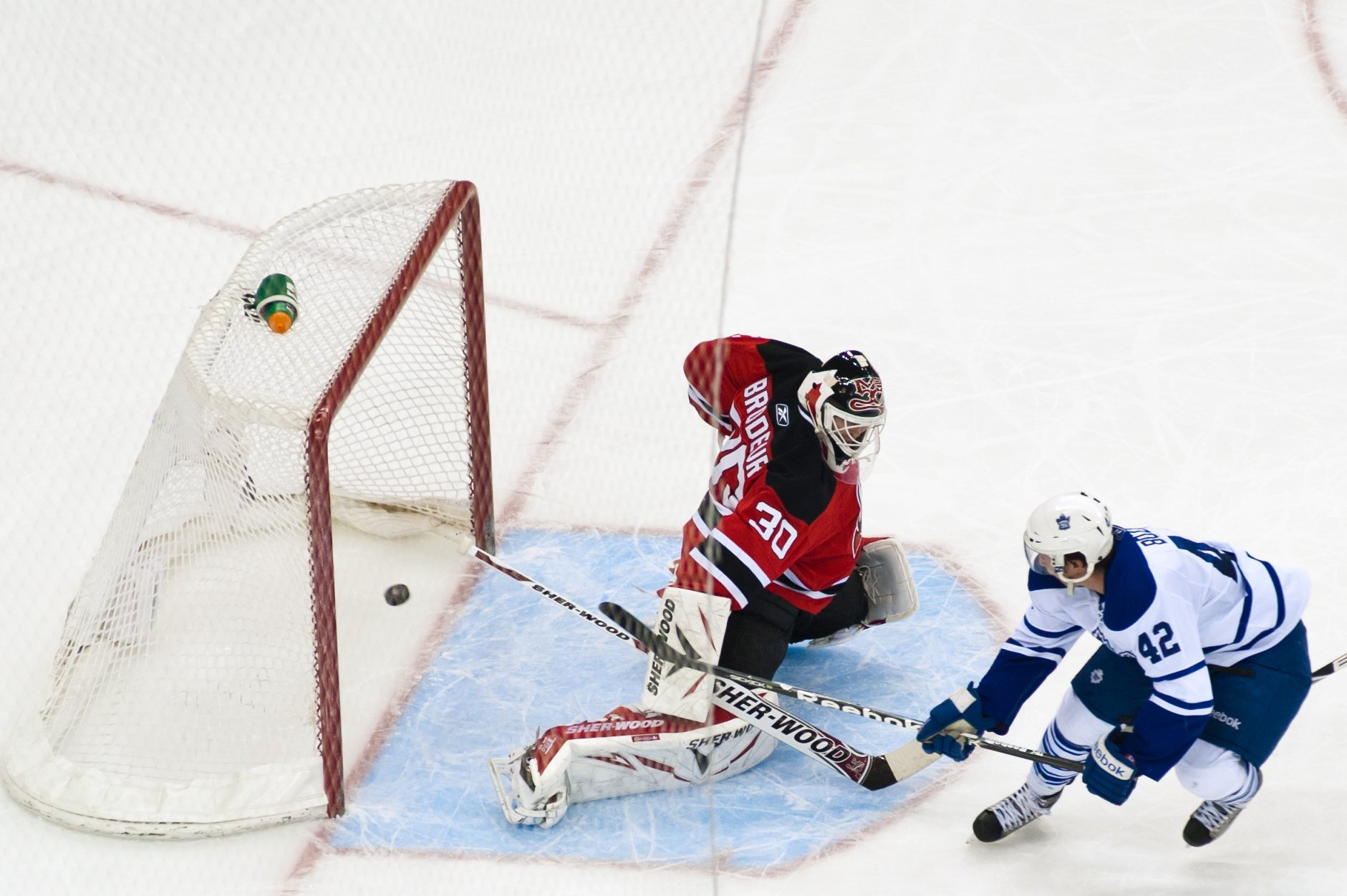
Bozak beats Martin Brodeur in a game in April 2011.

Bozak attended the Maple Leafs' training camp prior to the 2009–10 season. He had a strong training camp, though due to salary cap constraints, he was sent down to the Leafs' American Hockey League (AHL) affiliate, the Toronto Marlies. Then-Maple Leafs head coach Ron Wilson admitted that Bozak indeed had a strong camp, stating, "He'll probably have to go down because of numbers. Based on the way he played in training camp, he's certainly worthy of playing in the NHL, but we may not have room at the beginning." Bozak was eventually recalled on October 13, 2009, and made his NHL debut the same night against the Colorado Avalanche. During the game, he recorded his first NHL point, an assist on a goal scored by defenceman François Beauchemin. After playing one game for Toronto, Bozak was returned to the Marlies on October 15. Later in the season, on January 12, 2010, he was again called by the Maple Leafs, where two days later, on January 14, he scored his first career NHL goal in a 4–0 victory over the Philadelphia Flyers.

Bozak had his first career two-goal game on January 1, 2011, against the Ottawa Senators as part of a 5–1 win.

In the following off-season, on July 5, he then agreed to terms on a two-year contract extension with the Maple Leafs.

On July 5, 2013, he signed a five-year, $21 million contract extension with Toronto.

On March 28, 2015, towards the conclusion of the 2014–15 season, Bozak scored his first career NHL hat-trick, as well as recording one assist to cap off a four-point performance, contributing to all four Toronto goals. Bozak would finish the season with a career-high 23 goals while tying his career-high of 49 total points. During the season, future superstar Connor McDavid, who was drafted in June 2015, stated that Bozak was his most comparable player due to the centre's good skating and "pass first" mentality.

The 2015 off-season saw the Maple Leafs trade away star winger Phil Kessel to the Pittsburgh Penguins. Bozak had spent much of his NHL career playing on a line with Kessel, and many fans and media outlets predicted that Bozak's offensive production would decline significantly in his absence, with some even saying Bozak's point totals would resemble bottom line players (Bozak had spent most of his career on Toronto's top line). To the surprise of many, Bozak experienced career years following Kessel's departure, scoring at a pace much higher than predicted, and remaining on Toronto's top two lines. In an ironic turn of events, both Bozak and James van Riemsdyk (who also shared top line duties since joining the team) had more points and better analytics than Kessel at the Christmas break. After the holiday hiatus concluded, Bozak was named one of the NHL's three stars of the week for the period of December 21–28. Bozak had five points in this three-game span, also scoring his second career hat-trick en route in a 7–4 win over the Avalanche on December 21.

The following season, 2016–17, Bozak scored a career-high 55 points on a line with van Riemsdyk and rookie Mitch Marner, helping the team make the playoffs for the second time in his career.

==== St. Louis Blues (2018–2022) ====
After nine seasons with the Maple Leafs, Bozak left the club as a free agent, signing a three-year, $15 million contract with the St. Louis Blues on July 1, 2018. Bozak won a Stanley Cup with the Blues on June 12, 2019.

On September 14, 2021, Bozak re-signed with the Blues on a one-year, $750,000 contract.

== Personal life ==
Bozak's parents are Mitch and Karon, and he has one brother, Justin. He graduated from Sheldon-Williams Collegiate in Regina, Saskatchewan. While in high school, he volunteered for the Raise a Reader program and was on the honour roll all three years. While at the University of Denver, Bozak majored in business.

Bozak is a Ukrainian-Canadian. (Note: In an interview with The Score, Bozak said his favourite food was perogies, and when asked, stated that he is Ukrainian (and jokingly agreed to have his birthplace set to Ukraine in his biography).)

Bozak is married to Molly Robinson. The couple were married on July 22, 2017, and have three children together.

== Career statistics ==
			Regular season					Playoffs
Season	Team	League	GP	G	A	Pts	PIM	GP	G	A	Pts	PIM
2004–05	Regina Pat Canadians	SHA	42	17	19	36	40	—	—	—	—	—
2004–05	Victoria Salsa	BCHL	55	15	16	31	24	—	—	—	—	—
2005–06	Victoria Salsa	BCHL	56	31	38	69	26	—	—	—	—	—
2006–07	Victoria Grizzlies	BCHL	59	45	83	128	45	—	—	—	—	—
2007–08	University of Denver	WCHA	41	18	16	34	22	—	—	—	—	—
2008–09	University of Denver	WCHA	19	8	15	23	10	—	—	—	—	—
2009–10	Toronto Marlies	AHL	32	4	16	20	6	—	—	—	—	—
2009–10	Toronto Maple Leafs	NHL	37	8	19	27	6	—	—	—	—	—
2010–11	Toronto Maple Leafs	NHL	82	15	17	32	14	—	—	—	—	—
2011–12	Toronto Maple Leafs	NHL	73	18	29	47	22	—	—	—	—	—
2012–13	Toronto Maple Leafs	NHL	46	12	16	28	6	5	1	1	2	4
2013–14	Toronto Maple Leafs	NHL	58	19	30	49	14	—	—	—	—	—
2014–15	Toronto Maple Leafs	NHL	82	23	26	49	44	—	—	—	—	—
2015–16	Toronto Maple Leafs	NHL	57	12	23	35	18	—	—	—	—	—
2016–17	Toronto Maple Leafs	NHL	78	18	37	55	30	6	2	2	4	4
2017–18	Toronto Maple Leafs	NHL	81	11	32	43	28	7	2	2	4	6
2018–19	St. Louis Blues	NHL	72	13	25	38	20	26	5	8	13	8
2019–20	St. Louis Blues	NHL	67	13	16	29	10	8	0	2	2	2
2020–21	St. Louis Blues	NHL	31	5	12	17	10	4	1	1	2	0
2021–22	St. Louis Blues	NHL	50	3	9	12	14	12	2	0	2	0
NHL totals			814	170	291	461	236	68	13	16	29	24

== Awards ==
=== Junior ===
Award	Date
Brett Hull Trophy as BCHL Top Scorer	2006–07 season

=== NCAA ===
Award	Date
Red Baron WCHA Rookie of the Week	November 6, 2007; December 18, 2007; January 2, 2008; February 12, 2008
HCA Rookie of the Month	December 2007
All-WCHA Third Team	2007–08
All-WCHA Rookie Team	2007–08
All-WCHA Academic Team	2008–09

=== NHL ===
Award	Date
Stanley Cup champion	2019
