= Connor Clifton =

American ice hockey player (born 1995)

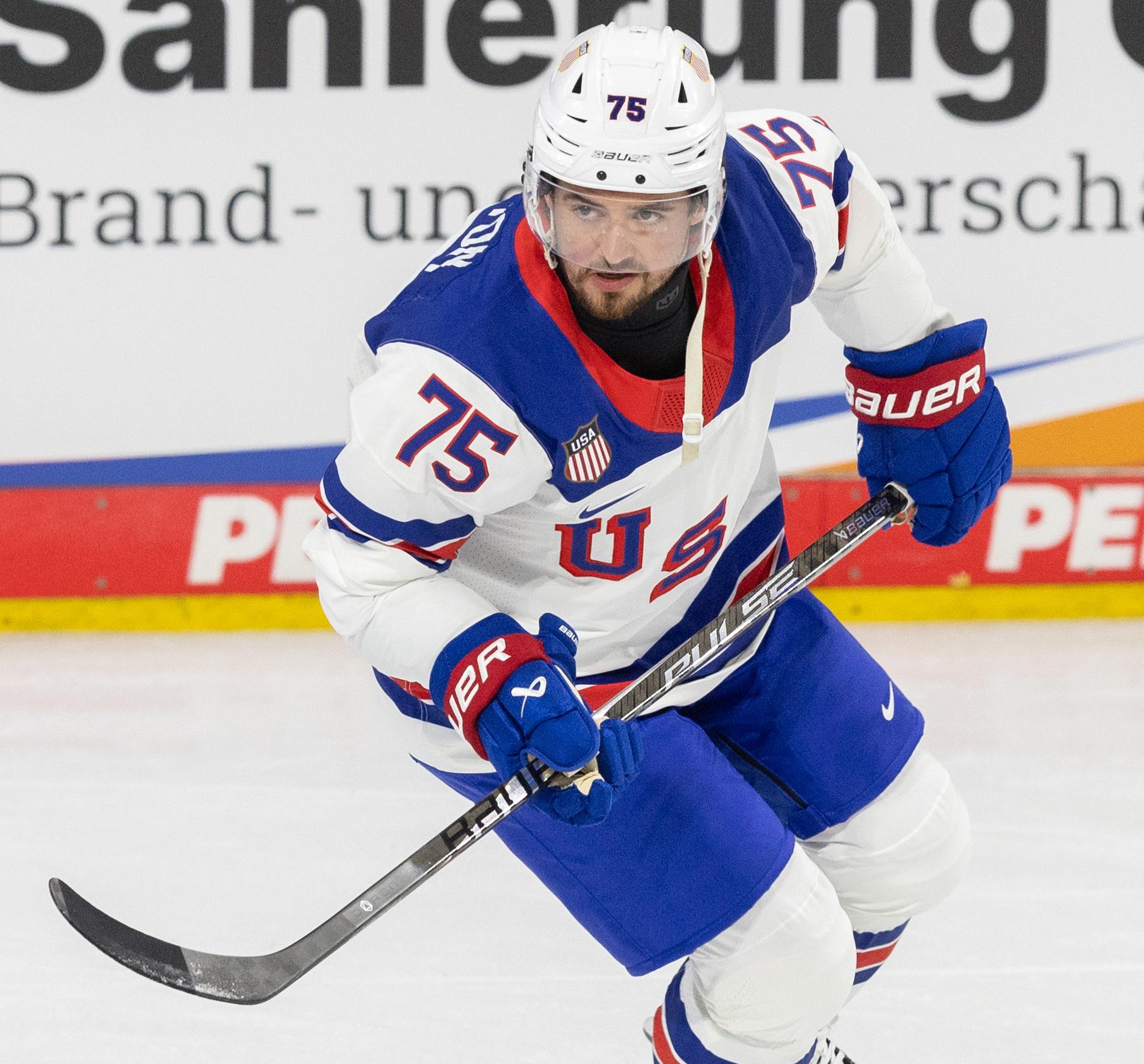
- Clifton in 2026
- Born: April 28, 1995 (age 31) Long Branch, New Jersey, U.S.
- Height: 6 ft 0 in (183 cm)
- Weight: 196 lb (89 kg; 14 st 0 lb)
- Position: Defense
- Shoots: Right
- NHL team Former teams: Boston Bruins; Buffalo Sabres; Pittsburgh Penguins
- National team: United States
- NHL draft: 133rd overall, 2013; Phoenix Coyotes
- Playing career: 2017–present

Connor Michael Clifton (born April 28, 1995) is an American professional ice hockey player who is a defenseman for the Boston Bruins of the National Hockey League (NHL). He played college ice hockey with Quinnipiac University.

== Playing career ==
Born in Long Branch, New Jersey and raised in Matawan, New Jersey, Clifton played prep hockey at Christian Brothers Academy together with his brother, Tim. Having played in his draft eligible year within the U.S. National Development Team Program where the team won silver in the 2013 IIHF World Under-18 Championship, Clifton was originally drafted by the Phoenix Coyotes in the fifth round, 133rd overall, of the 2013 NHL entry draft.

Clifton began his freshman season at Quinnipiac University during the 2013–14 season. He was named to the ECAC Hockey All-Academic Team during all four seasons with the Quinnipiac Bobcats. In his junior season, Clifton was named captain of the Bobcats and at the conclusion of the season was named to the ECAC Hockey All-Tournament, NCAA East All-Frozen Four Team, and honored ECAC Hockey Most Outstanding Player in Tournament.

=== Professional ===
==== Boston Bruins ====
In 2017, after failing to reach an agreement with the Arizona Coyotes, Clifton signed with the Providence Bruins of the American Hockey League (AHL), where he played 54 games.

Clifton was signed to a two year entry-level NHL contract by the Boston Bruins on May 3, 2018. He began the 2018–19 season in Providence, and made his NHL debut on November 16, 2018, against the Dallas Stars, after being recalled on an emergency basis.

On March 23, 2019, Clifton registered his first NHL point with an assist on a Noel Acciari's goal, in a 7–3 win over the Florida Panthers. He scored his first NHL goal in Game 2 of that year's Eastern Conference Final against the Carolina Hurricanes, as part of a 6–2 rout. The Bruins would later advance to the Stanley Cup Finals, but would lose to the St. Louis Blues in seven games. He would earn the nickname "Cliffy Hockey" during his time with the Bruins.

On July 1, 2019, Clifton signed a three-year, $3 million contract extension to remain with the Bruins.

Clifton's play the previous season earned him a spot on the opening night roster for the Bruins to start the 2019–20 season. Clifton was a regular fixture on the third defense pairing for the Bruins until the season was suddenly postponed due to the COVID-19 pandemic, registering two goals in 33 games. He would play in eight postseason games for the Bruins, scoring a goal and two assists before the Bruins were eliminated in the second round by the eventual Stanley Cup champion Tampa Bay Lightning.

Solidifying himself as an NHL defensemen, Clifton would play in 44 games for the Bruins in the shortened 2020–21 season, scoring a goal and six assists for seven points. He would continue being a solid presence for the Bruins the following season, scoring two goals and eight assists in 60 games.

==== Buffalo Sabres ====
On July 1, 2023, Clifton left the Bruins as a free agent and was signed to a three-year, $9.99 million contract with the Buffalo Sabres. On October 27, 2023, Clifton delivered an illegal check to the head on New Jersey Devils captain Nico Hischier, who was injured on the play. Clifton was assessed a match penalty, and following a league hearing was suspended for two games.

==== Pittsburgh Penguins ====
On June 28, 2025, Clifton, and the 39th pick in the 2025 NHL entry draft, was traded to the Pittsburgh Penguins in exchange for Conor Timmins and Issac Belliveau. In the 2025–26 season, Clifton appeared in 50 games on the blueline with the Penguins recording 2 goals and 4 assists for 6 points in a third-pairing role.

==== Return to Boston ====
On July 1, 2026, as a free agent, Clifton returned to the Bruins organization in signing a two-year, $4.5 million contract.

== Personal life ==
Clifton married his wife, Amanda Thompson, in August 2021. Their daughter was born in June 2024.

== Career statistics ==
=== Regular season and playoffs ===
			Regular season					Playoffs
Season	Team	League	GP	G	A	Pts	PIM	GP	G	A	Pts	PIM
2009–10	New Jersey Hitmen	EmJHL	33	2	10	12	59	3	0	0	0	2
2010–11	New Jersey Hitmen	EmJHL	36	4	14	18	95	7	2	2	4	10
2011–12	New Jersey Hitmen	EmJHL	4	0	1	1	0	—	—	—	—	—
2011–12	New Jersey Hitmen	EJHL	28	1	11	12	46	6	0	3	3	15
2011–12	U.S. NTDP Juniors	USHL	8	1	0	1	16	—	—	—	—	—
2011–12	U.S. NTDP U17	USDP	12	1	1	2	24	—	—	—	—	—
2012–13	U.S. NTDP Juniors	USHL	25	3	6	9	90	—	—	—	—	—
2012–13	U.S. NTDP U18	USDP	66	8	15	23	114	—	—	—	—	—
2013–14	Quinnipiac University	ECAC	36	5	4	9	106	—	—	—	—	—
2014–15	Quinnipiac University	ECAC	38	0	5	5	54	—	—	—	—	—
2015–16	Quinnipiac University	ECAC	43	7	21	28	42	—	—	—	—	—
2016–17	Quinnipiac University	ECAC	39	7	7	14	82	—	—	—	—	—
2017–18	Providence Bruins	AHL	54	4	9	13	35	4	0	0	0	2
2018–19	Providence Bruins	AHL	53	6	21	27	52	—	—	—	—	—
2018–19	Boston Bruins	NHL	19	0	1	1	15	18	2	3	5	16
2019–20	Boston Bruins	NHL	31	2	0	2	12	8	1	2	3	6
2019–20	Providence Bruins	AHL	2	0	0	0	0	—	—	—	—	—
2020–21	Boston Bruins	NHL	44	1	6	7	38	10	0	0	0	2
2021–22	Boston Bruins	NHL	60	2	8	10	32	7	1	1	2	8
2022–23	Boston Bruins	NHL	78	5	18	23	60	3	0	0	0	2
2023–24	Buffalo Sabres	NHL	79	4	14	18	88	—	—	—	—	—
2024–25	Buffalo Sabres	NHL	73	1	15	16	45	—	—	—	—	—
2025–26	Pittsburgh Penguins	NHL	50	2	4	6	53	3	0	0	0	0
NHL totals			434	17	66	83	343	49	4	6	10	34

=== International ===
Year	Team	Event	Result	GP	G	A	Pts	PIM
2012	United States	IH18	7th	3	0	0	0	2
2013	United States	U18	2nd place, silver medalist(s)	7	1	0	1	2
2026	United States	WC	8th	8	1	0	1	4
Junior totals				10	1	0	1	4
Senior totals				8	1	0	1	4

== Awards and honors ==
Award	Year
College
ECAC All-Tournament Team	2016
ECAC Tournament MOP	2016
NCAA All-Tournament Team	2016
