= Ron Poster =

Organist

Ron Poster is an American musician known for being the official organist for the Boston Bruins, a position he has held since 2001. Poster also played organ for all Boston Celtics home games from 2011 to 2013. As a stadium organist, Poster prides himself on being able to play the right song at the right time in a fast-moving game, and being knowledgeable about current popular music. Like other stadium organists, Poster uses social media to interact with fans in real time.

Poster got the job working for the Bruins after meeting their team’s director of game presentation at an event where he was working as a public address announcer in 2000. They talked about hockey for a while and Poster showed him what he could do on the organ. The next year, he was invited to audition before Bruins management and he was hired. His organ is located in the upper levels of TD Garden, six stories above the actual rink.

Poster attended the Berklee College of Music. He has played in a wide variety of situations including as an accompanist to dancers at the Boston Conservatory, being the music director for a popular dinner boat in Boston, and playing for events at Boston's Museum of Fine Arts. He also has had regular weekly gigs in Boston, playing at Les Zygomates Bistro and with Ron Poster & The Sinatra Ambassadors at Lucky’s Lounge, while also performing with his band, the Ronnie Ron Trio.
