= Carl Gunnarsson =

Swedish ice hockey player

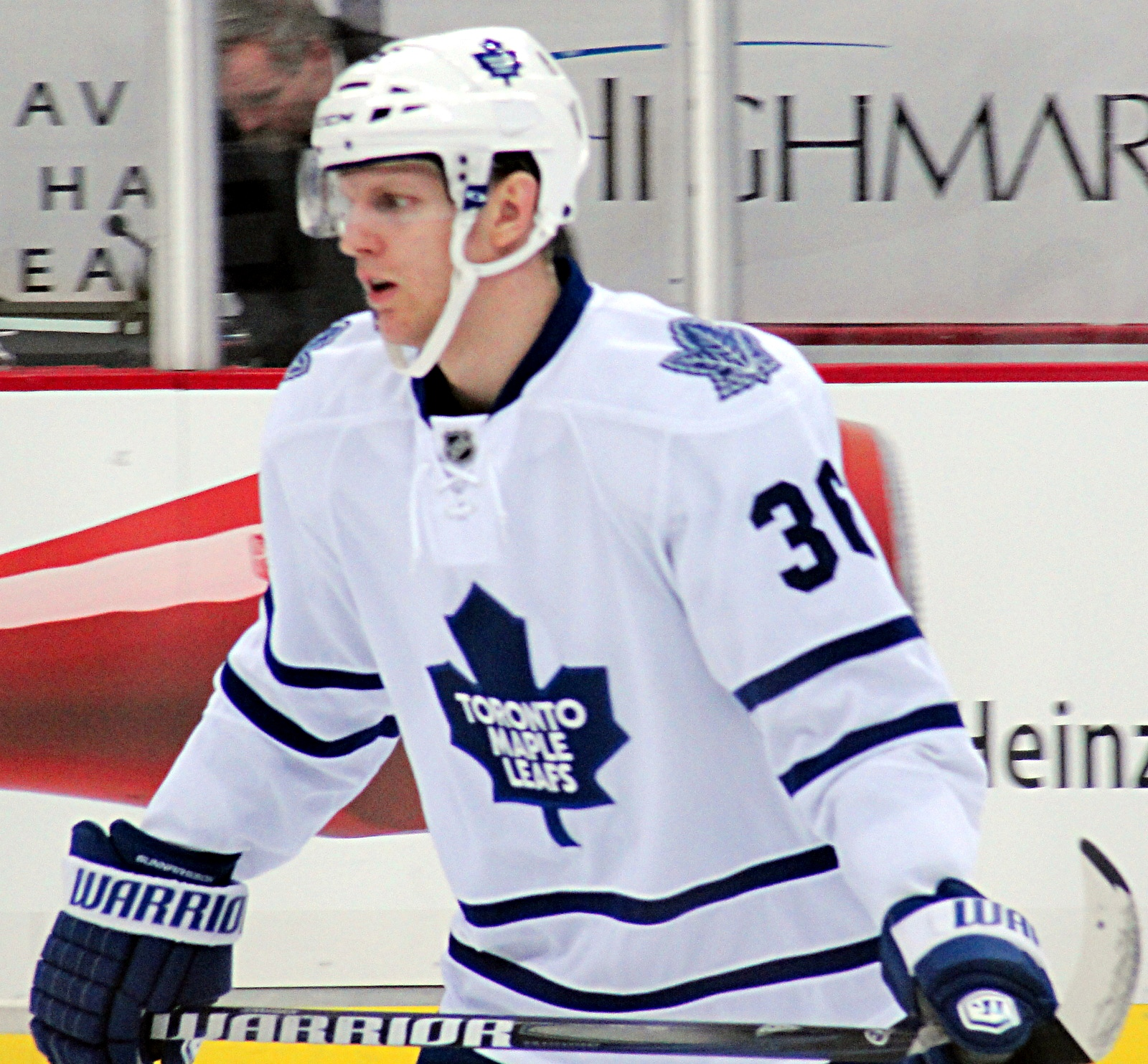
- Gunnarsson with the Toronto Maple Leafs in 2012
- Born: 9 November 1986 (age 40) Örebro, Sweden
- Height: 6 ft 2 in (188 cm)
- Weight: 189 lb (86 kg; 13 st 7 lb)
- Position: Defence
- Shot: Left
- Played for: Linköpings HC; Toronto Maple Leafs; St. Louis Blues
- National team: Sweden
- NHL draft: 194th overall, 2007; Toronto Maple Leafs
- Playing career: 2005–2021

Carl Gunnarsson (born 9 November 1986) is a Swedish former professional ice hockey player. A defenceman, he played for Linköpings HC of the Elitserien (SEL) and the Toronto Maple Leafs and St. Louis Blues of the National Hockey League (NHL).

A native of Sweden, Gunnarsson began his minor ice hockey career with the Örebro HK and Linköpings HC junior teams before being selected in the seventh round, 194th overall, of the 2007 NHL entry draft by the Toronto Maple Leafs. Prior to playing in North America, Gunnarsson returned to Sweden and played for Linköpings HC of the Swedish Elite League. He returned to Canada for the 2009–10 season and made his NHL debut 14 November. Gunnarsson played five seasons with the Leafs before being traded to the St. Louis Blues on 28 June 2014. Gunnarsson won the Stanley Cup as a member of the Blues in 2019.

Internationally, Gunnarsson has played for Team Sweden at both the junior and senior levels. He has participated in three IIHF World Championships, capturing one silver and two bronze medals.

== Playing career ==
=== Sweden ===
Gunnarsson was born on 9 November 1986, in Örebro, Sweden, to father Björn Gunnarsson. Growing up in Sweden, Gunnarsson began his minor ice hockey career with the Örebro HK and Linköpings HC junior teams. In 2003, he was named the years best talent by Klubb i Örebro län, a sports journalism newspaper. Gunnarsson made his HockeyAllsvenskan debut during the 2003–04 season before eventually playing in the Swedish Elite League for Linköpings HC. In his first season with the Senior hockey club, Gunnarsson was loaned to the IFK Arboga where he scored his first goal on 2 November 2005. During his tenure with Linköpings HC, Gunnarsson helped the team earn back-to-back SHL SM-silver Medal.

=== Toronto Maple Leafs ===
Gunnarsson was selected in the seventh round, 194th overall, in the 2007 NHL entry draft by the Toronto Maple Leafs but chose to continue playing in the Swedish Elite League for Linköpings HC. He ended the season with 16 points in 53 games and on 2 June 2009, began his North American professional career by signing an entry-level contract with the Maple Leafs. He attended the Maple Leafs Rookie Camp in September and was assigned to their American Hockey League (AHL) affiliate, the Toronto Marlies, to begin the 2009–10 season. His stint in the AHL was shortlived as he was called up to the Maple Leafs as a replacement for Mike Komisarek on 12 November. He made his NHL debut on 14 November in a loss to the Calgary Flames, during which he played more than 21 minutes of ice time and was praised by coach Ron Wilson as looking like the Leafs' best defenceman. Gunnarsson stayed with the Leafs for the remainder of the season and scored his first NHL goal on 29 January 2010 against Martin Brodeur of the New Jersey Devils.

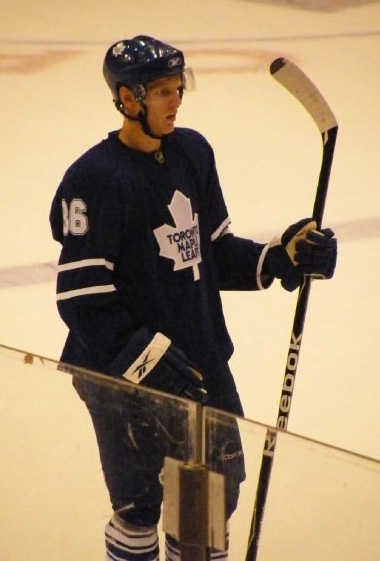
Gunnarson during his tenure with the Maple Leafs in 2009

Following a successful rookie season, Gunnarsson made the Leafs opening lineup prior to the 2010–11 season. However, Gunnarsson's second season in the NHL did not begin as smoothly as his first; he was a healthy scratch 13 times throughout the season and did not play more than 20-minutes of ice time until his 17th game of the season. His play began to pick up through the final 24 games of the season and he ended the year with four goals and 20 points in 68 games. Gunnarsson was rewarded for his success with a two-year contract extension on 14 June 2011.

Entering the first year of his new contract, Gunnarsson competed for a spot on the Maple Leafs roster against nine other defencemen. The Leafs leaned heavily on Gunnarsson during the 2011–12 season, with only captain Dion Phaneuf logging more time on ice. During practice on 12 February 2012, Gunnarsson collided with teammate Jay Rosehill and he missed three games to recover from the subsequent ankle injury. He returned to the Leafs lineup only to suffer a season-ending separated shoulder injury during the teams' final home game against the Buffalo Sabres on 4 April.

Due to the 2012–13 NHL lockout, Gunnarsson was released by the Leafs in order to play out the season with his hometown team Örebro HK. After the lockout ended, Gunnarsson returned to North America and continued the season with the Toronto Maple Leafs. However, his time in the lineup was shortlived as he underwent treatment to rehabilitate a hip injury after playing in seven games. Gunnarsson was cleared to play for the Leafs prior to the 2013–14 season and made their opening lineup. That season would prove to be his last with the Maple Leafs, as on 28 June 2014, Gunnarsson and fourth-round draft pick in the 2014 NHL entry draft were traded to the St. Louis Blues in exchange for defenceman Roman Polák. He underwent hip surgery during the offseason and was medically cleared to play on 14 October 2014.

=== St. Louis Blues ===
Gunnarsson joined the Blues for their 2014–15 season and made their opening night lineup. He played in 20 games for the Blues before being placed on their injured reserve and missing 10 games due to an upper-body injury. By the time he met the Leafs for the first time of the season, he was playing on a defensive pairing with Kevin Shattenkirk and helped the Blues maintain a 16-4-2 home record. He was re-injured during a game against the Minnesota Wild on 21 March 2015 and returned to the lineup on 25 March. At the time of his injury, Gunnarsson accumulated two goals and 10 assists in 54 games.

Gunnarsson joined the Blues in the final year of his contract during their 2015–16 season and made their opening night lineup. However, he missed numerous games throughout the season due to the various injuries. At the beginning of the season, during a game against the New York Rangers on 16 October, Gunnarsson, Kyle Brodziak, and Jori Lehtera all sustained lower-body injuries. He eventually returned to the lineup for the remainder of the year until 10 January 2016, when he suffered an undisclosed injury during a game against the Los Angeles Kings. Upon returning to the lineup, he played a crucial role in securing the Blues' playoff qualification by scoring in their win over the Vancouver Canucks. However, during that game on March 25, he suffered another lower-body injury and missed three more games. During the 2015–16 season, he signed a three-year contract to stay with the Blues.

In the first year of his contract, Gunnarsson set a career-low in the NHL with six points and again suffered from various injuries during the season. He sat as a healthy scratch during the Blues' season opener against the Chicago Blackhawks and missed the next two games due an upper body injury. After playing in 23 games for the Blues, Gunnarsson endured a lower-body injury on 9 December 2016 and was listed as day-to-day. When he returned to the lineup, Gunnarsson never played in more than four consecutive games until 26 February, when Kevin Shattenkirk was traded and he was forced into a deeper role. Overall, he skated in 56 games and recorded a career-low six points, while also playing an average of 13:36 per game. On 18 June 2017, the Blues left Gunnarsson unprotected to the 2017 NHL expansion draft for the Vegas Golden Knights, but David Perron was chosen instead.

Early on in the 2017–18 season, Gunnarsson missed one game due to the birth of his first child but returned to the lineup on 27 October 2017. He also sat as a healthy scratch for four consecutive games before returning to the Blues' lineup on 1 December 2017. Gunnarsson played 68 games with the Blues during the 2017–18 season before suffering a season-ending ACL tear, forcing him to miss six months in order to recover. As the Blues ended the season with a 44–32–6 record, they were eliminated from the 2018 Stanley Cup playoffs contention after a 5–2 loss to the Colorado Avalanche.

Gunnarsson was unavailable to the Blues for their 2018–19 season opener against the Winnipeg Jets due to injuries. When he was medically cleared to play, he was re-assigned to the Blues' AHL affiliate, the San Antonio Rampage, on 25 October for a conditioning assignment. He played two games in the AHL before being recalled to the NHL on 29 October alongside Robby Fabbri, Nikita Soshnikov, and Ville Husso. By 2 January 2019, the Blues were in last place around the entire league resulting in a coaching and goaltender change. Gunnarsson recorded seven points in 25 games to help them qualify for the 2019 Stanley Cup Final. After losing in game one of the Finals, the Blues and Boston Bruins needed overtime to decide the winner of game two. During intermission prior to overtime, Gunnarsson approached coach Craig Berube at the urinal and told him he just needed "one more shot," after hitting the crossbar in the third period. The coach agreed and Gunnarsson scored the overtime game-winning goal in game two to even the series against the Bruins. This was the first time that the Blues had won a game in the Stanley Cup Finals. The Blues eventually defeated the Bruins in seven games to win their first Stanley Cup in franchise history, ending a 52-year drought. On 27 June 2019, Gunnarsson was signed to a two-year $3.5 million contract extension to remain with the Blues.

Gunnarsson played the entirety of shortened 2019–20 season, which was cut short due to the COVID-19 pandemic. He suffered an upper-body injury on 12 December during a game against the Vegas Golden Knights and missed 15 games to recover. Gunnarsson concluded the regular season recording seven points in 36 games.

On 22 February 2021, Gunnarsson suffered a knee injury in a game against the Los Angeles Kings. The following day, it was announced that he would miss the remainder of the 2020–21 season. On 23 June, Gunnarsson announced his retirement.

== International play ==
Medal record

Representing Sweden

Ice hockey

World Championships
Silver medal – second place	2011 Slovakia	
Bronze medal – third place	2010 Germany	
Bronze medal – third place	2009 Switzerland	

As a citizen of Sweden, Gunnarsson has competed with Team Sweden at the international level for both junior and senior competitions. Gunnarsson made his junior international debut for Sweden at the 2004 IIHF World Under-18 Championships, where he played in six games and recorded 24 penalty minutes.

Gunnarsson's first senior team debut was during the 2009 IIHF World Championship in Switzerland. He scored the winning goal in the bronze medal game to beat Team USA for a third-place finish. The following year, Gunnarsson was selected to compete with Team Sweden during 2010 IIHF World Championship where he again earned a bronze medal. His first silver medal came during the 2011 IIHF World Championship, where Team Sweden beat the Czech Republic. He played in nine games and recorded two points.

== Personal life ==
Gunnarsson and his wife Josefin have two children together, a son and daughter.

== Career statistics ==
=== Regular season and playoffs ===
			Regular season					Playoffs
Season	Team	League	GP	G	A	Pts	PIM	GP	G	A	Pts	PIM
2002–03	HC Örebro 90	SWE.2 U20	—	—	—	—	—	3	0	0	0	0
2003–04	HC Örebro 90	Allsv	43	0	4	4	16	8	0	4	4	0
2004–05	Linköpings HC	J18	1	0	1	1	2	—	—	—	—	—
2004–05	Linköpings HC	J20	22	2	5	7	24	—	—	—	—	—
2005–06	Linköpings HC	J20	30	7	6	13	26	4	1	0	1	4
2005–06	Linköpings HC	SEL	14	0	0	0	0	—	—	—	—	—
2005–06	Arboga IFK	Allsv	12	1	5	6	8	—	—	—	—	—
2006–07	Linköpings HC	J20	6	0	5	5	6	—	—	—	—	—
2006–07	Linköpings HC	SEL	30	2	2	4	8	—	—	—	—	—
2006–07	VIK Västerås HK	Allsv	15	2	3	5	14	—	—	—	—	—
2007–08	Linköpings HC	SEL	53	2	7	9	26	16	0	4	4	10
2008–09	Linköpings HC	SEL	53	6	10	16	26	7	0	1	1	2
2009–10	Toronto Marlies	AHL	12	0	2	2	2	—	—	—	—	—
2009–10	Toronto Maple Leafs	NHL	43	3	12	15	10	—	—	—	—	—
2010–11	Toronto Maple Leafs	NHL	68	4	16	20	14	—	—	—	—	—
2011–12	Toronto Maple Leafs	NHL	76	4	15	19	20	—	—	—	—	—
2012–13	Örebro HK	Allsv	10	0	4	4	2	—	—	—	—	—
2012–13	Toronto Maple Leafs	NHL	37	1	14	15	14	7	0	1	1	0
2013–14	Toronto Maple Leafs	NHL	80	3	14	17	34	—	—	—	—	—
2014–15	St. Louis Blues	NHL	61	2	10	12	2	6	0	0	0	0
2015–16	St. Louis Blues	NHL	72	3	6	9	31	19	0	2	2	7
2016–17	St. Louis Blues	NHL	56	0	6	6	4	11	0	0	0	2
2017–18	St. Louis Blues	NHL	63	5	4	9	22	—	—	—	—	—
2018–19	St. Louis Blues	NHL	25	3	4	7	6	19	1	2	3	4
2018–19	San Antonio Rampage	AHL	2	0	0	0	2	—	—	—	—	—
2019–20	St. Louis Blues	NHL	36	2	5	7	16	6	0	1	1	6
2020–21	St. Louis Blues	NHL	12	0	2	2	6	—	—	—	—	—
SHL totals			150	10	19	29	60	23	0	5	5	12
NHL totals			629	30	108	138	179	68	1	6	7	19

=== International ===
Year	Team	Event	Result	GP	G	A	Pts	PIM
2004	Sweden	WJC18	5th	6	0	0	0	24
2009	Sweden	WC	3rd place, bronze medalist(s)	6	2	0	2	4
2010	Sweden	WC	3rd place, bronze medalist(s)	9	1	1	2	2
2011	Sweden	WC	2nd place, silver medalist(s)	9	0	2	2	2
Junior totals				6	0	0	0	24
Senior totals				24	3	3	6	8

== Awards and honors ==
Award	Year	Ref
NHL
Stanley Cup champion	2019	
