= 2005–06 SIJHL season =

5th season of the SIJHL

- League: SIJHL
- Sport: Ice hockey
- Duration: Regular season September–June; Postseason; March–April
- Teams: 5 full-time 1 part-time
- Finals champions: Fort William North Stars

SIJHL seasons
- 2004–05 2006–07

The 2005–06 SIJHL season is the 5th season of the Superior International Junior Hockey League (SIJHL). The six teams of the SIJHL played 52-game schedules, except for Minot State University-Bottineau who played a 20-game season.

The Fort William North Stars finished the regular season in first place and went on to win the league championship Bill Salonen Cup. North Stars' goalie, Carter Hutton, set a league record for shutouts in a season with 10. The North Stars then became the first SIJHL team to win the regional championship Dudley Hewitt Cup.

== Changes ==
- Schreiber Diesels join league.
- Minot State University-Bottineau Lumberjacks join league on part-time basis.
- Fort Frances Borderland Thunder leave league.

== Regular season ==
Note: GP = Games played; W = Wins; L = Losses; OTL = Overtime losses; SL = Shootout losses; GF = Goals for; GA = Goals against; PTS = Points; x = clinched playoff berth; y = clinched division title; z = clinched conference title

Team	Centre	W–L–T-OTL	GF	GA	Points
x-Fort William North Stars	Thunder Bay	50-2-0-0	353	101	100
x-Dryden Ice Dogs	Dryden	35-14-1-2	247	159	73
x-Schreiber Diesels	Schreiber	20-27-3-2	231	300	45
x-Thunder Bay Golden Hawks	Thunder Bay	14-34-2-2	202	270	32
Thunder Bay Bulldogs	Thunder Bay	9-41-1-1	138	340	20
MSU-Bottineau Lumberjacks	Bottineau, ND	8-9-1-2	86	87	19

Teams listed on the official league website.

Standings listed on official league website.

== Postseason ==
Semi-finals
1	Fort William North Stars	4
4	Thunder Bay Golden Hawks	0
2	Dryden Ice Dogs	4
3	Schreiber Diesels	0

Salonen Cup Finals
1	Fort William North Stars	4
2	Dryden Ice Dogs	0

Playoff results are listed on the official league website.

== Regional championship ==
Hosted by the Fort William North Stars in Thunder Bay, Ontario. Fort William finished won the tournament, Dryden finished in third.

Round Robin

Dryden Ice Dogs 3 - St. Michael's Buzzers (OPJHL) 2
Fort William North Stars 6 - Sudbury Jr. Wolves (NOJHL) 1
Sudbury Jr. Wolves (NOJHL) 6 - Dryden Ice Dogs 1
St. Michael's Buzzers (OPJHL) 7 - Fort William North Stars 1
Fort William North Stars 3 - Dryden Ice Dogs 0

Semi-final

Sudbury Jr. Wolves (NOJHL) 5 - Dryden Ice Dogs 4

Final

Fort William North Stars 7 - Sudbury Jr. Wolves (NOJHL) 6 OT

== National championship ==
Hosted by the Streetsville Derbys in Brampton, Ontario. Fort William finished third in the round robin and was eliminated in the semi-final.

Round Robin

Streetsville Derbys (OPJHL) 3 - Fort William North Stars 2
Fort William North Stars 4 - Joliette Action (QJAAAHL) 3 2OT
Burnaby Express (BCHL) 3 - Fort William North Stars 2
Fort William North Stars 2 - Yorkton Terriers (SJHL) 1

Semi-final

Burnaby Express (BCHL) 3 - Fort William North Stars 2 OT

== See also ==
- 2006 Royal Bank Cup
- Dudley Hewitt Cup

Preceded by 2004–05 SIJHL season	SIJHL seasons	Succeeded by 2006–07 SIJHL season
