= 2006–07 SIJHL season =

- League: Superior International Junior Hockey League
- Sport: Hockey
- Duration: Regular season 2006-09 – 2007-03; Playoffs; 2007-03 – 2007-04
- Teams: 6
- Finals champions: Schreiber Diesels

SIJHL seasons
- 2005–06 2007–08

The 2006–07 SIJHL season is the 6th season of the Superior International Junior Hockey League (SIJHL). The six teams of the SIJHL will play 50-game schedules.

Come February, the top teams of the league will play down for the Bill Salonen Cup, the SIJHL championship. The winner of the Bill Salonen Cup will compete in the Central Canadian Junior "A" championship, the Dudley Hewitt Cup. If successful against the winners of the Ontario Junior Hockey League and Northern Ontario Junior Hockey League, the champion would then move on to play in the Canadian Junior Hockey League championship, the 2007 Royal Bank Cup.

== Changes ==
- Marathon Renegades join league.
- Thunder Bay Golden Hawks become Thunder Bay Bearcats.
- Minot State University-Bottineau Lumberjacks discontinue part-time status with league.

== Final standings ==
Note: GP = Games played; W = Wins; L = Losses; OTL = Overtime losses; SL = Shootout losses; GF = Goals for; GA = Goals against; PTS = Points; x = clinched playoff berth; y = clinched division title; z = clinched conference title

Team	Centre	W–L–T-OTL	GF	GA	Points
x-Fort William North Stars	Thunder Bay	41-6-3-0	307	132	85
x-Schreiber Diesels	Schreiber	33-11-2-4	351	204	72
x-Thunder Bay Bearcats	Thunder Bay	29-17-1-3	250	201	62
x-Dryden Ice Dogs	Dryden	23-23-4-0	216	212	50
Thunder Bay Bulldogs	Thunder Bay	13-34-2-1	193	309	29
Marathon Renegades	Marathon	5-45-0-0	145	404	10

Teams listed on the official league website.

Standings listed on official league website.

== 2006-07 Bill Salonen Cup Playoffs ==
Semi-finals
1	Fort William	4
4	Dryden	1
2	Schreiber	4
3	TB Bulldogs	2

Salonen Cup Finals
1	Fort William	3
2	Schreiber	4

Playoff results are listed on the official league website.

== Dudley Hewitt Cup Championship ==
Hosted by the Abitibi Eskimos in Iroquois Falls, Ontario. Schreiber finished in second place.

Round Robin

Schreiber Diesels 5 - Abitibi Eskimos (NOJHL) 4
Aurora Tigers (OPJHL) 6 - Schreiber Diesels 3
Soo Indians (NOJHL) 2 - Schreiber Diesels 1

Semi-final

Schreiber Diesels 6 - Abitibi Eskimos (NOJHL) 5 2OT

Final

Aurora Tigers (OPJHL) 10 - Schreiber Diesels 0

== Scoring leaders ==
Note: GP = Games played; G = Goals; A = Assists; Pts = Points; PIM = Penalty minutes

Player / Team / GP / G / A / Pts / PIM

== Leading goaltenders ==
Note: GP = Games played; Mins = Minutes played; W = Wins; L = Losses: OTL = Overtime losses; SL = Shootout losses; GA = Goals Allowed; SO = Shutouts; GAA = Goals against average

Player / Team / GP / Mins / W / L / OTL / SOL / GA / SO / Sv% / GAA

== Awards ==
- Most Valuable Player -
- Most Improved Player -
- Rookie of the Year -
- Top Defenceman -
- Top Defensive Forward - Jason MacMillan
- Most Gentlemanly Player -
- Top Goaltender -
- Coach of the Year -
- Top Scorer Award -
- Top Executive -

== See also ==
- 2007 Royal Bank Cup
- Dudley Hewitt Cup

== Sources ==
- Russon, Randy (25 October 2022). "How the small town Schreiber Diesels won a junior hockey crown in stunning fashion". saultthisweek.com. Postmedia.

Preceded by 2005–06 SIJHL season	SIJHL seasons	Succeeded by 2007–08 SIJHL season
