= 2011–12 SIJHL season =

- League: Superior International Junior Hockey League
- Sport: Hockey
- Duration: Regular season 2011-09-16 – 2012-02-26; Playoffs; 2012-02-28 – 2012-04-11
- Teams: 7
- Finals champions: Wisconsin Wilderness

SIJHL seasons
- 2010–11 2012–13

The 2011–12 season was the 11th season of the Superior International Junior Hockey League (SIJHL). The seven teams of the SIJHL played 56-game schedules.

The top teams of the league played for the Bill Salonen Cup, the SIJHL championship, in February. The Wisconsin Wilderness won the Bill Salonen Cup and competed in the Central Canadian Junior "A" championship, the Dudley Hewitt Cup.

== Changes ==
- Iron Range Ironheads of Chisholm, Minnesota joined the league.

== Standings ==
Note: GP = Games played; W = Wins; L = Losses; OTL = Overtime losses; SL = Shootout losses; GF = Goals for; GA = Goals against; PTS = Points; x = clinched playoff berth; y = clinched division title; z = clinched conference title

Standings
Team	Centre	W–L–OTL	GF–GA	Points
Wisconsin Wilderness	Spooner, Wisconsin	49-6-1	259-97	99
Fort Frances Lakers	Fort Frances, Ontario	37-12-7	255-166	81
Thunder Bay North Stars	Thunder Bay, Ontario	31-19-6	242-156	68
Dryden Ice Dogs	Dryden, Ontario	25-24-7	212-200	57
Sioux Lookout Flyers	Sioux Lookout, Ontario	25-29-2	202-227	52
Duluth Clydesdales	Duluth, Minnesota	20-33-3	200-247	43
Iron Range Ironheads	Chisholm, Minnesota	9-45-2	155-432	20

Teams listed on the official league website.

Standings listed on official league website.

== 2011-12 Bill Salonen Cup Playoffs ==
Quarter-finals
4	Dryden	4
5	Sioux Lookout	1
3	Thunder Bay	4
6	Duluth	0

Semi-finals
2	Fort Frances	4
4	Dryden	0
1	Wisconsin	4
3	Thunder Bay	0

Bill Salonen Cup Finals
2	Fort Frances	3
1	Wisconsin	4

Playoff results are listed on the official league website.

=== Survivor Series ===
Winner plays 3rd seed in Quarter-final.
Best-of-Three.

Survivor Series
6	Duluth	2
7	Iron Range	0

=== Super Series ===
Winner gets choice of opponent in semi-finals. A team gets a point for winning the first two-game-aggregate in games one and two, and another point for games three and four. If tied 1-1 after four games, the series goes to sudden death shootout.

Super Series
1	Wisconsin	1
2	Fort Frances (5-4 SO)	1

== Dudley Hewitt Cup Championship ==
Hosted by the Thunder Bay North Stars in Thunder Bay, Ontario. The North Stars finished third in the round robin and lost the semi-final to finish third overall. The Wisconsin Wilderness finished fourth in the round robin and failed to make the playoff rounds.

Round Robin

Soo Thunderbirds (NOJHL) 4 - Wisconsin Wilderness 3 in overtime
Stouffville Spirit (OJHL) 2 - Thunder Bay North Stars 1 in overtime
Wisconsin Wilderness 5 - Stouffville Spirit (OJHL) 2
Soo Thunderbirds (NOJHL) 4 - Thunder Bay North Stars 3
Thunder Bay North Stars 4 - Wisconsin Wilderness 3 in overtime

Semi-final

Soo Thunderbirds (NOJHL) 8 - Thunder Bay North Stars 5

== Scoring leaders ==
Note: GP = Games played; G = Goals; A = Assists; Pts = Points; PIM = Penalty minutes

Player	Team	GP	G	A	Pts	PIM
Byron Katapaytuk	Fort Frances Lakers	52	32	53	85	54
Anthony Wolfe	Sioux Lookout Flyers	48	24	60	84	103
Chris Hoffman	Sioux Lookout Flyers	52	49	31	80	156
Mike Dietrich	Wisconsin Wilderness	55	36	33	69	50
Jordan Larson	Fort Frances Lakers	56	34	35	69	20
Jordan Shockley	Wisconsin Wilderness	59	24	42	66	46
Dane Morin	Sioux Lookout Flyers	55	22	44	66	25
Ryan Lobreau	Dryden Ice Dogs	53	27	37	64	79
Hunter Scott	Duluth Clydesdales	50	34	29	63	18
Matt Morsette	Duluth Clydesdales	54	30	30	60	108

== Leading goaltenders ==
Note: GP = Games played; Mins = Minutes played; W = Wins; L = Losses: OTL = Overtime losses; SL = Shootout losses; GA = Goals Allowed; SO = Shutouts; GAA = Goals against average

Player	Team	GP	Mins	W	L	OTL	SOL	GA	SO	Sv%	GAA
Tanner Milliron	Wisconsin Wilderness	35	2026:04	30	3	0	0	53	7	0.936	1.57
Tanner Hamilton	Fort Frances Lakers	21	1144:26	14	3	2	0	52	0	0.915	2.73
Tyler Ampe	Fort Frances Lakers	37	2253:45	22	9	0	5	105	2	0.914	2.80
Marc Nother	Thunder Bay North Stars	37	2100:45	22	13	0	2	82	5	0.909	2.34
Jayme Brattengeier	Sioux Lookout Flyers	43	2446:20	18	24	0	1	157	0	0.903	3.85

== Awards ==
- Player of the Year: Byron Katapaytuk (Fort Frances Lakers)
- Coach of the Year: Rod Aldoff (Wisconsin Wilderness)
- Top Goaltender: Tanner Milliron (Wisconsin Wilderness)
- Top Defensive Forward: Sam Dubinsky (Thunder Bay North Stars)
- Rookie of the Year: Jordan Larson (Fort Frances Lakers)
- Top Defenceman: Anthony Calabrese (Wisconsin Wilderness)
- Most Improved Player: Matt Morsette (Duluth Clydesdales)
- Most Sportsmanlike Player: Dane Morin (Sioux Lookout Flyers)
- Top Scorer: Byron Katapaytuk (Fort Frances Lakers)
- Playoff MVP: Jeremy Johnson (Wisconsin Wilderness)

== See also ==
- 2012 Royal Bank Cup
- Dudley Hewitt Cup
- Ontario Junior Hockey League
- Northern Ontario Junior Hockey League
- Greater Ontario Junior Hockey League
- 2011 in ice hockey
- 2012 in ice hockey

Preceded by 2010–11 SIJHL season	SIJHL seasons	Succeeded by 2012–13 SIJHL season
