= 2007–08 SIJHL season =

- League: Superior International Junior Hockey League
- Sport: Hockey
- Duration: Regular season 2007-09 – 2008-03; Playoffs; 2008-03 – 2008-04
- Teams: 7
- Finals champions: Dryden Ice Dogs

SIJHL seasons
- 2006–07 2008–09

The 2007–08 SIJHL season is the 7th season of the Superior International Junior Hockey League (SIJHL). The seven teams of the SIJHL will play 50-game schedules.

Come February, the top teams of the league will play down for the Bill Salonen Cup, the SIJHL championship. The winner of the Bill Salonen Cup will compete in the Central Canadian Junior "A" championship, the Dudley Hewitt Cup. If successful against the winners of the Ontario Junior Hockey League and Northern Ontario Junior Hockey League, the champion would then move on to play in the Canadian Junior Hockey League championship, the 2008 Royal Bank Cup.

== Changes ==
- Fort Frances Jr. Sabres join league.
- Marathon Renegades fold mid-season (February).

== Final standings ==
Note: GP = Games played; W = Wins; L = Losses; OTL = Overtime losses; SL = Shootout losses; GF = Goals for; GA = Goals against; PTS = Points; x = clinched playoff berth; y = clinched division title; z = clinched conference title

Team	Centre	W–L–T-OTL	GF	GA	Points
Dryden Ice Dogs	Dryden	36-11-1-2	240	149	75
Fort William North Stars	Thunder Bay	35-11-1-3	218	134	74
Thunder Bay Bearcats	Thunder Bay	33-16-1-0	213	147	67
Schreiber Diesels	Schreiber	25-22-3-0	184	181	53
Fort Frances Jr. Sabres	Fort Frances	22-21-4-3	173	183	51
Thunder Bay Bulldogs	Thunder Bay	9-38-3-0	111	212	21
Marathon Renegades	Marathon	7-26-3-1	128	248	18

Teams listed on the official league website.

Standings listed on official league website.

== 2007-08 Bill Salonen Cup Playoffs ==
Quarter-final
4	Schreiber	3
5	Fort Frances	0
3	TB Bearcats	3
6	TB Bulldogs	0

Semi-final
1	Dryden	4
4	Schreiber	3
2	Fort William	4
3	TB Bearcats	1

Salonen Cup
1	Dryden	4
2	Fort William	1

Playoff results are listed on the official league website.

== Dudley Hewitt Cup Championship ==
Hosted by the Newmarket Hurricanes in Newmarket, Ontario. Dryden finished in third place.

Round Robin

Oakville Blades (OPJHL) 5 - Dryden Ice Dogs 1
Newmarket Hurricanes (OPJHL) 7 - Dryden Ice Dogs 1
Dryden Ice Dogs 4 - Sudbury Jr. Wolves (NOJHL) 0

Semi-final

Newmarket Hurricanes (OPJHL) 2 - Dryden Ice Dogs 1

== Scoring leaders ==
Note: GP = Games played; G = Goals; A = Assists; Pts = Points; PIM = Penalty minutes

Player / Team / GP / G / A / Pts / PIM

== Leading goaltenders ==
Note: GP = Games played; Mins = Minutes played; W = Wins; L = Losses: OTL = Overtime losses; SL = Shootout losses; GA = Goals Allowed; SO = Shutouts; GAA = Goals against average

Player / Team / GP / Mins / W / L / OTL / SOL / GA / SO / Sv% / GAA

== Awards ==
- Most Valuable Player - Quinn Amiel (Fort Frances Jr. Sabres)
- Most Improved Player -
- Rookie of the Year - Mitch Cain (Fort Frances Jr. Sabres)
- Top Defenceman - Brad Pawlowski (Thunder Bay Bearcats)
- Top Defensive Forward -
- Most Gentlemanly Player -
- Top Goaltender - Drew Strandberg (Thunder Bay Bearcats)
- Coach of the Year - Wayne Strachan (Fort Frances Jr. Sabres)
- Top Scorer Award -
- Top Executive - Carolyn Kellaway, Nancy Gradiman (Fort Frances Jr. Sabres)

== See also ==
- 2008 Royal Bank Cup
- Dudley Hewitt Cup

Preceded by 2006–07 SIJHL season	SIJHL seasons	Succeeded by 2008–09 SIJHL season
