= 2008–09 SIJHL season =

- League: Superior International Junior Hockey League
- Sport: Hockey
- Duration: Regular season 2008-09-19 – 2009-03-09; Playoffs; 2009-03-13 – 2009-04-12
- Teams: 6
- Finals champions: Fort William North Stars

SIJHL seasons
- 2007–08 2009–10

The 2008–09 SIJHL season is the 8th season of the Superior International Junior Hockey League (SIJHL). The six teams of the SIJHL will play 50-game schedules.

Come February, the top teams of the league will play down for the Bill Salonen Cup, the SIJHL championship. The winner of the Bill Salonen Cup will compete in the Central Canadian Junior "A" championship, the Dudley Hewitt Cup. If successful against the winners of the Ontario Junior Hockey League and Northern Ontario Junior Hockey League, the champion would then move on to play in the Canadian Junior Hockey League championship, the 2009 Royal Bank Cup.

== Changes ==
- Sioux Lookout Flyers join league.
- Thunder Bay Bulldogs merge into Thunder Bay Bearcats.

== Final standings ==
Note: GP = Games played; W = Wins; L = Losses; OTL = Overtime losses; SL = Shootout losses; GF = Goals for; GA = Goals against; PTS = Points; x = clinched playoff berth; y = clinched division title; z = clinched conference title

Team	Centre	W–L–T-OTL	GF	GA	Points
Fort William North Stars	Thunder Bay	39-7-0-4	307	129	82
Thunder Bay Bearcats	Thunder Bay	33-11-0-6	221	142	72
Fort Frances Jr. Sabres	Fort Frances	30-17-0-3	199	139	63
Schreiber Diesels	Schreiber	26-21-0-3	213	220	55
Dryden Ice Dogs	Dryden	20-25-0-5	170	210	45
Sioux Lookout Flyers	Sioux Lookout	2-46-0-2	97	367	6

Teams listed on the official league website.

Standings listed on official league website.

== 2008-09 Bill Salonen Cup Playoffs ==
Quarter-final
4	Schreiber	3
5	Dryden	0
3	Fort Frances	3
6	Sioux Lookout	0

Semi-final
1	Fort William	4
4	Schreiber	3
2	Thunder Bay	4
3	Fort Frances	1

Salonen Cup
1	Fort William	4
2	Thunder Bay	1

Playoff results are listed on the official league website.

== Dudley Hewitt Cup Championship ==
Hosted by the Schreiber Diesels in Schreiber, Ontario. Fort William finished in second place and Schreiber finished in third.

Round Robin

Fort William North Stars 2 - Soo Thunderbirds (NOJHL) 0
Kingston Voyageurs (OJHL) 9 - Schreiber Diesels 0
Fort William North Stars 1 - Kingston Voyageurs (OJHL) 0
Schreiber Diesels 2 - Soo Thunderbirds (NOJHL) 0
Schreiber Diesels 5 - Fort William North Stars 2

Semi-final

Fort William North Stars 4 - Schreiber Diesels 3

Final

Kingston Voyageurs (OJHL) 4 - Fort William North Stars 1

== Scoring leaders ==
Note: GP = Games played; G = Goals; A = Assists; Pts = Points; PIM = Penalty minutes

Player	Team	GP	G	A	Pts	PIM
Trevor Gamache	Fort William North Stars	49	41	62	103	155
Joel Langevin	Fort William North Stars	49	31	44	75	28
Chris Sinclair	Fort Frances Jr. Sabres	49	18	54	72	75
Brendan Baumgartner	Fort Frances Jr. Sabres	49	35	35	70	84
Ryan Magill	Fort William North Stars	46	26	41	67	51
Cayle Brown	Fort William North Stars	48	27	37	64	89
Jared Saunders	Schreiber Diesels	48	31	31	62	91
Jeff Manryk	Thunder Bay Bearcats	44	28	34	62	117
Mitch Cain	Fort Frances Jr. Sabres	48	26	36	62	62
Tyler Miller	Thunder Bay Bearcats	27	24	37	61	57

== Leading goaltenders ==
Note: GP = Games played; Mins = Minutes played; W = Wins; L = Losses: OTL = Overtime losses; SL = Shootout losses; GA = Goals Allowed; SO = Shutouts; GAA = Goals against average

Player	Team	GP	Mins	W	L	OTL	SOL	GA	SO	Sv%	GAA
Ryan Faragher	Fort Frances Jr. Sabres	40	2265:41	24	14	0	1	92	5	0.921	2.44
Drew Strandberg	Thunder Bay Bearcats	34	1912:48	20	6	1	5	83	2	0.918	2.60
Jay Pelletier	Fort William North Stars	25	1122:10	14	2	0	2	36	2	0.917	1.92
Patrick Sullivan	Fort William North Stars	32	1729:01	23	5	1	0	76	3	0.901	2.64
Josh Baker	Schreiber Diesels	41	2309:01	19	17	2	1	155	1	0.893	4.03

== Awards ==
- Most Valuable Player - Trevor Gamache (Fort William North Stars)
- Most Improved Player - Kevin Burton (Dryden Ice Dogs)
- Rookie of the Year - Jay Pelletier (Fort William North Stars)
- Top Defenceman - Brad Pawlowski (Thunder Bay Bearcats)
- Top Defensive Forward - Cayle Brown (Fort William North Stars)

and Mitch Cain (Fort Frances Jr. Sabres)

- Most Gentlemanly Player - Joel Langevin (Fort William North Stars)
- Top Goaltender - Ryan Faragher (Fort Frances Jr. Sabres)
- Coach of the Year - Todd Howarth (Fort William North Stars)
- Top Scorer Award - Trevor Gamache (Fort William North Stars)
- Top Executive - Doug Lawrance (Sioux Lookout Flyers)

== See also ==
- 2009 Royal Bank Cup
- Dudley Hewitt Cup

Preceded by 2007–08 SIJHL season	SIJHL seasons	Succeeded by 2009–10 SIJHL season
