= 2010–11 SIJHL season =

- League: Superior International Junior Hockey League
- Sport: Hockey
- Duration: Regular season 2010-09-16 – 2011-02-26; Playoffs; 2011-03-03 – 2011-04-08
- Teams: 6
- Finals champions: Wisconsin Wilderness

SIJHL seasons
- 2009–10 2011–12

The 2010–11 SIJHL season was the 10th season of the Superior International Junior Hockey League (SIJHL). The six teams of the SIJHL played 56-game schedules.

Come February, the top teams of the league played down for the Bill Salonen Cup, the SIJHL championship. The winner of the Bill Salonen Cup will compete in the Central Canadian Junior "A" championship, the Dudley Hewitt Cup. If successful against the winners of the Ontario Junior Hockey League and Northern Ontario Junior Hockey League, the champion would then move on to play in the Canadian Junior Hockey League championship, the 2011 Royal Bank Cup.

== Changes ==
- Thunder Bay Wolverines leave league.
- Duluth Clydesdales join the league.
- Wisconsin Wilderness join league from Minnesota Junior Hockey League.
- Fort William North Stars change ownership in October, renamed Thunder Bay North Stars.

== Current Standings ==
Note: GP = Games played; W = Wins; L = Losses; OTL = Overtime losses; SL = Shootout losses; GF = Goals for; GA = Goals against; PTS = Points; x = clinched playoff berth; y = clinched division title; z = clinched conference title

Standings
Team	Centre	W-L-OTL	GF–GA	Points
Wisconsin Wilderness	Spooner, Wisconsin	45-6-5	264-122	95
Fort Frances Lakers	Fort Frances, Ontario	34-19-3	208-174	71
Dryden Ice Dogs	Dryden, Ontario	34-20-2	184-152	70
Thunder Bay North Stars	Thunder Bay, Ontario	32-21-3	191-163	67
Sioux Lookout Flyers	Sioux Lookout, Ontario	12-38-6	136-238	30
Duluth Clydesdales	Duluth, Minnesota	11-41-4	127-261	26

Teams listed on the official league website.

Standings listed on official league website.

== 2010-11 Bill Salonen Cup Playoffs ==
Quarter-finals
4	Thunder Bay	4
5	Sioux Lookout	1
3	Dryden	4
6	Duluth	0

Semi-finals
1	Wisconsin	4
4	Thunder Bay	0
2	Fort Frances	2
3	Dryden	4

Bill Salonen Cup Finals
1	Wisconsin	4
3	Dryden	0

=== Super Series ===
Winner gets choice of opponent in semi-finals. A team gets a point for winning the first two-game-aggregate in games one and two, and another point for games three and four. If tied 1-1 after four games, the series goes to sudden death shootout.

Super Series
1	Wisconsin (2-1 SO)	1
2	Fort Frances	1

Playoff results are listed on the official league website.

== Dudley Hewitt Cup Championship ==
Hosted by the Huntsville Otters in Huntsville, Ontario. The Wisconsin Wilderness finished in fourth place.

Round Robin

Wellington Dukes (OJHL) 7 - Wisconsin Wilderness 2
Huntsville Otters (OJHL) 4 - Wisconsin Wilderness 3
Soo Eagles (NOJHL) 2 - Wisconsin Wilderness 1 in quadruple overtime

== Scoring leaders ==
Note: GP = Games played; G = Goals; A = Assists; Pts = Points; PIM = Penalty minutes

Player	Team	GP	G	A	Pts	PIM
Austin Adduono	Wisconsin Wilderness	54	32	40	72	30
Keith Tessin	Wisconsin Wilderness	55	38	32	70	45
Tyler Stevenson	Fort Frances Lakers	54	39	24	63	19
Tom Paine	Wisconsin Wilderness	54	30	33	63	68
Ben McClellan	Dryden Ice Dogs	56	27	32	59	40
Wilson Housley	Wisconsin Wilderness	51	23	35	58	26
Byron Katapaytuk	Fort Frances Lakers	54	20	36	56	53
Jace Baldwin	Fort Frances Lakers	54	22	33	55	96
Mitch Forbes	Thunder Bay North Stars	55	20	32	52	30
Bryce Anderson	Wisconsin Wilderness	55	9	43	52	16

== Leading goaltenders ==
Note: GP = Games played; Mins = Minutes played; W = Wins; L = Losses: OTL = Overtime losses; SL = Shootout losses; GA = Goals Allowed; SO = Shutouts; GAA = Goals against average

Player	Team	GP	Mins	W	L	OTL	SOL	GA	SO	Sv%	GAA
Jake Hebda	Wisconsin Wilderness	25	1469:48	21	2	0	1	46	4	.935	1.88
John McLean	Wisconsin Wilderness	32	1928:31	24	4	1	3	70	2	.926	2.18
Ian Perrier	Dryden Ice Dogs	43	2534:47	26	13	2	0	102	3	.913	2.41
Tyler Ampe	Fort Frances Lakers	38	2191:04	23	12	1	0	113	2	.907	3.09
Jesse Wilkins	Sioux Lookout Flyers	41	2387:52	10	26	3	1	156	0	.906	3.92

== Awards ==
- Top Defenceman: Jon Mitchell (Dryden Ice Dogs)
- Most Sportsmanlike Player: Tyler Stevenson (Fort Frances Lakers)
- Most Improved Player: Same Dubinsky (Thunder Bay North Stars)
- Rookie of the Year: Austin Adduono (Wisconsin Wilderness)
- Best Defensive Forward: Blake Boaz (Fort Frances Lakers)
- Top Goaltender: John McLean (Wisconsin Wilderness)
- Coach of the Year: Wayne Strachan (Fort Frances Lakers)
- Player of the Year: Jon Mitchell (Dryden Ice Dogs)
- Top Scorer: Austin Adduono (Wisconsin Wilderness)
- Scholastic Award: Morgan McNeill (Fort Frances Lakers)
- Executive of the Year: Rod Aldoff (Wisconsin Wilderness)
- Playoffs Most Valuable Player: John McLean (Wisconsin Wilderness)

== See also ==
- 2011 Royal Bank Cup
- Dudley Hewitt Cup

Preceded by 2009–10 SIJHL season	SIJHL seasons	Succeeded by 2011–12 SIJHL season
