= 2009–10 SIJHL season =

- League: Superior International Junior Hockey League
- Sport: Hockey
- Duration: Regular season 2009-09-17 – 2010-02-27; Playoffs; 2010-03-03 – 2010-04-06
- Teams: 5 Full-time; 1 Part-time
- Finals champions: Fort William North Stars

SIJHL seasons
- 2008–09 2010–11

The 2009–10 SIJHL season is the 9th season of the Superior International Junior Hockey League (SIJHL). The six teams of the SIJHL will play 52-game schedules, except for Wisconsin who will play a 20-game schedule.

Come February, the top teams of the league will play down for the Bill Salonen Cup, the SIJHL championship. The winner of the Bill Salonen Cup will compete in the Central Canadian Junior "A" championship, the Dudley Hewitt Cup. If successful against the winners of the Ontario Junior Hockey League and Northern Ontario Junior Hockey League, the champion would then move on to play in the Canadian Junior Hockey League championship, the 2010 Royal Bank Cup.

== Changes ==
- Thunder Bay Bearcats leave league.
- Schreiber Diesels leave league.
- Fort Frances Jr. Sabres become Fort Frances Lakers.
- Thunder Bay Wolverines join league from Thunder Bay Junior B Hockey League.
- Wisconsin Mustangs join league for part-time schedule.

== Final standings ==
Note: GP = Games played; W = Wins; L = Losses; OTL = Overtime losses; SL = Shootout losses; GF = Goals for; GA = Goals against; PTS = Points; x = clinched playoff berth; y = clinched division title; z = clinched conference title

Team	Centre	W-L-T-OTL	GF	GA	Points
Fort William North Stars	Thunder Bay	45-5-0-2	270	104	92
Dryden Ice Dogs	Dryden	38-9-0-5	235	148	81
Sioux Lookout Flyers	Sioux Lookout	20-27-0-5	159	210	45
Thunder Bay Wolverines	Thunder Bay	19-28-0-5	174	244	43
Fort Frances Lakers	Fort Frances	14-33-0-5	153	251	33
Wisconsin Mustangs	Spooner, WI	4-15-0-1	56	90	9

Teams listed on the official league website.

Standings listed on official league website.

== 2009-10 Bill Salonen Cup Playoffs ==
Quarter-final
4	Thunder Bay	3
5	Fort Frances	4

Semi-final
2	Dryden	4
5	Fort Frances	2
1	Fort William	4
3	Sioux Lookout	0

Salonen Cup
2	Dryden	1
1	Fort William	4

=== Preliminary round robin ===
Home-and-home format between SIJHL's three top teams. No teams are eliminated, winner gets pick of opponent in semi-final.

Team	W-L-OTL	GF	GA
Dryden	4-0-0	15	10
Fort William	2-0-2	12	9
Sioux Lookout	0-4-0	9	17

Playoff results are listed on the official league website.

== Dudley Hewitt Cup Championship ==
Hosted by the Soo Thunderbirds in Sault Ste. Marie, Ontario. Fort William finished in second place.

Round Robin

Fort William North Stars 3 - Soo Thunderbirds (NOJHL) 2 OT
Abitibi Eskimos (NOJHL) 4 - Fort William North Stars 3 OT
Oakville Blades (OJAHL) 2 - Fort William North Stars 1 OT

Semi-final

Fort William North Stars 3 - Soo Thunderbirds (NOJHL) 0

Final

Oakville Blades (OJAHL) 2 - Fort William North Stars 1

== Scoring leaders ==
Note: GP = Games played; G = Goals; A = Assists; Pts = Points; PIM = Penalty minutes

Player	Team	GP	G	A	Pts	PIM
Trevor Gamache	Fort William North Stars	50	25	55	80	139
Ryan Magill	Fort William North Stars	47	38	39	77	34
Jordan Davis	Fort William North Stars	52	33	40	73	88
Kevin Burton	Dryden Ice Dogs	49	30	32	62	40
Mitch Forbes	Fort William North Stars	51	26	36	62	48
BJ McClellan	Dryden Ice Dogs	52	24	38	62	83
Mike Lennon	Dryden Ice Dogs	53	12	46	58	24
John Mitchell	Dryden Ice Dogs	53	20	36	56	84
Kyle Heck	Dryden Ice Dogs	53	34	21	55	80
Chad Liley	Dryden Ice Dogs	44	22	30	52	69

== Leading goaltenders ==
Note: GP = Games played; Mins = Minutes played; W = Wins; L = Losses: OTL = Overtime losses; SL = Shootout losses; GA = Goals Allowed; SO = Shutouts; GAA = Goals against average

Player	Team	GP	Mins	W	L	OTL	SOL	GA	SO	Sv%	GAA
Josh Baker	Dryden Ice Dogs	22	1340:54	14	5	1	2	57	3	0.924	2.55
Guillaume Piche	Fort William North Stars	42	2365:50	34	4	1	0	75	6	0.919	1.90
Peter Emery	Sioux Lookout Flyers	29	1658:32	16	9	1	1	82	4	0.915	2.97
Jordan Giguere	Sioux Lookout Flyers	28	1459:43	12	10	3	1	88	0	0.904	3.62
Jameson Shortreed	Fort Frances Lakers	43	2269:34	10	26	1	3	172	3	0.895	4.55

== Awards ==
- Most Valuable Player - Trevor Gamache (Fort William North Stars)
- Most Improved Player - Matt Hunter (Thunder Bay Wolverines)
- Rookie of the Year - Jameson Shortreed (Fort Frances Lakers)
- Top Defenceman - Jon Mitchell (Dryden Ice Dogs)
- Top Defensive Forward - Ryan Magill (Fort William North Stars)
- Most Gentlemanly Player - Mike Lennon (Dryden Ice Dogs)
- Top Goaltender - Jameson Shortreed (Fort Frances Lakers)
- Coach of the Year - Clint Mylymok (Dryden Ice Dogs)
- Top Scorer Award - Trevor Gamache (Fort William North Stars)
- Top Executive - Ted Lake (Dryden Ice Dogs)

== See also ==
- 2010 Royal Bank Cup
- Dudley Hewitt Cup

Preceded by 2008–09 SIJHL season	SIJHL seasons	Succeeded by 2010–11 SIJHL season
