= Robert Bortuzzo =

Canadian ice hockey player (born 1989)

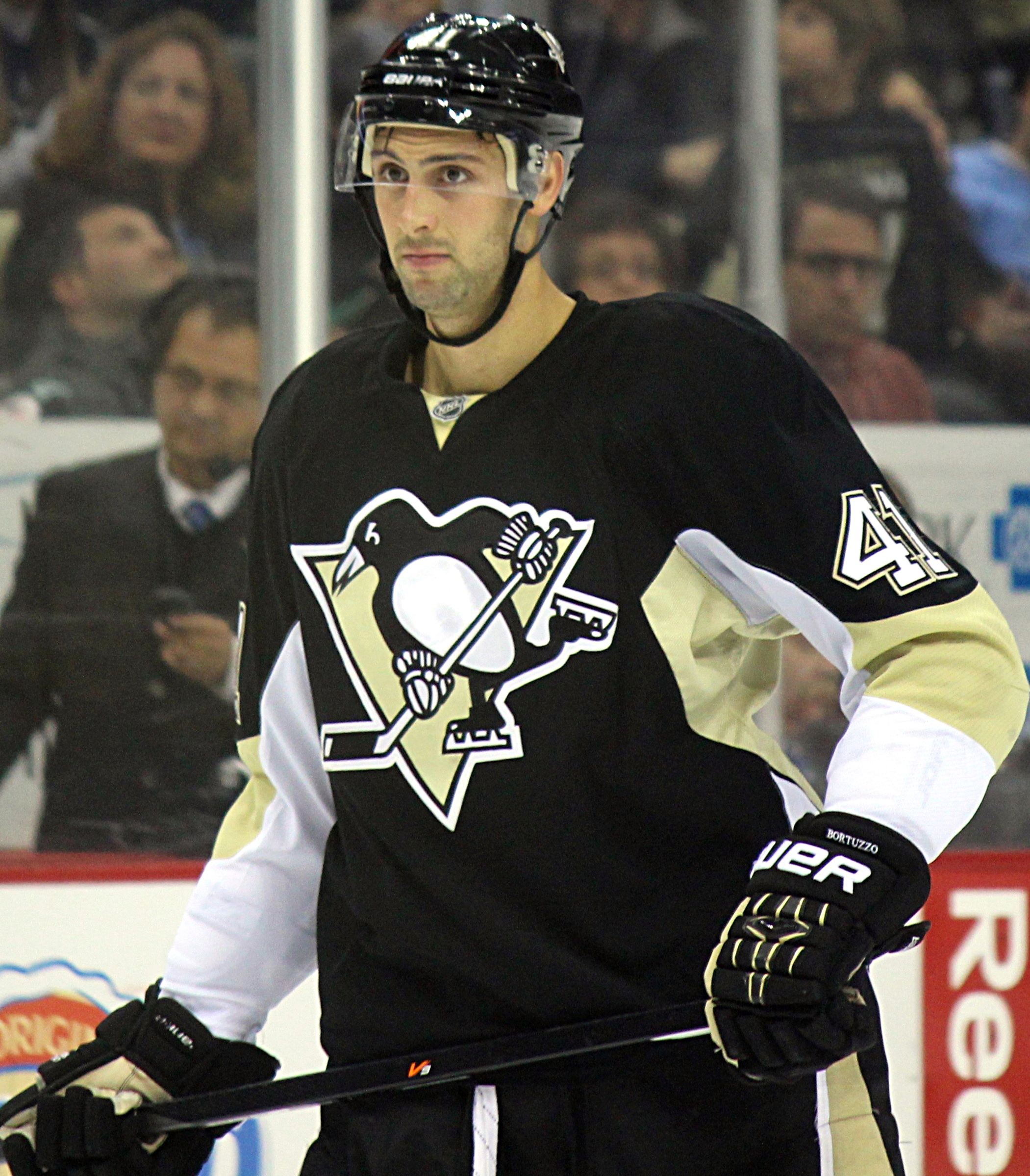
- Bortuzzo with the Pittsburgh Penguins in 2014
- Born: March 18, 1989 (age 37) Thunder Bay, Ontario, Canada
- Height: 6 ft 4 in (193 cm)
- Weight: 206 lb (93 kg; 14 st 10 lb)
- Position: Defence
- Shoots: Right
- NHL team Former teams: Free agent Pittsburgh Penguins; St. Louis Blues; New York Islanders; Utah Hockey Club
- NHL draft: 78th overall, 2007; Pittsburgh Penguins
- Playing career: 2009–present

Robert Bortuzzo (born March 18, 1989) is a Canadian former professional ice hockey player who is a scout for the St. Louis Blues of the National Hockey League (NHL). Bortuzzo was drafted 78th overall by the Pittsburgh Penguins during the 2007 NHL entry draft.

Growing up in Thunder Bay, Ontario, Bortuzzo played junior hockey with the Fort William North Stars with whom he won a Superior International Junior Hockey League (SIJHL) championship and Dudley Hewitt Cup. He was eventually drafted by the Windsor Spitfires of the Ontario Hockey League (OHL) and later traded to the Kitchener Rangers. During his time in the OHL, Bortuzzo drew comparisons to Fedor Tyutin and was praised as "a legitimate prospect" by NHL scouts. He spent three seasons with the Rangers before beginning his professional career with the Penguins organization.

Bortuzzo played seven seasons with the Penguins organization, during which he was named to the 2011 AHL All-Star Game. Bortuzzo was eventually traded to the St. Louis Blues on March 2, 2015, in exchange for Ian Cole. During the 2018–19 season, Bortuzzo won the Stanley Cup as a member of the Blues, becoming the first SIJHL alumnus to do so. Bortuzzo has also played for the New York Islanders and the Utah Hockey Club, now known as the Utah Mammoth.

== Early life ==
Bortuzzo was born on March 18, 1989, in Thunder Bay, Ontario, to parents Oscar and Susan. His father was a major junior ice hockey goaltender who was drafted by the Kitchener Rangers in 1977 and inducted into the Northwestern Ontario Sports Hall of Fame in 2003. His grandfather Sergio volunteered at Thunder Bay's DaVinci Centre and they host an annual bocce tournament in his name.

== Playing career ==
Growing up in Thunder Bay, Bortuzzo played both baseball and ice hockey. He co-captained his little league baseball team to the Senior League World Series after narrowly missing the Little League World Series three years prior. Bortuzzo was drafted by the Windsor Spitfires during the 2005 Ontario Hockey League (OHL) Priority Selection but chose to complete the 2005–06 season with the Fort William North Stars of the Superior International Junior Hockey League (SIJHL). During that season, he led the team to a league championship, Dudley Hewitt Cup but they failed to qualify for the 2006 Royal Bank Cup final. Although he went pointless in five games during the 2006 Royal Bank Cup Final, Bortuzzo called it a "great experience and definitely a great learning curve."

=== OHL ===
Upon completing the season with Fort William North Stars, Bortuzzo was acquired by the Kitchener Rangers of the OHL in exchange for a second-round pick in the 2007 draft on May 31, 2006. After attending the team's training camp, he recorded his first career OHL goal on November 2, in a 4–2 loss to the London Knights. Leading up to the 2007 NHL entry draft, Bortuzzo drew comparisons to Fedor Tyutin and was praised as "a legitimate prospect" by Mark Seidel, a scout for the NHL Draft. Although the NHL Central Scouting Bureau ranked Bortuzzo 48th overall North American skaters he was drafted in the third round, 78th overall, by the Pittsburgh Penguins.

On September 4, 2007, Bortuzzo was invited to the Pittsburgh Penguins NHL camp, but was re-assigned to the Rangers for the 2007–08 season. During his second season with the team, Bortuzzo helped the Rangers set a new franchise record for points in a season as he scored the game winning goal in a 4–3 win over the Saginaw Spirit. The Rangers eventually won the Hamilton Spectator Trophy as the OHL team who finished the regular season with the best record. Bortuzzo helped the team qualify for the 2008 Memorial Cup and, in spite of a shoulder injury, recorded eight assists and a plus-18 rating. Former Penguins director of player personnel Jay Heinbuck spoke highly of Bortuzzo's play during the tournament saying, "He's got a good work ethic, he doesn't get beat one-on-one, he has good puck skills. I don't envision him being an offensive defenseman, but his passing is above average."

During the offseason, Bortuzzo attended the Penguins 2008 Conditioning Camp, although he missed the beginning of the 2008–09 season due to a shoulder injury and subsequent recovery. Upon his return to the line-up, Bortuzzo played in the remaining 23 games and managed one goal and 16 assists. He signed a three-year entry-level contract with the Penguins on May 27, 2009, to conclude his major junior career. Bortuzzo finished his tenure with the Rangers accumulating 49 points in 138 regular-season games.

=== Pittsburgh Penguins ===
After attending the Penguins training camp, Bortuzzo was reassigned to their American Hockey League (AHL) affiliate, the Wilkes-Barre/Scranton Penguins on September 23, 2009, to begin the 2009–10 season. He recorded his first career AHL goal during the second period of a 5–3 loss to the Hartford Wolf Pack on November 19. In his rookie season, Bortuzzo tallied 12 points, 109 penalty minutes, and a plus-13 rating in 75 games.

After attending the Penguins training camp, Bortuzzo was re-assigned to the Wilkes-Barre/Scranton Penguins on September 29, 2010, to begin the season. Following a game against Norfolk Admirals on December 11, Bortuzzo, Jesse Boulerice, and Stefano Giliati were each suspended one game as a result of their actions. By January, he had recorded two goals and 16 assists in 45 games and was tied league-wide for third amongst AHL defencemen with a plus-17 rating. As a result, he was selected to compete in the 2011 AHL All Star Classic, where he scored two goals. Bortuzzo concluded his second season with the Penguins with 26 points in 79 games and earned a league-wide best plus-28.

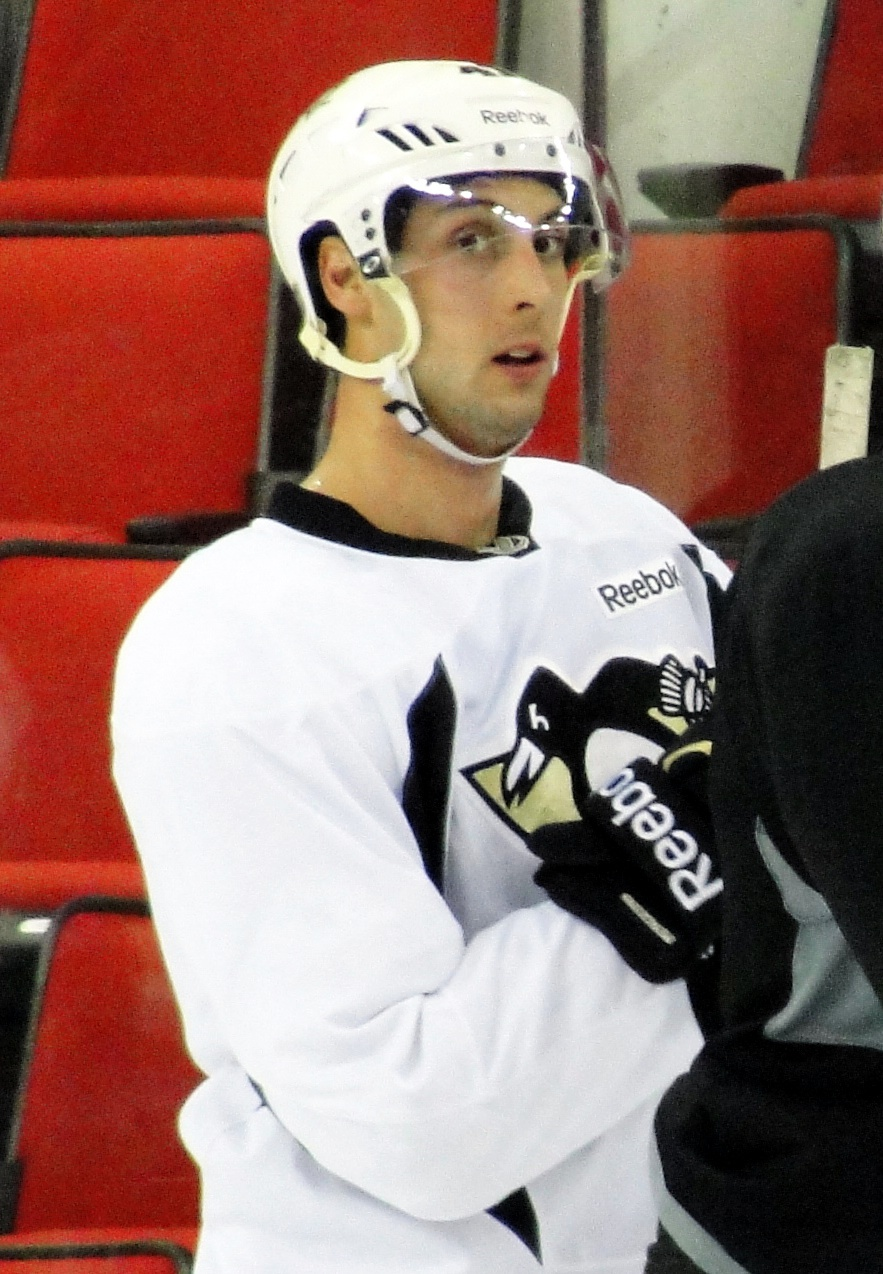
Bortuzzo at a morning skate with the Penguins in Raleigh, North Carolina, in 2011

For the third consecutive year, Bortuzzo attended the Penguins training camp, although he was placed on their injured reserve to begin the season. He also missed the team's final Rookie Tournament contest against the Blackhawks due to a lower body injury. Bortuzzo ended up missing all of training camp and the beginning of the season to recover from his injury. When he was medically cleared to play, he was assigned to the Wilkes-Barre/Scranton Penguins, whom he played two games with before being called up to the NHL for his debut on November 4. The following day, Bortuzzo made his NHL debut against the Los Angeles Kings as a replacement for an injured Ben Lovejoy. He subsequently became the first SIJHL alumni to skate in a National Hockey League game.

After going scoreless in his debut, he was returned to the AHL for a few games before earning another recall. While with the Penguins, Bortuzzo was injured during a game against the Philadelphia Flyers on December 8, 2011, from a hit by Zac Rinaldo. He was out for several weeks with a concussion but was able to return to action in Wilkes-Barre/Scranton later that season on January 7. As the most tenured player on the team, he helped them qualify for the 2012 Calder Cup playoffs, where they eventually lost in the Eastern Conference Semi-finals to the St. John's IceCaps. Bortuzzo completed the regular season with 21 points in 51 AHL games.

Prior to the 2012–13 season, Bortuzzo signed an AHL contract to stay with the Wilkes-Barre/Scranton Penguins. The 2012–13 lock-out-shortened season saw Bortuzzo's role continue to increase on the team, playing in 15 of Pittsburgh's 48 regular-season games. On February 2, 2013, Bortuzzo scored his first NHL goal, against goaltender Martin Brodeur of the New Jersey Devils; the Penguins went on to win 5–1. During the Penguins' lengthy run to the Eastern Conference Finals in the 2013 Stanley Cup playoffs, Bortuzzo did not make an appearance, being a healthy scratch every game.

Entering his seventh season with the Penguins organization, Bortuzzo made the team's opening-night roster for the first time during his tenure. In the 2013–14 season, Bortuzzo saw his playing time continue to increase, in part due to rampant injuries among the Penguins defensive core. He played in 54 of Pittsburgh's 82 regular-season games, recording ten assists. On April 26, 2014, Bortuzzo played in his first career Stanley Cup playoffs game, against the Columbus Blue Jackets in the first round of the 2014 playoffs, after Brooks Orpik sustained an undisclosed upper-body injury in the series' previous game. In his debut, he played 13:36 minutes during 5-on-5 play.

After suffering an injury during training camp, Bortuzzo joined the Penguins 2014–15 line-up on October 20, 2014. He sat as a healthy scratch at various times to begin the season before eventually scoring his first goal of the season on November 8, 2014. As a result of injuries to the Penguins blueline, Bortuzzo was paired with rookie Derrick Pouliot and accumulated five points in 13 games. In spite of this, he was suspended two games for interference against Jaromír Jágr during a game against the New Jersey Devils on December 4. By January, key members of the Penguins defence had returned from injury, resulting in him moving to a third pairing with Simon Després.

=== St. Louis Blues ===
After playing in 38 games for the Penguins and accumulating six points, Bortuzzo was traded to the St. Louis Blues in exchange for defenceman Ian Cole. He made his St. Louis Blues debut on March 5, 2015, against the Philadelphia Flyers at Wells Fargo Center. Bortuzzo played out the remainder of the 2014–15 season with the Blues, recording 2 points in 13 games. At the conclusion of the season, the Blues signed Bortuzzo to a two-year contract in order to keep him on the team. Although the Blues qualified for the 2015 Stanley Cup playoffs, he was unable to compete due to an upper-body injury.

On October 7, 2015, Bortuzzo was named to the Blues' opening-night roster to begin the 2015–16 season, although his ability to play was questioned due to a preseason injury. He suffered a lower body injury during a game against the Montreal Canadiens on January 17, 2016, and missed one game to recover. Bortuzzo made his post-season debut with the team during the 2016 Stanley Cup playoffs in the Western Conference Second Round against the Dallas Stars. Coach Ken Hitchcock paired him with Kevin Shattenkirk because "One's a defending player and one's an attacking player....Our feeling is we need more attacking right now. [Bortuzzo] is a guy that jumps up on the play, really attacks. He plays on his toes and he's good at joining the rush and making plays from the red line in." Although they beat the Stars, the team eventually lost to the San Jose Sharks during the Western Conference Final.

Although Bortuzzo was named to the Blues' opening-night roster to begin the 2016–17 season, he suffered a lower-body injury during a loss to the Detroit Red Wings on October 27, 2016, and missed ten games to recover. Upon returning from his injury, Bortuzzo was consistently paired with Colton Parayko until he was re-injured on December 3 during a game against the Winnipeg Jets and placed on injured reserve. As he was entering the final year of his contract, Bortuzzo signed a two-year, $2.3 million extension to stay with the team on December 29. At the time of his singing, he had recorded two points, a goal and an assist, in 11 games while also averaging 13:48 of ice time. Bortuzzo ended up missing a total of 16 games to recover from his injury against the Jets and returned to the Blues line-up on January 12, 2017, against the Los Angeles Kings. He suffered another injury on March 31 against the Colorado Avalanche which delayed his 2017 Stanley Cup playoffs debut until Game 2 against the Minnesota Wild. He played a total of 10 games before the Blues were eliminated from the postseason.

On October 2, 2017, Bortuzzo was named to the Blues' opening-night roster to begin the 2017–18 season, paired with rookie Vince Dunn. Seven days later, Bortuzzo was fined $3,091.40 for a cross-check delivered to the New York Islanders' forward Brock Nelson. As the season continued, Bortuzzo sat as a healthy scratch five times and was injured in his career-high 55th game of the season. He missed five games to recover from his left knee injury but returned to the Blues line-up on March 3. In spite of his injury, Bortuzzo set career highs in goals and points with four goals and 13 points. Bortuzzo competed with the Blues in the 2017 Stanley Cup playoffs, during which he hit Nashville Predators forward Kevin Fiala in Game 1 of the Western Conference Second Round, causing a season ending injury. The Blues ended up losing to the Predators in six games, sending the Predators to their first conference final in franchise history.

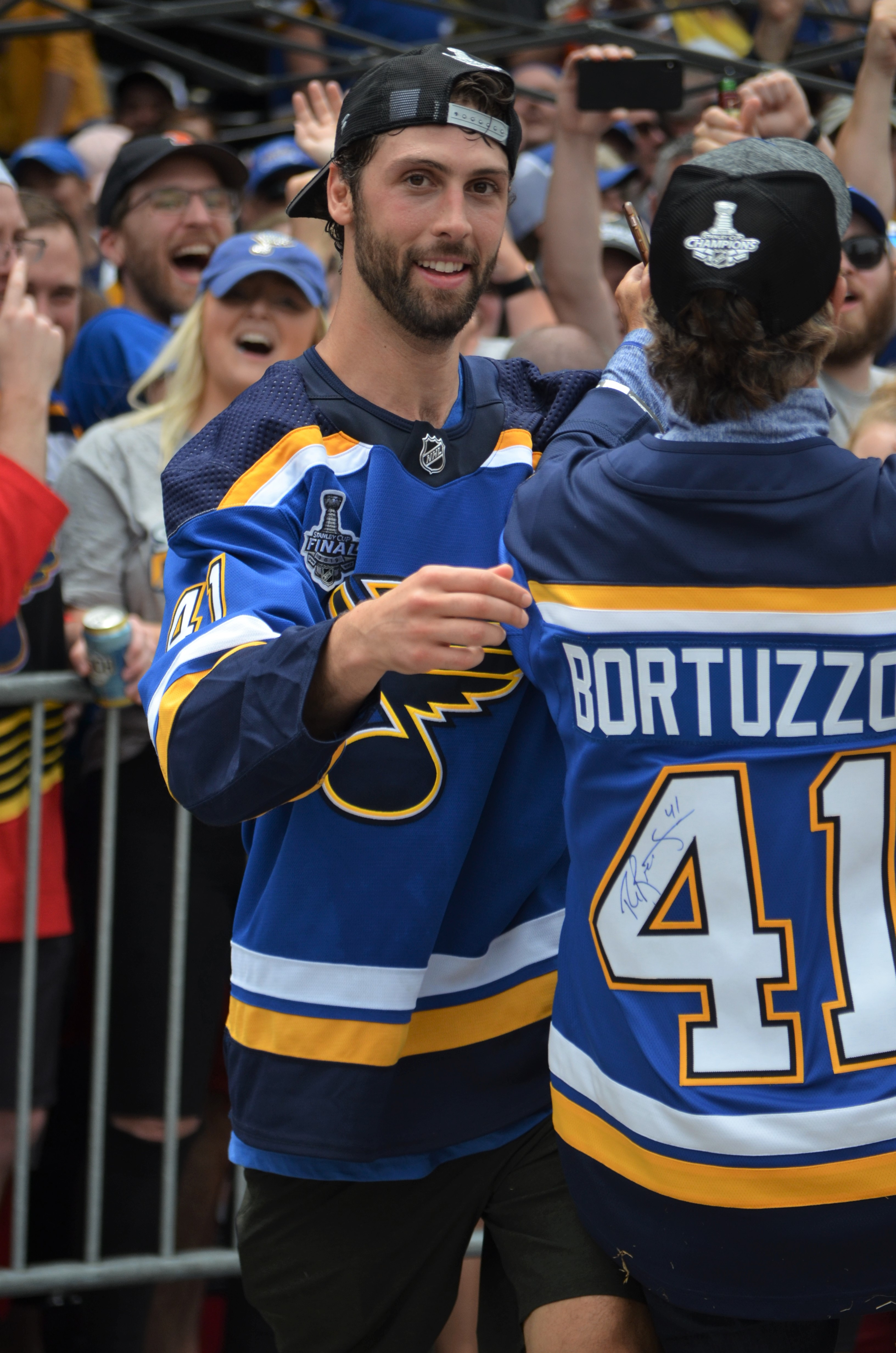
Bortuzzo during the 2019 Stanley Cup parade

During a pre-season game prior to the 2018–19 season, Bortuzzo elbowed Washington Capitals defenceman Michal Kempný and was subsequently suspended for the remainder of the pre-season and one regular-season game. Upon returning for the regular season, Bortuzzo suffered a lower-body injury in a game against the Toronto Maple Leafs on October 20 and was placed on injured reserve. He was eventually taken off injured reserve on November 30, 2018, more than a month after the initial injury. During a Blues practice on December 10, 2018, Bortuzzo fought teammate Zach Sanford. The two got a few punches in on one another before being separated by coaches. At the time, St. Louis had lost eight of their last 11 games. Five days later, the Blues signed Bortuzzo to a three-year, $4.125 million contract extension worth $1.375 million per season through to the end of the 2021–22 season.

By January 2019, the Blues were in last place around the entire league resulting in a coaching and goaltender change. The changes proved to be successful as Bortuzzo ended the regular season playing in 59 regular-season games and accumulating 10 points as the team qualified for the 2019 Stanley Cup playoffs. The Blues beat the Winnipeg Jets and Dallas Stars to qualify for the Western Conference Final against the San Jose Sharks. After losing in Game 1 of the Finals, the Blues and Sharks returned for Game 2 at the SAP Center, where Bortuzzo scored the game-winning goal at 16:34 of the second period in an eventual 4–2 win. The Blues ended up winning the series and met with the Boston Bruins in the 2019 Stanley Cup Final. Bortuzzo and the Blues beat the Bruins in seven games to win their first Stanley Cup in franchise history, and become the first SIJHL alumni to do so. Although he was scratched for the final game of the series, Bortuzzo was rewarded for his efforts with a Day with the Cup.

During the 2019–20 season, Bortuzzo continued to improve his play while in the Blues' line-up. In a game against the Calgary Flames on November 21, 2019, Bortuzzo played a season-high 17:52 of ice time and earned a plus-five rating in the 5–0 win. Three days later, Bortuzzo was suspended for four games by the NHL Department of Player Safety for injuring Nashville Predators winger Viktor Arvidsson by repeatedly cross-checking him. Upon returning to the Blues' line-up on December 2 against the Chicago Blackhawks, Bortuzzo commented on his suspension by saying "The temperature of the game is high at times. Again, I'm not a malicious player. I'm not out here trying to injure people and I stand by that." When the Blues met the Predators again on February 15, Bortuzzo fought twice during the game, with Arvidsson and Jarred Tinordi, as the team lost 4–3.

=== New York Islanders ===
On December 8, 2023, the Blues traded Bortuzzo to the New York Islanders in exchange for a 2024 seventh-round pick.

=== Utah Hockey Club ===
On August 31, 2024, Bortuzzo signed a one-year, two-way contract worth $775,000 with the Utah Hockey Club for the 2024–25 season. Bortuzzo was limited to just 17 regular-season games through injury, and contributed with 2 assists.

== Career statistics ==
			Regular season					Playoffs
Season	Team	League	GP	G	A	Pts	PIM	GP	G	A	Pts	PIM
2005–06	Fort William North Stars	SIJHL	40	4	18	22	137	—	—	—	—	—
2006–07	Kitchener Rangers	OHL	63	2	12	14	67	9	1	2	3	8
2007–08	Kitchener Rangers	OHL	52	3	15	18	61	18	0	8	8	14
2008–09	Kitchener Rangers	OHL	23	1	16	17	24	—	—	—	—	—
2009–10	Wilkes-Barre/Scranton Penguins	AHL	75	2	10	12	109	4	0	0	0	0
2010–11	Wilkes-Barre/Scranton Penguins	AHL	79	4	22	26	111	12	0	1	1	6
2011–12	Pittsburgh Penguins	NHL	6	0	0	0	2	—	—	—	—	—
2011–12	Wilkes-Barre/Scranton Penguins	AHL	51	3	9	12	61	12	0	1	1	13
2012–13	Wilkes-Barre/Scranton Penguins	AHL	31	1	3	4	34	—	—	—	—	—
2012–13	Pittsburgh Penguins	NHL	15	2	2	4	27	—	—	—	—	—
2013–14	Pittsburgh Penguins	NHL	54	0	10	10	74	8	0	1	1	4
2014–15	Pittsburgh Penguins	NHL	38	2	4	6	68	—	—	—	—	—
2014–15	St. Louis Blues	NHL	13	1	1	2	25	—	—	—	—	—
2015–16	St. Louis Blues	NHL	40	2	1	3	52	5	0	1	1	2
2016–17	St. Louis Blues	NHL	38	1	3	4	15	10	0	0	0	4
2017–18	St. Louis Blues	NHL	72	4	9	13	41	—	—	—	—	—
2018–19	St. Louis Blues	NHL	59	2	8	10	47	17	2	0	2	30
2019–20	St. Louis Blues	NHL	42	2	4	6	21	3	0	0	0	0
2020–21	St. Louis Blues	NHL	40	1	4	5	47	2	0	0	0	0
2021–22	St. Louis Blues	NHL	73	1	5	6	36	10	0	0	0	6
2022–23	St. Louis Blues	NHL	43	2	3	5	29	—	—	—	—	—
2023–24	St. Louis Blues	NHL	4	0	0	0	7	—	—	—	—	—
2023–24	New York Islanders	NHL	23	0	0	0	20	5	0	1	1	14
2024–25	Utah Hockey Club	NHL	17	0	2	2	22	—	—	—	—	—
NHL totals			577	20	56	76	533	60	2	3	5	60

== Awards and honours ==
Award	Year	Ref
AHL
All-Star Game	2011	
NHL
Stanley Cup champion	2019	
