= 2007 Royal Bank Cup =

Tournament details
- Venue: CN Centre in Prince George, British Columbia
- Dates: May 5, 2007 – May 13, 2007
- Teams: 5

Final positions
- Champions: Aurora Tigers (2nd title)
- Runners-up: Prince George Spruce Kings

Tournament statistics
- Games played: 13
- Scoring leader: Daniel Michalsky (10 pts.) (Aurora)

Awards
- MVP: Daniel Michalsky (Aurora)

The 2007 Royal Bank Cup is the 37th Junior "A" 2007 ice hockey National Championship for the Canadian Junior A Hockey League. The 2007 National Champions were the Aurora Tigers, winning their second title in four years.

The Royal Bank Cup was competed for by the winners of the Doyle Cup, Anavet Cup, Dudley Hewitt Cup, the Fred Page Cup and the host city, the Prince George Spruce Kings of the British Columbia Hockey League.

The tournament was hosted by the Prince George Spruce Kings and ran in May 2007 with games played at the CN Centre in Prince George, British Columbia.

The defending 2006 champions were the Burnaby Express of the British Columbia Hockey League, but they failed to make it out of their league playdowns. This year's frontrunners were the Camrose Kodiaks and the Aurora Tigers. The Kodiaks were the top ranked team in the CJAHL for the first part of the season, while the Tigers were the nation's top team from the point that Camrose gave it up until now. The Pembroke Lumber Kings dominated the Central league and squeaked out of the regionals, while being known as a dangerous team they are still looking for their first National Title. The Selkirk Steelers are a tough team and have been thought to be a contender since early in the season. The host Prince George Spruce Kings should be well rested for the competition after a month off since being eliminated, the host is rarely not a factor at the Royal Bank Cup.

Aurora Tigers - 2007 Royal Bank Cup Champions

== Details ==
The tournament opened up on May 5, 2007. The first game took place between Prince George and Pembroke. Pembroke came out strong, but the first period closed out with a 1–1 tie. Prince George took control in the second, running up three goals, and eventually took the game 5–2. Historically, it is not uncommon for a well rested host team to surprise any of the four war-torn and jet-lagged regional champions at the Royal Bank Cup. Since the first Royal Bank Cup was awarded in 1996, the host team has won the championship four times in eleven tries.

On May 6, the Aurora Tigers started their tourney off strong, taking an early 3–0 lead against the Selkirk Steelers. The Tigers ran into some penalty troubles, but the game still ended up 4–2 in their favour. In the late game, Prince George came out strong against the Camrose Kodiaks and took an early 2–0 lead. The Kodiaks put on the heat in the second and from that point on scored four unanswered goals to take the game 4–2.

Day 3: May 7. The early game was between the Aurora Tigers and the Pembroke Lumber Kings. Aurora came out strong and took an early lead, but ran into rather lopsided penalty trouble and found themselves down 3–1 in the third. The Pembroke lead corresponded with a string of nine minor penalties, eight of which were given to the Tigers. The Tigers roared back to tie it at 3 late in the third, just to allow another Pembroke goal and then later a Pembroke empty netter. The Lumber Kings proved their worth with a 5–3 victory over the nation's top ranked team, although inconsistent refereeing may have also been a factor. Despite a hard-fought game and a great effort, the Selkirk Steelers were topped 3-1 by the Camrose Kodiaks.

On Day 4, three teams got to rest, but not Prince George and Aurora. Both teams coming off losses, this game was undeniably important. Despite outshooting the Tigers, the Spruce Kings were just out-gunned and were defeated by a 6–3 score.

May 8 started off with a duel between Camrose and Pembroke. Pembroke, flying high from a victory over top seated Aurora, ran into a brick wall and were shut down 3-0 by the Kodiaks. The late game was between Prince George and Selkirk. A win for either team would guarantee a semi-final spot for the victor. The game remained scoreless until the third where Prince George squeezed out a 2–1 victory. With the win Prince George clinched a playoff spot with a 2–2 record.

On the final day of the round robin came the much anticipated showdown between the top seeded Aurora Tigers and the second seeded Camrose Kodiaks. The Tigers jumped out to an early 2–0 lead, just to lose it on a pair of quick power-play goals by the Kodiaks. The Tiger went up 4–2 in the second. In the third it was very back and forth, but the Tigers out scored them in rather violent third period 3–2 to win the game 7–4. This may be the preview for a much anticipated rematch in the championship game. With the win, the Tigers climbed to 3–1 to clinch the top seed and the Kodiaks dropped to 3-1 and due to a tie breaker are relegated to 2nd seed and a semi-final against Prince George. Camrose chose to start back-up goaltender Keanan Boomer in the game while Aurora chose to stay the course with starter Tyler Gordon. Boomer had only played in one game since the end of the regular season up to this point. In the final game of the round robin, it was winner move on, loser go home. Pembroke and Selkirk battled it out in a tight and hard-fought game. Despite the Steelers outshooting the Lumber Kings, the Kings won 4–2. This sets up a rematch for Aurora and Pembroke in the Semi-final.

After a days rest, May 12 was semi-final day at the RBC tournament. The early game was 1st seed Aurora in a rematch against the only team to beat them in the round robin, 4th seed Pembroke. Part two of the battle of Ontario saw Pembroke carrying a 2–1 lead late in the second period. With less than 3 minutes to go in the second, Aurora knotted the game at 2 and a scoreless third forced an overtime period. At 2:21 of the overtime period tournament MVP Daniel Michalsky popped in a rebound to win the game for the Tigers.

The second semi-final was between 2nd seed Camrose and 3rd seed Prince George. Alain Joanette got Prince George on the board first, snapping a shot past Kodiaks goaltender Allen York almost 15 minutes into the opening period, and Vinny Muchalla got his first of the tournament three minutes into the middle frame on a controversial goal, putting the Spruce Kings up by a pair halfway through the game. The goal came as Muchalla slid into the net and knocked the net off the moorings, and the ref blew the whistle and had his arm in the air, calling the play dead. Then the puck was shot in the net and the ref called it a goal. Joe Colborne got the Kodiaks to within one just past the midway point of the second period, finishing off a beautiful set-up from linemates Scott Kobialko and Mike Connolly on a Camrose power play. After being stoned on numerous chances by the Spruce Kings' goalie Jordan White for more than 18 minutes in the third period, Jesse Todd undressed a Prince George defender and had a little breakaway, blasting a highlight reel goal past White, pulling the Kodiaks even with just 1:51 to go.

The game ended up being the longest game in Royal Bank Cup history at 146 minutes and 1 second as the Spruce Kings broke a 2–2 tie just over six minutes into the fifth overtime period to win 3-2 and clinch a berth in the RBC Cup Final against the Aurora Tigers. Jason Yuel of the Spruce Kings scored the winner while goaltender Jordan White stopped 91 of 93 shots for the victory.

The final was a nail-biter to the end. The Tigers were up 1–0 at the end of the first and 2–0 at the end of the second. Both teams were tired and in their sixth game of the tournament, but hitting was heavy and both teams battled hard. The Tigers scored early in the third on the power play, and the Spruce Kings scored with less than five minutes to play to keep the game close and interesting. The Tigers shut them down from there and clinched their second national title in four years. The Tigers finished the season with a record of 73 wins, 10 losses, and 1 tie and allowed no one to play spoiler on them from regular season game one, through the playoffs, the Dudley Hewitt Cup, or the Royal Bank Cup.

== Tournament ==
=== Round robin ===
| Pos | League (Ticket) | Team | Pld | W | L | GF | GA | GD | Qualification |
|---|---|---|---|---|---|---|---|---|---|
| 1 | OPJHL (Dudley Hewitt Cup) | Aurora Tigers | 4 | 3 | 1 | 20 | 14 | +6 | Semi-final |
| 2 | AJHL (Doyle Cup) | Camrose Kodiaks | 4 | 3 | 1 | 14 | 10 | +4 | Semi-final |
| 3 | BCHL (Host) | Prince George Spruce Kings | 4 | 2 | 2 | 12 | 13 | −1 | Semi-final |
| 4 | CJHL (Fred Page Cup) | Pembroke Lumber Kings | 4 | 2 | 2 | 11 | 13 | −2 | Semi-final |
| 5 | MJHL (Anavet Cup) | Selkirk Steelers | 4 | 0 | 4 | 6 | 13 | −7 | |

==== Results ====
Round-robin results
| Game | Team | Score | Team | Score | Notes |
|---|---|---|---|---|---|
| 1 | Pembroke | 2 | Prince George | 5 | Final - Shots: 43-24 S. Kings |
| 2 | Aurora | 4 | Selkirk | 2 | Final - Shots: 36-28 Tigers |
| 3 | Prince George | 2 | Camrose | 4 | Final - Shots: 33-28 Kodiaks |
| 4 | Aurora | 3 | Pembroke | 5 | Final - Shots: 28-26 Tigers |
| 5 | Selkirk | 1 | Camrose | 3 | Final - Shots: 38-24 Kodiaks |
| 6 | Prince George | 3 | Aurora | 6 | Final - Shots: 32-30 S. Kings |
| 7 | Camrose | 3 | Pembroke | 0 | Final - Shots: 31-21 Kodiaks |
| 8 | Selkirk | 1 | Prince George | 2 | Final - Shots: 34-34 Even |
| 9 | Camrose | 4 | Aurora | 7 | Final - Shots: 36-30 Kodiaks |
| 10 | Pembroke | 4 | Selkirk | 2 | Final - Shots: 33-27 Steelers |

=== Semi-final ===
Semi-final Results
| Game | Team | Score | Team | Score | Notes |
|---|---|---|---|---|---|
| 11 | Aurora | 3 | Pembroke | 2 | OT Final - Shots: 27-26 Tigers |
| 12 | Camrose | 2 | Prince George | 3 | 5OT Final - Shots: 93-77 Kodiaks |

=== Final ===
RBC Final Results
| Game | Team | Score | Team | Score | Notes |
|---|---|---|---|---|---|
| 13 | Aurora | 3 | Prince George | 1 | Final - Shots: 31-22 Tigers |

== Awards ==
Roland Mercier Trophy (Tournament MVP): Daniel Michalsky (Aurora Tigers)
Top Scorer (round robin): Scott Kobialko (Camrose Kodiaks) and Daniel Michalsky (Aurora Tigers)
Top Forward: Daniel Michalsky (Aurora Tigers)
Top Defencemen: Evan Oberg (Camrose Kodiaks)
Top Goaltender: Allen York (Camrose Kodiaks)
Tubby Smaltz Trophy (Sportsmanship): Joe Colborne (Camrose Kodiaks)

== Roll of League Champions ==
AJHL: Camrose Kodiaks
BCHL: Nanaimo Clippers
CJHL: Pembroke Lumber Kings
MJHL: Selkirk Steelers
MJAHL: Truro Bearcats
NOJHL: Soo Indians
OPJHL: Aurora Tigers
QJAAAHL: Joliette Action
SJHL: Humboldt Broncos
SIJHL: Schreiber Diesels

== See also ==
- Canadian Junior A Hockey League
- Royal Bank Cup
- Anavet Cup
- Doyle Cup
- Dudley Hewitt Cup
- Fred Page Cup
- 2007 in ice hockey
