= Carter Hutton =

Canadian ice hockey player (born 1985)

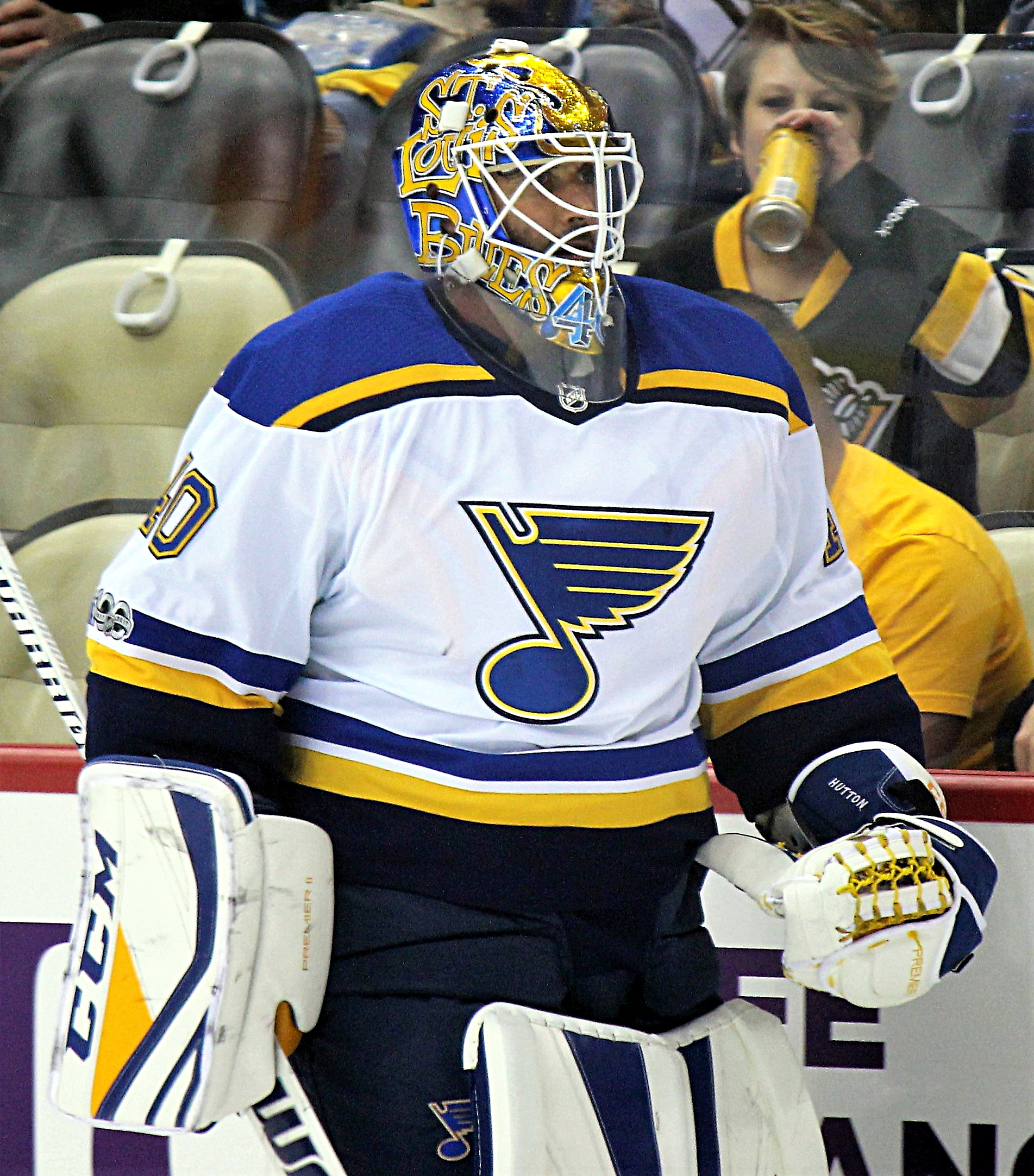
- Hutton with the St. Louis Blues in 2017
- Born: December 19, 1985 (age 40) Thunder Bay, Ontario, Canada
- Height: 6 ft 1 in (185 cm)
- Weight: 195 lb (88 kg; 13 st 13 lb)
- Position: Goaltender
- Caught: Left
- Played for: Chicago Blackhawks; Nashville Predators; St. Louis Blues; Buffalo Sabres; Arizona Coyotes
- NHL draft: Undrafted
- Playing career: 2010–2022

Carter John Hutton (born December 19, 1985) is a Canadian former professional ice hockey goaltender. He played in the National Hockey League (NHL) with the Chicago Blackhawks, Nashville Predators, St. Louis Blues, Buffalo Sabres and the Arizona Coyotes.

== Early life ==
Hutton was born on December 19, 1985, in Thunder Bay, Ontario, to parents John and Linda Hutton. Growing up, his father worked as a construction foreman.

== Playing career ==
=== Junior ===
Hutton played four seasons in the Superior International Junior Hockey League (SIJHL) and holds the league record for most shutouts in a season with 10, which he set during the 2005–06 SIJHL season while playing for the Fort William North Stars.

=== Professional ===
On March 26, 2010, Hutton was signed by the Philadelphia Flyers after his season in college at UMass Lowell was over. He played in four games for the Flyers American Hockey League (AHL) affiliate, the Adirondack Phantoms, and dressed in several for the Flyers as Brian Boucher's backup after being called up while Johan Backlund was out with an injury.

On June 1, 2010, Hutton was signed by the San Jose Sharks as an unrestricted free agent.

==== Chicago Blackhawks ====
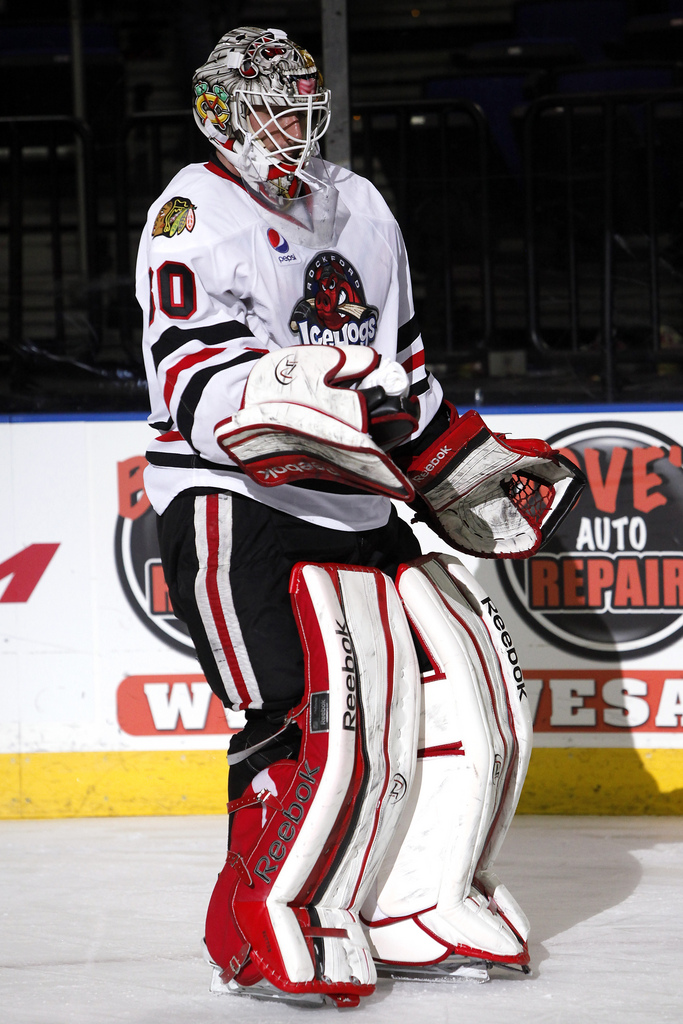
Hutton with the Rockford IceHogs

On August 1, 2011, the Rockford IceHogs signed Hutton to a one-year AHL contract. During the 2011–12 season, on February 23, 2012, the Chicago Blackhawks signed Hutton to a one-year, two-way contract for the remainder of the campaign. On March 26, 2012, the Blackhawks called Hutton up to temporarily replace goaltender Ray Emery, who was out due to an illness. On April 27, 2013, he made his first NHL start against the St. Louis Blues. The Blackhawks went on to win the Stanley Cup, and Hutton was given a championship ring. He did not qualify to be engraved on the Stanley Cup and was left off the team picture.

==== Nashville Predators ====
On July 5, 2013, Hutton left the Blackhawks organization and signed a one-year, two-way deal with the Nashville Predators. He eventually became the Predators' starting goalie for most of the 2013–14 NHL season and posted a 20–11–4 record after Pekka Rinne suffered a hip infection. By December, Hutton compiled a 3-0-0 record with a 1.33 goals-against average and .960 save percentage to earn the NHL Third Star of the Week. Following a five-game winning streak at the end of the regular season, Hutton became the sixth 20-game winner in franchise history. On June 2, 2014, Hutton signed a two-year, $1.45 million contract to remain with the team.

In his final year with the Predators, Hutton was the teams' 2016 Bill Masterton Memorial Trophy nominee as a "player who best exemplifies the qualities of perseverance, sportsmanship, and dedication to hockey."

==== St. Louis Blues ====
After three seasons with the Predators as the backup to Rinne, Hutton left as a free agent to sign a two-year contract with the St. Louis Blues on July 1, 2016. Prior to the start of the season, Hutton earned praise from head coach Ken Hitchcock who called him "one of the best players during training camp." He made his debut with the team on October 15, where he made 33 saves for a 3–2 win over the New York Rangers. Prior to playing for the Blues during the 2017 NHL Winter Classic, Hutton designed his goaltending mask with various St. Louis markers such as the St. Louis Cardinals' redbird, a large Blue Note, and sketches of Cardinal legends. In recognition of his mask, the family of Stan Musial sent him a signed baseball. Later that month, Hutton earned his fifth career NHL shutout after making 23 saves in a 4–0 win against the San Jose Sharks on January 15. A few games later, he earned his sixth shutout in a 3–0 win over the Pittsburgh Penguins seventh against the Philadelphia Flyers, and eighth against the Detroit Red Wings to tie for sixth in the NHL. As a result of his play, Hutton helped the Blues move into third place in the Central Division and qualify for the 2017 Stanley Cup playoffs.

In his second season with the Blues in 2017–18, Hutton enjoyed a career year in establishing himself as one of the premier backups in the league. He led the NHL in save percentage (.931) and goals-against average (2.09) in 32 games, earning starts from Blues starting goaltender Jake Allen.

==== Buffalo Sabres ====
Having concluded his two-year deal with the Blues, Hutton agreed to a three-year, $8.25 million contract with the Buffalo Sabres on July 1, 2018. Following the signing, Hutton was praised by Buffalo's goaltending coach for being "an ideal partner for Linus Ullmark." He earned his first win with the Sabres on October 6, 2018, in a 3–1 win over the New York Rangers. Following the win, Hutton was the Sabres' starting goaltender until October 13, against the Arizona Coyotes. He returned as the starter for the Sabres by November and helped them win four consecutive regular season games for the first time since December 2014. Hutton finished his first season with the Sabres organization with an 18–25–5 record as they failed to qualify for the playoffs.

Hutton returned to the Sabres for the 2019–20 season where he shared the net with Ullmark once again. Early in the season, Hutton earned his first shutout as a starter for the Sabres in a 4–0 win over the Dallas Stars on October 14. A few days later, he set a franchise record for most saves during a regular-season game with 47 made during a shutout of the Los Angeles Kings. As a result of these shutouts, Hutton led league goaltenders in save percentage, goals-against average, and even-strength save percentage. He was subsequently named the NHL's Third Star of the Week for the week ending on October 21, 2019.

Following his back-to-back shutouts, Hutton had failed to win a game and was replaced as team starter on December 19 following a 6–1 loss. Since that game, Ullmark started the team's next eight games before Hutton was named the starter again on January 11, 2020. However, Hutton made 29 saves in the 6–3 loss to the Vancouver Canucks. After posting a 0-8-4 record from October 24 through January 30, it was discovered that Hutton was suffering from a vision problem. He was again replaced by Ullmark as the team's starter before he was injured during a game against the Ottawa Senators in late January. Due to this injury, Hutton was appointed the starter with rookie Jonas Johansson as his backup. He finished the regular season with a 12–14–4 record in 31 appearances and a career-low goals-against average and save percentage.

Hutton returned to the Sabres for his final time during the 2020–21 season. He was limited to only 13 games during the season, posting a 3.47 goals against average and an .886 save percentage. His final season was derailed by a significant ankle injury.

==== Arizona Coyotes ====
After a largely disappointing tenure with the Sabres organization, Hutton left as a free agent and was signed to a one-year, league-minimum $750,000 contract with the Arizona Coyotes on July 28, 2021. Hutton appeared in three games to start the 2021–22 season, before suffering a knee injury against the Florida Panthers on October 25, 2021. After a long rehabilitation, Hutton attempted to resurrect his career but re-injured his surgically repaired ankle. He was placed on waivers and after clearing them, was reassigned to Phoenix's AHL affiliate, the Tucson Roadrunners on February 21, 2022.

==== Toronto Maple Leafs ====
On the same day as his reassignment to the Roadrunners, Hutton was traded by the Coyotes to the Toronto Maple Leafs in exchange for future considerations. He agreed to the trade after assurances of remaining with his family and continuing on loan from the Maple Leafs with the Tucson Roadrunners. He was later reassigned to join the Toronto Marlies of the AHL, however did not feature in a game for the remainder of the season. On June 14, 2022, Hutton announced his retirement from professional ice hockey after 12 seasons.

== Personal life ==
Hutton and his wife Stacey have two children together, a son and a daughter. In 2021, Stacey won a $50,000 jackpot after buying the winning Quest for Gold Crossword game ticket.

== Career statistics ==
			Regular season									Playoffs
Season	Team	League	GP	W	L	T/OT	MIN	GA	SO	GAA	SV%	GP	W	L	MIN	GA	SO	GAA	SV%
2003–04	Thunder Bay Golden Hawks	SIJHL	29	1	18	3	1389	125	0	5.40	.876	—	—	—	—	—	—	—	—
2004–05	Thunder Bay Golden Hawks	SIJHL	19	7	10	0	1006	75	0	4.47	.884	—	—	—	—	—	—	—	—
2004–05	Fort William North Stars	SIJHL	10	10	0	0	599	13	2	1.30	.930	—	—	—	—	—	—	—	—
2005–06	Fort William North Stars	SIJHL	36	33	1	0	2053	63	10	1.84	.926	15	12	3	928	36	2	2.33	.928
2006–07	UMass-Lowell	HE	19	3	10	5	1097	52	1	2.84	.889	—	—	—	—	—	—	—	—
2007–08	UMass-Lowell	HE	20	7	11	2	1187	49	2	2.48	.909	—	—	—	—	—	—	—	—
2008–09	UMass-Lowell	HE	19	9	8	1	1106	38	3	2.06	.916	—	—	—	—	—	—	—	—
2009–10	UMass-Lowell	HE	27	13	12	2	1614	55	4	2.04	.928	—	—	—	—	—	—	—	—
2009–10	Adirondack Phantoms	AHL	4	1	2	1	244	11	0	2.71	.921	—	—	—	—	—	—	—	—
2010–11	Worcester Sharks	AHL	22	11	7	2	1174	59	2	3.01	.902	—	—	—	—	—	—	—	—
2011–12	Toledo Walleye	ECHL	14	7	7	0	819	43	0	3.15	.900	—	—	—	—	—	—	—	—
2011–12	Rockford IceHogs	AHL	43	22	13	4	2372	93	3	2.35	.917	—	—	—	—	—	—	—	—
2012–13	Rockford IceHogs	AHL	51	26	22	1	2908	132	2	2.72	.908	—	—	—	—	—	—	—	—
2012–13	Chicago Blackhawks	NHL	1	0	1	0	59	3	0	3.05	.893	—	—	—	—	—	—	—	—
2013–14	Nashville Predators	NHL	40	20	11	4	2085	91	1	2.62	.910	—	—	—	—	—	—	—	—
2014–15	Nashville Predators	NHL	18	6	7	4	1010	44	1	2.61	.902	—	—	—	—	—	—	—	—
2015–16	Nashville Predators	NHL	17	7	5	4	979	38	2	2.33	.918	3	0	0	20	1	0	3.01	.667
2016–17	St. Louis Blues	NHL	30	13	8	2	1460	58	4	2.39	.913	—	—	—	—	—	—	—	—
2017–18	St. Louis Blues	NHL	32	17	7	3	1610	56	3	2.09	.931	—	—	—	—	—	—	—	—
2018–19	Buffalo Sabres	NHL	50	18	25	5	2840	142	0	3.00	.908	—	—	—	—	—	—	—	—
2019–20	Buffalo Sabres	NHL	31	12	14	4	1776	94	2	3.18	.898	—	—	—	—	—	—	—	—
2020–21	Buffalo Sabres	NHL	13	1	10	1	675	39	0	3.47	.886	—	—	—	—	—	—	—	—
2021–22	Arizona Coyotes	NHL	3	0	2	0	116	15	0	7.76	.741	—	—	—	—	—	—	—	—
NHL totals			235	94	90	27	12,608	580	13	2.76	.908	3	0	0	20	1	0	3.01	.667

== Awards and honours ==
Award	Year
College
All-HE Second Team	2009–10
NCAA (New England) D1 All-Star	2009–10

Awards and achievements
Preceded by Brad Thiessen	Hockey East Goaltending Champion; 2009–10	Succeeded by John Muse
