= Duluth Clydesdales =

- City: Duluth, Minnesota, United States
- League: Superior International Junior Hockey League
- Founded: July 12, 2010
- Folded: 2013
- Home arena: Duluth Heritage Sports Center
- Colors: Black, Steel, Red, and White
- General manager: Butch Williams

The Duluth Clydesdales were an American Junior ice hockey team based in Duluth, Minnesota. They are former members of the Canadian-based Superior International Junior Hockey League.

== History ==
The Duluth Clydesdales applied for entry into the Superior International Junior Hockey League in the Summer of 2010 along with the Wisconsin Mustangs of the Minnesota Junior Hockey League. Both teams were summarily rejected by the USA Hockey Junior Hockey Council, but after an appeal to the USA Hockey Appeals Council, the decision was overturned. The Clydesdales became official members of the SIJHL on July 12, 2010.

On September 16, 2010, the Clydesdales played their first ever regular season game, on the road, against the Sioux Lookout Flyers. Sioux Lookout won the game 6-1. On September 24, 2010, the Clydesdales won their first ever game, while on the road, defeating the Dryden Ice Dogs 4-1. On October 3, 2010, the Clydesdales played their first ever home game. They dropped the game 5-4 in a shootout to the Wisconsin Wilderness. The game also marked the first regulation game in the SIJHL where both the home and away teams were American.

Clydesdales goaltender Cody Stocker (2010).

Their first home win came on October 10, 2010, a 4-3 win over the Dryden Ice Dogs.

The 2012-13 season began with much controversy. The defending champion Wilderness decided to relocate from Spooner, Wisconsin to Cloquet, Minnesota. Cloquet is within Duluth's metropolitan area. The move was approved by both the league and USA Hockey, leaving the weaker Clydesdales organization fighting for local talent, fans, and player personnel against the tuition-free league champions. The Clydesdales barely had enough players to start the season and only put up two wins in thirty-six league games. After having to cancel a road trip for the second time that season due to player injuries and the movement of players to the Amateur Athletic Union's Western States Hockey League, the league voted to remove them as league members on January 19, 2013 and confirmed that vote on January 20, 2013. The team claims to have had enough players to field a team and was still expecting to stay financially afloat, but the league feared the opposite.

== Season-by-Season Results ==
| Season | GP | W | L | T | OTL | GF | GA | P | Results | Playoffs |
| 2010-11 | 56 | 11 | 41 | - | 4 | 127 | 261 | 26 | 6th SIJHL | Lost quarter-final |
| 2011-12 | 56 | 20 | 33 | - | 3 | 200 | 247 | 43 | 6th SIJHL | Lost quarter-final |
| 2012-13 | 36 | 2 | 32 | - | 2 | 94 | 212 | 6 | 6th SIJHL | Suspended from play |

=== Playoffs ===
- 2011 Lost quarter-final

Dryden Ice Dogs defeated Duluth Clydesdales 4-games-to-none

- 2012 Lost quarter-final

Duluth Clydesdales defeated Iron Range Ironheads 2-games-to-none
Thunder Bay North Stars defeated Duluth Clydesdales 4-games-to-none
