= Chris Hoffman =

Zimbabwean/Canadian actor

- Born: Christopher Thomas Hoffman; Harare, Zimbabwe
- Occupation: Actor
- Years active: 1999–present

Christopher Thomas Hoffman is a Zimbabwe/Canada actor. He is best known for the roles in the films Lions for Lambs, Molly's Game and Saints & Sinners.

== Personal life ==
He was born on in Harare, Zimbabwe. He has a twin brother, Matthew Hoffman who is also an actor.

== Filmography ==
Year	Film	Role	Genre	Ref.
1999	Joan of Arc	Louis	TV mini-series	
2000	Wildflower	Dennis Hobbs	Film	
2000	Gilmore Girls	Matt	TV series	
2002	Pavement	Detective Kecker	V Movie	
2003	Line of Fire	Store Supervisor	TV series	
2003	30:13	Watcher	Short film	
2004	Knuckle Sandwich	Office Dork	Film	
2004	Creature Unknown	Steve	Film	
2007	Saints & Sinners	Simon Pierce	TV series	
2007	Lions for Lambs	Bully Dog	Film	
2009	Flashpoint	Jimmy Cooper	TV series	
2009	Hangman	Gus	Film	
2011	Lost Girl	Hamish	TV series	
2013	Nurse 3D	Married Man / Fred	Film	
2013	Played	Shaun Devlin	TV series	
2014	Saving Hope	John Doe Patient	TV series	
2015	Murdoch Mysteries	Bernie King	TV series	
2016	Killjoys	Creepy Interrogator	Short film	
2016	The Smoke	Perfect Man	Short film	
2017	Molly's Game	Derrick	Film	
2017	Backstage	Mr. Park	TV series	
2017	The Girlfriend Experience		TV series	
