= Dakota College at Bottineau Lumberjacks men's ice hockey =

Ice hockey team of Dakota College

Dakota College-Bottineau Lumberjacks
- City: Bottineau, North Dakota
- League: National Junior College Athletic Association
- Founded: 1975
- Home arena: Bottineau Community Arena
- Colors: Green, Black, and White
- Head coach: Travis Rybchinski (2001-present)

Championships
- NJCAA titles: 1986, 1991, 1998, 2003, 2007, 2008, 2009, 2010, 2016, 2017

The Dakota College at Bottineau Lumberjacks Ice Hockey are a Junior Collegiate ice hockey team from Bottineau, North Dakota. The Lumberjacks are one of seven sanctioned sports at Dakota College at Bottineau, a member of the National Junior College Athletic Association (NJCAA).

The Lumberjacks play their home games at the 800-seat Bottineau Community Arena, also referred to as the Lumberdome.

Dakota College play roughly a 30-game season schedule against NJCAA opponents, and various ACHA, NCAA Division III teams, college JV teams, and Jr. A teams.

== History ==
The Lumberjacks have won the NJCAA National Championships ten times: 1986, 1991, 1998, 2003, 2007, 2008, 2009, 2010, 2016, and 2017.

During the 2005–06 season, the team participated in the Junior A Superior International Junior Hockey League.

== Notable alumni ==
- Ryan Bartle (2005–06) - Twin City Cyclones (SPHL), Mississippi Surge (SPHL)
- Jed Johnsen (2007–09) - Evansville Icemen (AAHL), Queen City Storm (AAHL)
- Dustin Penner (2000–02) - AHL, NHL
- Pierre Sörensson (2008–10) - Töreboda HF (Sweden 2nd tier)
- Caesar Dall'Ara (2011–12)- Sc Auer Aurorafrogs (Italy 2nd Tier)
