= 2006 Royal Bank Cup =

Tournament details
- Venue(s): Powerade Centre in Brampton, Ontario
- Dates: May 6, 2006 – May 14, 2006
- Teams: 5

Final positions
- Champions: Burnaby Express (1st title)
- Runners-up: Yorkton Terriers

Tournament statistics
- Games played: 13
- Scoring leader: Dennis Morrison (Fort William)

Awards
- MVP: David Wilson (Streetsville)

The 2006 Royal Bank Cup was the 36th Junior "A" 2006 ice hockey National Championship for the Canadian Junior A Hockey League.

The Royal Bank Cup was competed for by the winners of the Doyle Cup, Anavet Cup, Dudley Hewitt Cup, the Fred Page Cup and the host city, the Streetsville Derbys of the Ontario Provincial Junior A Hockey League, with teams from the Alberta Junior Hockey League, British Columbia Hockey League, Central Junior A Hockey League, Manitoba Junior Hockey League, Maritime Junior A Hockey League, Northern Ontario Junior Hockey League, OPJHL, Quebec Junior AAA Hockey League, Saskatchewan Junior Hockey League, and Superior International Junior Hockey League.

The tournament was hosted by the Streetsville Derbys and ran from May 6 until May 14, 2006 with games played at the Powerade Centre in Brampton, Ontario.

== Details ==
The Burnaby Express won the tournament on May 14 against the Yorkton Terriers, 8-2, in the Royal Bank Cup final. Burnaby almost did not make it to the final as they were down 2-0 to the Fort William North Stars in the first of two tournament semi-finals. With just 1:53 to go in the game, Mark Santorelli of the Express broke the shutout bid by the North Stars' goalie Carter Hutton. The Express put on extreme pressure in the 3rd period, and with a their final chance, with 11 seconds to go, Express 16-year-old stand-out Kyle Turris scored to tie the game. Turris' goal was on the team's 24th shot of the third period. The comeback rally was too much for the North Stars as the Express' Mark Soares scored the game clincher 6:19 into Overtime. By far the best player of the game was Fort William's goaltender Carter Hutton who held the eventual champions scoreless for over 58 minutes and stopped 44 of 47 shots.

In the Championship game, the Express came out with 3 quick goals in the first period and at one point were up 6-0 over Yorkton in the middle of the second period. Kyle Turris stole the show for Burnaby with a hat-trick and often skated circles around Yorkton's defense. The Express were clearly dominant throughout the Final, but the Terriers did make it interesting when they scored 2 quick goals near the end of the second period. The Express iced it halfway through the third with another 2 quick goals, and held the Terriers down until time expired.

Turris was the tournament's leading scorer (combined totals) with 7 goals and 6 assists in 6 games and scored the tourney's only hat-trick. Dennis Morrison of Fort William was the round robin scoring leader with 3 goals, 5 assists in 4 games. Burnaby held Morrison to a single assist in the semi-final game, possibly the reason for the demise of an impressive Fort William squad.

== The playoffs ==
=== Round robin ===
Pos	League (Ticket)	Team	Pld	W	L	GF	GA	GD	Qualification
1	OPJHL (Host)	Streetsville Derbys	4	3	1	10	10	0	Semi-final
2	BCHL (Doyle Cup)	Burnaby Express	4	3	1	15	11	+4	Semi-final
3	SIJHL (Dudley Hewitt Cup)	Fort William North Stars	4	2	2	10	10	0	Semi-final
4	SJHL (Anavet Cup)	Yorkton Terriers	4	1	3	8	9	−1	Semi-final
5	LHJAAAQ (Fred Page Cup)	Joliette Action	4	1	3	11	14	−3	

==== Results ====
Streetsville Derbys defeat Burnaby Express 4-3 in Overtime
Yorkton Terriers defeat Joliette Action 4-1
Streetsville Derbys defeat Fort William North Stars 3-2
Burnaby Express defeat Yorkton Terriers 4-2
Fort William North Stars defeat Joliette Action 4-3 in Overtime
Streetsville Derbys defeat Yorkton Terriers 2-1
Burnaby Express defeat Fort William North Stars 3-2
Joliette Action defeat Streetsville Derbys 4-1
Fort William North Stars defeat Yorkton Terriers 2-1
Burnaby Express defeat Joliette Action 5-3

=== Semi and Finals ===
Semi-finals
1	Streetsville Derbys	1
4	Yorkton Terriers	2
2	Burnaby Express	3
3	Fort William North Stars	2

Royal Bank Cup Finals
2	Burnaby Express	8
4	Yorkton Terriers	2

Note: Burnaby defeated Fort William in Overtime.

== Awards ==
Roland Mercier Trophy (Tournament MVP): David Wilson (Streetsville Derbys)
Top Scorer (round robin): Dennis Morrison (Fort William North Stars)
Top Forward: Chris Korchinski (Yorkton Terriers)
Top Defencemen: Peter Merth (Burnaby Express)
Top Goaltender: David Wilson (Streetsville Derbys)
Tubby Smaltz Trophy (Sportsmanship): Mark Soares (Burnaby Express)

== Roll of League Champions ==
AJHL: Fort McMurray Oil Barons
BCHL: Burnaby Express
CJHL: Hawkesbury Hawks
MJHL: Winnipeg South Blues
MJAHL: Woodstock Slammers
NOJHL: Sudbury Jr. Wolves
OPJHL: St. Michael's Buzzers
QJAAAHL: Joliette Action
SJHL: Yorkton Terriers
SIJHL: Fort William North Stars

== See also ==
- Canadian Junior A Hockey League
- Royal Bank Cup
- Anavet Cup
- Doyle Cup
- Dudley Hewitt Cup
- Fred Page Cup
