= Rod Aldoff =

Canadian professional hockey player (born 1971)

- Born: January 30, 1971 (age 55) Lethbridge, Alberta, Canada
- Height: 5 ft 10 in (178 cm)
- Weight: 195 lb (88 kg; 13 st 13 lb)
- Position: Defence
- Shot: Left
- Played for: ECHL; Tallahassee Tiger Sharks; Pee Dee Pride; Greensboro Generals; Pensacola Ice Pilots; WCHL; San Diego Gulls; IHL; Utah Grizzlies; Long Beach Ice Dogs; Bloomington Prairie Thunder; Kalamazoo Wings; Chicago Hounds; UHL; Rockford IceHogs; Chicago Hounds; CHL; Amarillo Gorillas; Rapid City Rush
- NHL draft: Undrafted
- Playing career: 1995–2010

Rod Aldoff (born January 30, 1971) is a Canadian former professional hockey player. He is currently the head coach of the Pensacola Ice Flyers of the SPHL.

== Early and personal life ==
Rod Aldoff was born in Canada on January 30, 1971, but has lived in Minnesota since college. He is now married to Kari and has two children, Liam and Leandra.

== Playing career ==
=== College hockey ===
Aldoff played for the University of Minnesota at Duluth during all four of his college years. In his freshman season with Minnesota, Aldoff played 23 games accumulating 1 goal, 8 assists, and 25 penalty minutes. In his second season for Minnesota (1992–93), Aldoff played 39 games scoring 4 goals, and making 11 assists. Aldoff racked up 34 penalty minutes in his second college season. In his third season with Minnesota, Aldoff played 38 games adding 4 goals, 25 assists, and 88 penalty minutes to his record. In Aldoff's final season with the University of Minnesota, he played 36 games earning a remarkable 11 goals, 18 assists, and 80 penalty minutes.

=== Professional ===
Rod Aldoff made his professional hockey debut with the Tallahassee Tiger Sharks of the East Coast Hockey League (ECHL) in the 1995–96 season. Aldoff played 70 games with the Tiger Sharks and scored 13 goals, made 44 assists, and had 74 penalty minutes.

In his second professional season, Aldoff moved up to the International Hockey League (IHL) playing for the Utah Grizzlies. In 24 games with the Grizzlies, Aldoff had one goal, four assists and ten penalty minutes. After being released, he went to Switzerland to join the Swiss Hockey League's Ambri-Piotta for 13 games, in which he earned three goals, seven assists, and ten penalty minutes.

Aldoff made his way back to the ECHL with the Pee Dee Pride in the 1997–98 season, playing in 70 games. Aldoff racked up 12 goals, 20 assists, and 118 penalty minutes for the Pride. Aldoff played another 70 games for the Pride in the 1998–99 season and added 12 more goals, 32 more assists, and 44 more penalty minutes to his record.

Aldoff played 27 games for the West Coast Hockey League's San Diego Gulls in the 1999–2000 season, scoring four goals to accompany his 25 assists and 18 penalty minutes. Aldoff returned to the IHL for the back end of the 1999–2000 season to play for the Long Beach Ice Dogs, playing 42 games, seven goals, six assists, and 35 penalty minutes.

Aldoff started the 2001–02 season back in Europe with the Italy's Serie A WSV Sterzing Broncos. Aldoff played 29 games accumulating five goals, eight assists, and 24 penalty minutes. Aldoff then finished the season back with the San Diego Gulls for six games, scoring two goals and six penalty minutes.

In the 2002–03 season, Rod Aldoff returned to the ECHL again to play 54 games for the Greensboro Generals. In his time with the Generals, Aldoff made 9 goals, 23 assists, and had 36 penalty minutes.

Rod played his first season in the United Hockey League (UHL) for the Rockford IceHogs in 2004–05 and scored six goals, 20 assists, and 47 penalty minutes.

Aldoff played his fourth ECHL season in 2005–06 playing 41 games for the Pensacola Ice Pilots. He had eight assists and 38 penalty minutes for the Ice Pilots.

Aldoff returned the UHL to play 65 games for the Chicago Hounds in 2006–07 scoring two goals, 26 assists, and 73 penalty minutes.

Aldoff stayed in the UHL, now rebranded as a new International Hockey League, for the 2007–08 season with the Bloomington PrairieThunder. In 42 games with the PrairieThunder, Aldoff scored four goals and 15 assists while also logging 44 penalty minutes.

Aldoff then played 57 games with the IHL's Kalamazoo Wings in the 2008–09 season scoring seven goals, 23 assists, and accumulated 30 penalty minutes. Aldoff finished the 2008–09 season with Fort Wayne Komets, also of the IHL, and would eventually go on to win the IHL Championship, the first championship in his career.

He played his last season in 2009–10 in the Central Hockey League, starting with the Amarillo Gorillas and finishing with the Rapid City Rush.

== Coaching career ==
In 2012, he was named the head coach of the Minnesota Wilderness of the Superior International Junior Hockey League in which he led the team to the league championship. In 2013, he was hired as the head coach of the Pensacola Ice Flyers in the Southern Professional Hockey League and again led the team a championship in his first season. After winning his second SPHL championship in 2016, he was hired by the Edmonton Oilers to be the head coach of their ECHL affiliate, the Norfolk Admirals, for the 2016–17 season. However, the Oilers then sold the Admirals prior to the season and the new ownership relieved Aldoff of his duties after 17 games in Norfolk. He stayed on with the Oilers in a scouting capacity while he was also rehired by the Ice Flyers as head coach in February 2017. He left the Ice Flyers again at the end of the season to return to his duties with the Oilers. After Jeff Bes left the Ice Flyers following the 2017–18 season, Aldoff returned as head coach for a third time.

== Awards and honours ==
Award	Year
SPHL Coach of the Year	2013–14
