= Wisconsin Wilderness =

Northwest Express
- City: Spooner, Wisconsin
- League: USPHL
- Founded: 2013
- Folded: 2014
- Home arena: Spooner Ice House
- Colors
- Owner: Joe Dibble
- General manager: Joe Dibble
- Head coach: Joe Dibble

The Northwest Express are an American junior ice hockey team based in Spooner, Wisconsin.

== History ==
In the summer of 2012, Donnie Roberts sold the original Wisconsin Wilderness, two-time SIJHL Bill Salonen Cup champions, to parties who moved the team to Cloquet, Minnesota. Built from the success of the original Minnesota Wilderness, they won their third straight title and the Dudley Hewitt Cup as Central Canada Junior A champions. They became the second team in SIJHL history to play for the Royal Bank Cup and the first American team in Canadian Junior A history to make the final round of the national playdowns. During this time, the Wilderness announced that the team was leaving the SIJHL and joining the North American Hockey League. The Wilderness would lose their chance at the 2013 Royal Bank Cup in the semi-final, in overtime.

On July 11, 2013, USA Hockey granted Lars Geary a new team in the SIJHL. Geary chose to go back to the previous franchise's name, the "Wisconsin Wilderness".

On September 21, 2013, the Wilderness played their first franchise game. The Wilderness traveled to Dryden, Ontario, to play the Dryden Ice Dogs and lost the game, 4–1. Zach Kraft scored the first goal in Wilderness history 11:36 into the first period. Luke Thompson made 37 saves in the effort for the Wilderness. The next night was the second game of a weekend doubleheader with the Ice Dogs, as the Wilderness avenged their previous loss and picked up their first franchise win with a 6–3 triumph. Sawyer Jacobson picked up the eventual game-winning goal 5:19 into the third period, while Luke Thompson made 35 saves to pick up the historic victory. After their first season returning to the SIJHL, the Spooner Ice House closed its doors, leaving the Wisconsin Wilderness without an arena and therefore they folded.

In 2024, the USPHL announced that the Minnesota Moose franchise was being re-located, bringing junior hockey back to Spooner, Wisconsin. The team was rebranded to the Northwest Express and where placed in the Premier League, in the north division.

| Season | GP | W | L | T | OTL | GF | GA | P | Results | Playoffs |
| 2013–14 | 56 | 5 | 51 | — | 0 | 146 | 327 | 10 | 6th SIJHL | Lost quarter-final 0-4 Minnesota Iron Rangers |
USPHL - Premier
| 2024–25 | 44 | 29 | 13 | 2 | 0 | 222 | 142 | 60 | 3rd of 9 North; 23rd of 73 USPHL - Premier | Won Div Quarterfinals 2-0 (Blue Ox); Lost Div. Semifinals 1-2 (RiverKings) |
| 2024–25 | 44 | 29 | 13 | 2 | 0 | 222 | 142 | 60 | 3rd of 9 North; 23rd of 73 USPHL - Premier | Won Div Quarterfinals 2-0 (Mullets); Won Div. Semifinals 2-0 (RiverKings); Lost Div. Finals 0-2(Squatch) |

In 2019 the SIJHL welcomed Spooner back to junior hockey with the establishment of the Wisconsin Lumberjacks.

== See also ==
- Ironwood Lumberjacks
- Superior International Junior Hockey League
