= Thunder Bay Bulldogs =

- City: Thunder Bay, Ontario
- League: Superior International Junior Hockey League
- Operated: 2001-2008
- Home arena: Port Arthur Arena
- Colours: Burgundy, Blue, and White
- General manager: Jason Stajkowski
- Head coach: Greg Batters

The Thunder Bay Bulldogs were a Junior "A" ice hockey team from the Port Arthur section of Thunder Bay, Ontario, Canada. They were a part of the Superior International Junior Hockey League.

== History ==
The Thunder Bay Bulldogs, sometimes referred to as the Port Arthur Bulldogs, were founded with the inception of the Superior International Junior Hockey League.

Both the 2001-02 and 2002-03 season were winning seasons for the Bulldogs, with the 2002-03 season having them finish in second place overall. Despite a record of 31 wins, 15 losses, 3 ties, and 3 losses in overtime, the Bulldogs were unable to displace the Fort Frances Borderland Thunders for the 2003 Bill Salonen Cup.

In 2003, their crosstown rivals, the Fort William North Stars, started picking up momentum. For two seasons, the Port Arthur squad dominated while Fort William tried to keep up. In 2003, the Bulldogs fell apart while the North Stars began a season that would leave them in 2006 as three-time defending league champions.

From 2003 until 2008, the Bulldogs never had more than 15 wins in a season.

In 2008, it was decided that the Bulldogs should fold into the Thunder Bay Bearcats franchise. Dropping from three to two Thunder Bay clubs was done in an effort to resurrect the Thunder Bay Kings Midget AAA program that had to cease in 2007.

== Season-by-season results ==
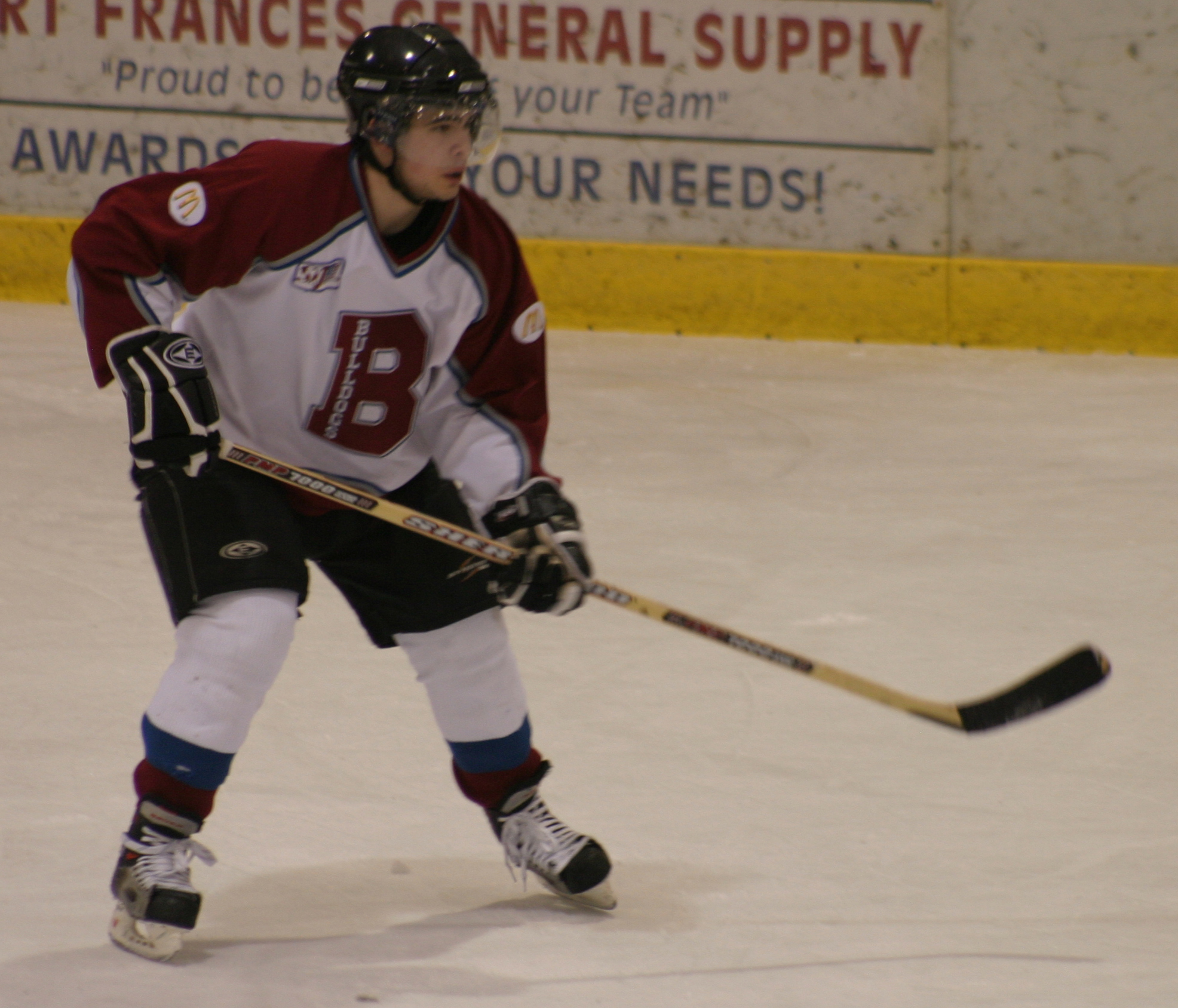
Forward Myles Stevens (2008)

Season	GP	W	L	T	OTL	GF	GA	P	Results	Playoffs
2001-02	48	24	21	3	0	216	198	51	4th SIJHL	
2002-03	52	31	15	3	3	257	207	68	2nd SIJHL	
2003-04	48	15	25	4	4	165	236	38	4th SIJHL	
2004-05	48	2	40	2	4	72	361	10	5th SIJHL	DNQ
2005-06	52	9	41	1	1	138	340	20	5th SIJHL	DNQ
2006-07	50	13	34	2	1	193	309	29	5th SIJHL	DNQ
2007-08	50	9	38	3	0	111	212	21	6th SIJHL	Lost quarter-final

=== Playoffs ===
- 2002 Lost semi-final

Fort Frances Borderland Thunder defeated Thunder Bay Bulldogs 4-games-to-3

- 2003 Lost final, lost Dudley Hewitt Cup round robin

Thunder Bay Bulldogs defeated Fort William Wolves 4-games-to-1
Fort Frances Borderland Thunder defeated Thunder Bay Bulldogs 4-games-to-1
Fourth and eliminated from Dudley Hewitt Cup round robin

- 2004 Lost semi-final

Fort William North Stars defeated Thunder Bay Bulldogs 4-games-to-none

- 2005 DNQ
- 2006 DNQ
- 2007 DNQ
- 2008 Lost quarter-final

Thunder Bay Bearcats defeated Thunder Bay Bulldogs 3-games-to-none
