= Schreiber Diesels =

- City: Schreiber, Ontario
- League: Superior International Junior Hockey League
- Operated: 2005-2009
- Home arena: Schreiber Recreation Complex
- Colours: Black, Yellow, and White
- General manager: Bill MacLaurin
- Head coach: Bobby Spadoni

The Schreiber Diesels were a Junior "A" ice hockey team from Schreiber, Ontario, Canada. They were a part of the Superior International Junior Hockey League.

== History ==
The Schreiber Diesels were coached by Bobby Spadoni, a life long resident of the area. The Diesels were formed in September 2005 and quickly became a competitive team within the league.

The Diesels won the SIJHL championship against the three-time-defending Fort William North Stars in 2007 after forcing the series into a seventh game. The Diesels took home the Bill Salonen Cup for winning the league, and had earned a spot in the 2007 Dudley Hewitt Cup Tournament in Iroquois Falls, Ontario.

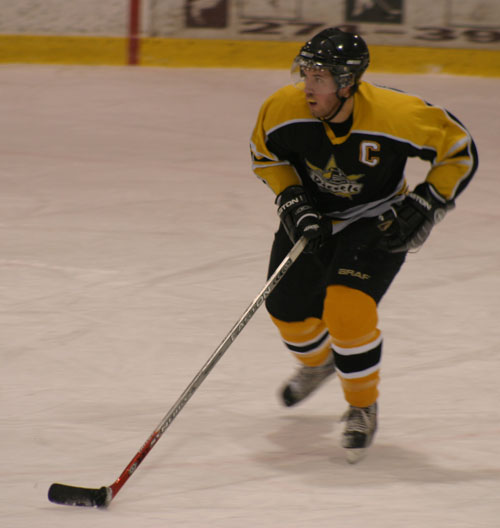
Diesels captain Reilly Miller (2007)

The Diesels did well at the Dudley Hewitt Cup, and even made to the finals. The Diesels were crushed 10-0 by the eventual 2007 Royal Bank Cup champions, the Aurora Tigers at the Central Canadian Championship.

=== 2007-08 season ===
On December 17, 2007, the SIJHL announced the cessation of the Schreiber Diesel's season. The team cited lack of crowd support this season, but claimed there were other factors. The Diesels were in their third season of operation and were the defending league champions. Soon after, on December 21, it was revealed that the Diesels had been bought by a group of local fans in an effort to keep hockey in Schreiber alive.

A year later, in the summer of 2009, the Diesels folded. Their final outing as a team was as hosts for the 2009 Dudley Hewitt Cup.

== Season-by-Season results ==
Season	GP	W	L	T	OTL	GF	GA	P	Results	Playoffs
2005-06	52	20	27	3	2	231	300	45	3rd SIJHL	Lost semi-final
2006-07	50	33	11	2	4	351	204	73	2nd SIJHL	Won League
2007-08	50	25	22	3	0	184	181	53	4th SIJHL	Lost semi-final
2008-09	50	26	21	-	3	213	220	55	4th SIJHL	Lost semi-final

=== Playoffs ===
- 2006 Lost semi-final

Dryden Ice Dogs defeated Schreiber Diesels 4-games-to-none

- 2007 Won League, lost Dudley Hewitt Cup final

Schreiber Diesels defeated Thunder Bay Bearcats 4-games-to-2
Schreiber Diesels defeated Fort William North Stars 4-games-to-3 SIJHL CHAMPIONS
Second in Dudley Hewitt Cup round robin (1-2)
Schreiber Diesels defeated Abitibi Eskimos (NOJHL) 6-5 2OT in semi-final
Aurora Tigers (OPJHL) defeated Schreiber Diesels 10-0 in final

- 2008 Lost semi-final

Schreiber Diesels defeated Fort Frances Jr. Sabres 3-games-to-none
Dryden Ice Dogs defeated Schreiber Diesels 4-games-to-3

- 2009 Lost semi-final, Hosted and Lost Dudley Hewitt Cup semi-final

Schreiber Diesels defeated Dryden Ice Dogs 3-games-to-none
Fort William North Stars defeated Schreiber Diesels 4-games-to-3
Third in Dudley Hewitt Cup round robin (2-1)
Fort William North Stars defeated Schreiber Diesels 4-3 in semi-final
