= Thunder Bay Bearcats =

- City: Thunder Bay, Ontario
- League: Superior International Junior Hockey League
- Operated: 2001-2009
- Home arena: Fort William First Nations Arena
- Colours: Burgundy, Yellow, and White
- General manager: Ian Swalucynski
- Head coach: Vern Ray

Franchise history
- 2001-2002: First Nations Featherman Hawks
- 2002-2003: Nipigon Featherman Hawks
- 2003-2006: K&A First Nations Golden Hawks
- 2006-2009: Thunder Bay Bearcats

The Thunder Bay Bearcats were a Junior "A" ice hockey team from Thunder Bay, Ontario, Canada. They were a part of the Superior International Junior Hockey League.

== History ==
The team was founded in 2001 with the Superior International Junior Hockey League as the K&A First Nations Featherman Hawks. After one season they moved to Nipigon and became Nipigon Featherman Hawks. The next season they moved back to Thunder Bay and became the K&A First Nations Golden Hawks.

In 2006, the team was bought and renamed the Thunder Bay Bearcats. The Bearcats moniker was a prominent team name in the region in the 1950s.

In 2008, the Bearcats absorbed the Thunder Bay Bulldogs to resurrect and improve the city's Thunder Bay Kings Midget AAA program.

In May 2009, the Bearcats did not attend the league's AGM and it soon came out that the team was disbanding.

== Season-by-Season results ==
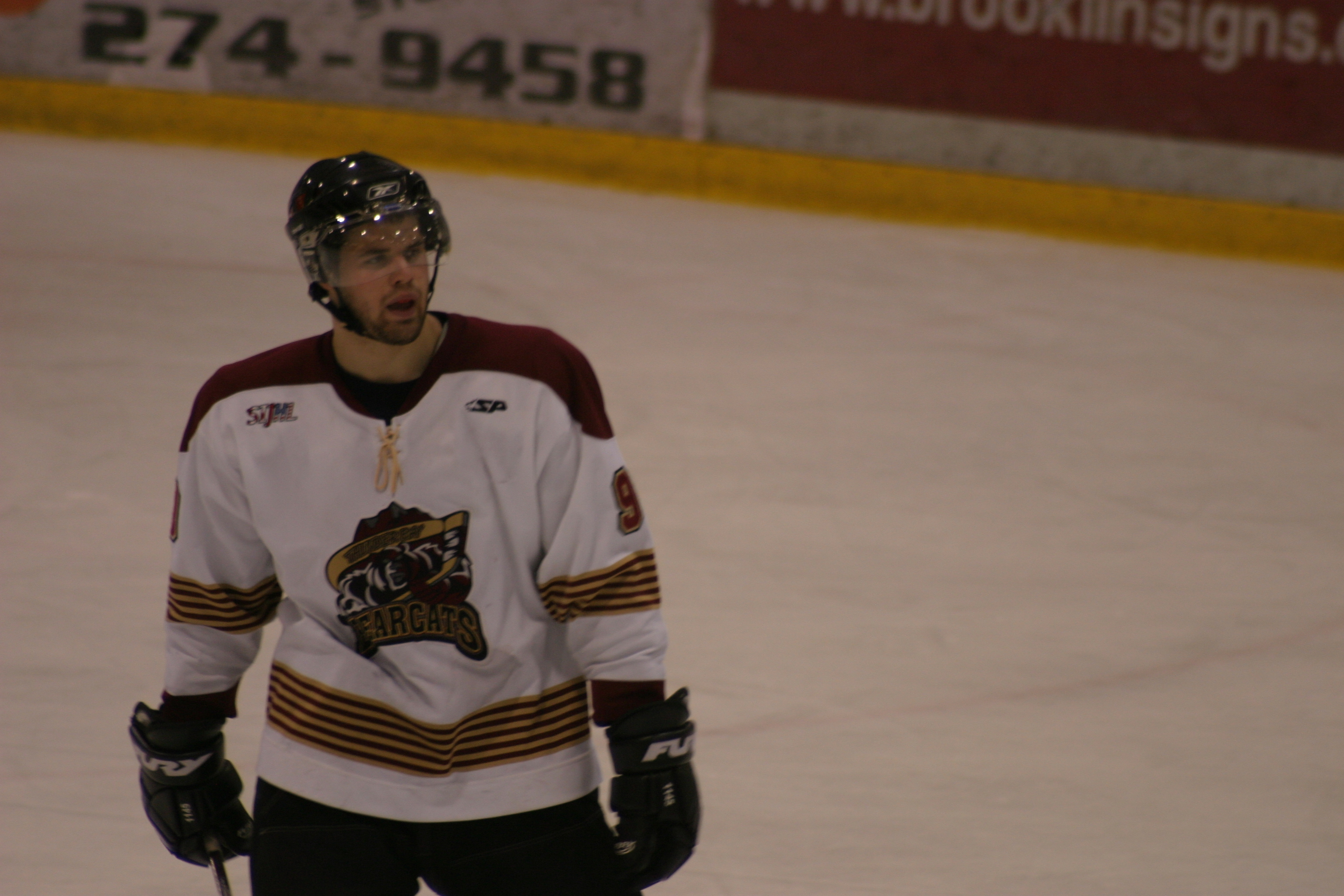
Mitch Marostica heads off ice (2008)

K&A First Nations Golden Hawks

Season	GP	W	L	T	OTL	GF	GA	P	Results	Playoffs
2001-02	48	29	15	4	0	219	157	62	2nd SIJHL	
2002-03	52	11	36	1	4	173	312	27	5th SIJHL	
2003-04	48	4	39	4	1	129	282	13	5th SIJHL	
2004-05	48	15	27	5	1	142	202	36	4th SIJHL	Lost semi-final
2005-06	52	14	34	2	2	202	270	32	4th SIJHL	Lost semi-final
2006-07	50	29	17	1	3	250	201	62	3rd SIJHL	Lost semi-final
2007-08	50	33	16	1	0	213	147	67	3rd SIJHL	Lost semi-final
2008-09	50	33	11	-	6	221	142	72	2nd SIJHL	Lost final

=== Playoffs ===
- 2002 Lost semi-final

Dryden Ice Dogs defeated Nipigon Featherman Hawks 4-games-to-none

- 2003 DNQ
- 2004 DNQ
- 2005 Lost semi-final

Fort William North Stars defeated K&A Golden Hawks 4-games-to-none

- 2006 Lost semi-final

Fort William North Stars defeated K&A Golden Hawks 4-games-to-none

- 2007 Lost semi-final

Schreiber Diesels defeated Thunder Bay Bearcats 4-games-to-2

- 2008 Lost semi-final

Thunder Bay Bearcats defeated Thunder Bay Bulldogs 3-games-to-none
Fort William North Stars defeated Thunder Bay Bearcats 4-games-to-1

- 2009 Lost final

Thunder Bay Bearcats defeated Fort Frances Jr. Sabres 4-games-to-1
Fort William North Stars defeated Thunder Bay Bearcats 4-games-to-1
