= 2015–16 MHL season =

2015–16 MHL Season
- League: Maritime Junior Hockey League
- Sport: Hockey
- Duration: September 10, 2015 – April 25, 2016
- Teams: 12
- TV partner: FastHockey
- Finals champions: Pictou County Crushers

MHL seasons
- 2014–15 2016–17

The 2015–16 Maritime Junior Hockey League season was the 49th season in league history. Each team played 48 games.

At the end of the regular season, the league's top teams competed for the Kent Cup, the league's playoff championship trophy. The team successful in winning the Kent Cup had a chance to compete for the 2016 Fred Page Cup to determine the Eastern Canadian Champion, if successful in winning the team moved on to compete for the 2016 Royal Bank Cup to determine the 2016 Junior 'A' champion.

== Team changes ==
No team changes.

== Regular season standings ==
Note: GP = Games played; W = Wins; L = Losses; OTL = Overtime losses; SL = Shootout losses; GF = Goals for; GA = Goals against; PTS = Points; STK = Streak; x = Clinched playoff spot y = Clinched division; z = Clinched first overall

Final Standings

Eastlink South Division	GP	W	L	OTL	SL	GF	GA	Pts.	Stk
xy - Truro Bearcats	48	25	15	5	3	134	116	58	L1
x - Valley Wildcats	48	26	17	2	3	179	165	57	W1
x - Pictou County Crushers	48	25	18	5	0	172	143	55	L1
x - South Shore Lumberjacks	48	24	21	2	1	138	142	51	W1
Amherst Ramblers	48	17	29	1	1	142	187	36	W2
Yarmouth Mariners	48	13	35	0	0	141	222	26	L1

Eastlink North Division	GP	W	L	OTL	SL	GF	GA	Pts.	Stk
xyz - Summerside Western Capitals	48	34	12	1	1	207	150	70	W8
x - Woodstock Slammers	48	32	10	5	1	197	124	70	W1
x - Dieppe Commandos	48	33	14	1	0	207	160	67	W2
x - Campbellton Tigers	48	23	16	7	2	152	143	55	L2
Miramichi Timberwolves	48	26	20	0	2	178	177	54	L1
County Aces	48	10	36	2	0	124	242	22	L2

== 2016 MHL Playoff bracket ==
Quarter-finals
1	Truro Bearcats	3
4	South Shore Lumberjacks	4
South Division
2	Valley Wildcats	2
3	Pictou County Crushers	4
1	Summerside Western Capitals	4
4	Campbellton Tigers	3
North Division
2	Woodstock Slammers	3
3	Dieppe Commandos	4

Semi-finals
4	South Shore Lumberjacks	1
3	Pictou County Crushers	4
1	Summerside Western Capitals	2
3	Dieppe Commandos	4

Kent Cup Finals
3	Pictou County Crushers	4
3	Dieppe Commandos	2

== Quarter-finals ==
- *= If Necessary

=== South Division Semi-final 1 (1) Truro Beatcats vs. (4) South Shore Lumberjacks ===
Sat Mar 19	Truro Bearcats	5-2	South Shore Lumberjacks	Rath Eastlink Community Centre
Eli Jarvis (1) - 8:58; Josh Worthen (1) - 9:28; Connor Morrison (1) - pp - 13:28		First period	No Scoring
Jimmy Soper (1) - pp - 19:59		Second period	No scoring
Braydon Blight (1) - 11:07		Third period	6:50 - Max Robitaille (1); 10:04 - Josh Shatford (1)
Jacob Fancy (1-0-0) 31 saves/33 shots		Goalie stats	Adrian Clark (0-1-0) 7 saves/10 shots Bailey Stephens (0-0-0) 24 saves/24 shots

Sun Mar 20	South Shore Lumberjacks	2-3	2OT	Truro Bearcats	Lunenburg County Lifestyle Centre

Tue Mar 22	Truro Bearcats	1-4	South Shore Lumberjacks	Rath Eastlink Community Centre

Thu Mar 24	South Shore Lumberjacks	4-1	Truro Bearcats	Lunenburg County Lifestyle Centre

Sat Mar 26	Truro Bearcats	2-1	South Shore Lumberjacks	Rath Eastlink Community Centre

Mon Mar 28	South Shore Lumberjacks	2-1	Truro Bearcats	Lunenburg County Lifestyle Centre

Wed Mar 30	Truro Bearcats	2-5	South Shore Lumberjacks	Rath Eastlink Community Centre

South Shore wins series 4-3

=== South Division Semi-final 2 (2) Valley Wildcats vs. (3) Pictou County Crushers ===
Fri Mar 18	Valley Wildcats	1-2	Pictou County Crushers	Kings Mutual Century Centre
No scoring		First period	10:12 - pp - Regan Spears (1); 16:44 - Mark Kennedy (1)
Matthew Nosella (1) - 8:41		Second period	No scoring
No scoring		Third period	No scoring
Daniel Vautour (1-0-0) 27 saves/28 shots		Goalie stats	Ryan Huestis (0-1-0) 29 saves/31 shots

Sun Mar 20	Pictou County Crushers	3-2	Valley Wildcats	Pictou County Wellness Centre

Tue Mar 22	Valley Wildcats	1-4	Pictou County Crushers	Kings Mutual Century Centre

Thu Mar 24	Pictou County Crushers	2-6	Valley Wildcats	Pictou County Wellness Centre

Sat Mar 26	Valley Wildcats	4-1	Pictou County Crushers	Kings Mutual Century Centre

Mon Mar 28	Pictou County Crushers	5-1	Valley Wildcats	Pictou County Wellness Centre

Pictou County wins series 4-2

=== North Division Semi-final 1 (1) Summerside Western Capitals vs. (4) Campbellton Tigers ===
Thu Mar 17	Summerside Western Capitals	5-6	Campbellton Tigers	Consolidated Credit Union Place
No scoring		First period	3:40 - Malik Johnson (1); 3:58 - Eddie Blainville (1); 15:10 - William Basque (1)
Alex Peddle (1) - pp - 1:11; Evan Morrison (1) - 1:22; Sam LeBlanc (1) - 14:08		Second period	13:16 - Eddie Blainville (2); 15:42 - Pierre-Luc Lurette (1); 15:59 - Malik Johnson (2)
Sam LeBlanc (2) - pp - 0:28; Evan Morrison (2) - 18:33		Third period	No scoring
Matt Williams (0-0-0) 18 saves/21 shots Kyle Michalovsky (0-1-0) 8 saves/11 shots		Goalie stats	Rowan O'Brien (1-0-0) 32 saves/37 shots

Sat Mar 19	Campbellton Tigers	5-4	2OT	Summerside Western Capitals	Memorial Civic Center

Sun Mar 20	Summerside Western Capitals	4-2	Campbellton Tigers	Consolidated Credit Union Place

Tue Mar 22	Campbellton Tigers	7-3	Summerside Western Capitals	Memorial Civic Center

Thu Mar 24	Summerside Western Capitals	6-4	Campbellton Tigers	Consolidated Credit Union Place

Sat Mar 26	Campbellton Tigers	1-3	Summerside Western Capitals	Memorial Civic Center

Tue Mar 29	Summerside Western Capitals	4-1	Campbellton Tigers	Consolidated Credit Union Place

Summerside wins series 4-3

=== North Division Semi-final 2 (2) Woodstock Slammers vs. (3) Dieppe Commandos ===
Thu Mar 17	Woodstock Slammers	5-2	Dieppe Commandos	Carleton Civic Centre
No scoring		First period	10:41 - Alex Lavoie (1)
Riley Craft (1) - 1:40; Konner Haas (1) - 11:06		Second period	No scoring
Konner Haas (2) - 12:43; Jonny Erbs (1) - 14:55; Jarred Toole (1) - en - 18:32		Third period	13:40 - Cody Drover (1)
Zachary Fortin (1-0-0) 34 saves/36 shots		Goalie stats	Maxime Michaud (0-1-0) 18 saves/22 shots

Sat Mar 19	Dieppe Commandos	4-2	Woodstock Slammers	Arthur-J-LeBlanc Arena

Mon Mar 21	Woodstock Slammers	3-4	Dieppe Commandos	Carleton Civic Centre

Thu Mar 24	Dieppe Commandos	3-4	2OT	Woodstock Slammers	Arthur-J-LeBlanc Arena

Sat Mar 26	Woodstock Slammers	5-3	Dieppe Commandos	Carleton Civic Centre

Mon Mar 28	Dieppe Commandos	4-2	Woodstock Slammers	Arthur-J-LeBlanc Arena

Wed Mar 30	Woodstock Slammers	0-1	Dieppe Commandos	Carleton Civic Centre

Dieppe wins series 4-3

== Semi-finals ==
=== South Division Finals (3) Pictou County Crushers vs (4) Shouth Shore Lumberjacks ===
Fri Apr 1	Pictou County Crushers	4-1	South Shore Lumberjacks	Pictou County Wellness Centre

Sun Apr 3	South Shore Lumberjacks	4-1	Pictou County Crushers	Lunenburg County Lifestyle Centre

Tue Apr 5	Pictou County Crushers	3-0	South Shore Lumberjacks	Pictou County Wellness Centre

Thu Apr 7	South Shore Lumberjacks	3-6	Pictou County Crushers	Lunenburg County Lifestyle Centre

Sun Apr 10	Pictou County Crushers	9-0	South Shore Lumberjacks	Pictou County Wellness Centre

Pictou County wins series 4-1

=== North Division Finals (1) Summerside Western Capitals vs (3) Dieppe Commandos ===
Sat Apr 2	Summerside Western Capitals	3-2	Dieppe Commandos	Consolidated Credit Union Place

Mon Apr 4	Dieppe Commandos	4-2	Summerside Western Capitals	Arthur-J-LeBlanc Arena

Wed Apr 6	Summerside Western Capitals	4-5	OT	Dieppe Commandos	Consolidated Credit Union Place

Sat Apr 9	Dieppe Commandos	5-1	Summerside Western Capitals	Arthur-J-LeBlanc Arena

Sun Apr 10	Summerside Western Capitals	4-3	Dieppe Commandos	Consolidated Credit Union Place

Tue Apr 12	Dieppe Commandos	3-2	2OT	Summerside Western Capitals	Arthur-J-LeBlanc Arena

Dieppe wins series 4-2

== Kent Cup Finals ==
=== Kent Cup Finals (3) Dieppe Commandos vs (3) Pictou County Crushers ===
Fri Apr 15	Dieppe Commandos	4-1	Pictou County Crushers	Arthur-J-LeBlanc Arena

Sun Apr 17	Pictou County Crushers	4-1	Dieppe Commandos	Pictou County Wellness Centre

Wed Apr 20	Dieppe Commandos	0-7	Pictou County Crushers	Arthur-J-LeBlanc Arena

Thu Apr 21	Pictou County Crushers	1-3	Dieppe Commandos	Pictou County Wellness Centre

Sat Apr 23	Dieppe Commandos	3-4	Pictou County Crushers	Arthur-J-LeBlanc Arena

Mon Apr 25	Pictou County Crushers	4-3	2OT	Dieppe Commandos	Pictou County Wellness Centre

Pictou County wins series 4-2
