= 2012–13 MHL season =

2012–13 MHL Season
- League: Maritime Junior Hockey League
- Sport: Hockey
- Duration: Regular season September 13, 2012 – March 8, 2013; Playoffs; March 11, 2013 – April 24, 2013
- Teams: 11
- TV partner: FastHockey
- Finals champions: Summerside Western Capitals

MHL seasons
- 2013–14

The 2012–13 Maritime Junior Hockey League season was the 46th season in league history. The season consisted of 52 games played by each MHL team.

Upon completion of the regular season, the top qualifying teams will play down for the Kent Cup, the league's playoff championship trophy. The Kent Cup champion will then meet the top teams of the Quebec Junior AAA Hockey League and Central Canada Hockey League in a host city to determine the Eastern Canadian Fred Page Cup champion.

The Summerside Western Capitals won the 2013 Kent Cup by losing only 1 game throughout the entire MHL playoffs.

The Fred Page Cup was hosted and won by the Truro Bearcats in 2013 with the Summerside Western Capitals the runners-up. The 2013 RBC cup Was hosted by the Summerside Western Capitals they finished 2nd while Truro finished 5th.

== Team Changes ==
The Metro Marauders were renamed the Metro Shipbuilders.

== Regular season standings ==
Final standings

Note: GP = Games played; W = Wins; L = Losses; OTL = Overtime losses; SL = Shootout losses; GF = Goals for; GA = Goals against; PTS = Points; X - Clinched Playoff spot; Y - Clinched Division; Z- Clinched first overall

| Eastlink Division | GP | W | L | OTL | SL | GF | GA | Pts. |
| y-Truro Bearcats | 52 | 38 | 9 | 0 | 5 | 226 | 124 | 81 |
| x-Yarmouth Jr. A Mariners | 52 | 37 | 10 | 2 | 3 | 215 | 139 | 79 |
| x-Amherst Ramblers | 52 | 32 | 14 | 4 | 2 | 216 | 153 | 70 |
| x-Pictou County Weeks Crushers | 52 | 28 | 19 | 4 | 1 | 299 | 185 | 61 |
| x-Bridgewater Lumberjacks | 52 | 10 | 39 | 0 | 3 | 144 | 255 | 23 |
| Metro Shipbuilders | 52 | 4 | 46 | 1 | 1 | 124 | 287 | 10 |

| Roger Meek Division | GP | W | L | OTL | SL | GF | GA | Pts. |
| z-Summerside Western Capitals | 52 | 43 | 7 | 2 | 0 | 222 | 119 | 88 |
| x-Woodstock Slammers | 52 | 29 | 17 | 2 | 4 | 207 | 181 | 64 |
| x-Dieppe Commandos | 52 | 27 | 20 | 1 | 4 | 212 | 201 | 59 |
| x-Miramichi Timberwolves | 52 | 26 | 24 | 0 | 3 | 180 | 214 | 54 |
| Campbellton Tigers | 52 | 12 | 36 | 1 | 3 | 137 | 224 | 28 |

== 2013 MHL Playoff bracket ==
| Eastlink Division Best 2 of 3 Mini Series Winner Plays Truro |
| 4 | Pictou County Crushers | 2 |
| 5 | Bridgewater Lumberjacks | 0 |

Quarter-finals
1 | Truro Bearcats | 4
4 | Pictou County Crushers | 3
Eastlink Division
2 | Yarmouth Mariners | 2
3 | Amherst Ramblers | 4
1 | Summerside Western Capitals | 4
4 | Miramichi Timberwolves | 0
Roger Meek Division
2 | Woodstock Slammers | 4
3 | Dieppe Commandos | 1

Semi-finals
1 | Truro Bearcats | 4
3 | Amherst Ramblers | 2
1 | Summerside Western Capitals | 4
2 | Woodstock Slammers | 0

Kent Cup Finals
2 | Truro Bearcats | 1
1 | Summerside Western Capitals | 4

=== Eastlink Division Mini series ===
- * = If Necessary

=== (4) Pictou County Crushers Vs. (5) Bridgewater Lumberjacks ===
| March 11 | Bridgewater Lumberjacks | 3 - 5 | Pictou County Crushers | Bridgewater Memorial Arena |

| March 13 | Pictou County Crushers | 7 - 1 | Bridgewater Lumberjacks | Pictou County Wellness Centre |

| Pictou County wins series 2 - 0 |

== Round one ==
=== (1) Meek Semi-final 1 Summerside Western Capitals Vs. (4) Miramichi Timberwolves ===
| March 17 | Summerside Western Capitals | 4 - 2 | Miramichi Timberwolves | Consolidated Credit Union Place |

| March 19 | Miramichi Timberwolves | 1 - 2 | Summerside Western Capitals | Miramichi Civic Centre |

| March 21 | Summerside Western Capitals | 8 - 2 | Miramichi Timberwolves | Consolidated Credit Union Place |

| March 23 | Miramichi Timberwolves | 3 - 5 | Summerside Western Capitals | Miramichi Civic Centre |

| Summerside Wins Series 4 - 0 |

=== Meek Semi-final 2 (2) Woodstock Slammers vs. (3) Dieppe Commandos ===
| March 16 | Woodstock Slammers | 6 - 0 | Dieppe Commandos | Carleton Civic Center |

| March 20 | Dieppe Commandos | 3 - 6 | Woodstock Slammers | Arthur-J-LeBlanc Centre |

| March 22 | Woodstock Slammers | 6 - 2 | Dieppe Commandos | Carleton Civic Center |

| March 24 | Dieppe Commandos | 2 - 1 | 2OT | Woodstock Slammers | Arthur-J-LeBlanc Centre |

| March 26 | Woodstock Slammers | 5 - 4 | OT | Dieppe Commandos | Carleton Civic Center |

| Woodstock wins series 4 – 1 |

=== Eastlink Semi-finals 1 (1)Truro Bearcats vs. (4) Pictou County Crushers ===
| March 16 | Truro Bearcats | 1 - 3 | Pictou County Crushers | Rath Eastlink Community Centre |

| March 19 | Pictou County Crushers | 4 - 3 | Truro Bearcats | Pictou County Wellness Centre |

| March 21 | Truro Bearcats | 6 - 3 | Pictou County Crushers | Rath Eastlink Community Centre |

| March 23 | Pictou County Crushers | 3 - 5 | Truro Bearcats | Pictou County Wellness Centre |

| March 26 | Truro Bearcats | 2 - 1 | 2OT | Pictou County Crushers | Rath Eastlink Community Centre |

| March 28 | Pictou County Crushers | 4 - 2 | Truro Bearcats | Pictou County Wellness Centre |

| March 30 | Truro Bearcats | 3 - 1 | Pictou County Crushers | Rath Eastlink Community Centre |

| Truro wins series 4 – 3 |

=== Eastlink Semi-finals 2 (2) Yarmouth Mariners vs. (3) Amherst Ramblers ===
| March 17 | Yarmouth Mariners | 4 - 5 | Amherst Ramblers | Mariners Centre |

| March 19 | Amherst Ramblers | 3 - 2 | Yarmouth Mariners | Amherst Stadium |

| March 21 | Yarmouth Mariners | 4 - 2 | Amherst Ramblers | Mariners Centre |

| March 23 | Amherst Ramblers | 2 - 4 | Yarmouth Mariners | Amherst Stadium |

| March 26 | Yarmouth Mariners | 3 - 4 | 2OT | Amherst Ramblers | Mariners Centre |

| March 28 | Amherst Ramblers | 2 - 0 | Yarmouth Mariners | Amherst Stadium |

| Amherst wins series 4 – 2 |

== Round two ==
=== Meek Final(1) Summerside Western Capitals Vs. (2) Woodstock Slammers ===
| March 31 | Summerside Western Capitals | 5 - 1 | Woodstock Slammers | Consolidated Credit Union Place |

| April 2 | Woodstock Slammers | 2 - 5 | Summerside Western Capitals | Carleton Civic Center |

| April 5 | Summerside Western Capitals | 6 - 2 | Woodstock Slammers | Consolidated Credit Union Place |

| April 7 | Woodstock Slammers | 1 - 5 | Summerside Western Capitals | Carleton Civic Center |

| Summerside wins series 4 - 0 |

=== Eastlink Final (1) Truro Bearcats vs. (3) Amherst Ramblers ===
| April 2 | Truro Bearcats | 2 - 3 | Amherst Ramblers | Rath Eastlink Community Centre |

| April 5 | Amherst Ramblers | 3 - 5 | Truro Bearcats | Amherst Stadium |

| April 7 | Truro Bearcats | 7 - 2 | Amherst Ramblers | Rath Eastlink Community Centre |

| April 9 | Amherst Ramblers | 4 - 3 | Truro Bearcats | Amherst Stadium |

| April 10 | Truro Bearcats | 3 - 2 | Amherst Ramblers | Rath Eastlink Community Centre |

| April 13 | Amherst Ramblers | 2 - 4 | Truro Bearcats | Amherst Stadium |

| Truro Wins series 4 - 2 |

== Kent Cup Finals ==
=== Kent Cup final (1) Summerside Western Capitals vs. (2) Truro Bearcats ===
| April 16 | Summerside Western Capitals | 4 - 3 | Truro Bearcats | Consolidated Credit Union Place |

| April 19 | Truro Bearcats | 4 - 3 | 2OT | Summerside Western Capitals | Rath Eastlink Community Centre |

| April 21 | Summerside Western Capitals | 3 - 2 | Truro Bearcats | Consolidated Credit Union Place |

| April 22 | Truro Bearcats | 2 - 3 | 2OT | Summerside Western Capitals | Rath Eastlink Community Centre |

| April 24 | Summerside Western Capitals | 3 - 0 | Truro Bearcats | Consolidated Credit Union Place |

| Summerside wins series 4 - 1 |
