= 2016–17 MHL season =

2016–17 MHL Season
- League: Maritime Junior Hockey League
- Sport: Hockey
- Duration: September 8, 2016 – April 28, 2017
- Teams: 12
- TV partner: FastHockey
- Finals champions: Truro Bearcats

MHL seasons
- 2015–16 2017–18

The 2016–17 Maritime Junior Hockey League season was the 50th season in league history. The season consisted of 50 games played by each MHL team.

At the end of the regular season, the league's top teams competed for the Kent Cup, the league's playoff championship trophy. The team successful in winning the Kent Cup went on to compete for the 2017 Fred Page Cup to determine the Eastern Canadian Champion, who would then move on to compete for the 2017 Royal Bank Cup to determine the 2017 Junior 'A' champion.

== Team changes ==
No team changes.

== Regular-season Standings ==
Note: GP = Games played; W = Wins; L = Losses; OTL = Overtime losses; SL = Shootout losses; GF = Goals for; GA = Goals against; PTS = Points; STK = Streak; x = Clinched playoff spot y = Clinched division; z = Clinched first overall

Eastlink South Division	GP	W	L	OTL	SL	GF	GA	Pts.	Stk
Z-Pictou County Crushers	50	38	9	2	1	265	145	79	W2
X-Truro Bearcats	50	35	13	1	1	196	154	72	L1
X-Yarmouth Jr. A Mariners	50	32	12	2	4	184	145	70	W2
X-Amherst Ramblers	50	31	14	3	2	201	174	67	W2
South Shore Lumberjacks	50	17	30	2	1	171	232	37	L5
Valley Wildcats	50	12	31	4	3	140	245	31	L4

Eastlink North Division	GP	W	L	OTL	SL	GF	GA	Pts.	Stk
Y-Miramichi Timberwolves	50	35	12	2	1	227	161	73	W3
X-Dieppe Commandos	50	27	16	4	3	187	159	61	L2
X-Summerside Western Capitals	50	25	22	0	3	169	184	53	W2
X-St. Stephen Aces	50	16	25	6	3	183	216	41	W2
Woodstock Slammers	50	18	29	1	2	131	178	39	L9
Campbellton Tigers	50	14	33	1	2	134	195	31	W2

== 2017 MHL Playoff bracket ==
Quarter-finals
1	Pictou County	3
4	Amherst	4
South Division
2	Truro	4
3	Yarmouth	1
1	Miramichi	4
4	St. Stephen	0
North Division
2	Dieppe	2
3	Summerside	4

Semi-finals
2	Truro	4
4	Amherst	1
1	Miramichi	4
3	Summerside	0

Kent Cup Finals
2	Miramichi	3
3	Truro	4

== Division Semi-final ==
- *= If Necessary

=== South Division Semi-final 1 (1) Pictou County Crushers vs. (4) Amherst Ramblers ===
- Game 5 between Pictou County and Amherst was played at the Keating Millennium Centre in Antigonish on the campus of STFX

Thu Mar 16	Pictou County Crushers	5-4	2OT	Amherst Ramblers	Pictou County Wellness Centre

Sat Mar 18	Amherst Ramblers	4-1	Pictou County Crushers	Amherst Stadium

Mon Mar 20	Pictou County Crushers	3-4	Amherst Ramblers	Pictou County Wellness Centre

Wed Mar 22	Amherst Ramblers	3-5	Pictou County Crushers	Amherst Stadium

Fri Mar 24	Pictou County Crushers	3-5	Amherst Ramblers	Pictou County Wellness Centre

Sat Mar 25	Amherst Ramblers	2-3	OT	Pictou County Crushers	Amherst Stadium

Tue Mar 28	Pictou County Crushers	5-6	OT	Amherst Ramblers	Pictou County Wellness Centre

Amherst wins series 4-3

=== South Division Semi-final 2 (2) Truro Bearcats vs. (3) Yarmouth Mariners ===
Thu Mar 16	Truro Bearcats	5-2	Yarmouth Mariners	Rath Eastlink Community Centre

Sat Mar 18	Yarmouth Mariners	1-2	Truro Bearcats	Mariners Centre

Mon Mar 20	Truro Bearcats	5-6	Yarmouth Mariners	Rath Eastlink Community Centre

Wed Mar 22	Yarmouth Mariners	1-2	Truro Bearcats	Mariners Centre

Sat Mar 25	Truro Bearcats	5-3	Yarmouth Mariners	Rath Eastlink Community Centre

Truro wins series 4-1

=== North Division Semi-final 1 (1) Miramichi Timberwolves vs. (4) St Stephen Aces ===
Sat Mar 18	Miramichi Timberwolves	10-1	St Stephen Aces	Miramichi Civic Centre

Mon Mar 20	St Stephen Aces	3-7	Miramichi Timberwolves	Garcelon Civic Centre

Thu Mar 23	Miramichi Timberwolves	4-0	St Stephen Aces	Miramichi Civic Centre

Fri Mar 24	St Stephen Aces	3-4	Miramichi Timberwolves	Garcelon Civic Centre

Miramichi wins series 4-0

=== North Division Semi-final 2 (2) Dieppe Commandos vs. (3) Summerside Western Capitals ===
Wed Mar 15	Dieppe Commandos	2-3	2OT	Summerside Western Capitals	Arthur-J-LeBlanc Arena

Thu Mar 16	Summerside Western Capitals	1-2	Dieppe Commandos	Credit Union Place

Sun Mar 19	Dieppe Commandos	2-5	Summerside Western Capitals	Arthur-J-LeBlanc Arena

Tue Mar 21	Summerside Western Capitals	3-5	Dieppe Commandos	Credit Union Place

Thu Mar 23	Dieppe Commandos	1-2	OT	Summerside Western Capitals	Arthur-J-LeBlanc Arena

Sat Mar 25	Summerside Western Capitals	5-2	Dieppe Commandos	Credit Union Place

Summerside wins series 4-2

== Division finals ==
=== North Division (1) Miramichi Timberwolves vs. (3) Summerside Western Capitals ===
Sat Apr 1	Miramichi Timberwolves	4-0	Summerside Western Capitals	Miramichi Civic Centre

Mon Apr 3	Summerside Western Capitals	2-5	Miramichi Timberwolves	Credit Union Place

Wed Apr 05	Miramichi Timberwolves	6-3	Summerside Western Capitals	Miramichi Civic Centre

Fri Apr 07	Summerside Western Capitals	1-5	Miramichi Timberwolves	Credit Union Place

Miramichi wins series 4-0

=== South Division Final (2) Truro Bearcats vs. (4) Amherst Ramblers ===
Sat Apr 1	Truro Bearcats	8-0	Amherst Ramblers	Rath Eastlink Community Centre

Mon Apr 3	Amherst Ramblers	1-5	Truro Bearcats	Amherst Stadium

Wed Apr 05	Truro Bearcats	0-3	Amherst Ramblers	Rath Eastlink Community Centre

Sat Apr 08	Amherst Ramblers	2-3	Truro Bearcats	Amherst Stadium

Mon Apr 10	Truro Bearcats	5-4	Amherst Ramblers	Rath Eastlink Community Centre

Truro wins the series 4-1

== Final ==
=== MHL Final (2) Miramichi Timberwolves vs. (3) Truro Bearcats ===
Sat Apr 14	Miramichi Timberwolves	6-5	Truro Bearcats	Miramichi Civic Centre

Tue Apr 18	Truro Bearcats	5-4	Miramichi Timberwolves	Rath Eastlink Community Centre

Thu Apr 20	Miramichi Timberwolves	3-1	Truro Bearcats	Miramichi Civic Centre

Sat Apr 22	Truro Bearcats	6-3	Miramichi Timberwolves	Rath Eastlink Community Centre

Mon Apr 24	Miramichi Timberwolves	5-3	Truro Bearcats	Miramichi Civic Centre

Wed Apr 26	Truro Bearcats	3-2	Miramichi Timberwolves	Rath Eastlink Community Centre

Fri Apr 28	Miramichi Timberwolves	2-4	Truro Bearcats	Miramichi Civic Centre

Truro win the series 4-3
