= 2014–15 MHL season =

2014–15 MHL Season
- League: Maritime Junior Hockey League
- Sport: Hockey
- Duration: September 11, 2014 – April 17, 2015
- Teams: 12
- TV partner: FastHockey
- Finals champions: Dieppe Commandos

MHL seasons
- 2013–14 2015–16

The 2014–15 Maritime Junior Hockey League season was the 48th season in league history. The season consisted of 48 games played by each MHL team.

At the end of the regular season, the Dieppe Commandos, Woodstock Slammers, Miramichi Timberwolves, Campbellton Tigers, Pictou County Crushers, Truro Bearcats, Valley Wildcats and Yarmouth Mariners competed for the Kent Cup, the league's playoff championship trophy. The Kent Cup was won by the Dieppe Commandos. They beat the Truro Bearcats 4 games to 0 for their first championship in 20 Years.

The Commandos met with the Longueuil Collège Français (QJHL Champions), the Carleton Place Canadians (CCHL Champions) and the Cornwall Colts (Host) in Cornwall, Ontario to determine the Eastern Canadian Fred Page Cup champion. The champion ended up being the Carleton Place Canadians as they defeated the Commandos 3-2 in the championship game to win their second straight title.

== Team changes ==
County Aces joined league and began playing this season.

The Valley Wildcats relocated from Kentville to Berwick.

The Bridgewater Lumberjacks were renamed the South Shore Lumberjacks. (Mid Season)

== Regular season standings ==
Note: GP = Games played; W = Wins; L = Losses; OTL = Overtime losses; SL = Shootout losses; GF = Goals for; GA = Goals against; PTS = Points; STK = Streak; x = Clinched playoff spot; y = Clinched division; z = Clinched first overall

Final Standings

Eastlink Division	GP	W	L	OTL	SL	GF	GA	Pts.	Stk
y - Pictou County Crushers	48	29	14	3	2	182	168	63	L4
x - Yarmouth Mariners	48	29	15	0	4	223	170	62	W3
x - Valley Wildcats	48	25	16	3	4	187	164	57	L1
x - Truro Bearcats	48	25	19	0	4	180	154	54	W4
South Shore Lumberjacks	48	16	29	3	0	144	196	35	L3
Amherst Ramblers	48	12	32	2	2	163	260	28	L1

Roger Meek Division	GP	W	L	OTL	SL	GF	GA	Pts.	Stk
z - Dieppe Commandos	48	36	10	0	2	232	134	74	W3
x - Woodstock Slammers	48	36	10	0	2	213	127	74	L2
x - Miramichi Timberwolves	48	28	18	0	2	188	160	58	W1
x - Campbellton Tigers	48	25	18	3	2	140	139	55	L1
Summerside Western Capitals	48	21	21	3	3	184	197	48	L1
County Aces	48	6	40	0	2	106	273	14	L7

== 2015 MHL Playoff bracket ==
Quarter-finals
1	Pictou County Crushers	2
4	Truro Bearcats	4
Eastlink Division
2	Yarmouth Mariners	1
3	Valley Wildcats	4
1	Dieppe Commandos	4
4	Campbellton Tigers	0
Roger Meek Division
2	Woodstock Slammers	1
3	Miramichi Timberwolves	4

Semi-finals
4	Truro Bearcats	4
3	Valley Wildcats	0
1	Dieppe Commandos	4
3	Miramichi Timberwolves	2

Kent Cup Finals
8	Truro Bearcats	0
1	Dieppe Commandos	4

== Quarter-finals ==
Notes; *= If Necessary

=== Eastlink Semi-final 1 (1) Pictou County Crushers vs. (4) Truro Bearcats ===
Thu Mar 12	Pictou County Crushers	9-1	Truro Bearcats	Pictou County Wellness Centre
Justin McDonald (1) - 1:05; Regan Spears (1) - pp - 8:36; Evan Morrison (1) - 19:21		First period	No scoring
Daniel Walsh (1) - 2:26; Ryan Caswell (1) - 10:35; Daniel Walsh (2) - 16:26		Second period	No scoring
Michael Evoy (1) - 7:50; Luc Porier (1) - 13:46; Ethan Marsh (1) - 17:07		Third period	4:26 - Daniel Perigo (1)
Joel Horodziejczyk (1-0-0) 31 saves/32 shots		Goalie stats	Jacob Fancy (0-1-0) 25 saves/34 shots

Sat Mar 14	Truro Bearcats	7-2	Pictou County Crushers	Rath Eastlink Community Centre
Serge Boisvert (1) - 2:50; Serge Boisvert (2) - 13:33		First period	2:08 - Daniel Walsh (3); 12:59 - pp - Cole Murphy (1)
Colby Lanceleve (1) - pp - 8:50; Jordan McNaughton (1) - pp - 15:14; Jordan Wentzell (1) - 18:40		Second period	No scoring
Daniel Perigo (2) - 2:44; Jimmy Soper (1) - pp - 8:44		Third period	No scoring
Jacob Fancy (1-1-0) 32 saves/34 shots		Goalie stats	Joel Horodziejczyk (1-1-0) 26 saves/32 shots Justin Ritcey (0-0-0) 6 saves/7 shots

Tue Mar 17	Pictou County Crushers	2-5	Truro Bearcats	Pictou County Wellness Centre
Ryan Caswell (2) - 0:47; Ryan Caswell (3) - 15:48		First period	13:45 - pp - Colby Lanceleve (2); 17:43 - Colby Lanceleve (3)
No scoring		Second period	No scoring
No scoring		Third period	2:45 - Serge Boisvert (3); 4:53 - Jesse McInnis (1); 18:26 - Empty Net - Jordan McNaughton (2)
Joel Horodziejczyk (1-2-0) 18 saves/22 shots		Goalie stats	Jacob Fancy (2-1-0) 37 saves/39 shots

Thu Mar 19	Truro Bearcats	7-0	Pictou County Crushers	Rath Eastlink Community Centre
Jake Primeau (1) - pp - 18:54		First period	No scoring
Jordan McNaughton (3) - 0:39; Jimmy Soper (2) - pp - 10:40; Jordan Wentzell (2) - 17:18		Second period	No scoring
Brandon Pye (1) - sh - 0:49; Jimmy Soper (3) - 2:15; Brandon Pye (2) - pp - 11:40		Third period	No scoring
Jacob Fancy (3-1-0) 21 saves/21 shots		Goalie stats	Joel Horodziejczyk (1-3-0) 25 saves/32 shots

Sat Mar 21	Pictou County Crushers	8-1	Truro Bearcats	Pictou County Wellness Centre
Cole Murphy (2) - 1:26; Daniel Walsh (4) - 8:29		First period	17:22 - Colby Lanceleve (4)
Stephen MacInnis (1) - 12:58; Mike Lyle (1) - 13:54		Second period	No scoring
Garrett Lambke (1) - 7:05; Daniel Walsh (5) - pp - 9:01; Ryan Caswell (4) - 12:30; Ethan Marsh (2) - pp - 18:39		Third period	No scoring
Joel Horodziejczyk (2-3-0) 28 saves/29 shots		Goalie stats	Jacob Fancy (3-2-0) 25 saves/32 shots Mark Grametbauer (0-0-0) 1 saves/2 shots

Mon Mar 23	Truro Bearcats	6-3	Pictou County Crushers	Rath Eastlink Community Centre
Colby Lanceleve (5) - 0:27		First period	14:51 - sh - Mike Lyle (2)
Alex Soumakis (1) - 1:43		Second period	2:48 - Luc Porier (2)
Jimmy Soper (4) - 0:22; Jesse McInnis (2) - 11:17; Brandon Pye (2) - sh - 15:08; Daniel Perigo (2) - Empty Net - 19:37		Third period	18:46 - Daniel Walsh (6)
Jacob Fancy (4-2-0) 21 saves/24 shots		Goalie stats	Joel Horodziejczyk (2-4-0) 29 saves/34 shots

Truro wins series 4-2

=== Eastlink Semi-final 2 (2) Yarmouth Mariners vs. (3) Valley Wildcats ===
Fri Mar 13	Yarmouth Mariners	3-2	3OT	Valley Wildcats	Mariners Centre
No scoring		First period		No scoring
Shawn Boudreau (1) - 7:27; Ross Martin (1) - 8:20		Second period		9:19 - Jean-Marc Evans-Renaud (1)
No scoring		Third period		16:08 - Kaden Ruest (1)
Brandon Syms (1) - 5:40		Third overtime period		No scoring
Chase Gaudet (1-0-0) 57 saves/59 shots		Goalie stats		Blade Mann-Dixon (0-0-1) 57 saves/60 shots

Sun Mar 15	Valley Wildcats	8-4	Yarmouth Mariners	Kings Mutual Century Centre
Jeremy Butterworth (1) - 2:58; Jeremy Butterworth (2) - pp - 6:37		First period	5:30 - Tyler Brown (1)
Austin Harding (1) - pp - 5:17; Matt Wright (1) - 7:05		Second period	17:51 - pp - Charles Poulin (1)
Grant Janes (1) - 3:08; Josh Worthen (1) - pp - 6:36; Josh Worthen (2) - pp - 8:48; Jeremy Butterworth (3) - 11:38		Third period	2:47 - Jordan Messenger (1); 17:55 - Ross Martin (2)
Blade Mann-Dixon (1-0-1) 27 saves/31 shots		Goalie stats	Chase Gaudet (1-1-0) 23 saves/ 31 shots Rowan O'Brien (0-0-0) 7 saves/7 shots

Tue Mar 17	Yarmouth Mariners	0-1	Valley Wildcats	Mariners Centre
No scoring		First period	No scoring
No scoring		Second period	7:03 - Myles McGurty (1)
No scoring		Third period	No scoring
Chase Gaudet (1-2-0) 45 saves/ 46 shots		Goalie stats	Blade Mann-Dixon (2-0-1) 39 saves/39 shots

Thu Mar 19	Valley Wildcats	8-3	Yarmouth Mariners	Kings Mutual Century Centre
Kaden Ruest (2) - 7:38; Josh Worthen (3) - 12:15		First period	No scoring
Mike Molloy (1) - 5:39; Jeremy Butterworth (4) - 10:01		Second period	2:38 - Connor Donaghey (1); 8:56 - Shawn Boudreau (1)
Matt Wright (2) - sh - 0:54; Nicholas Gibson (1) - pp - 6:08; Mike Molloy (2) - 7:19; Nick Bruce (1) - 9:08		Third period	16:09 - Connor Donaghey (2)
Blade Mann-Dixon (3-0-1) 45 saves/48 shots		Goalie stats	Chase Gaudet (1-3-0) 29 saves/ 36 shots Rowan O'Brien (0-0-0) 8 saves/9 shots

Sat Mar 21	Yarmouth Mariners	4-5	2OT	Valley Wildcats	Mariners Centre
Sean Fraser (1) - pp - 2:15; Cray Roberge (1) - 9:35; Connor Rogers (1) - pp - 16:53		First period		No scoring
No scoring		Second period		2:09 - Nick Bruce (1)
Cray Roberge (2) - 5:40		Third period		5:29 - Myles McGurty (2); 9:43 - Anthony Cardinal (1); 19:16 - Josh Worthen (3)
No scoring		Second overtime period		7:09 - Brady Atwater (1)
Rowan O'Brien (0-1-0) 45 saves/ 50 shots		Goalie stats		Blade Mann-Dixon (4-0-1) 38 saves/42 shots

Valley wins series 4-1

=== Roger Meek Semi-final 1 (1) Dieppe Commandos vs. (4) Campbellton Tigers ===
Thu Mar 12	Dieppe Commandos	2-1	Campbellton Tigers	Arthur-J-LeBlanc Arena
Michael Hache (1) - sh - 13:22		First period	No scoring
No scoring		Second period	17:49 - pp - Darcy Burley (1)
Ryan Langan (1) - pp - 13:21		Third period	No scoring
Marc Terriault (1-0-0) 29 saves/30 shots		Goalie stats	Will King (0-1-0) 30 saves/32 shots

Sat Mar 14	Campbellton Tigers	0-1	Dieppe Commandos	Memorial Civic Center
No scoring		First period	No scoring
No scoring		Second period	No scoring
No scoring		Third period	2:37 - Matt Bernier (1)
Will King (0-2-0) 30 saves/31 shots		Goalie stats	Marc Terriault (2-0-0) 34 saves/34 shots

Tue Mar 17	Dieppe Commandos	2-0	Campbellton Tigers	Arthur-J-LeBlanc Arena
Robbie Graham (1) - 19:02; Micheal Hache (2) - 19:25		First period	No scoring
No scoring		Second period	No scoring
No scoring		Third period	No scoring
Marc Terriault (3-0-0) 27 saves/27 shots		Goalie stats	Will King (0-3-0) 31 saves/33 shots

Thu Mar 19	Campbellton Tigers	3-4	OT	Dieppe Commandos	Memorial Civic Center
No scoring		First period		No scoring
Malik Johnson (1) - 3:47; Mathew Astle (1) - pp - 5:49		Second period		5:07 - sh - Mathieu Newcomb (1); 15:55 - Mathieu Newcomb (2)
Robert Pelletier (1) - pp - 0:23		Third period		6:54 - sh - Benji Curtis (1)
No scoring		First overtime period		1:27 - Robbie Graham (2)
Will King (0-3-1) 34 saves/38 shots		Goalie stats		Marc Terriault (4-0-0) 43 saves/46 shots

Dieppe wins series 4-0

=== Roger Meek Semi-final 2 (2) Woodstock Slammers vs. (3) Miramichi Timberwolves ===
Fri Mar 13	Woodstock Slammers	4-3	Miramichi Timberwolves	Carleton Civic Centre
Matthew Bursey (1) - 2:48		First period	16:38 - pp - Billy Gaston (1)
Kyle Haas (1) - 19:24		Second period	15:26 - Brayden Wood (1)
Augus Johnston (1) - 7:28; Konner Haas (1) - 10:51		Third period	19:31 - Tyler Brown (1)
Matt Jenkins (1-0-0) 29 saves/32 shots		Goalie stats	Brandon Whitney (0-1-0) 23 saves/27 shots

Sat Mar 14	Miramichi Timberwolves	4-1	Woodstock Slammers	Miramichi Civic Centre
Rory Court (1) - 3:21		First period	No scoring
Neil Aird (1) - 13:07		Second period	No scoring
Billy Gaston (2) - 6:06; Mitch Graham (1) - Empty Net - 18:44		Third period	18:28 - Johnny Erbs (1)
Brandon Whitney (1-1-0) 25 saves/26 shots		Goalie stats	Matt Jenkins (1-1-0) 26 saves/29 shots

Wed Mar 18	Woodstock Slammers	2-3	Miramichi Timberwolves	Carleton Civic Centre
Konner Haas (2) - pp - 2:42; Matthew Bursey (2) - 12:03		First period	5:44 - Rory Court (2)
No scoring		Second period	16:06 - Kraig Pasher (1); 17:44 - Micheal Constantine (1)
No scoring		Third period	No scoring
Matt Jenkins (1-2-0) 30 saves/33 shots		Goalie stats	Brandon Whitney (2-1-0) 44 saves/46 shots

Fri Mar 20	Miramichi Timberwolves	4-3	OT	Woodstock Slammers	Miramichi Civic Centre
No scoring		First period		2:46 - Jean-Michael LeBlanc (1); 16:49 - pp - Brandon Parsons (1)
Jordan Kennedy (1) - pp - 3:46; Matt Cusson (1) - pp - 15:06		Second period		4:01 - Liam Hynes (1)
Mitch Graham (2) - 8:24		Third period		No scoring
Neil Aird (2) - 1:07		First overtime period		No scoring
Brandon Whitney (3-1-0) 20 saves/23 shots		Goalie stats		Matt Jenkins (1-2-1) 21 saves/25 shots

Sun Mar 22	Woodstock Slammers	2-3	Miramichi Timberwolves	Carleton Civic Centre
No scoring		First period	15:29 - Brayden Wood (2)
No scoring		Second period	No scoring
Brandon Parsons (2) - pp - 11:21; Angus Johnston (2) - 17:33		Third period	5:12 - pp - Billy Gaston (3); 5:43 - pp - Lee Dower (1)
Matt Jenkins (1-3-1) 31 saves/34 shots		Goalie stats	Brandon Whitney (4-1-0) 27 saves/29 shots

Miramichi wins series 4-1

== Semi-finals ==
=== Eastlink Division Final (3) Valley Wildcats vs. (4) Truro Bearcats ===
Fri Mar 27	Valley Wildcats	4-6	Truro Bearcats	Kings Mutual Century Centre
Jeremy Butterworth (5) - 5:32		First period	13:10 - Jimmy Soper (5); 16:32 - Colby Lanceleve (6); 16:41 - Brandon Pye (3)
Brady Atwater (2) - pp - 13:59		Second period	No scoring
John Deacon (1) - 3:58; Jean-Marc Evans-Renaud (2) - 10:51		Third period	9:29 - Daniel Perigo (3); 11:47 - Jesse McInnis (3); 19:37 - pp - Empty Net - Jimmy Soper (6)
Blade Mann-Dixon (4-1-1) 27 saves/32 shots		Goalie stats	Jacob Fancy (5-2-0) 33 saves/37 shots

Sun Mar 29	Truro Bearcats	6-5	OT	Valley Wildcats	Rath Eastlink Community Centre
Jimmy Soper (7) - 9:34		First period		5:13 - Mitchell Jones (1); 9:12 - Mike Molloy (3)
Serge Boisvert (4) - 4:51; Colby Lanceleve (7) - 5:08		Second period		15:11 - Lukas Kane (1)
Brandon Pye (4) - 1:29; Alex Soumakis (2) - 11:42		Third period		11:18 - Mike Molloy (4); 14:25 - Grant Janes (2)
Alex Soumakis (3) - 0:29		First overtime period		No scoring
Jacob Fancy (6-2-0) 33 saves/38 shots		Goalie stats		Blade Mann-Dixon (4-2-1) 33 saves/39 shots

Tue Mar 31	Valley Wildcats	3-4	Truro Bearcats	Kings Mutual Century Centre
No scoring		First period	12:20 - Jordan McNaughton (4)
No scoring		Second period	3:37 - pp - Denver Lynds (1); 6:44 - Zach Beaton (1)
Jeremy Butterworth (6) - 2:05; Jeremy Butterworth (7) - 10:53; Matt Wright (3) - Penalty Shot - 14:35		Third period	4:03 - Daniel Perigo (4)
Blade Mann-Dixon (4-3-1) 17 saves/21 shots		Goalie stats	Jacob Fancy (7-2-0) 30 saves/33 shots

Thu Apr 02	Truro Bearcats	4-2	Valley Wildcats	Rath Eastlink Community Centre
Alex Soumakis (4) - pp - 16:06		First period	No scoring
Brandon Pye (5) - 14:08		Second period	9:49 - Josh Worthen (4)
Jesse McInnis (3) - 6:55; Denver Lynds (2) - pp - 9:34		Third period	0:10 - sh - Mike Molloy (5)
Jacob Fancy (8-2-0) 22 saves/24 shots		Goalie stats	Blade Mann-Dixon (4-4-1) 21 saves/25 shots

Truro wins series 4-0

=== Roger Meek Final (1) Dieppe Commandos vs. (3) Miramichi Timberwolves ===
Thu Mar 26	Dieppe Commandos	3-1	Miramichi Timberwolves	Arthur-J-LeBlanc Arena
Ryan Groom (1) - 19:01		First period	13:11 - Micheal Constantine (2)
No scoring		Second period	No scoring
Ryan Langan (2) - pp - 11:36; Andrew Meredith (1) - pp - 15:08		Third period	No scoring
Marc Terriault (5-0-0) 13 saves/14 shots		Goalie stats	Billy Clarke (4-2-0) 44 saves/47 shots

Sat Mar 28	Miramichi Timberwolves	5-1	Dieppe Commandos	Miramichi Civic Centre
Brayden Wood (3) - 3:23		First period	No scoring
Brayden Wood (4) - pp - 2:48; Brett Malone (1) - sh - 4:49; Harrison Harper (1) - 8:54		Second period	No scoring
Billy Gaston (4) - sh - Empty Net - 15:32		Third period	1:43 - Jeremy Doucet (1)
Billy Clarke (5-2-0) 24 saves/25 shots		Goalie stats	Marc Terriault (5-1-0) 25 saves/29 shots

Tue Mar 31	Dieppe Commandos	8-4	Miramichi Timberwolves	Arthur-J-LeBlanc Arena
Mathieu Newcomb (3) - pp - 4:01		First period	7:13 - pp - Billy Gaston (5)
Ryan Langan (3) - pp - 8:31; Robbie Graham (3) - 10:45; Lindon Beckwith (1) - 13:18		Second period	7:30 - Kraig Pasher (2)
Micheal Hache (3) - 1:59; Ryan Groom (2) - 3:46; Micheal Hache (4) - 4:37; Andrew Meredith (2) - 5:40		Third period	3:55 - Jordan Kennedy (2); 5:40 - Max Robitaille (1)
Marc Terriault (6-1-0) 20 saves/24 shots		Goalie stats	Billy Clarke (5-3-0) 39 saves/47 shots Tanner Sommers (0-0-0) 3 saves/3 shots

Thu Apr 02	Miramichi Timberwolves	1-3	Dieppe Commandos	Miramichi Civic Centre
No scoring		First period	7:30 - Andrew Meredith (3); 12:31 - pp - Lindon Beckwith (2)
No scoring		Second period	1:39 - Shane Dallaire (1)
Neil Aird (3) - 2:40		Third period	No scoring
Billy Clarke (5-4-0) 31 saves/34 shots		Goalie stats	Marc Terriault (7-1-0) 27 saves/28 shots

Sat Apr 04	Dieppe Commandos	5-6	OT	Miramichi Timberwolves	Arthur-J-LeBlanc Arena
Ryan Groom (3) - 10:21		First period		3:59 - Kraig Pasher (3); 11:50 - Brett Malone (2); 15:41 - pp - Billy Gaston (6)
Jeremy Doucet (2) - 5:39		Second period		12:06 - Kraig Pasher (4)
Shane Dallaire (2) - 7:01; Andrew Meredith (4) - pp - 10:20; Andrew Meredith (5) - 14:41		Third period		2:15 - Harrison Harper (2)
No scoring		First overtime period		0:22 - pp - Billy Gaston (7)
Marc Terriault (7-1-1) 27 saves/33 shots		Goalie stats		Billy Clarke (6-4-0) 38 saves/43 shots

Mon Apr 06	Miramichi Timberwolves	2-3	2OT	Dieppe Commandos	Miramichi Civic Centre
Billy Gaston (8) - pp - 11:50; Max Robitaille (2) - 12:29		First period		14:32 - Brennan Bailey (1)
No scoring		Second period		6:03 - pp - Jeremy Doucet (3)
No scoring		Third period		No scoring
No scoring		Second overtime period		8:56 - Robbie Graham (4)
Billy Clarke (6-4-1) 30 saves/33 shots		Goalie stats		Marc Terriault (8-1-1) 39 saves/41 shots

Dieppe wins series 4-2

== Kent Cup final ==
=== Kent Cup final (1M) Dieppe Commandos vs. (4E) Truro Bearcats ===
Sun Apr 12	Dieppe Commandos	4-3	OT	Truro Bearcats	Arthur-J-LeBlanc Arena
Lindon Beckwith (3) - 11:22		First period		19:03 - Jimmy Soper (8)
Robbie Graham (5) - pp - 4:13		Second period		7:44 - sh - Alex Soumakis (5)
Mathieu Newcomb (4) - pp - 18:52		Third period		9:47 - Jordan Wentzell (3)
Ryan Langan (4) - 0:59		First overtime period		No scoring
Marc Terriault (9-1-1) 24 saves/ 27 shots		Goalie stats		Jacob Fancy (8-2-1) 42 saves/46 shots

Tue Apr 14	Truro Bearcats	2-5	Dieppe Commandos	Rath Eastlink Community Centre
Jordan McNaughton (5) - 9:38		First period	2:06 - Benji Curtis (2)
Daniel Perigo (5) - 18:32		Second period	9:21 - pp - Ryan Groom (3); 12:36 - Andrew Meredith (6); 18:49 - Ryan Langan (5)
No scoring		Third period	6:11 - pp - Andrew Meredith (7)
Jacob Fancy (8-4-1) 31 saves/36 shots		Goalie stats	Marc Terriault (10-1-1) 23 saves/ 25 shots

Thu Apr 16	Dieppe Commandos	3-2	Truro Bearcats	Arthur-J-LeBlanc Arena
No scoring		First period	9:19 - Jimmy Soper (9); 13:00 - Jordan McNaughton (6)
No scoring		Second period	No scoring
Lindon Beckwith (4) - 3:31; Ryan Chiasson (1) - 7:16; Ryan Chiasson (2) - 14:53		Third period	No scoring
Marc Terriault (11-1-1) 19 saves/ 21 shots		Goalie stats	Jacob Fancy (8-5-1) 28 saves/31 shots

Fri Apr 17	Truro Bearcats	2-5	Dieppe Commandos	Rath Eastlink Community Centre
Jake Primeau (2) - 5:45		First period	3:19 - Robbie Graham (6); 13:54 - Ryan Langan (6)
Jordan McNaughton (6) - 4:14		Second period	6:03 - Andrew Meredith (8); 18:27 - Robbie Graham (7)
No scoring		Third period	11:42 - pp - Jeremy Doucet (3)
Jacob Fancy (8-6-1) 28 saves/33 shots		Goalie stats	Marc Terriault (12-1-1) 21 saves/ 23 shots

Dieppe wins series 4-0

== Fred Page Cup Championship ==
Hosted by the Cornwall Colts in Cornwall, Ontario

Fred Page Cup Tournament

=== Round robin ===
Key; x = Clinched championship round berth; y = Clinched first overall

FPC Round Robin
Rank	Team	League	W-L-OTL	GF	GA	PTS
1	(Ontario) xy - Carleton Place Canadians	CCHL	2-1-0	9	6	6
2	(New Brunswick) x - Dieppe Commandos	MHL	2-1-0	11	7	6
3	(Quebec) x - Longueuil Collège Français	QJHL	1-2-0	10	12	3
4	(Ontario) Cornwall Colts	Host	1-2-0	6	11	0

==== Dieppe Commandos Schedule & Results ====
Wed Apr 29	(Ontario) Carleton Place Canadians	3-1	Dieppe Commandos	Cornwall Civic Complex
No scoring		First period	18:53 - pp - Robbie Graham (1)
Vinny Post (1) - pp - 7:13; Adam Lloyd (1) - 7:36		Second period	No scoring
Stephen Baylis (1) - pp - 9:22		Third period	No scoring
Guillaume Therien (1-0) 30 saves/31 shots		Goalie stats	Marc Terriault (0-1) 22 saves/25 shots

Final

Thu Apr 30	Dieppe Commandos	4-1	(Ontario) Cornwall Colts	Cornwall Civic Complex
Matthieu Newcomb (1) - 8:14; Robbie Graham (2) - 17:55		First period	8:01 - pp - Grant Cooper (1)
Mathieu Newcomb (2) - 9:45		Second period	No scoring
Ryan Langan (1) - Empty net - 19:14		Third period	No scoring
Marc Terriault (1-1) 27 saves/28 shots		Goalie stats	Denny Dubblestyne (0-2) 22 saves/25 shots

Final

Fri May 01	(Quebec) Longueuil Collège Français	3-6	Dieppe Commandos	Cornwall Civic Complex
Maxime Guyon (3) - pp - 15:02		First period	2:02 - Jeremy Doucet (1); 12:19 - Benji Curtis (1)
Charles Cote-Lagace (1) - 3:00		Second period	2:02 - Ryan Langan (2)
Maxime Guyon (4) - 14:49		Third period	0:21 - Brennan Bailey (1); 7:17 - pp - Mathieu Newcomb (3); 18:12 - empty net - Ryan Langan (3)
Kevin Darveau (1-2) 29 saves/32 shots		Goalie stats	Marc Terriault (2-1) 33 saves/38 shots

Final

Sat May 02	Dieppe Commandos	3-2	2OT	(Quebec) Longueuil Collège Français	Cornwall Civic Complex
Ryan Groom (1) - 11:59		First period		18:09 - pp - Maxime Guyon (5)
No scoring		Second period		No scoring
Robbie Graham (3) - 10:53		Third period		12:02 - Danick Porier (3)
Matt Bernier (1) - 11:28		Second overtime period		No scoring
Marc Terriault (3-1) 40 saves/42 shots		Goalie stats		Kevin Darveau (1-3) 67 saves/70 shots

Final

Sun May 03	(Ontario) Carleton Place Canadians	3-2	Dieppe Commandos	Cornwall Civic Complex
Stephen Baylis (4) - 14:28		First period	No scoring
Bryce Vanhorn (1) - pp - 15:35		Second period	No scoring
Willie Brooks (1) - pp - 14:27		Third period	3:53 - pp - Ryan Langan (4); 6:44 - pp - Robbie Graham (4)
Guillaume Therien (3-1) 30 saves/32 shots		Goalie stats	Marc Terriault (3-2) 28 saves/31 shots

Final

== Awards ==
All Star Team

- Allstar Goaltender - Blade Mann-Dixon - Valley Wildcats
- Allstar Forwards - Thomas Stavert - Summerside Western Capitals, Robbie Graham - Dieppe Commandos, Connor Donaghey - Yarmouth Mariners
- Allstar Defense - Jordan McNaughton - Truro Bearcats, Keaton Lubin - Woodstock Slammers

Individual Awards

- Player of the Year - Robbie Graham – Dieppe Commandos
- Defense of the Year - Jordan McNaughton – Truro Bearcats
- Goalie of the Year - Will King – Campbellton Tigers
- Rookie of the Year - Curtis Hastings – County Aces
- Top Scorer - Robbie Graham – Dieppe Commandos
- Top Goal-tending Duo - Matt Jenkins and Antoine Landry – Woodstock Slammers
- Community Leadership Award -
- Character Award - Robert Pelletier – Campbellton Tigers
- Playoff MVP - Robbie Graham - Dieppe Commandos
- Coach of the Year - Nick Greenough - Valley Wildcats
- GM of the Year -
- Moe Bent Builders Award -

Team Awards

- Eastlink Division regular season champions - Pictou County Crushers
- Meek Division regular season champions - Dieppe Commandos
- MHL President's Trophy winners - Dieppe Commandos
- Eastlink Division playoff champions - Truro Bearcats
- Meek Division playoff champions - Dieppe Commandos
- Kent Cup Champions - Dieppe Commandos
