= Artem Zub =

Russian ice hockey player (born 1995)

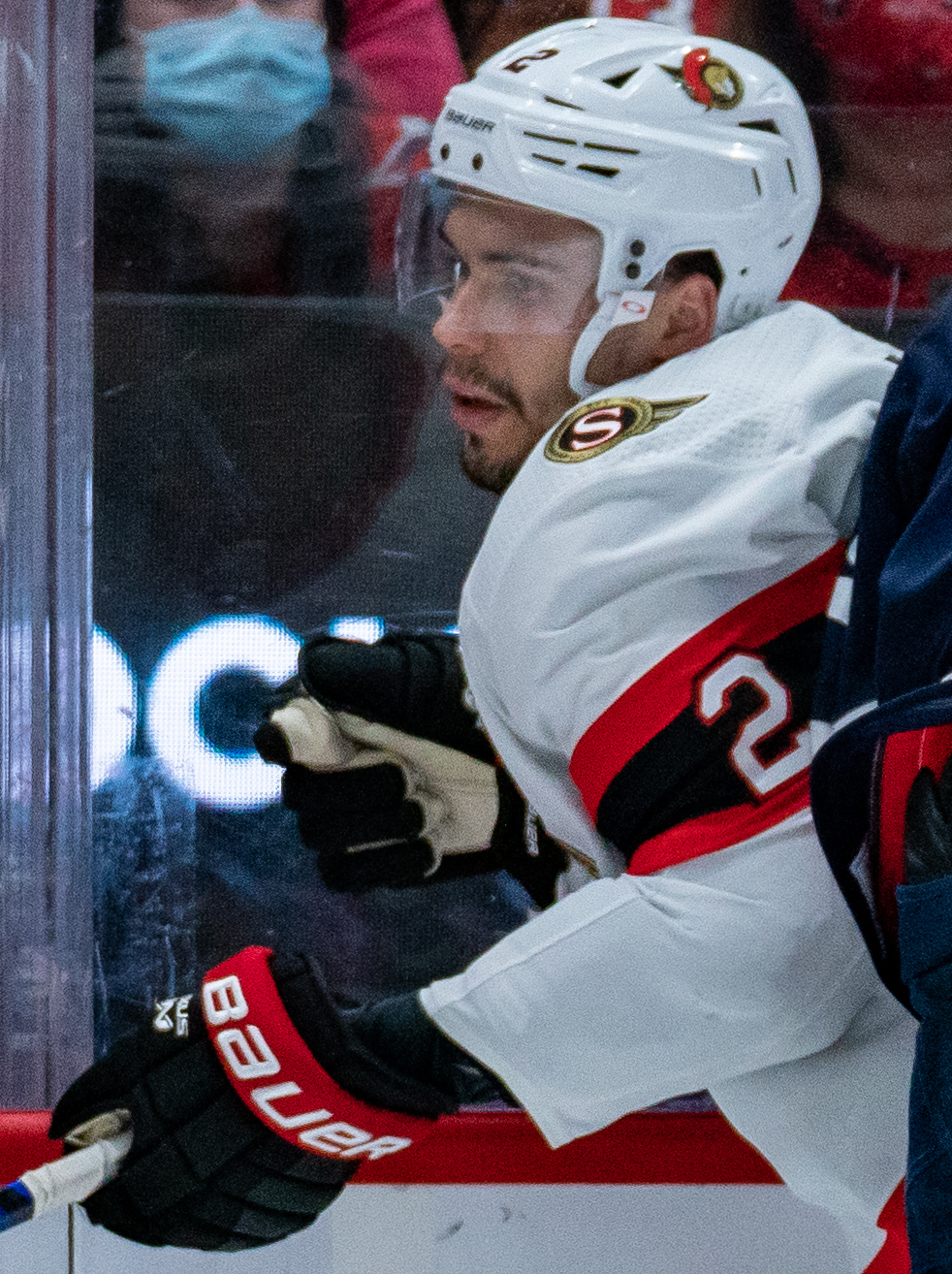
- Zub with the Ottawa Senators in 2022
- Born: 3 October 1995 (age 30) Khabarovsk, Russia
- Height: 6 ft 2 in (188 cm)
- Weight: 198 lb (90 kg; 14 st 2 lb)
- Position: Defence
- Shoots: Right
- NHL team Former teams: Ottawa Senators; Amur Khabarovsk; SKA Saint Petersburg
- National team: Russia
- NHL draft: Undrafted
- Playing career: 2011–present

Artyom Valerievich Zub (Russian: Артём Валерьевич Зуб; given name alternately spelled Artem; born 3 October 1995) is a Russian professional ice hockey player who is a defenceman for the Ottawa Senators of the National Hockey League (NHL).

== Playing career ==
=== Russia ===
Zub played as a youth with Amurskie Tigry Khabarovsk, the junior affiliate to Amur Khabarovsk. He made his senior debut with Amur Khabarovsk in the Kontinental Hockey League (KHL) during the 2014–15 season, appearing in seven games and registering one assist. He split the 2015–16 season between Amurskie Tigy Khabarovsk and Amur Khabarovsk, making 55 KHL appearances, recording two goals and five assists for seven points. He was named the KHL Rookie of the Month of October during the 2015–16 season. During the 2016–17 season, his third with Khabarovsk, Zub contributed with nine points in 32 games before he was traded to a powerhouse club SKA Saint Petersburg on 1 December 2016. Zub maintained a regular role on the SKA blueline to close out the season, making 18 appearances, recording one assist. In the post-season, he helped the club claim the Gagarin Cup.

In the 2017–18 season, Zub put up five points in the 36 games as SKA advanced to the playoffs again. They made it to the Western Conference finals where they were knocked out by CSKA Moscow. In 15 playoff games, Zub added five assists. In 49 games for SKA in the 2018–19 season, he added two goals and seven points. SKA made the playoffs where they met CSKA in the Western Conference finals and were eliminated again. In 18 playoff games, he tallied one goal and four points. In his final season with SKA Saint Petersburg in 2019–20, Zub set career highs in the KHL with 13 goals and 22 points in 57 games. The playoffs were abruptly ended during the first round due to the COVID-19 pandemic. As a result, the KHL terminated the season and awarded the championship based on the season's standings, with SKA coming in second place. Zub made one playoff appearance, going scoreless.

=== Ottawa Senators ===
Zub's play in the KHL and the Olympics attracted the attention of the National Hockey League (NHL)'s Ottawa Senators. On 1 May 2020, the Senators signed him to an NHL-standard entry-level contract as an undrafted free agent for one season. He made his Senators debut in the pandemic-shortened 2020–21 season, on 31 January 2021, in an 8–5 loss to the Edmonton Oilers. He registered his first NHL point in the game, assisting on Brady Tkachuk's first period goal. He scored his first NHL goal in a 6–5 overtime win against the Toronto Maple Leafs on 15 February 2021 at the Scotiabank Arena in Toronto. In his first season, he was regularly paired on defence with Ottawa's top defenceman Thomas Chabot. Upon joining the Senators he quickly solidified himself in the team's defence, seen as the Senators' best defensive defenceman. In 47 games with Ottawa, he tallied three goals and 14 points.

On 14 May 2021, Zub signed a two-year, $5 million extension with the Senators. The fans in attendance at the Canadian Tire Centre took to Zub, and called out "Zuub" when he played the puck. Zub, due to his limited English had to be reassured by his teammates that he was not being booed, and came to enjoy it. In the 2021–22 season, Zub steadied Ottawa's defence, playing on the team's top pairing with Chabot. He finished the season with six goals and 22 points in 81 games.

During the 2022–23 season, Zub struggled with injuries. On 27 October suffered an upper body injury that kept him out of the lineup until 18 November. On 2 December, Zub suffered a broken jaw after being struck in the face by a puck in a 3–2 win over the New York Rangers. On 21 December, Zub signed a four-year, $18.4 million extension with the Senators. Zub returned to the lineup on 30 December versus the Detroit Red Wings. Then on 14 January 2023, Zub sustained a lower body injury versus the Colorado Avalanche after blocking a shot. He returned to play in the 11 February 2023 game versus the Edmonton Oilers. He completed the season with 53 appearances, while recording three goals and ten points.

Zub's 2023–24 season was again shortened by injury. On 18 October, he was struck by a puck near the ear off a shot by Alexander Ovechkin and missed six games, returning in November. On 11 January 2024, he recorded a three-point game, assisting on goals by Drake Batherson, Brady Tkachuk, and Vladimir Tarasenko's game winner, in a 5–4 victory over the San Jose Sharks. He completed the season playing 69 games for Ottawa, marking five goals and 25 points.

The 2024–25 season began in a similar fashion as Zub suffered a concussion in October after taking a hit in a game against the Los Angeles Kings. His absence demonstrated his importance to the team's defence as he missed nine games, returning in November. Now playing on the top pairing with Jake Sanderson, he suffered a broken foot after blocking a shot in a game against the Vancouver Canucks on 23 November. He returned to the lineup on 2 January 2025 against the Dallas Stars. He finished the regular season with two goals and 13 points in 56 regular season games. The Senators qualified for the playoffs for the first time since 2017, and faced the Toronto Maple Leafs in the opening round. The Senators were eliminated in six games in their best-of-seven series. In the six games, Zub tallied one assist. In the 2025–26 season, Zub was once again playing with Sanderson and tied his career high in games played with 81, scoring five goals and setting a new career high of 30 points. The Senators made the playoffs and faced the Carolina Hurricanes in the opening round. In game one, Zub suffered an injury, missing the rest of the series. The Senators were swept in the first round by the Hurricanes.

== International play ==
Medal record

Ice hockey

Representing Olympic Athletes from Russia

Olympic Games
| Gold medal – first place | 2018 Pyeongchang | |

Representing Russia

World Championships
| Bronze medal – third place | 2017 Germany/France | |
| Bronze medal – third place | 2019 Slovakia | |

He played for the Russian national team and won bronze at the 2017 and the 2019 IIHF World Championships. He is a member of the gold medal-winning Olympic Athletes from Russia team at the 2018 Winter Olympics.

== Career statistics ==
=== Regular season and playoffs ===
| | | | Regular season | | | | | Playoffs |
| Season | Team | League | GP | G | A | Pts | PIM | GP | G | A | Pts | PIM |
|---|---|---|---|---|---|---|---|---|---|---|---|---|
| 2011–12 | Amurskie Tigry Khabarovsk | MHL | 3 | 0 | 0 | 0 | 0 | 7 | 0 | 0 | 0 | 0 |
| 2012–13 | Amurskie Tigry Khabarovsk | MHL | 59 | 2 | 2 | 4 | 26 | — | — | — | — | — |
| 2013–14 | Amurskie Tigry Khabarovsk | MHL | 14 | 1 | 1 | 2 | 28 | — | — | — | — | — |
| 2014–15 | Amurskie Tigry Khabarovsk | MHL | 39 | 1 | 10 | 11 | 70 | — | — | — | — | — |
| 2014–15 | Amur Khabarovsk | KHL | 7 | 0 | 1 | 1 | 6 | — | — | — | — | — |
| 2015–16 | Amurskie Tigry Khabarovsk | MHL | 4 | 1 | 0 | 1 | 8 | 3 | 1 | 1 | 2 | 2 |
| 2015–16 | Amur Khabarovsk | KHL | 55 | 2 | 5 | 7 | 53 | — | — | — | — | — |
| 2016–17 | Amur Khabarovsk | KHL | 34 | 2 | 7 | 9 | 11 | — | — | — | — | — |
| 2016–17 | SKA Saint Petersburg | KHL | 18 | 0 | 1 | 1 | 2 | 18 | 0 | 2 | 2 | 4 |
| 2017–18 | SKA Saint Petersburg | KHL | 36 | 0 | 5 | 5 | 12 | 15 | 0 | 5 | 5 | 4 |
| 2018–19 | SKA Saint Petersburg | KHL | 49 | 2 | 7 | 9 | 18 | 18 | 1 | 3 | 4 | 6 |
| 2019–20 | SKA Saint Petersburg | KHL | 57 | 13 | 9 | 22 | 22 | 1 | 0 | 0 | 0 | 0 |
| 2020–21 | Ottawa Senators | NHL | 47 | 3 | 11 | 14 | 26 | — | — | — | — | — |
| 2021–22 | Ottawa Senators | NHL | 81 | 6 | 16 | 22 | 60 | — | — | — | — | — |
| 2022–23 | Ottawa Senators | NHL | 53 | 3 | 7 | 10 | 39 | — | — | — | — | — |
| 2023–24 | Ottawa Senators | NHL | 69 | 5 | 20 | 25 | 32 | — | — | — | — | — |
| 2024–25 | Ottawa Senators | NHL | 56 | 2 | 11 | 13 | 34 | 6 | 0 | 1 | 1 | 2 |
| 2025–26 | Ottawa Senators | NHL | 81 | 5 | 25 | 30 | 57 | 1 | 0 | 0 | 0 | 0 |
| KHL totals | | | 256 | 19 | 35 | 54 | 124 | 52 | 1 | 10 | 11 | 14 |
| NHL totals | | | 387 | 24 | 90 | 114 | 248 | 7 | 0 | 1 | 1 | 2 |

=== International ===
| Year | Team | Event | Result | GP | G | A | Pts | PIM |
|---|---|---|---|---|---|---|---|---|
| 2013 | Russia | WJC18 | 4th | 7 | 2 | 0 | 2 | 2 |
| 2017 | Russia | WC | 3rd place, bronze medalist(s) | 10 | 0 | 2 | 2 | 10 |
| 2018 | OAR | OG | 1st place, gold medalist(s) | 6 | 0 | 4 | 4 | 0 |
| 2019 | Russia | WC | 3rd place, bronze medalist(s) | 1 | 0 | 0 | 0 | 0 |
| 2021 | ROC | WC | 5th | 6 | 0 | 1 | 1 | 4 |
| Junior totals | | | | 7 | 2 | 0 | 2 | 2 |
| Senior totals | | | | 23 | 0 | 7 | 7 | 14 |

== Awards and honors ==
| Award | Year |
MHL
| All-Star Game | 2015 |
KHL
| Gagarin Cup champion | 2017 |
