= 2016 Fred Page Cup =

Eastern Region Jr A Championship

Tournament details
- Venue: Carleton Civic Centre in Woodstock, New Brunswick
- Dates: May 4, 2016 – May 8, 2016
- Host team: Woodstock Slammers

Final positions
- Champions: Carleton Place Canadians
- Runners-up: Woodstock Slammers

Tournament statistics
- Games played: 8

The 2016 Fred Page Cup was the 22nd Canadian Eastern Junior A Ice Hockey Championship for the Canadian Junior Hockey League. The Woodstock Slammers hosted it for the first time in cup history. The tournament was held May 4th to May 8th at the Carleton Civic Centre in Woodstock, New Brunswick. The Carleton Place Canadians of the CCHL, entered the tournament as the defending champions and looked to three-peat as champions. The tournament champion qualified for the 2016 Royal Bank Cup held in Lloydminster, Saskatchewan hosted by the AJHL's Lloydminster Bobcats at the Lloydminster Centennial Civic Centre.

== Teams ==
- Woodstock Slammers (Host)

Regular Season: 32-10-6 (2nd MHL North Division)
Playoffs: Defeated by Dieppe (4-3).

- Pictou County Crushers (MHL Champion)

Regular Season: 25-18-5 (3rd MHL South Division)
Playoffs: Defeated Valley (4-2), Defeated South Shore (4-1), Defeated Dieppe (4-2) to win league.

- Carleton Place Canadians (CCHL Champion)

Regular Season: 43-16-3 (1st CCHL Robinson Division)
Playoffs: Defeated Pembroke (4-1), Defeated Brockville (4-0), Defeated Ottawa (4-3) to win league.

- Longueuil Collège Français (QJHL Champion)

Regular Season: 44-8-3 (1st LHJQ Alexandre Burrows Division)
Playoffs: Defeated Valleyfield (4-0), Defeated Terrebonne (4-1), Defeated Granby (4-0) to win league.

== Tournament ==
=== Round robin ===
Fred Page Cup round robin
Rank	Team	League	Ticket	W–L–OTL	GF	GA
1	y - Carleton Place Canadians	CCHL	Bogart Cup	3-0-0	14	6
2	x - Longueuil Collège Français	QJHL	Napa Cup	2-1-0	16	12
3	x - Woodstock Slammers	MHL	Host	1-2-0	16	15
4	Pictou County Crushers	MHL	Kent Cup	0-3-0	3	16

==== Schedule and results ====
All games played in Woodstock, NB.

Game	Away team	Score	Home team	Score	Notes
May 4, 2016
1	Longueuil Collège Français	4	Pictou County Crushers	1	Shots 42-26 LCF
2	Carleton Place Canadians	5	Woodstock Slammers	2	
May 5, 2016
3	Pictou County Crushers	1	Carleton Place Canadians	3	
4	Woodstock Slammers	5	Longueuil Collège Français	9	
May 6, 2016
5	Longueuil Collège Français	3	Carleton Place Canadians	6	
6	Pictou County Cruhsers	1	Woodstock Slammers	9	

==== Semifinal results ====
Game	Away team	Score	Home team	Score	Notes
May 7, 2016
SF	Woodstock Slammers	3	Longueuil Collège Français	2	Final/1OT

==== Final results ====
Game	Away team	Score	Home team	Score	Notes
May 8, 2016
Final	Woodstock Slammers	2	Carleton Place Canadians	4	Final

== Roll of League Champions ==
CCHL: Carleton Place Canadians
MHL: Pictou County Crushers
QJHL: Longueuil Collège Français
