= 2020 IIHF Women's World Championship =

Tournament details
- Host country: Canada
- Venues: 2 (in 2 host cities)
- Dates: 31 March – 10 April (cancelled)
- Teams: 10

The 2020 IIHF Women's World Championship was scheduled to be an international ice hockey tournament run by the International Ice Hockey Federation. It was scheduled to be contested in Halifax and Truro, Canada, from 31 March to 10 April 2020.

On March 7, 2020, the tournament was cancelled by the IIHF due to the COVID-19 pandemic.

== Planned participants ==
- Canada
- Czech Republic
- Denmark – Promoted from Division I A
- Finland
- Germany
- Hungary – Promoted from Division I A
- Japan
- Russia
- Switzerland
- United States

== Match officials ==
Twelve referees and ten linesmen are selected for the tournament.

Referees	Linesmen
(Canada) Elizabeth Mantha; (Canada) Lacey Senuk; (Finland) Kaisa Ketonen; (Finland) Anniina Nurmi; (France) Marie Picavet; (Germany) Tijana Haack; (Russia) Daria Yermak; (Slovakia) Nikoleta Celárová; (Sweden) Maria Furberg; (Switzerland) Anna Wiegand; (United States) Kaylen Erchul; (United States) Chelsea Rapin	(Austria) Julia Kainberger; (Canada) Alexandra Blair; (Finland) Jenni Heikkinen; (Finland) Linnea Sianio; (Germany) Lisa Linnek; (Russia) Diana Mokhova; (Sweden) Anna Hammar; (Switzerland) Magali Anex dit Chenaud; (United States) Jacqueline Spresser; (United States) Sara Strong

== Rosters ==
Each team's roster consists of at least 15 skaters (forwards, and defencemen) and two goaltenders, and at most 20 skaters and three goaltenders. All ten participating nations, through the confirmation of their respective national associations, had to submit a "Long List" roster no later than two weeks before the tournament.

== Preliminary round ==
The schedule was announced on 25 September 2019.

All times are local (UTC−3).

=== Group A ===
Pos	Team	Pld	W	OTW	OTL	L	GF	GA	GD	Pts	Qualification
1	United States	0	0	0	0	0	0	0	0	0	Quarterfinals
2	Canada (H)	0	0	0	0	0	0	0	0	0	Quarterfinals
3	Finland	0	0	0	0	0	0	0	0	0	Quarterfinals
4	Russia	0	0	0	0	0	0	0	0	0	Quarterfinals
5	Switzerland	0	0	0	0	0	0	0	0	0	Quarterfinals

First match(es) will be played: 31 March 2020. Source:
Rules for classification: 1) points; 2) head-to-head points; 3) head-to-head goal difference; 4) head-to-head number of goals scored; 5) result against closest best-ranked team outside tied teams; 6) result against second-best ranked team outside tied teams; 7) seeding before tournament.
(H) Host

31 March 2020; 15:30	Switzerland	Cancelled	United States	Scotiabank Centre, Halifax

31 March 2020; 19:30	Canada	Cancelled	Finland	Scotiabank Centre, Halifax

1 April 2020; 19:30	Russia	Cancelled	Switzerland	Scotiabank Centre, Halifax

2 April 2020; 15:30	Finland	Cancelled	United States	Scotiabank Centre, Halifax

2 April 2020; 19:30	Canada	Cancelled	Russia	Scotiabank Centre, Halifax

3 April 2020; 19:30	Switzerland	Cancelled	Canada	Scotiabank Centre, Halifax

4 April 2020; 15:30	United States	Cancelled	Russia	Scotiabank Centre, Halifax

4 April 2020; 19:30	Finland	Cancelled	Switzerland	Scotiabank Centre, Halifax

5 April 2020; 15:30	Russia	Cancelled	Finland	Scotiabank Centre, Halifax

5 April 2020; 19:30	United States	Cancelled	Canada	Scotiabank Centre, Halifax

=== Group B ===
Pos	Team	Pld	W	OTW	OTL	L	GF	GA	GD	Pts	Qualification or relegation
1	Japan	0	0	0	0	0	0	0	0	0	Quarterfinals
2	Germany	0	0	0	0	0	0	0	0	0	Quarterfinals
3	Czech Republic	0	0	0	0	0	0	0	0	0	Quarterfinals
4	Denmark	0	0	0	0	0	0	0	0	0	Relegation to 2021 Division I
5	Hungary	0	0	0	0	0	0	0	0	0	Relegation to 2021 Division I

First match(es) will be played: 31 March 2020. Source:
Rules for classification: 1) points; 2) head-to-head points; 3) head-to-head goal difference; 4) head-to-head number of goals scored; 5) result against closest best-ranked team outside tied teams; 6) result against second-best ranked team outside tied teams; 7) seeding before tournament.

31 March 2020; 13:00	Hungary	Cancelled	Czech Republic	Rath Eastlink Community Centre, Truro

31 March 2020; 17:00	Germany	Cancelled	Japan	Rath Eastlink Community Centre, Truro

1 April 2020; 17:00	Denmark	Cancelled	Hungary	Rath Eastlink Community Centre, Truro

2 April 2020; 13:00	Czech Republic	Cancelled	Germany	Rath Eastlink Community Centre, Truro

2 April 2020; 17:00	Japan	Cancelled	Denmark	Rath Eastlink Community Centre, Truro

3 April 2020; 17:00	Hungary	Cancelled	Japan	Rath Eastlink Community Centre, Truro

4 April 2020; 13:00	Germany	Cancelled	Hungary	Rath Eastlink Community Centre, Truro

4 April 2020; 17:00	Czech Republic	Cancelled	Denmark	Rath Eastlink Community Centre, Truro

5 April 2020; 13:00	Denmark	Cancelled	Germany	Rath Eastlink Community Centre, Truro

5 April 2020; 17:00	Japan	Cancelled	Czech Republic	Rath Eastlink Community Centre, Truro

== Knockout stage ==
There would have been a re-seeding after the quarterfinals.

=== Bracket ===
Quarterfinals
7 April
A1
B3
7 April
A2
B2
7 April
A3
B1
7 April
A4
A5

Semifinals
9 April
9 April

Final
10 April
Third place
10 April

=== Quarterfinals ===
7 April 2020; 13:00	N/A	Cancelled	N/A	Rath Eastlink Community Centre, Truro

7 April 2020; 15:30	N/A	Cancelled	N/A	Scotiabank Centre, Halifax

7 April 2020; 17:00	N/A	Cancelled	N/A	Rath Eastlink Community Centre, Truro

7 April 2020; 19:30	N/A	Cancelled	N/A	Scotiabank Centre, Halifax

=== 5–8th place semifinals ===
9 April 2020; 13:00	N/A	Cancelled	N/A	Rath Eastlink Community Centre, Truro

9 April 2020; 17:00	N/A	Cancelled	N/A	Rath Eastlink Community Centre, Truro

=== Semifinals ===
9 April 2020; 15:30	N/A	Cancelled	N/A	Scotiabank Centre, Halifax

9 April 2020; 19:30	N/A	Cancelled	N/A	Scotiabank Centre, Halifax

=== Fifth place game ===
The winner of this game earns a spot in Group A of the 2021 tournament.

10 April 2020; 13:00	N/A	Cancelled	N/A	Rath Eastlink Community Centre, Truro

=== Bronze medal game ===
10 April 2020; 15:30	N/A	Cancelled	N/A	Scotiabank Centre, Halifax

=== Gold medal game ===
10 April 2020; 19:30	N/A	Cancelled	N/A	Scotiabank Centre, Halifax
