= 2017–18 MHL season =

2017–18 MHL Season
- League: Maritime Junior Hockey League
- Sport: Hockey
- Duration: TBD
- Teams: 12
- TV partner: FastHockey
- Finals champions: Edmundston Blizzard

MHL seasons
- 2016–17 2018–19

The 2017–18 Maritime Junior Hockey League season was the 51st season in league history. The season consisted of 50 games played by each MHL team.

At the end of the regular season, the league's top teams competed for the Kent Cup, the league's playoff championship trophy. The team successful in winning the Kent Cup competed for the 2018 Fred Page Cup to determine the Eastern Canadian Champion.

== Team changes ==
The Dieppe Commandos relocated from Dieppe to Edmundston and are now known as the Edmundston Blizzard

== Regular-season Standings ==
Note: GP = Games played; W = Wins; L = Losses; OTL = Overtime losses; SL = Shootout losses; GF = Goals for; GA = Goals against; PTS = Points; STK = Streak; x = Clinched playoff spot y = Clinched division; z = Clinched first overall

Final Standings

Eastlink South Division	GP	W	L	OTL	SL	GF	GA	Pts.
Yarmouth Mariners	50	35	14	1	0	36	20	71
South Shore Lumberjacks	50	31	15	2	2	193	132	67
Amherst Ramblers	50	27	11	6	6	181	158	66
Truro Bearcats	50	28	20	1	1	150	130	58
Pictou County Crushers	50	21	24	3	2	157	173	47
Valley Wildcats	50	17	31	1	1	140	196	36

Eastlink North Division	GP	W	L	OTL	SL	GF	GA	Pts.
Edmundston Blizzard	50	36	10	4	0	180	137	76
Summerside Western Capitals	50	33	16	1	0	213	142	67
Campbellton Tigers	50	24	22	2	2	134	158	52
Miramichi Timberwolves	50	23	21	3	3	163	162	52
Woodstock Slammers	50	13	29	6	2	120	188	34
County Aces	50	12	36	0	2	112	215	26

== 2018 playoffs ==
Quarter-finals
1	Yarmouth	4
4	Truro	3
South Division
2	South Shore	4
3	Amherst	3
1	Edmundston	4
4	Miramichi	0
North Division
2	Summerside	4
3	Campbellton	1

Semi-finals
1	Yarmouth	4
2	South Shore	1
1	Edmundston	4
2	Summerside	3

Kent Cup Finals
1	Edmundston	4
1	Yarmouth	2
