= St. Stephen Aces =

- City: St. Stephen, New Brunswick
- League: Maritime Junior Hockey League
- Division: EastLink North (Roger Meek)
- Founded: 2014
- Home arena: Garcelon Civic Centre
- Colours: Navy blue, green, and light grey

Franchise history
- 2014–2016: County Aces
- 2016–2019: St. Stephen Aces
- 2019–2025: Fredericton Red Wings
- 2025-Present: Chaleur Lightning

The St. Stephen Aces were a Canadian junior ice hockey franchise from St. Stephen, New Brunswick. The team was a member of the Maritime Junior Hockey League and played in the Eastlink North Division. They played their home games in the Garcelon Civic Centre in St. Stephen, New Brunswick.

== History ==
The County Aces were founded in 2014 as an expansion team in the Maritime Junior A Hockey League The Aces were part of the Roger Meek (later renamed the EastLink North) Division and were the Maritime Junior A Hockey League's 12th team, bringing balance to the two divisions (6 teams each).

In their first two seasons, the Aces were one of the top draws at the gate despite their on ice struggles.

After playing their last game in the EastLink North Division Semifinal on March 23, 2019, rumours began to swirl around the future of the franchise in St. Stephen. Ownership kept the fans and community waiting to hear about the future of the team, although people in the community (including Mayor Allan MacEachern) felt the future did not look good for the team. On April 10, 2019, a local group came together, with the support of the town council, to try and purchase the team and keep it in St. Stephen. However, by that time an announcement was set for April 15 in Fredericton, and neither the League nor the team responded to the requests for a meeting.

On April 15, the Maritime Junior A Hockey League announced that the St. Stephen Aces had been sold to Global Centre Ice Inc. of Fredericton. The deal had been pitched to the League in March 2019, and the League had voted at that time in favour of the deal. The team was renamed as Fredericton Junior A Red Wings, with plans to begin play at Fredericton's Grant-Harvey Centre in the Fall of 2019.

== Season-by-season record ==
=== Regular season ===
Legend: OTL=Overtime loss, SOL=Shootout loss

Season	Division	Games	Won	Lost	OTL	SOL	Points	Goals For	Goals Against	Standing	
Season	Division	Games	Won	Lost	OTL	SOL	Points	Goals For	Goals Against	Division	MHL
2014–15	Roger Meek	48	6	40	0	2	14	106	273	12th	12th
2015–16	Eastlink North	48	10	36	2	0	22	124	242	6th	12th
2016–17	Eastlink North	50	16	25	6	3	41	183	216	4th	8th
2017–18	Eastlink North	50	12	36	0	2	26	112	215	6th	12th
2018–19	Eastlink North	50	20	27	3	0	43	138	174	4th	9th

=== Playoffs ===
Season	Quarter-final	Semi-final	Final
2014–15	Did not qualify		
2015–16	Did not qualify		
2016–17	0-4 Miramichi Timberwolves	Eliminated	
2017–18	Did not qualify		
2018–19	0-4 Summerside Western Capitals	Eliminated	
