= Bridgewater Memorial Arena =

Coordinates: 44.3758°N 64.5250°W

The Bridgewater Memorial Arena was a 1,200-seat multi-purpose arena in Bridgewater, Nova Scotia. It was home to the Bridgewater Lumberjacks ice hockey team of the Maritime Junior Hockey League. The arena opened in 1949. In 2015, the town council voted to close the arena due to financial issues.
