= Woodstock Slammers =

- City: Woodstock, New Brunswick
- League: Maritime Junior Hockey League
- Division: EastLink North (Roger Meek)
- Founded: 2000 (NBJBHL); 2003 (MHL)
- Folded: 2018
- Home arena: Carleton Civic Centre
- Colours: Victory green, black & white

Franchise history
- 2000–2018: Woodstock Slammers
- 2018–present: Grand Falls Rapids

Championships
- Playoff championships: 2012 Fred Page Cup; 2006, 2010, 2012 Kent Cup; 2000 Don Johnson Cup; 2000 NBJBHL Champions

The Woodstock Slammers were a junior "A" hockey team based in Woodstock, New Brunswick. They played as part of the Maritime Junior Hockey League (MHL). The team played their home games at the Carleton Civic Centre, formally known to fans as "Slammerland" or "Slammertown, Canada". The Slammers were a relatively successful team in their 18 year history, winning a NB Junior B League title and Don Johnson Cup (2000), three Kent Cups (2006, 2010, 2012), one Fred Page Cup (2012) and a silver medal at the RBC Cup (2012). In 2018, the franchise relocated to Grand Falls, New Brunswick, changing their name to the Grand Falls Rapids.

== History ==
=== The junior B years ===
The Woodstock Slammers Main Logo - 2000-2008

Prior to 2003, the Slammers were a junior B team in the New Brunswick Junior B Hockey League. In 2000, they won their only league championship against the Richibucto Bears and moved on to the Don Johnson Cup, the Maritime Junior B Championships. Even if they had lost the NBJBHL finals, the Slammers would have attended as they were granted the hosting rights. They played against the Cape Breton Alpines of the Nova Scotia Junior Hockey League, the Summerside Red Wings of the Island Junior Hockey League, the Conception Bay North Jr. Stars of the St. John's Junior Hockey League, and their rivals from Richibucto. The Slammers made the finals and defeated Cape Breton 4–1 to win their only Don Johnson Cup as Maritime Junior B Champions. The Slammers are the second of only three New Brunswick teams to have won the Don Johnson Cup, the first being the Richibucto Bears the year before and the latest being the Moncton Jr. Vitos in 2012.

=== Move to junior A ===
Entering the Maritime Junior A Hockey League in the 2003–04 season, the Slammers performed poorly as the newest members of the League. In both of their first two seasons, the Slammers finished 11th in the league and did not qualify for the playoffs. The community support made the new move to the "A" league work during the hard years.

=== The Tatarnic era ===
Following the first two seasons in the MJAHL, Jason Tatarnic was hired as the new head coach of the team. That same season the Slammers went from last in the League to finishing first, capturing their first ever President's Cup as the first place team at the end of the season. They then went on to capture their first ever Kent Cup championship and headed for the 2006 Fred Page Cup hosted in Pembroke, Ontario. They finished 0–3–0, losing to the Hawkesbury Hawks 3–0, Pembroke Lumber Kings 4–3 and the Joliette Action (the eventual Fred Page Champions) 7–6. However, this season was the best the Slammers had seen in many years and Tatarnic had cemented his place as coach and his place in Slammers' history.

In the 2007–08 season, the Slammers finished third in the league and made it to the Kent Cup finals for the second time in three years, losing to the Yarmouth Mariners.

The 2009–10 season saw the Slammers set two MJAHL records, first for most points in a season (92) and second for the longest undefeated streak (26 straight wins). Both records had previously been held by the now defunct Charlottetown Abbies. After finishing first in the regular season for their second President's Cup the Slammers moved on to the playoffs, defeating their Meek division rivals Summerside to move on to the finals. They defeated the Weeks Crushers to win their second MHL title under coach "Tarts".

The Slammers travelled to Brockville, Ontario, for their second Fred Page Cup tournament in team history. They faced the host Brockville Braves and lost 6–0, then lost to the Terrebonne Cobras 6–2 and the Pembroke Lumber Kings 7–4 to finish the tournament once again with a 0–3–0 record.

Following another banner year in 2010–11, the Slammers again finished first in the newly renamed Maritime Junior Hockey League (MHL) to claim their third President's Cup. This year, Summerside played the spoiler, defeating the Slammers in the seventh and final game of their Meek division final, further entrenching their divisional rivalry. The 2010–11 season was also the inaugural year for the Slammers' military night, a game night devoted to honouring the soldiers from the Canadian military. During the night of the game, soldiers from CFB Gagetown in Oromocto, New Brunswick, are bussed to the Carleton Civic Centre for the game.

In the 2011–12 season the Slammers once again made history. Going 13–0–0 to start their season, the Slammers set another MHL record, becoming the first team in the league to be ranked as the number one team in the country (Canadian Junior Hockey League) by points starting on October 24, 2011. The Slammers eventually reached 23 games without a loss before finally falling to the Amherst Ramblers 4–1 in regulation on November 26, 2011. Despite this loss, the Slammers remained the number one junior "A" team in the country until January 9, 2012, when they lost two games due to injuries and suspensions and were overtaken by the Penticton Vees of the British Columbia Hockey League, ending an 11-week reign.

On February 4, the Slammers clinched the MHL President's Cup championship as the best team in the regular season, defeating the Miramichi Timberwolves 5–2 in Miramichi. This President's Cup was the third straight for the Slammers, setting a franchise record and giving them home ice advantage throughout the playoffs. The Slammers then went on through the first two rounds, sweeping both the Campbellton Tigers and Summerside Western Capitals in four straight games each to win the Meek Division for the fourth time since 2005. They then took on the Yarmouth Mariners in the Kent Cup finals. The Slammers took a three to one lead in the series, then lost the next two games, leading to game seven in Woodstock's Carleton Civic Centre. The capacity crowd watched as the team honoured former captain Justin Bowers by retiring his #9 jersey, the third number to be retired by the team since 2003. They then watched their team lose a one-goal lead at the end of the third period, leading to a 3–3 tie and overtime. Just 2:57 into the third overtime period, assistant captain Robert Visca beat Mariner's goalie Charles Grant (the eventual playoff MVP) with a wrap around to win the game and the Slammers' third Kent Cup championship.

From April 25 to 29, the Slammers joined the Nepean Raiders, Titan de Princeville and host Kanata Stallions in Kanata for the 2012 Fred Page Cup. On April 25, the Slammers won their first Fred Page tournament game in franchise history, beating the host team 4–3 with the game winner being scored with only 3:00 remaining in the third. The Slammers then beat the Titan de Princeville 5–3 and the Nepean Raiders 3–2 to finish the round-robin in first place (3–0–0) and advanced straight to the finals. Facing Nepean in the finals, the Slammers finished the first 40 minutes of the game in a tie with the Raiders. 2:19 into the third period Sam Caldwell beat Matt Zawadzki to give the Slammers the 3–2 lead. The Slammers then killed three penalties thanks in large part to shot blocking and the outstanding performance of goaltender Matt Murphy (who stopped 42 of 44 shots) to win the game and their first ever Fred Page Cup.

Arriving in Humboldt, Saskatchewan for the Royal Bank Cup, the Slammers lost their first game 4–1 to the host Humboldt Broncos with their lone goal coming from defenceman Andrew Schriver at 11:74 of the third period — the first Slammers goal at a national championship. The Slammers followed this milestone with another, getting their first ever victory at the Royal Bank Cup, beating the Portage Terriers 4–1. This achievement was overshadowed however by a check from behind on Andrew Schriver, the Slammers' game one goal scorer, which resulted in a season-ending injury.

The Slammers went on to lose 2–1 to the Penticton Vees and 7–4 to the Soo Thunderbirds, finishing the preliminary round with a 1–3–0 record, tied with the Portage Terriers. Woodstock's victory over the Terriers earlier in the week, along with more goals scored and a higher plus-minus allowed the Slammers to reach the semifinals for the first time at the Royal Bank Cup. In the semifinals, the Slammers faced the host Humboldt Broncos. Down 2–0 early the Slammers rallied behind defenceman Tim Campbell's two goals to repeatedly tie the game. Their work paid off just 35 seconds into overtime when Ben MacSwain beat Humboldt's Matt Hrynkiw for the win. This upset moved the Slammers into the Canadian Junior "A" National Championship finals for the first time in their history and made them only the second team to make the finals in their first appearance at the Royal Bank Cup tournament.

Playing against the Penticton Vees in the finals, the Slammers came back from another 2–0 deficit and took a 3–2 lead into the third period. However, after receiving three straight penalties in the third period the Slammers lost the lead and the game 4–3, ending their season as the number two team in Canadian junior "A" hockey, their best finish in franchise history.

During the 2011–12 season the Slammers expanded the military night tradition to include a game on Remembrance Day which paid homage to Canadian Service personnel who fought and died in the line of duty throughout the history of Canada, as well as another game in February, bringing the total to three games per season.

In the same year, the Slammers welcomed their own incarnation of the now famous Green Men, the main difference between the two being the Woodstock group's addition of a third member. They attended most home games at the Civic Centre and, as with their Vancouverite predecessors, sat near the visitor's penalty box, where they could taunt the penalized players within.

In the 2012–13 season, the Slammers finished fifth in the MHL and second in the Meek division. In the playoffs, the Slammers made it to the Meek division finals before being ousted in four games by the Summerside Western Capitals.

The summer of 2013 brought major changes for the Slammers. For nearly a month following the season rumors began to circulate that the Slammers would be folding. On May 29, president McCain made an announcement stating that there would be changes over the next three seasons. McCain stated that he would be stepping down over the next three years with the town of Woodstock stepping into a greater role with the team.

However, the biggest change for the team was the dismissal of the coaching staff. Jason Tatarnic ended his tenure with the team with a record of 371 wins and 194 losses, three Kent Cups and a Fred Page Cup championship. President McCain stated the dismissal was not for a performance reason, but simply due to budgetary reasons.

=== Relocation to Grand Falls ===
On March 23, 2018, the team announced that they would be taking a one year leave of absence from the Maritime Hockey League for the 2018–19 season. However, on May 16, 2018, the league announced franchise's relocation to Grand Falls, New Brunswick, for the start of the 2018–19 MHL season. On June 6, 2018, the team announced they would be called the Grand Falls Rapids.

== Rivalries ==
=== Richibucto Bears (NBJBHL) ===
The earliest rivalry for the Slammers was with the Richibucto Bears of the New Brunswick Junior B Hockey League. In the 2000 NBJBHL playoffs, the Slammers defeated the defending Don Johnson Cup champion Bears to go to the championship tournament themselves. The Slammers won the Don Johnson Cup and, three years later, left the defunct NBJBHL to join the MJAHL, while their rivals moved to the New Brunswick Junior C Hockey League.

=== Provincial rivalries – Miramichi • Campbellton • Dieppe ===
Beginning with their first season in the Roger Meek Division, the Slammers have built up healthy rivalries between themselves and the Miramichi Timberwolves, Campbellton Tigers and Dieppe Commandos within New Brunswick. Their close proximity and competition for prominence in their division has evolved into three of the toughest rivalries in the MHL. The Slammers-Commandos rivalry became particularly intense in the 2011–12 season due to the rivalry between Slammer's captain Andrew Langan and his brother Ryan Langan playing in Dieppe.

=== Summerside Western Capitals ===
The best known and most fierce rivalry in Maritime Junior A Hockey, the Summerside Western Capitals – Woodstock Slammers rivalry has its roots in the 2009–10 Championship. That year, the Slammers and Capitals met in the Meek Division Final which the Slammers won, ending Summerside's chances of repeating as League and Fred Page Champions. The next year (2010–11), the two teams met once again in the Meek Division Final, with the Capitals taking the series in seven games.

During these past three seasons, the Capitals and Slammers have fought hard for Meek Division supremacy (both figuratively and literally), leading to numerous on-ice altercations at almost every game. The most notorious fight took place on September 26, 2008, in Woodstock. A fight broke out at center ice in the final minutes of the third period in a 4–3 game in favour of Summerside. While the combatants fought, no one else seemed interested in fighting, instead shouting at each other from a short distance. Then, a Summerside player approached the Woodstock bench, where he speared a player on the bench. This produced a bench-clearing brawl, which resulted in nine suspensions (totaling 28 games) between the two teams, as well as fines for both head coaches and both teams.

Another major episode of the rivalry took place on December 16, 2011, in Woodstock. Following a goal by the Slammers, a fight broke out in front of the Summerside net. The fighting then escalated to include all the players on the ice (even the goalies) and a player from each bench who jumped the boards to enter the fray. In total, the two teams combined for 170 penalty minutes, with 15 minor penalties, 6 major penalties, two ten-minute misconducts and 9 game misconducts being handed out by the official. Furthermore, suspensions were given to three Summerside players (totaling 18 games), two Woodstock players (one totaling 10 games, the other 8 games) and both teams' head coaches (Summerside 5 games, Woodstock 2 games).

=== Weeks Crushers ===
The Crushers – Slammers rivalry goes back to the Slammers undefeated streak in 2009–10. It was the Weeks Crushers who handed the Slammers their first overtime loss of the season, which, although it did not technically end their streak, was a blemish on an otherwise excellent record to that date. That same season, the Slammers and Crushers met in the MJAHL finals with the Slammers winning the series and the Kent Cup (their second). The rivalry with the Crushers has continued ever since.

=== Bay State Breakers ===
The Bay State Breakers and Woodstock Slammers rivalry began in 2007 after the Slammers defeated the Breakers at the Woodchuck Classic in Burlington, Vermont. The Breakers, originating in Rockland, Massachusetts, and playing out of the Eastern Junior Hockey League were a strong American team and attended an annual fall exhibition series hosted by the Slammers. The Bay State Breakers lead the series of exhibition matches by one victory, gained on November 30, 2012.

== Jerseys ==
When the Slammers joined the MJAHL in 2003 they brought their old junior B sweaters with them. These sweaters were copies of the 1998–2007 Dallas Stars jerseys, with the stripes of gold and green forming a star shape. These earliest jerseys had the original Slammers logo (the hammer-wielding Thor above the word "Slammers") on them.

Following the 2005–06 Fred Page Cup, the Slammers changed their jerseys. Their home jersey became white with a green band on the arms from shoulder to elbow. Below this band were three stripes, a thick gold one between two thinner black stripes. At the bottom of the jersey was the same three stripe configuration with a band of green below it. The away jersey was green with black bands from shoulder to elbow. The two stripes below the black band were gold above white, each of equal width. At the bottom of the jersey, there were a gold and white pair of stripes with a black band below them. These jerseys also had the original Slammers logo on them.

On January 16, 2009, the Slammers unveiled their first third jersey. It was an all-black sweater with white and green stripes on the collar, green, black, white stripes at the bottom of the sleeves with a green band below and the same configuration at the bottom of the jersey. The logo was replaced with the current main logo, depicting Thor's face and head from the front. This was the Slammers main logo beginning in the 2010–11 season up until the present.

The Alternate logo of the Woodstock Slammers on their third jersey in the 2011-12 MHL season.

The third jersey from the 2009–10 season was tweaked for use as the regular jersey beginning in the 2010-11 season until the present. The home jersey was made white with a thick green stripe across the center of the jersey and the elbow of both arms. Above and below this thick stripe are thin stripes of black. The bottom of the jersey has a black stripe above a green stripe above a white stripe. A green maple leaf was added to each shoulder to denote the team's location in Canada. The away jerseys is inverted, the black stripes being replaced with white ones, the jersey itself going from white to black.

Woodstock Slammers 2013 Alternate Logo

In the 2011–12 season the Slammers joined numerous sports teams across the world in unveiling their own vintage-style third jersey. It is a green jersey with white stripes running down the arms. Outside these stripes are a series of stripes coloured black, green, white, black, green, white, black and green starting at the collar. The collar itself has laces (in keeping with the vintage design) and the bottom of the jersey has a white then black stripe (in descending order) to the bottom of the jersey. The logo is a circle containing the team name around the Slammer's Head logo, with extending tabs that proclaim the teams establishing year as 2003.

At the start of the 2012–13 season, the Slammers introduced yet another alternate jersey, this one identical to the regular away jersey. However, the logo was changed from a forward facing head to a head in profile. This new jersey brought the Slammers total up to two regular jerseys and two alternates.

Woodstock Slammers 2011-12 Jerseys

== Season-by-season record ==
=== Regular season ===
Legend: OTL=Overtime loss, SOL=Shootout loss

Season	Division	Games	Won	Lost	Tie	OTL	SOL	Points	Goals For	Goals Against	Standing	
Season	Division	Games	Won	Lost	Tie	OTL	SOL	Points	Goals For	Goals Against	Division	MHL
2003–04	Roger Meek	52	18	30	3	1	-	40	230	266	6th	11th
2004–05	Roger Meek	56	22	28	5	1	-	50	231	269	6th	11th
2005–06	Roger Meek	56	41	10	0	5	-	87	281	170	1st	1st
2006–07	Roger Meek	58	14	35	0	9	-	37	168	245	5th	11th
2007–08	Roger Meek	58	39	13	-	4	2	84	198	142	2nd	3rd
2008–09	Roger Meek	54	34	14	-	1	5	74	203	150	3rd	4th
2009–10	Roger Meek	50	45	3	-	1	1	92	269	124	1st	1st
2010–11	Roger Meek	52	39	7	-	2	4	84	261	132	1st	1st
2011–12	Roger Meek	52	45	6	-	0	1	91	265	121	1st	1st
2012–13	Roger Meek	52	29	17	-	2	4	64	207	181	2nd	5th
2013–14	Roger Meek	52	28	20	-	1	2	59	200	189	3rd	7th
2014–15	Roger Meek	48	36	10	-	0	2	74	215	129	2nd	2nd
2015–16	Eastlink North	48	33	10	-	5	0	71	199	124	1st	1st
2016–17	Eastlink North	50	19	29	-	1	1	40	136	179	5th	9th
2017–18	Eastlink North	50	13	29	-	6	2	34	123	190	5th	11th

=== Playoffs ===
Season	Elimination Round	Quarter-final	Semi-final	Final
2003–04	Did not qualify			
2004–05	Did not qualify			
2005–06	Bye	4-0 Moncton Beavers	4-3 Summerside Western Capitals	4-1 Amherst Ramblers
2006–07	1-3 Restigouche Tigers	Eliminated		
2007–08	Bye	4-0 Moncton Beavers	4-2 Miramichi Timberwolves	2-4 Yarmouth Mariners
Season	Roger Meek Division Mini-series	Division Semi-final	Division Final	Final
2008–09	N/A	3-4 Miramichi Timberwolves	Eliminated	
2009–10	N/A	4-0 Dieppe Commandos	4-1 Summerside Western Capitals	4-1 Weeks Crushers
2010–11	N/A	4-1 Campbellton Tigers	3-4 Summerside Western Capitals	Eliminated
2011–12	N/A	4-0 Campbellton Tigers	4-0 Summerside Western Capitals	4-3 Yarmouth Mariners
Season	Eastlink Division Mini-series	Division Semi-final	Division Final	Final
2012–13	N/A	4-1 Dieppe Commandos	0-4 Summerside Western Capitals	Eliminated
2013–14	N/A	1-4 Dieppe Commandos	Eliminated	
2014–15	N/A	1-4 Miramichi Timberwolves	Eliminated	
2015–16	N/A	3-4 Dieppe Commandos	Eliminated	
2016–17	Did not qualify			
2017–18	Did not qualify			

=== Fred Page Cup ===
Eastern Canada Junior A Championships
The Eastern Canadian Junior A Hockey Championship is played annually between the winners of the MHL, QJHL, CCHL, and a Host team. It consists of round-robin play with the 2nd and 3rd place teams playing off in a semi-final to advance to a final against the 1st place team. Below are the results of the games in which the Slammers played.

Year	Round Robin	Semi-Finals	Finals
2006	0-3 Hawkesbury Hawks (CJHL)	Eliminated	
2006	3-4 Pembroke Lumber Kings (Host/CJHL) (OT)	Eliminated	
2006	6-7 Joliette Action (QJAAAHL) (OT)	Eliminated	
2010	0-6 Brockville Braves (Host/CJHL)	Eliminated	
2010	2-6 Terrebonne Cobras (QJAAAHL)	Eliminated	
2010	4-7 Pembroke Lumber Kings (CJHL)	Eliminated	
2012	4-3 Kanata Stallions (Host/CCHL)	Bye to Finals	3-2 Nepean Raiders
2012	5-3 Princeville Titans (QJAAAHL)	Bye to Finals	3-2 Nepean Raiders
2012	3-2 Nepean Raiders (CCHL)	Bye to Finals	3-2 Nepean Raiders
2016; Host	2-5 Carleton Place Canadians (CCHL)	3-2 Longueuil Collège Français (OT)	2-4 Carleton Place Canadians
2016; Host	5-9 Longueuil Collège Français (QJHL)	3-2 Longueuil Collège Français (OT)	2-4 Carleton Place Canadians
2016; Host	9-1 Pictou County Crushers (MHL)	3-2 Longueuil Collège Français (OT)	2-4 Carleton Place Canadians

=== RBC Cup ===
Canadian Junior A National Championship
The RBC Cup is the Annual National Junior A Hockey Championship, played between the winners of the Fred Page Cup (Eastern Champions), Dudley Hewitt Cup (Central Champions), ANAVET Cup (Western Champions), the Doyle Cup (Pacific Champions) and a host team. It consists of round-robin play with the top four teams playing off in semi-finals, followed by a final played between the winners. Below are the results of the games in which the Slammers played.

Year	Round Robin	Semi-Finals	Finals
2012	1-4 Humboldt Broncos (Host)	4-3 Humboldt Broncos (OT)	3-4 Penticton Vees
2012	4-1 Portage Terriers (Western)	4-3 Humboldt Broncos (OT)	3-4 Penticton Vees
2012	1-2 Penticton Vees (Pacific)	4-3 Humboldt Broncos (OT)	3-4 Penticton Vees
2012	4-7 Soo Thunderbirds (Central)	4-3 Humboldt Broncos (OT)	3-4 Penticton Vees

== Team captains ==
There is no information currently available to the public regarding the captains of the Woodstock Slammers prior to joining the MJAHL.

- Jeff Wilson, 2003–04
- Justin Bowers, 2005–06
- Jeff Conrad, 2006
- Dan Dooley, 2006–08
- Brad Jackson, 2008–09
- Brogan Bailey, 2009–10
- Robert Zandbeek, 2010–11
- Andrew Langan, 2011–12
- Ryan Purvis, 2012–13
- Brett MacLean, 2013–14
- Matthew Bursey, 2014–15
- Mackenzie Brown, 2015–16
- Jonny Erbs, 2016–17
- Jarred Toole, 2016–17
- Brendan Bornstein, 2017–18

== Retired numbers ==
Number	Player	Date	Years with Woodstock
6	Dan Dooley	September 19, 2008	2005–2008
9	Justin Bowers	April 20, 2012	2003–2006
19	Lachlan MacIntosh	February 18, 2011	2003–2006

== See also ==
- List of ice hockey teams in New Brunswick
- Don Johnson Cup
- Maritime Junior Hockey League
- Fred Page Cup
- Canadian Junior Hockey League

Preceded by Pembroke Lumber Kings	Fred Page Cup Champions; 2012	Succeeded by Truro Bearcats
