= Amherst Stadium =

Canadian arena

Coordinates: 45°49′37.3″N 64°12′0.9″W

The Amherst Stadium is a 2,200-seat multi-purpose arena in Amherst, Nova Scotia, Canada. It is home to the Amherst Ramblers Ice hockey team of the Maritime Junior Hockey League. The arena opened in 1959 and hosted the 1993 Centennial Cup. It also hosts various minor hockey contests and trade shows every year. The facility's nickname is "The Jungle". The rink also hosts the CCMHA minor hockey teams.

The rink in the arena measures 182 feet by 85 feet.

The arena also includes a heated room above the ice surface that is wheelchair accessible.
