= Consolidated Credit Union Place =

Facility in Prince Edward Island, Canada

Coordinates: 46.39788°N 63.80046°W

- Interactive map of Consolidated Credit Union Place
- Address: 511 Notre Dame Street
- Location: Summerside, Prince Edward Island, Canada
- Owner: City of Summerside
- Capacity: Summerside Capitals Hockey 4,228; Basketball 4,532; Volleyball in Stadium 4,528; Volleyball in Ice Pad 920 Swimming 400; Concert- Normal 4,197; Concert- End Stage 4,797; Concert- Centre Stage 6,728

Construction
- Groundbreaking: October 20, 2002
- Opened: March 1, 2007
- Cost: CA$42.5 million
- Architect: WHW Architects

Tenants
- Summerside Western Capitals (MHL) (2007–present); Summerside Storm (NBL Canada) (2011–2013)

Consolidated Credit Union Place (formerly known as the Summerside Wellness Centre) is a multi purpose facility that opened in two stages in April 2006 in Summerside, Prince Edward Island, Canada. It contains an aquatics centre, meeting and convention rooms, a fitness centre, two NHL size ice surface arenas, bowling lanes and an indoor walking track. The swimming portion (Phase 1) consists of a 25 metre competition pool, pleasure pool, a water slide, a water mushroom, a hot tub, steam room, and sauna. There is also a conference centre over 4,000 square feet (370 m^{2}) in size, and Iron Haven Gym, with two squash courts and weight lifting equipment. The second portion (Phase 2), the Arenas, were designed to replace Cahill Stadium and Steele Arena.

Beginning in the fall of 2011, the venue was home to the Summerside Storm of the National Basketball League of Canada until the team relocated to the Eastlink Centre in Charlottetown.

== History ==
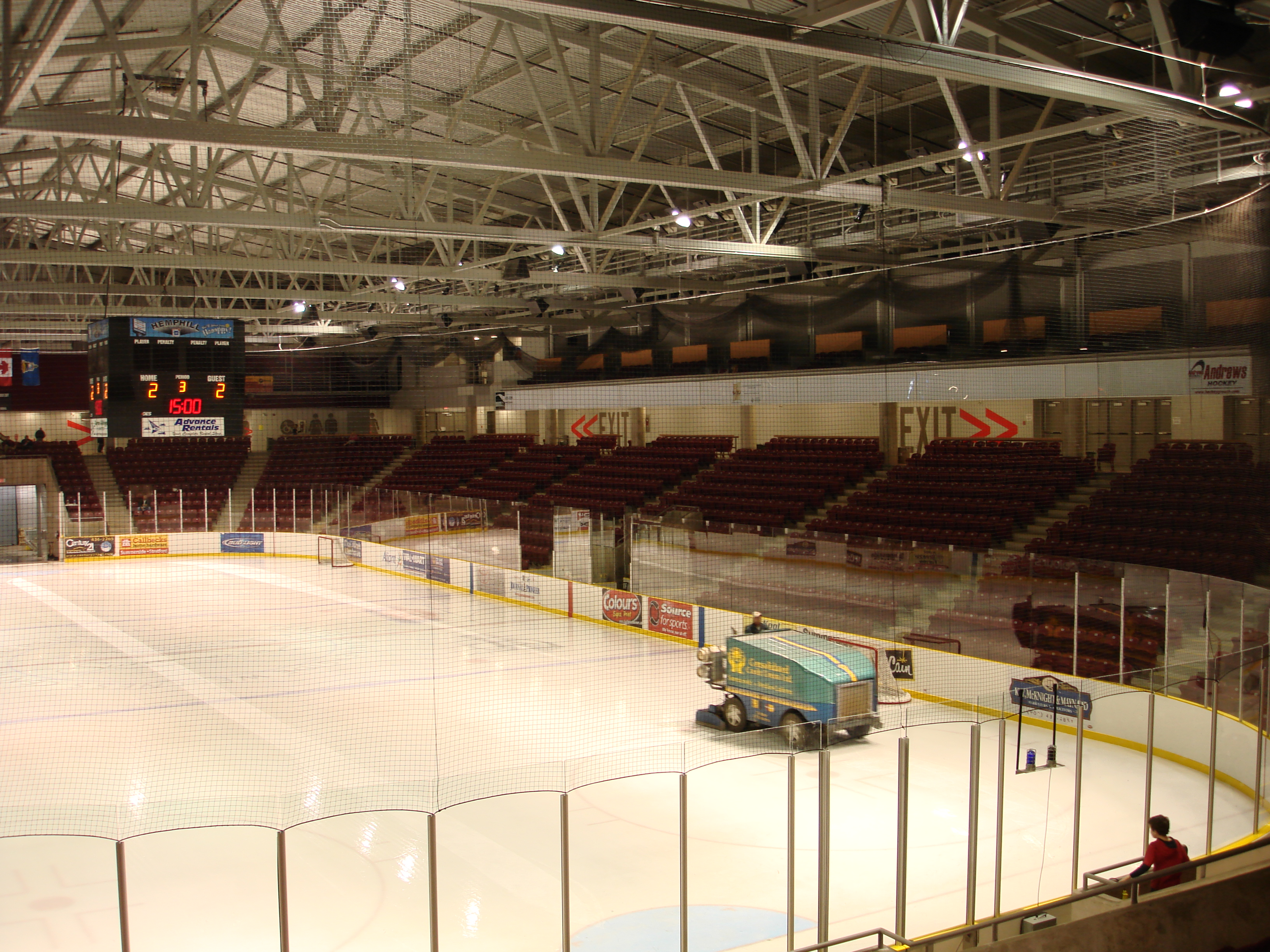
Main arena, with the main entrance/pool/fitness centre to the rear, bowling alley and VIP boxes to the right and second ice pad to the left

The 3,728 seat arena opened March 1, 2007, featuring a game between divisional rivals: the Summerside Western Capitals, and Charlottetown Abbies. The Capitals won the game 11–3 in front of 3,417 fans. The ice surface measures 200 x 85 Ft (61 x 26 m). The rink has ten luxury boxes lining the east wall, and has 8-foot (2.4 m) high glass surrounding the entire ice surface. The rink employs angled lights for the benefit of players in sports such as volleyball, so the lights do not shine into their eyes, and the scoreboard retracts into the rafters quite easily for shows requiring a high ceiling, such as a Monster Truck event. There is also a running track at the top of the seating bowl. These features make no difference for the game of hockey, but make the facility much more attractive in its mission of being a multifunction facility. The secondary ice surface consists of a 200 x 85 Ft (61 x 26 m) rink, as well as bleacher style seating for approximately seven hundred people. The secondary ice surface opened March 2, 2007. A new set of bowling lanes was opened in the facility as a replacement to the old lanes at Cahill Stadium.

There was a large explosion on the roof during construction, setting the construction back many months. The facility cost the City of Summerside approximately C$36 million, shared between the Municipal, Provincial, and Federal Governments.

The venue hosted the first ever National Hockey League game in Prince Edward Island when the Florida Panthers played the New York Islanders on September 27, 2008. The Islanders won the game 4–2 in front of three thousand and twenty nine spectators. The venue hosted the 2017 Kraft Hockeyville pre-season game between the Ottawa Senators and New Jersey Devils on September 25, 2017, with the Devils winning 8-1. On December 16 and 17 the CJHL Skills Competition and the Prospects game was held, seeing home town player Harrison McIver and Summerside Capitals Head Coach Kenny MacDougall being involved with team east. Team east won the skills competition 51-44 and won the Prospects game 6–3 in front of just over 1,000 people.

== Events ==
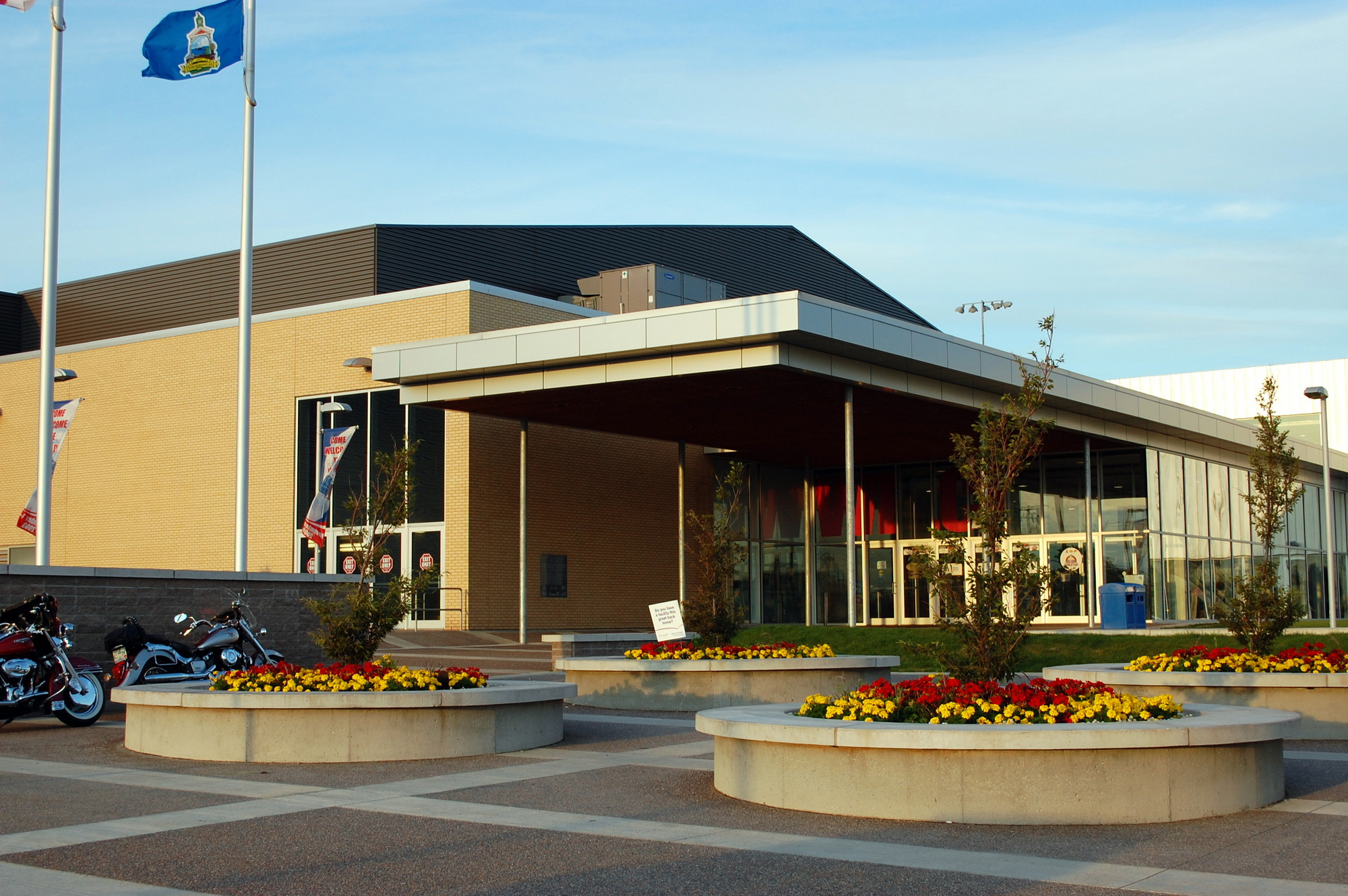
Forecourt and main entrance

=== 2026 ===
Credit Union Place was selected to host the national championship tournament of the Canadian Junior Hockey League, the 2026 Centennial Cup.

=== 2022 Events ===
Canada Cup of Wrestling, Blue Rodeo, Jann Arden, Atlanticade Motorcycle Festival, 16U Girls Baseball Nationals, Bryan Adams.

=== 2021 Events ===
Atlanticade Motorcycle Festival

=== 2020 Events ===
Queen Musical: We Will Rock You

=== 2019 Events ===
Blue Rodeo, Barbegazi Winter Action Sports Festival, Canadian Ringette Championships, Atlantic Judo Open, Junior National Table Tennis Championships, Eastern Gymnastics Championships.

=== 2018 Events ===
ZZ Top: The Tonnage Tour, Bryan Adams: The Ultimate Tour, Monster Truck Spectacular, Hedley: Cageless Tour, Roots & Boots: w/ Collin Raye, Sammy Kershaw & Aaron Tippin.

=== 2017 Events ===
Credit Union Place 10 Year Celebration, Travis Tritt, Bridgefest150 featuring Burton Cummings & Band with Jimmy Rankin, ADL Food Show, PCH Fundraiser: Grass Roots & Cowboy Boots, PEI Fall Flavours Signature Event: Beef & Blues, O'Leary Kraft Hockeyville NHL game: Ottawa Senators vs New Jersey Devils, Daniel O'Donnell: Back Home Again Tour, Home Hardware Road to the Roar Curling Pre-Trials.

=== 2016 Events ===
James Taylor & His All Star Band, Atlantic Judo Championships, Big Ticket Summer Concert featuring Daya, ADL Food Show, PCH Fundraiser: Grass Roots & Cowboy Boots, Flo Rida.

=== 2015 Events ===
FIVB World League: Canada vs. Bulgaria, Monster Trucks: Monster Spectacular, ADL Food Show, Harlem Globetrotters, Island Dodgeball Championships, Fall Flavours: Beef & Blues, PCH Fundraiser: Grass Roots & Cowboy Boots, Manheim Auto Show & Auction, Boys & Girls Club Celebrity Dinner.

=== 2014 Events ===
Brad Paisley, Chicago, Grand Slam of Curling Players Championship, Bryan Adams, Gordon Lightfoot, Toby Keith, Blue Rodeo, PEI Fall Flavours Signature Event: Beef & Blues, PCH Fundraiser: Grass Roots & Cowboy Boots, The Wiggles, PEI 2014 NYE Celebration: Burton Cummings, The Rankins, & Doc Walker.

=== 2013 Events ===
Credit Union Place hosted the national championship tournament of the Canadian Junior Hockey League, the 2013 Royal Bank Cup.

Alan Jackson, Sting, Reba McEntire

=== 2012 Events ===
John Mellencamp, Bryan Adams, Hedley, Charlie Pride

=== 2011 Events ===
On September 14 and 15, 2011, Elton John performed sold-out shows at Credit Union Place as part of his tour of the Canadian Maritime Provinces.

Harlem Globe Trotters, Rev Up Auto Show (Car Show), Joel Plaskett – in Concert, RCMP Musical Ride, Slowcoaster – in Concert, Summerside Lobster Carnival, Neverest – in Concert, These Kids Wear Crowns – In Concert, Alyssa Reid – In Concert, Playdates – In Concert, Hey Rosetta – In Concert, Boxer the Horse – In Concert, April Wine – In Concert, Racoon Bandit – In Concert, Elton John – In Concert (2 shows, both sold out), Jerry Seinfeld – In Concert Grand Slam of Curling Event, the Players Championship

=== 2010 Events ===
Atlantic Minor Midget "AAA" Hockey Championships, Steve Miller Band Live – in Concert, Relay for Life, Provincial Health Expo, Joel Plaskett – in Concert, The Stampeders – in Concert, Matt Andersen – in Concert, Cirque Festival, Summerside Lobster Carnival, The Trews – in Concert, Down With Webster – in Concert, Catherine Maclellan – in Concert, ELLIS FAMILY BAND/EDGE/Nathan Wiley – in Concert, Eastern Canadian Bantam Girls Softball Championships, Atlantic Canadian Peewee Baseball Championships, UPEI VS St Mary's, Men's University Hockey

=== 2009 Events ===
John Fogerty – in Concert (Sold Out), 2009 International Snowmobile Congress, 2009 Canadian National Arm Wrestling Championships, 2009 Atlantic Kart Racing Series, The Beach Boys – in Concert, Stompin' Tom Connors – in Concert, 2009 Canada Summer Games, 2009 Maritime Junior Hockey League Showcase, 2009 World Junior A Challenge

=== 2008 Events ===
NHL Exhibition Game – New York Islanders VS. Florida Panthers, George Thorogood – in Concert, Monster Trucks – Monster Spectacular, Arena Cross – Stuntapalooza, Blind Boys of Alabama – in Concert, 2008 Atlantic Arm Wrestling Championships, 2008 Atlantic Kart Racing Series, Cirque Estivale, Kenny Rogers – in Concert, 2008 Maritime Junior Hockey League Showcase, 2008 Canadian Junior Hockey League Prospects Game

=== 2007 Events ===
NHL – New York Islanders Blue/White Game, QMJHL – Cavendish Cup PEI Rocket vs. Moncton Wildcats, Trooper – in Concert, QMJHL – St Johns Fog Devils Training Camp, Charlie Pride – in Concert

== Name change and slogan ==
On Friday, February 29, 2008 the City of Summerside announced a ten-year deal that would see the Credit Union have the rights to the naming of the facility. This name replaced Summerside Wellness Centre. Another part of the deal saw all Credit Union members from around the world receive a 20% discount on public events. When Credit Union received naming right to the facility, they created a newly designed logo and slogan, "It all happens here".
