= AYR Motor Centre =

Arena in Woodstock, New Brunswick, Canada

- Interactive map of AYR Motor Centre
- Location: 105 Connell Park Road; Woodstock, New Brunswick; E7M 1M5
- Coordinates: 46.1609333°N 067.5849000°W
- Owner: The Town of Woodstock, New Brunswick
- Capacity: 836

Construction
- Opened: March 16, 1995
- Renovated: 2013-2015
- Expanded: 2013-2015

Tenants
- Woodstock Slammers (MHL) (2000–2018)

Website
- woodstocknbrecreation.wordpress.com/about/

The Carleton Civic Centre is an 836-seat multi-purpose arena in Woodstock, New Brunswick. The arena was built in 1995 and includes an indoor swimming pool, fitness center, community, and board rooms. It was home to the Woodstock Slammers ice hockey team of the Maritime Hockey League. and was known to fans as 'Slammerland".
