= Rath Eastlink Community Centre =

Sporting facility located in Truro, Nova Scotia

Coordinates: 45.3511°N 63.3049°W

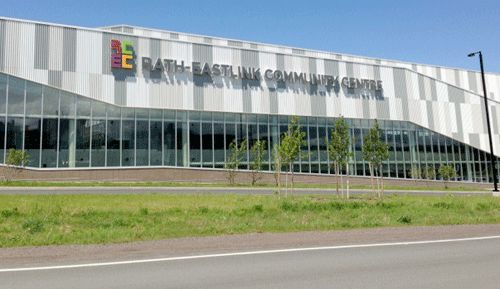
- Interactive map of Rath Eastlink Community Centre
- Location: 625 Abenaki Road; Truro, Nova Scotia; B2N 0G6
- Owner: The Town of Truro
- Capacity: Hockey 3,100; Concerts 3,600

Construction
- Groundbreaking: September, 2010
- Opened: March 2, 2013
- Cost: C$47.5 million

Tenant
- Truro Bearcats (MHL) (2013-present)

The Rath Eastlink Community Centre is a multi purpose sporting facility located in Truro, Nova Scotia. The facility features an NHL sized arena, a competition-sized (25m) swimming pool, a water slide, a fitness centre and, a rock climbing wall. The facility opened on March 2, 2013.

The opening day was set for fall 2012 but, was delayed due to a steel plant fire, and painting issues during construction of the arena.

== Inaugural game and hosting of the Fred Page Cup ==
The first hockey game, which coincided with the opening of the RECC, was held March 2, 2013 between the visiting Metro Shipbuilders and the Truro Bearcats. Attendance topped 2,800 opening night and tickets to the game were provided free of charge by the Bearcats. Various charitable groups were able to collect donations during the evening. EastLink TV televised the inaugural game; one that saw the Bearcats defeat the Shipbuilders 4–3.

The current single-night attendance record at the arena was set during a Maritime Hockey League game between the Weeks Crushers and Truro Bearcats. 3090 people attended game seven of the Eastlink division semi-finals between the two teams.

From April 30 to May 5, 2013 the Truro Bearcats hosted the Fred Page Cup Eastern Canadian Junior 'A' Hockey Championships at the RECC. The event was the first of its kind to be held at the new arena. The tournament was an overall success, and was a fitting cap to the Bearcats first season at the new arena. Truro won the championship, going undefeated, and claimed the right to move on to nationals by a score of 3–2 over the visiting Summerside Western Capitals in double overtime.

== Grand opening ==
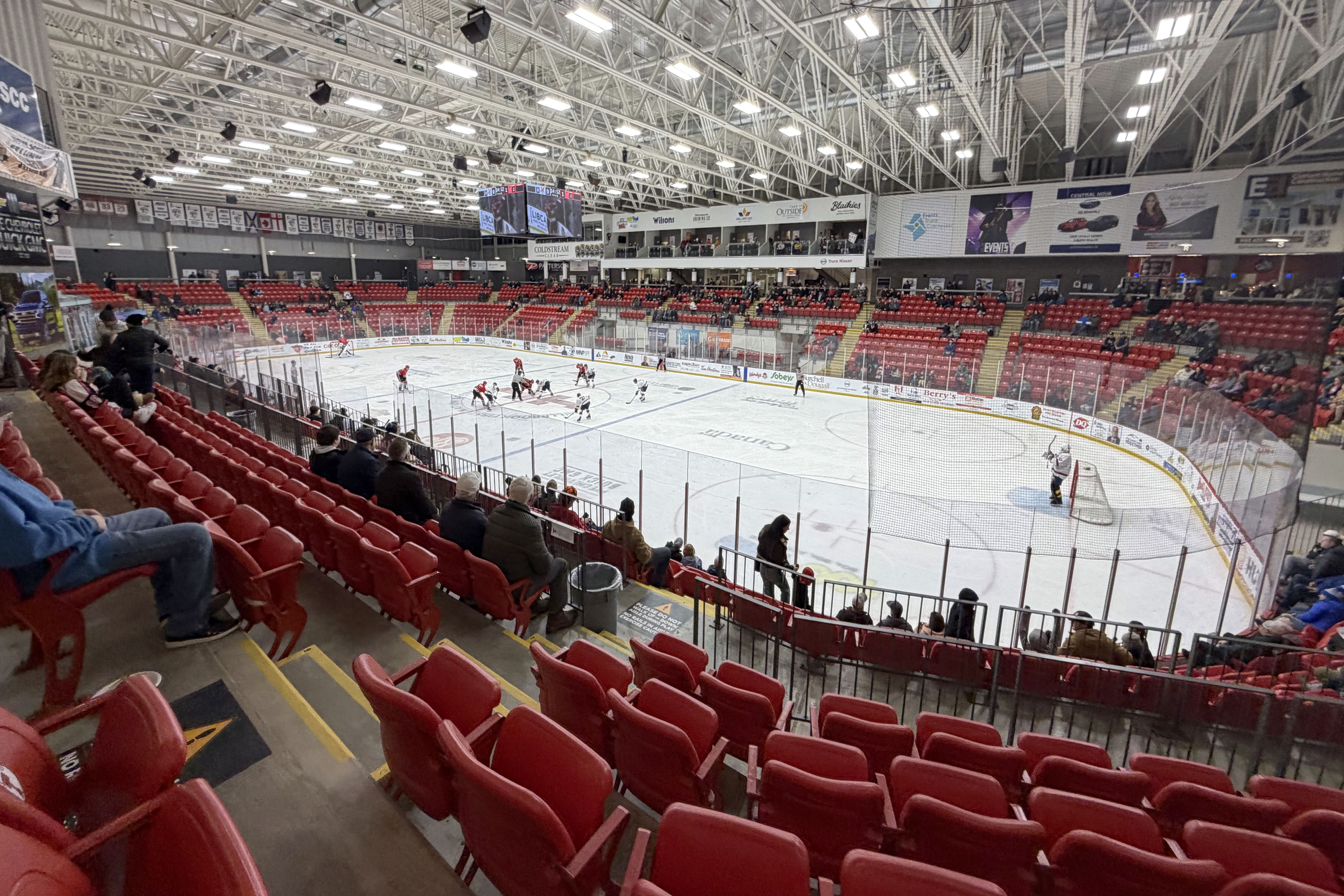
Interior view

The Rath Eastlink Community Centre held its official grand opening and ribbon cutting ceremony on September 28, 2013. April Wine performed that evening; marking the first concert held at the venue. Gloryhound is also scheduled to perform. All portions of the facility are open for use throughout the day.
