= Arthur-J-LeBlanc Arena =

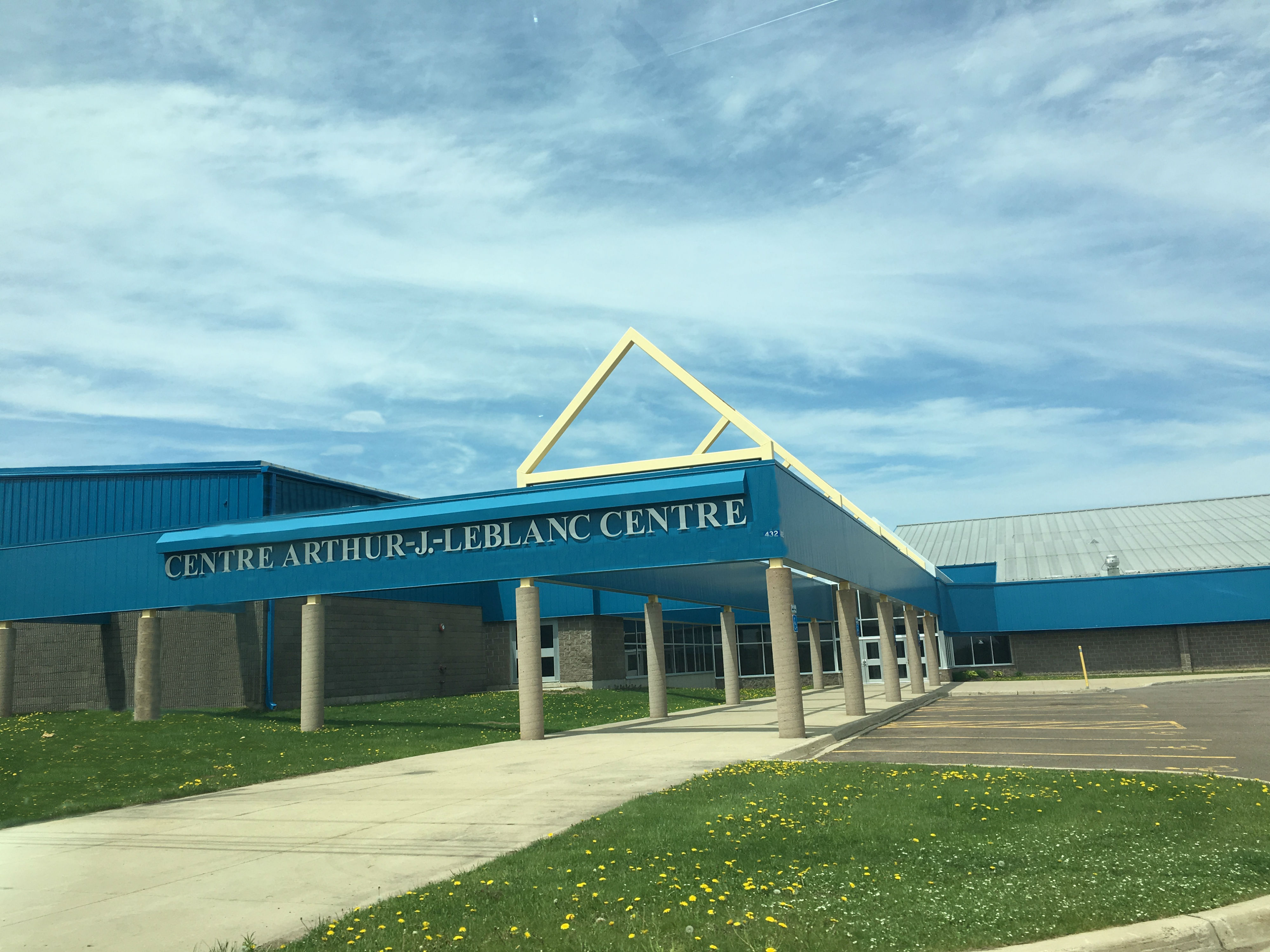
- The front of the Arthur-J-Leblanc Arena in Dieppe, New Brunswick

General information
- Location: 432 Melanson Road Dieppe, New Brunswick E1A 1A6
- Coordinates: 46.071235°N 64.715929°W

Other information
- Seating capacity: 595

The Arthur-J-LeBlanc Arena (French: Centre Arthur-J-Leblanc) is one of two arenas in Dieppe, New Brunswick.

The arena has two surfaces, one of which meets Olympic size requirements It is located at 432 Melanson Road, Dieppe, New Brunswick. It was home to the Dieppe Commandos prior to the club's relocation to Edmundston in 2017.

The arena is named after a local resident who built the first covered arena Arthur J. LeBlanc.
