= Pictou County Wellness Centre =

Canadian multi-purpose sports facility

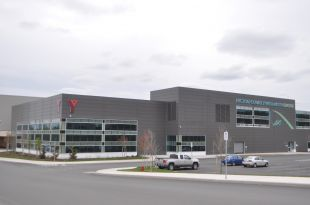
- Interactive map of Pictou County Wellness Centre
- Location: 2756 Westville Road; Westville Road, Nova Scotia; B2H 5E6
- Coordinates: 45.576637°N 62.676172°W
- Owner: The County of Pictou
- Capacity: Sobeys Arena 1,660 (Expandable to 2,835); Bell Aliant Arena 144

Construction
- Groundbreaking: August 8, 2010
- Opened: December 6, 2012
- Cost: C$35.0 million
- Builders: Pictou County Wellness Centre Building Authority, Inc.

Tenants
- Pictou County Crushers (MHL) (2012-present); 2014 Major Midget Atlantics

The Pictou County Wellness Centre is a multi-purpose sporting facility located in Westville Road, Nova Scotia. The facility features 2 NHL sized hockey arenas, an olympic sized swimming pool, a fitness centre and, a gymnasium. The facility opened on December 6, 2012. The opening day featured a MHL game between the Pictou County Crushers and the Bridgewater Lumberjacks.

There are two arenas in the Pictou County Wellness Centre, one being the main arena called the Sobeys Arena, and the other, an auxiliary arena named, the Bell Aliant arena. The Pictou County YMCA calls the Pictou County Wellness Centre home as they are the owners of the pool, gymnasium and, fitness centre.

In May 2013 it was announced that the John Brother MacDonald Stadium would be coming to a close to help with the opening year deficit from the Wellness Centre of $445,500 and put the usage of the arenas from 42% to 74%.

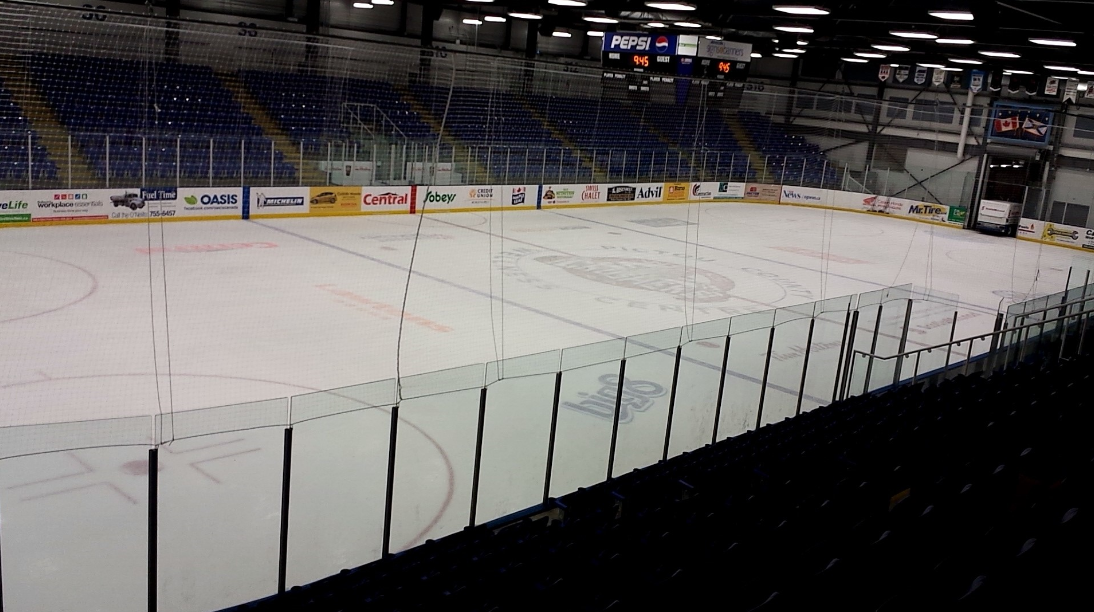
Interior view of the Sobeys Arena

Three hockey teams play in the Pictou County Wellness Centre. The teams are, the Pictou County Crushers of the Maritime Junior Hockey League, the Weeks Major Midgets and the Wearwell Bantam Bombers (formerly Scotsburn Major Bantam Crushers). The rinks also hosts the Bantam Memorial hockey tournament annually.
