= Pictou County Crushers =

- City: New Glasgow, Nova Scotia, Canada
- League: Maritime Junior Hockey League
- Division: Eastlink South Division
- Founded: 1967 (Halifax Colonels)
- Home arena: Pictou County Wellness Centre
- Colours: Red, Black and White
- Owners: Bruce Ryan & Scott Burden
- General manager: Willie MacDonald
- Head coach: Garrett Lambke
- Media: Crushers Official Site

Franchise history
- 1967–1973: Halifax Colonels
- 1973–1975: Halifax Blazers
- 1975–1977: Halifax Centennials
- 1977–1989: Halifax Lions
- 1989–1990: Halifax DQ Blizzards
- 1990–1991: Halifax Jr. Canadians
- 1991–1993: Halifax Mooseheads
- 1993–1994: Halifax Oland Exports
- 1995–1998: Dartmouth Oland Exports
- 1998–2003: Halifax Oland Exports
- 2003–2004: Halifax Team Pepsi
- 2004–Present: Weeks Jr 'A' Crushers

The Pictou County Crushers are a Canadian junior ice hockey team based in New Glasgow, Nova Scotia. They are in the Maritime Junior Hockey League's Eastlink South Division along with five other clubs. The Crushers play their home games at the Pictou County Wellness Centre.

== History ==
The Crushers originated in Halifax. The franchise, under various names in Nova Scotia's capital city, holds the MHL (formerly the MJAHL) record for most championships with 10. As the Halifax Oland Exports, they captured the 2002 Royal Bank Cup on home ice. Due to financial reasons, the team's name was changed to Halifax Team Pepsi for the 2003–2004 campaign.

In the spring of 2004, the Weeks Hockey Organization bought the club, moved it to New Glasgow. and renamed it the Pictou County Weeks Crushers. The team's name and logo are tied to its founding sponsor, Weeks Construction.

After struggling to attract fans in Halifax's crowded hockey market, the Crushers gained attendance in New GlasgowThe Crushers hosted the 2005 MJAHL All-Star Game and the 2006 MJAHL Entry Draft.

In April 2008, the Crushers were the Fred Page Cup host team. They shocked everyone as the underdogs defeated the defending FPC champion Pembroke Lumber Kings 4–1 in the championship game. With the victory, the Crushers advanced to their first ever Royal Bank Cup, in Cornwall, Ontario. They went 1–4 at the RBC, losing the semifinal game 3–0 to the Camrose Kodiaks.

In November 2012, the Crushers moved out of their former home John Brother MacDonald Stadium that they used from 2004 to 2012 and into the new Pictou County Wellness Center.

The Crushers won their first Kent cup in 2016 defeating the Dieppe Commandos in the final, they have also come close back to back years (2010,2011) by making it to the finals but they lost both times. In 2010 they lost to the Woodstock Slammers 4–1 and, in 2011 they lost to the Summerside Western Capitals 4–0.

== Season-by-season record ==
Season	GP	W	L	T	OTL	GF	GA	P	Results	Playoffs
Halifax Colonels/Blazers
1972–73	40	24	14	2	-	201	163	50	3rd MVJHL	
1973–74	34	23	8	3	-	211	123	49	3rd MVJHL	
1974–75	Statistics Not Available									
Halifax Centennials
1975–76	32	14	16	2	-	175	192	30	5th MVJHL	
1976–77	32	14	12	6	-	199	157	34	5th MVJHL	
Halifax Lions
1977–78	36	19	16	1	-	177	164	39	3rd MVJHL	
1978–79	34	23	8	3	-	200	107	49	1st MVJHL	Won League
1979–80	Statistics Not Available									
1980–81	39	30	4	5	-	294	127	65	1st MVJHL	
1981–82	40	23	13	4	-	211	184	50	2nd MVJHL	Won League
1982–83	39	22	13	4	-	--	--	48	2nd MVJHL	Won League
1983–84	40	30	6	4	-	358	183	64	1st MVJHL	Won League
1984–85	40	27	9	4	-	269	169	58	2nd MVJHL	
1985–86	40	20	18	2	-	230	220	42	3rd MVJHL	
1986–87	40	32	7	1	-	285	142	65	1st MVJHL	
1987–88	40	21	12	7	-	237	186	49	1st MVJHL	Won League
1988–89	40	20	12	8	-	271	201	48	2nd MVJHL	
Halifax DQ Blizzards
1989–90	40	25	12	3	-	313	181	53	2nd MVJHL	
Halifax Jr. Canadians
1990–91	39	25	8	6	-	219	157	56	2nd MVJHL	Won League
Halifax Mooseheads
1991–92	46	34	7	5	-	304	154	73	1st MJAHL	Won League
1992–93	48	26	14	8	0	290	228	60	1st MJAHL	
Halifax Oland Exports
1993–94	48	36	9	1	2	321	202	75	1st MJAHL	
1994–95	48	23	20	3	2	216	188	51	4th MJAHL	
Dartmouth Oland Exports
1995–96	54	30	21	3	0	324	274	63	3rd MJAHL	Won League
1996–97	56	36	15	3	2	321	242	77	1st MJAHL	
1997–98	52	34	15	2	1	286	205	71	1st MJAHL	
Halifax Oland Exports
1998–99	48	31	15	2	-	231	161	65	2nd MJAHL	
1999–2000	52	38	8	4	2	296	178	82	1st MJAHL	Won League
2000–01	52	33	19	0	0	232	188	66	4th MJAHL	
2001–02	52	38	8	4	2	260	135	82	1st MJAHL	Won League, Won FPC, Won RBC
2002–03	52	15	35	2	0	164	248	34	9th MJAHL	DNQ
Halifax Team Pepsi
2003–04	52	18	27	4	3	184	223	43	10th MJAHL	DNQ
Pictou County Crushers
2004–05	56	26	24	6	0	162	168	58	6th MJAHL	Lost Division Semi-Final
2005–06	56	31	19	0	6	173	170	69	4th MJAHL	Lost Division Final
2006–07	58	24	28	0	6	191	208	54	9th MJAHL	Lost Division Semi-Final
2007–08	58	35	21	-	2	246	180	72	5th MJAHL	Lost Division Final, Won FPC
2008–09	54	25	23	-	6	154	177	56	8th MJAHL	Lost Division Semi-Final
2009–10	49	27	21	-	1	159	157	55	5th MJAHL	Lost Final
2010–11	52	31	16	-	5	199	152	67	3rd MHL	Lost Final
2011–12	52	27	18	-	7	187	191	61	5th MHL	Lost Mini Series
2012–13	52	28	19	-	5	199	185	61	6th MHL	Lost Division Semi-Final
2013–14	52	35	12	-	5	204	137	75	3rd MHL	Lost Division Final
2014–15	48	29	14	-	5	182	167	63	3rd MHL	Lost Division Semi-Final
2015–16	48	25	18	-	5	172	143	55	7th MHL	Won Div. Semi-Final 4–2 (Wildcats); Won Div. Finals, 4–1 (Lumberjacks); Won League Finals, 4–2 (Commandos)
2016–17	50	38	9	-	3	265	145	79	1st MHL	Lost Div. Semi-Final 3–4 (Ramblers)
2017–18	50	21	24	-	5	157	173	47	9th MHL	DNQ
2018–19	50	22	21	-	7	170	178	51	8th MHL	DNQ
2019–20	52	29	21	-	2	174	159	60	8th MHL	Div. Semi-Final 0–0 (Ramblers). Playoffs Cancelled due to COVID-19 Pandemic.
2020–21	Season cancelled due to COVID-19 Pandemic									
2021–22	39	15	19	-	5	129	154	35	9th MHL	DNQ
2022–23	52	23	29	-	0	210	216	46	8th MHL	Lost Div. Semi-Final 4–0 (Mariners)
2023–24	52	21	27	4	0	223	217	58	3rd of 6 South; 6th of 12 MHL	Lost Div. Semi-Final 2–4 (Ramblers)
2024–25	52	25	21	5	1	242	228	56	4th of 6 South; 7th of 12 MHL	Won Div. Semi-Final 4–1 (Western Capitals); Won Div Finals4–0 (Bearcats); Lost League Finals 0–4 (Blizzard)

== Fred Page Cup ==
Eastern Canada Championships
MHL – QAAAJHL – CCHL – Host
Round robin play with 2nd vs 3rd in semi-final to advance against 1st in the finals.

Year	Round Robin	Record	Standing	SemiFinal	Gold Medal Game
2016	L, Longueuil Collège Français 1–4; L, Carleton Place Canadians 1–3; L, Woodstock Slammers 1–9	0–2–0	4th of 4	Failed to qualify for playoffs	

== Notable alumni ==
- Derrick Walser (NHL, KHL, NLA, DEL)

== See also ==
- List of ice hockey teams in Nova Scotia

Preceded by Camrose Kodiaks	Royal Bank Cup Champions; 2002	Succeeded by Humboldt Broncos
