= 2021–22 MHL season =

2021–22 MHL Season
- League: Maritime Junior Hockey League
- Sport: Hockey
- Teams: 12
- Finals champions: Summerside Western Capitals

MHL seasons
- 2020–21 (cancelled) 2022–23

The 2021–22 Maritime Junior Hockey League season was the 54th season in the league's history. Teams were scheduled to play 52 games each, but due to the COVID-19 pandemic teams played a reduced schedule.

== Regular-season standings ==
Note: GP = Games played; W = Wins; L = Losses; OTL = Overtime losses; SL = Shootout losses; PTS = Points; PCT. = Points percentage; x = Clinched playoff spot y = Clinched division; z = Clinched first overall

Standings decided by points percentage.

Final standing

Eastlink South Division	GP	W	L	OTL	SL	Pts.	PCT.
xy-Yarmouth Mariners	38	25	8	4	1	55	.724
x-Amherst Ramblers	37	19	14	2	2	42	.568
x-Truro Bearcats	36	19	15	2	0	40	.556
x-Valley Wildcats	38	19	16	2	1	41	.539
Pictou County Weeks Crushers	39	15	19	4	1	35	.449
South Shore Lumberjacks	39	7	28	2	2	18	.231

Eastlink North Division	GP	W	L	OTL	SL	Pts.	PCT.
xyz-Summerside Western Capitals	38	31	4	1	2	65	.855
x-Campbellton Tigers	36	23	8	4	1	51	.708
x-Fredericton Red Wings	36	22	12	2	0	46	.639
x-Edmundston Blizzard	37	21	11	1	4	47	.635
Grand Falls Rapids	39	14	23	1	1	30	.385
Miramichi Timberwolves	35	9	23	2	1	21	.300

== 2022 MHL Playoff bracket ==
Division Semi-finals
S1	Yarmouth	2
S4	Valley	4
South Division
S2	Amherst	1
S3	Truro	4
N1	Summerside	4
N4	Edmundston	1
North Division
N2	Campbellton	2
N3	Fredericton	4

Division Finals
S4	Valley	3
S3	Truro	4
N1	Summerside	4
N3	Fredericton	0

Canadian Tire Cup Final
S3	Truro	1
N1	Summerside	4

== 2022 MHL playoffs ==
- *=If Necessary

=== South Division Semi-final (1) Yarmouth Mariners vs. (4) Valley Wildcats ===
Fri Mar 25	Yarmouth Mariners	0-3	Valley Wildcats	Mariners Centre

Sat Mar 26	Valley Wildcats	2-3	2OT	Yarmouth Mariners	Kings Mutual Century Centre

Tue. Mar 29	Yarmouth Mariners	0-1	OT	Valley Wildcats	Mariners Centre

Thu. Mar 31	Valley Wildcats	4-2	Yarmouth Mariners	Kings Mutual Century Centre

Sat Apr 2	Yarmouth Mariners	4-1	Valley Wildcats	Mariners Centre

Sun Apr 3	Valley Wildcats	2-4	Yarmouth Mariners	Kings Mutual Century Centre

Valley wins 4-2

=== South Division Semi-final (2) Amherst Ramblers vs. (3) Truro Bearcats ===
Thu Mar 24	Amherst Ramblers	2-3	OT	Truro Bearcats	Amherst Stadium

Mon Mar 28	Truro Bearcats	4-3	2OT	Amherst Ramblers	Rath Eastlink Community Centre

Tue. Mar 29	Amherst Ramblers	4-2	Truro Bearcats	Amherst Stadium

Thu. Mar 31	Truro Bearcats	4-3	Amherst Ramblers	Rath Eastlink Community Centre

Sat Apr 2	Amherst Ramblers	1-3	Truro Bearcats	Amherst Stadium

Truro wins 4-1

=== North Division Semi-final (1) Summerside Western Capitals vs. (4) Edmundston Blizzard ===
Sat. Mar 26	Summerside Western Capitals	4-2	Edmundston Blizzard	Credit Union Place

Sun Mar 27	Summerside Western Capitals	3-4	2OT	Edmundston Blizzard	Credit Union Place

Thu Mar 31	Edmundston Blizzard	4-7	Summerside Western Capitals	Jean-Daigle Centre

Fri Apr 01	Edmundston Blizzard	2-5	Summerside Western Capitals	Jean-Daigle Centre

Sun Apr 3	Summerside Western Capitals	4-0	Edmundston Blizzard	Credit Union Place

Summerside wins 4-1

=== North Division Semi-final (2) Campbellton Tigers vs. (3) Fredericton Red Wings ===
Fri Mar 25	Campbellton Tigers	3-2	2OT	Fredericton Red Wings	Campbellton Memorial Civic Centre

Sat Mar 26	Campbellton Tigers	4-5	2OT	Fredericton Red Wings	Campbellton Memorial Civic Centre

Mon Mar 28	Fredericton Red Wings	3-2	Campbellton Tigers	Grant Harvey Centre

Tue Mar 29	Fredericton Red Wings	2-1	Campbellton Tigers	Grant Harvey Centre

Fri Apr 01	Campbellton Tigers	5-2	Fredericton Red Wings	Campbellton Memorial Civic Centre

Tue Apr 5	Fredericton Red Wings	2-1	Campbellton Tigers	Grant Harvey Centre

Fredericton wins 4-2

=== South Division Final (3) Truro Bearcats vs. (4) Valley Wildcats ===
Fri Apr 8	Truro Bearcats	2-3	Valley Wildcats	Rath Eastlink Community Centre

Sun Apr 10	Valley Wildcats	2-3	Truro Bearcats	Kings Mutual Century Centre

Tue Apr 12	Truro Bearcats	4-1	Valley Wildcats	Rath Eastlink Community Centre

Thu Apr 14	Valley Wildcats	4-1	Truro Bearcats	Kings Mutual Century Centre

Sat Apr 16	Truro Bearcats	2-4	Valley Wildcats	Rath Eastlink Community Centre

Mon Apr 18	Valley Wildcats	2-3	2OT	Truro Bearcats	Kings Mutual Century Centre

Wed Apr 20	Truro Bearcats	4-2	Valley Wildcats	Rath Eastlink Community Centre

Truro wins 4-3

=== North Division Final (1) Summerside Western Capitals vs. (3) Fredericton Red Wings ===
Sat Apr 9	Summerside Western Capitals	4-2	Fredericton Red Wings	Credit Union Place

Sun Apr 10	Summerside Western Capitals	4-1	Fredericton Red Wings	Credit Union Place

Thu Apr 14	Fredericton Red Wings	4-6	Summerside Western Capitals	Grant Harvey Centre

Fri Apr 15	Fredericton Red Wings	3-4	2OT	Summerside Western Capitals	Grant Harvey Centre

Summerside Wins 4-0

=== Canadian Tire Cup final (N1) Summerside Western Capitals vs. (S3) Truro Bearcats ===
Sat Apr 23	Summerside Western Capitals	4-0	Truro Bearcats	Credit Union Place

Tue Apr 26	Truro Bearcats	2-6	Summerside Western Capitals	Rath Eastlink Community Centre

Thu Apr 28	Summerside Western Capitals	1-2	OT	Truro Bearcats	Credit Union Place

Sat Apr 30	Truro Bearcats	1-5	Summerside Western Capitals	Rath Eastlink Community Centre

Mon May 2	Summerside Western Capitals	4-1	Truro Bearcats	Credit Union Place

Summerside wins 4-1
