= 2019–20 MHL season =

2019–20 MHL Season
- League: Maritime Junior Hockey League
- Sport: Hockey
- Teams: 12
- TV partner: FastHockey

MHL seasons
- 2018–19 2020–21 (cancelled)

The 2019–20 Maritime Junior Hockey League season was the 53rd season in league history. The season consisted of 52 games played by each MHL team.

At the end of the regular season, the league's top teams competed for the Canadian Tire Cup, the league's playoff championship trophy. The team successful in winning the Canadian Tire Cup has a chance to compete for the 2020 Fred Page Cup to determine the Eastern Canadian Champion, and if successful in winning, the team will then move on to compete for the 2020 Centennial Cup to determine the 2020 Junior 'A' champion.

== Team changes ==
The St. Stephen Aces relocated to Fredericton, NB becoming the Fredericton Red Wings.

== Regular-season standings ==
Note: GP = Games played; W = Wins; L = Losses; OTL = Overtime losses; SL = Shootout losses; GF = Goals for; GA = Goals against; PTS = Points; STK = Streak; x = Clinched playoff spot y = Clinched division; z = Clinched first overall

Final standing

Eastlink South Division	GP	W	L	OTL	SL	GF	GA	Pts.
Yarmouth Mariners	52	29	17	3	3	189	158	64
Amherst Ramblers	52	30	21	1	0	202	188	61
Pictou County Crushers	52	29	21	2	0	174	159	60
Truro Bearcats	52	26	18	3	5	170	166	60
South Shore Lumberjacks	52	26	22	3	1	182	186	56
Valley Wildcats	52	11	37	4	0	130	227	26

Eastlink North Division	GP	W	L	OTL	SL	GF	GA	Pts.
Summerside Western Capitals	52	42	7	1	2	259	145	87
Edmundston Blizzard	52	34	9	1	8	227	170	77
Campbellton Tigers	52	29	18	3	2	202	165	63
Fredericton Red Wings	52	28	18	4	1	176	161	61
Grand Falls Rapids	52	16	30	3	3	156	225	38
Miramichi Timberwolves	52	12	35	4	1	162	279	29

== Canadian Tire Cup playoffs ==
Quarter-finals
1	Yarmouth	0
4	Truro	0
South Division
2	Amherst	0
3	Pictou County	0
1	Summerside	0
4	Fredericton	0
North Division
2	Edmundston
3	Campbellton

Semi-finals

Canadian Tire Cup Finals
