= 2022–23 MHL season =

2022–23 MHL Season
- League: Maritime Junior Hockey League
- Sport: Hockey
- Teams: 12
- Finals champions: Yarmouth Mariners

MHL seasons
- 2021–22 2023–24

The 2022–23 Maritime Junior Hockey League season was the 55th season in the league's history. Teams each played a 52-game schedule, consisting of 26 home and 26 away games.

The Yarmouth Mariners won their 3rd league title, defeating the Edmundston Blizzard in 4 games.

== Regular-season standings ==
Note: GP = Games played; W = Wins; L = Losses; OTL = Overtime losses; SL = Shootout losses; PTS = Points; PCT. = Points percentage; x = Clinched playoff spot y = Clinched division; z = Clinched first overall

Standings decided by points.

Final standings

Eastlink South Division	GP	W	L	OTL	SL	Pts.	Pct.
xyz-Yarmouth Mariners	52	41	9	2	0	84	.808
x-Truro Bearcats	52	33	16	1	2	69	.663
x-Valley Wildcats	52	22	26	3	1	48	.462
x-Pictou County Weeks Crushers	52	23	29	0	0	46	.442
Amherst Ramblers	52	16	30	4	2	38	.365
South Shore Lumberjacks	52	10	39	2	1	23	.231

Eastlink North Division	GP	W	L	OTL	SL	Pts.	PCT.
xy-Edmundston Blizzard	52	38	13	0	1	77	.740
x-Summerside Western Capitals	52	45	13	3	0	73	.702
x-Campbellton Tigers	52	27	17	5	3	62	.596
x-Miramichi Timberwolves	52	26	18	7	1	60	.577
Grand Falls Rapids	52	21	29	1	1	44	.423
Fredericton Red Wings	52	20	28	2	2	44	.423

== 2023 MHL Playoff bracket ==
Division Semi-finals
S1	Yarmouth	4
S4	Pictou County	0
South Division
S2	Truro	4
S3	Valley	2
N1	Edmundston	4
N4	Miramichi	2
North Division
N2	Summerside	4
N3	Campbellton	3

Division Finals
S1	Yarmouth	4
S2	Truro	0
N1	Edmundston	4
N2	Summerside	0

Canadian Tire Cup Final
S1	Yarmouth	4
N1	Edmundston	0
