= 2023–24 MHL season =

56th season of the Maritime Junior Hockey League

- League: Maritime Junior Hockey League
- Sport: Ice hockey
- Duration: September – March
- Games: 52
- Teams: 12
- Total attendance: 310,728
- TV partner: Eastlink Community TV

2023 MHL entry draft
- Top draft pick: Zachary Boudreau
- Picked by: West Kent Steamers

Post-season
- League champions: Miramichi Timberwolves
- Runners-up: Summerside Western Capitals

Seasons
- ← 2022–23 2024–25 →

The 2023–24 MHL season was the 56th season of the Maritime Junior Hockey League (MHL). The Miramichi Timberwolves won their first league championship in franchise history.

== Season highlights ==
The South Shore Lumberjacks from Bridgewater, Nova Scotia relocated to Kent County, New Brunswick and were renamed the West Kent Steamers. The Summerside Western Capitals shifted from the North division to the South division.

Former MHL president, Troy Dumville, resigned after one year in the role to take up a scouting position with the Winnipeg Jets. The league appointed Connor Cameron as its new president.

The Canadian Junior Hockey League (CJHL) mandated the use of certified protective neck guards during all on-ice activities, including games and practices.

The Town of Truro, Nova Scotia, home of the Truro Bearcats, hosted the World Junior A Challenge, an international showcase featuring players from Canada, Slovakia, Sweden and the United States.

== Regular season ==
Teams played a 52-game regular season schedule, including 8 matches against each team in their division, and two against each team in the other division.

North division
Team	GP	W	L	OTL	SOL	Pts	GF	GA
Edmundston Blizzard	52	39	12	1	0	79	229	136
West Kent Steamers	52	34	16	2	0	70	187	151
Miramichi Timberwolves	52	31	16	3	2	67	211	182
Fredericton Red Wings	52	22	25	2	3	49	209	218
Campbellton Tigers	52	18	32	2	0	38	175	229
Grand Falls Rapids	52	15	33	1	3	34	150	214

Source: "2023-24 MHL standings". hockeydb.com.

South division
Team	GP	W	L	OTL	SOL	Pts	GF	GA
Summerside Western Capitals	52	38	5	3	6	85	274	170
Amherst Ramblers	52	27	20	3	2	59	204	216
Yarmouth Mariners	52	26	20	3	3	58	178	186
Weeks Crushers	52	27	21	4	0	58	223	217
Truro Bearcats	52	25	21	4	2	56	212	193
Valley Wildcats	52	10	40	2	0	22	179	319

Source: "2023-24 MHL standings". hockeydb.com.

=== Individual awards ===
Individual awards are voted on by the general managers of each team, except the leading scorer award which is based on overall points scored during the regular season. General managers may not vote for their own team.

- Player of the year - Ludovic Dufort, Miramichi Timberwolves (52 games, 82 points, 46 goals, 36 assists, second in power-play goals with 13, nine multi-goal games, 14 games with at least three points).
- Goaltender of the year - Nicholas Sheehan, Edmundston Blizzard (2,383 minutes played, 40 wins, 2.29 goals-against average, .926 save percentage, five shutouts).
- Defenceman of the year - Olivier Beaudoin, West Kent Steamers (49 games, 12 goals, 37 assists).
- Rookie of the year - Spencer Caines, Valley Wildcats (50 games, 67 points to finish atop the rookie scoring race).
- Character player of the year - Will Chisholm, Yarmouth Mariners (recognized for community involvement, work with minor hockey program and the Mariners Icy Knights group).
- Coach of the year - Phil Fife, Amherst Ramblers (27-20-3-2 record after taking over a team that missed the playoffs last season).
- Top goaltending tandem - Nicholas Sheehan and Samuel LeBlanc, Edmundston Blizzard (136 goals in 52 games).
- Regular season scoring champion - Carter McCluskey, Fredericton Red Wings (47 goals, 59 assists).
- Scholastic Player of the Year - Salem Johnson, Fredericton Red Wings.
- Community Spirit Award - Peter Amanatidis, Edmundston Blizzard.

Source: "League Awards". themhl.ca.

== Post-season ==
2024 League championship
Metalfab Cup

Tournament details
- Dates: 20 April – 26 March
- Teams: 8

Final positions
- Champions: Miramichi Timberwolves
- Runners-up: Summerside Western Capitals

Tournament statistics
- Games played: 36
- Goals scored: 247 (6.86 per game)
- Attendance: 63,504 (1,764 per game)

Awards
- Playoff MVP: Jack Flanagan

The top 4 teams from each division advanced to the playoffs. The Miramichi Timberwolves emerged as league champions despite their middling finish in the regular season. It was the Timberwolves's first league championship.

Quarterfinals
Edmundston	4
Fredericton	0
West Kent	1
Miramichi	4
Summerside	4
Yarmouth	1
Amherst	4
Weeks	2

Semifinals
Edmundston	0
Miramichi	4
Summerside	4
Amherst	2

Finals
Miramichi	4
Summerside	2

Source: "2023–24 MHL playoff results". hockeydb.com.

== Centennial Cup ==
The 2024 national championship tournament took place at the Sixteen Mile Sports Complex in Oakville, Ontario from 9 to 19 May 2024. The competition included all nine CJHL championship teams and hosts the Oakville Blades. The format consisted of a 4-game round-robin with two groups of five teams, followed by a six-team single-elimination play-off. The top team from each group of the round-robin had a bye to the semifinal round.

The Miramichi Timberwolves won 3 of their 4 games in the round-robin. In the quarterfinal round, they defeated fellow first-timers, the Navan Grads of the CCHL by a score of 8-4. The Timberwolves then lost to the Collingwood Blues of the OJHL by a score of 5-2 and thus were eliminated from the competition. The Collingwood Blues went on to win the competition after defeating the Melfort Mustangs of the SJHL in the final by a score of 1-0.

== Sources ==
- Healey, Pat (3 May 2024). "Historic moment: Foston, Wagner play key role as Timberwolves capture first-ever MHL championship". The Laker.
- Simmonds, Jason (18 April 2024). "MHL PLAYOFFS: P.E.I.'s Ross Martin enjoying successful first season as Miramichi Timberwolves GM". saltwire.com. Postmedia.
- Bernasiewicz, Lukas (7 May 2024). "Centennial Cup ready to hit the ice". Oakville News. Village Media.
- Dunick, Leith (13 May 2024). "Bombers drop third straight at Centennial Cup". NWONewsWatch.com. Dougall Media.
- "2024 Centennial Cup Guide & Record Book" (PDF). hockeycanada.ca. Hockey Canada.
- Tompkins, Ben (19 May 2024). "Melfort falls to Collingwood, earns runner-up at national championship". northeastNOW. Pattison Media.
- O'Flanagan, Rob (19 May 2024). "Mustangs fall short in Centennial Cup final". Melfort Journal. Postmedia.
- "2023 World Junior A Challenge | Hockey Canada". hockeycanada.ca.
- "2023 World Junior A Challenge Guide & Record Book" (PDF). hockeycanada.ca. Hockey Canada.
- "2023 MHL Entry Draft results". mhldraft.rinknet.com.
- "Eastlink Community TV to broadcast select MHL regular season games in 2023-24". themhl.ca (Press release). 29 August 2023.
- Simmonds, Jason (2 April 2024). "McGuigan voices displeasure about Caps being shut out of MHL individual awards". saltwire.com. Postmedia.
