= List of ice hockey teams in New Brunswick =

List of ice hockey teams from New Brunswick, past and present including the league

The following is a list of ice hockey teams in New Brunswick, past and present. It includes the league(s) they play for, and championships won.

== Minor Professional ==
=== American Hockey League ===
Team	City	Existed	Calder Cups	Notes
Fredericton Express	Fredericton	1981–1988	0	Became the Halifax Citadels in 1988
Fredericton Canadiens	Fredericton	1990–1999	0	Became the Quebec Citadelles in 1999
Moncton Hawks	Moncton	1978–1994	1	Also known as New Brunswick Hawks, Moncton Alpines and Moncton Golden Flames during their tenure
Saint John Flames	Saint John	1993–2003	1	Became Omaha Ak-Sar-Ben Knights in 2005

== Junior ==
=== Quebec Maritimes Junior Hockey League ===
Team	City	Established	President's Cups	Memorial Cups	Notes
Acadie-Bathurst Titan	Bathurst	1998	2	1	Founded in 1972 as the Rosemont National
Moncton Wildcats	Moncton	1995	3	0	Known in their first year as the Moncton Alpines
Saint John Sea Dogs	Saint John	2005	3	2	

=== Maritime Junior A Hockey League ===
Team	City	Established	League titles	Fred Page Cups	Royal Bank Cups	Notes
Campbellton Tigers	Campbellton	1996	1	0	0	Founded as Campbellton Tigers, later Restigouche River Rats, later reverted to Campbellton Tigers.
Edmundston Blizzard	Edmundston	1983	2	1	0	Formerly known as the Moncton Beavers and later the Dieppe Commandos, moved to Edmundston in 2017.
Fredericton Red Wings	Fredericton	2014	0	0	0	Formerly known as the St. Stephen Aces, moved to Fredericton in 2019
Grand Falls Rapids	Grand Falls	2003	1	1	0	Formerly known as the Woodstock Slammers, moved to Grand Falls in 2018
Miramichi Timberwolves	Miramichi	2000	1	0	0	

=== Junior B Hockey Leagues ===
League	Region	Established	Don Johnson Cups	Maritime-Hockey North Junior C Championships	Notes
New Brunswick Junior B Hockey League	New Brunswick	2009	2	2	Previously operated as the original New Brunswick Junior B Hockey League (1983–2003). Bottom-tier teams collectively play for the Junior C league title and represent the NBJHL at the Maritime-Hockey North Junior C Championship.

=== Junior C Hockey Leagues ===
League	Region	Existed	Maritime-Hockey North Junior C Championships	Notes
New Brunswick Junior C Hockey League	New Brunswick	2003–2011	4	

== Semi-professional, senior and amateur ==
=== Senior ===
Team	City	Existed	League titles	Allan Cups	Notes
Sackville Combines	Sackville	c. 1970s–	2	0	At least two league titles have been won: 1989–90 and 1998–99. The team has existed in one form or another dating to at least the 1970s, and likely predates the 1970s.
St. Stephen Sea Hawks	St. Stephen	1997	0	0	0
Saint John Blackhawks	Saint John	2004	0	0	0
Grand Lake Thrashers	Grand Lake	????	0	0	0
Blacks Harbour Silverkings	Blacks Harbour	2000	0	0	0
Nackawic Senior Hawks	Nackawic-Millville	2004	2	0	0
River Valley Rock		2000	0	0	0
Cap-Pele Pecheurs	Cap-Pele	????	0	0	0
Bas-Madawaska Draveurs	St-Léonard	1998	1	0	0
Grand-Sault Cataractes	Grand-Sault	1991	7	0	0
Haut-Madawaska Pantheres	St-Francois de Madawaska	1991	0	0	0
Perth-Andover River Valley Thunder	Perth-Andover	1997	0	0	Known as the Perth Andover Rapids, then the River Valley Thunder
Saint-Basile As	Saint-Basile	1991–2007, 2008–present	6	0	0
Saint-Quentin Castors	Saint-Quentin	1991	1	0	0
Saint-Jacques Ambassadeurs	Saint-Jacques	1991	2	0	0

=== University ===
Team	City	Established	Conference titles	University Cups	Women's Titles	Notes
Moncton Aigles Bleu	Moncton	????	11	4	0	
Mount Allison Mounties	Sackville	????	6	0	0	Since 1997 has not played CIS men's hockey, only women's hockey
St. Thomas Tommies	Fredericton	????	2	0	0	
UNB Varsity Reds	Fredericton	????	9	6	0	

== League, regional and national championships ==
Championship	Times won	Description
Calder Cup	2	American Hockey League champion
President's Cup	8	Quebec Maritimes Junior Hockey League champion
Memorial Cup	3	Canadian Major-Junior national champion
Allan Cup	3	Canadian senior national champion
Canadian Tire Cup	10	Maritime Junior A Hockey League championship (formerly the Kent Cup)
Fred Page Cup	2	Eastern Canada Junior "A" regional championship
National Junior A Championship	0	Canadian Junior "A" national champion (formerly the RBC Cup)
Don Johnson Cup	3	Atlantic Canada Junior B champion
Maritime-Hockey North Championship	6	Regional Junior "C" Champion
David Johnston University Cup	9	CIS national men's university champion

== See also ==
- Hockey New Brunswick
- 2006 Memorial Cup
