= Fredericton Red Wings =

Canadian junior hockey club

- City: Fredericton
- League: Maritime Junior Hockey League
- Division: EastLink North
- Operated: 2019–2025
- Home arena: Grant-Harvey Centre
- Colours: Red and white
- Owner: Global Centre Ice Inc.
- General manager: Kyle McAllister
- Head coach: Kyle McAllister
- Website: frederictonredwings.com

Franchise history
- 2014–2016: County Aces
- 2016–2019: St. Stephen Aces
- 2019–2025: Fredericton Red Wings
- 2025–present: Chaleur Lightning

The Fredericton Red Wings were a Junior ice hockey team based in Fredericton, New Brunswick. In 2025, the team relocated to the City of Bathurst, New Brunswick and was rebranded as the Chaleur Lightning.

== History ==
The County Aces were founded in 2014 as an expansion team in the Maritime Junior A Hockey League. The Aces played their home games at the Garcelon Civic Centre in St. Stephen, New Brunswick. In 2016 the team changed their name to the St. Stephen Aces.

=== The rebirth of a tradition ===
In March 2019, the MHL was approached by Global Centre Ice Inc. of Fredericton, to make a pitch for the purchase of the St. Stephen franchise. The team had been struggling financially for three years prior to the 2018–19 season, and the owners had made the difficult decision to sell the team. The MHL was impressed by the pitch made by Global Centre Ice Inc., and approved the sale of the team prior to the end of the Aces' playoff run that year. On April 15, the team and the League made the official announcement of the move, and announced that the team, named the Fredericton Red Wings, would begin play in the 2019–2020 season, with the announcement accompanied by the slogan "A Rebirth of a Hockey Tradition".

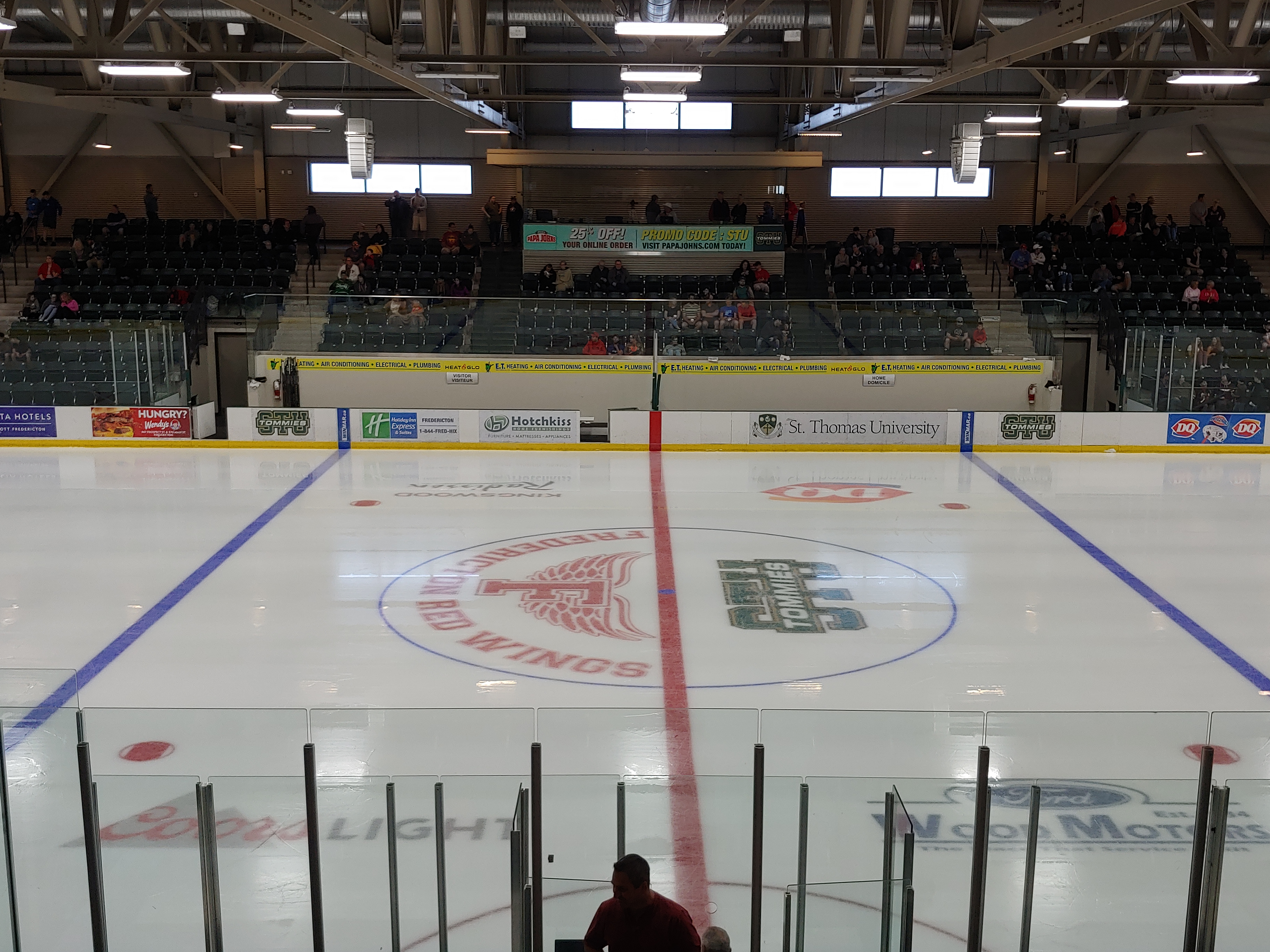
Center Ice at the Grant-Harvey Centre before the Fredericton Red Wings first home exhibition game, September 1, 2019

The Fredericton Red Wings name has a history in the Fredericton junior hockey scene dating back to the 1960s, with a number of Red Wings teams playing in Fredericton. The team which is the inspiration for the name of the new Junior team was in operation from 1976 until the team folded when New Brunswick Junior Hockey League ceased operations in 1983. That team captured three consecutive titles from 1976–77 to 1978–79, and was coached to the NB Junior Championship title in 1978–79 by former NHL player and Fredericton native Buster Harvey (who was with the team as coach from 1978 to 1981). Coincidentally, the Grant-Harvey Centre, where the current Junior Red Wings play their home games, is named after Buster Harvey and former NHL player and Fredericton native Danny Grant.

On May 31, 2019, Global Centre Ice announced the hiring of Brian Casey as the first head coach of the Fredericton Red Wings. Casey has extensive hockey experience, including time playing for the Saint-Jean Lynx of the Quebec Major Junior Hockey League, the Acadia Axemen, and Team Canada, with whom he won a Spengler Cup. He also played ten seasons of professional hockey in Slovakia, Austria, and Denmark before turning to coaching. He has helped coach the Grand Falls-Windsor Cataracts and St. Francis Xavier X-Men, and has been head coach of the King's Edgehill U18 Boys team for the past two years.

On June 15, 2019, Red Wings management attended their first ever MHL Entry Draft, held in Edmundston, New Brunswick. With the 4th overall pick the Wings took forward Neil MacLean of the Cape Breton West Islanders, making him the first player drafted by the team since their move to Fredericton.

On August 8, 2019, the Red Wings introduced their mascot on Facebook. An anthropomorphic phoenix named "Wingnut", his number (#19) is a reference to the Red Wings inaugural season. The choice of a phoenix is a reference both to the team name (Red Wings) and the idea that the current team has risen from the ashes of the original Red Wings team in Fredericton. The name was chosen from fan suggestions made on the various social media platforms used by the team.

The Red Wings began their inaugural season on September 12, 2019 in New Glasgow against the Pictou County Crushers, a game which they lost 3–1. Prior to their first game it was announced on Instagram that Evan White (#27) would be the first Captain of the Red Wings, with Tyler Browning (#25) and Brady Patterson (#37) as assistant Captains. The Wings first win came on September 13 in Berwick, where they beat the Valley Wildcats 5–0. Their home opener was on September 20, 2019. The Red Wings defeated the Grand Falls Rapids 5–1, with Fredericton native Jack Grant (#34) making 36 saves to earn him first star of the game.

On October 14 (Thanksgiving), former NHL player, team mentor, and co-namesake of the Grant-Harvey Centre, Danny Grant died at the age of 73. He had been one of the reasons for choosing the Red Wings nickname once again when the team moved to Fredericton. His legacy as a local boy who reach the 50 goals in a season milestone made him someone for the players to look up to. For the remainder of the 2019–20 season, the Red Wings will wear a helmet sticker featuring Grant's #21 and the Wings logo.

Two franchise records were set by the Red Wings in one game against the Miramichi Timberwolves on January 9, 2020. The Red Wings went into the third period of the game down 3–2, then exploded for 7 unanswered goals, winning the game 9–3, setting a record for their most goals in a game, as well as having two players - Declan MacEachern (#12), and Noah Cauchi (#14) - scoring hat tricks. Around the same time, leading up to the 2020 MHL trade deadline, the Red Wings traded away their first captain, Evan White, and one of their original assistant captains, Tyler Browning. As a result, Ryan O'Toole (#16) was named the Red Wings second captain in their history, with Olle Akermark (#23) becoming an assistant captain, an announcement they made on Facebook.

The Red Wings finished their inaugural season in Fredericton in 4th place in the Eastlink North Division and 6th place overall.

=== COVID-19 pandemic ===
The team were set to face the Summerside Western Capitals in the first round of the 2020 Canadian Tire Cup Playoffs, but on March 12 the MHL Board of Governors voted to suspend the start of the playoffs. The following day, the league announced that they were cancelling the 2020 playoffs to protect players and fans from the COVID-19 pandemic, thus ending the Red Wings inaugural season in Fredericton.

The 2020-21 Season was in question for many months, but with the creation of the Atlantic Bubble in July, the League tentatively announced plans for a 52-game season. However, after creating and receiving approval for their Return to Play Plan, the MHL announced that the season would be played, beginning on October 30 instead of the 2nd, and would be a shortened 44-game season. The exhibition schedule was released on September 18, and included information on how fans would be able to attend games in person, with the official schedule being released on October 22. This schedule reduced the number of games to 40 and subdivided each division into two mini-divisions. This was done to help with coronavirus concerns and to help maintain rivalries. Fredericton was placed in mini-division #1 of the Eastlink North division, along with the Edmundston Blizzard and Grand Falls Rapids. As part of this realignment, each team in the division would play 16 games in their mini-division, 12 against the other mini-division in their division, and 12 against the opposite division, although these games were not to be played until the end of January. Fredericton began their pre-season on September 27 with a 6–2 win over the Amherst Ramblers. They began the season on October 30 with a 2–1 overtime loss to the Edmundston Blizzard.

On November 26, the New Brunswick government announced they were pulling out of the Atlantic Bubble and, at the same time, they were moving Health Zone 3 (which includes Fredericton) back to the Orange Phase of COVID-19 recovery. This was done due to a surge in active cases in Fredericton and the rest of Health Zone 3. With Newfoundland and Labrador and Prince Edward Island having pulled out of the Atlantic Bubble three days earlier, the Bubble effectively ended. As a result of the return to the Orange phase for Fredericton, the Red Wings were required by the government to suspend play until the zone returned to the Yellow phase. Therefore, they announced the postponement of four games, from November 28 to December 10. Following the return to Yellow phase on December 7, they were able to play the game on December 10 as scheduled, only having to make up the other three games at a later date. On January 5, the New Brunswick government transitioned all zones back to the Orange recovery phase as 27 new cases were announced in one day (the highest total for one day in the province to that date). As such, all New Brunswick teams, including the Red Wings were forced to temporarily pause their season, until the province returned to Yellow phase.

New Brunswick's Chief Medical Officer of Health Dr. Jennifer Russell announced on March 5 (exactly two months after the season was paused) that all of the province's zones were to return to yellow phase on March 8, 2021. The Red Wings returned to play against the Campbellton Tigers on March 10, losing 5–1.

By early April, the MHL had changed the structure of the Canadian Tire Cup playoffs for the Eastlink South Division to a round-robin style first round to seed teams for the elimination rounds. The same playoff style was planned for the Eastlink North Division and, because not all teams finished their complete schedules, points percentage was used to determine each team's position going into the playoff round-robin. All teams qualified for the round-robin and would have a chance to play each other for a place in the elimination rounds.

The playoffs were derailed in both divisions by the coronavirus. In the Eastlink South (Nova Scotia and Prince Edward Island) the Government of Nova Scotia announced they were going to lock down the entire province (originally just the Halifax Region) in response to a surge in COVID-19 cases. In the Eastlink North, the Edmundston Blizzards and Grand Falls Rapids were in lockdown due to an outbreak in the Edmundston area. As such, on April 27, it was announced that the Eastlink South Division would not complete their playoffs and their season ended. The Edmundston and Grand Falls teams likewise decided to end their seasons, leaving only three teams to compete for the Eastlink North Division Title.

At the end of the season, the Fredericton Red Wings were in last place in the Eastlink North Division. Now, they would play in a three team round-robin to determine who would play for the divisional championship, beginning on April 23. Following the round-robin, the Red Wings had earned a bye to the Divisional finals. They ended up playing the Miramichi Timberwolves in a best-of-3 final, who they defeated 5–4 in overtime in game one and 3–2 in overtime in game two to capture their first Eastlink North Divisional title.

=== Fatal assault ===
Officers with Fredericton Police Force were called to respond to an assault in the Tannery area of the city’s downtown in the early morning hours of Sept. 22, 2024. The assault resulted in the death of Andre Bourgeois, 41 Three youths and Tyler Totten, a former player with the Red Wings, were charged. Totten pleaded guilty to summary assault as part of a plea deal and received a 12-month suspended sentence and 12 months of probation. The other three accused in Bourgeois’s death — two of whom were 17-years-old at the time, while the other was 16 — have chosen to be tried by judge and jury. Their identities are protected by the Youth Criminal Justice Act and they are not in custody. Twenty days have been set aside for that trial, which is set to begin on Sept. 28, 2026.

=== Relocation ===
On March 7, 2025, the MHL announced the relocation of the Fredericton Red Wings to Bathurst, New Brunswick at the end of the 2024–2025 season. The team will rebrand as the Chaleur Lightning and replace the QMJHL's Acadie-Bathurst Titan who are relocating to Newfoundland.

== Season-by-season record ==
=== Regular season ===
Legend: OTL=Overtime loss, SOL=Shootout loss

Season	Division	Games	Won	Lost	OTL	SOL	Points	Goals For	Goals Against	Standing	
Season	Division	Games	Won	Lost	OTL	SOL	Points	Goals For	Goals Against	Division	MHL
2019–20	Eastlink North	52	28	19	4	1	61	176	161	4th in North Division	6th Overall
2020–21 ǂ	Eastlink North	25	11	12	1	1	24	84	100	5th in North Division	9th Overall
2021–22 ǂ	Eastlink North	36	22	12	2	0	46	152	119	3rd in North Division	4th Overall
2022–23	Eastlink North	52	20	28	2	2	44	183	220	6th in North Division	10th Overall
2023–24 †	Eastlink North	52	22	25	2	3	49	209	218	4th in North Division	9th Overall
2024–25	Eastlink North	52	13	36	1	2	29	144	237	6th in North Division	11th Overall

=== Playoffs ===
Season	Division Semi-final	Division Final	MHL Final
2019–20	Playoffs cancelled due to the COVID-19 pandemic		
2020–21	Bye (1st in Play-in Round)	2-0 Miramichi Timberwolves††	No Finals due to COVID-19 pandemic
2021–22	4-2 Campbellton Tigers	0-4 Summerside Western Capitals	Eliminated
2022–23	Did not qualify		
2023–24	0-4 Edmundston Blizzard	Eliminated	
2024–25	Did not qualify for post season play		

ǂDue to the COVID-19 Pandemic, the standings for these two seasons were determined by points percentage.

††The first round of the playoffs was replaced by a three-team play-in tournament, with Fredericton finishing first and getting a bye to the Division Finals. The finals series was shortened to three games by the League because of the COVID-19 Pandemic

== Team captains ==
- Evan White, 2019-20 (traded during the season)
- Ryan O'Toole, 2020
- Brady Patterson, 2020–21
- Declan MacEachern, 2021–22
- Nathan Kelly, Logan Carruthers, 2022–23
- Cam Thomson, 2023–24
- Tyson Snow 2024–25
