= Truro Bearcats (1977–1983) =

- City: Truro, Nova Scotia, Canada
- League: Metro Valley Junior Hockey League
- Founded: 1967 (Kentville Riteway Rangers)
- Operated: 1967–77 (Jr. B); 1977–83 (Jr. A)
- Home arena: Colchester Legion Stadium

The Truro Bearcats were a Junior "A" Hockey team based in Truro, Nova Scotia, that played out of the Metro Valley Junior Hockey League. Originally a founding member of the league, and then known as the Kentville Riteway Rangers in 1967, the franchise later moved to Truro and became the Bearcats in 1968. The Bearcats competed until 1983 when they folded mid-season.

== History ==
=== Relocation and success ===
The Truro Bearcats were founded in 1967 as the Kentville Riteway Rangers along with the Metro Valley Junior Hockey League. At this time the league was leveled at Junior "B". The following season the Rangers were relocated to Truro and renamed the Bearcats. The move to Truro proved successful for the franchise as the Bearcats captured five MVJHL championships - three back to back from 1969–70 to 1971–72. The Bearcats would add two more championships in 1973-74 and 1975-76 respectively.

=== League promotion and folding ===
In 1977 the Metro Valley Junior Hockey League was promoted to the Junior "A" level. The Bearcats made the jump to the next level, but did not find success. Six years later in 1983 the team ceased operations mid season. The Bearcat legacy lived on, and in 1997 the Maritime Junior "A" Hockey League awarded Truro with a new franchise, thus marking the return of junior hockey to Truro after a fourteen-year absence.

== See also ==
- Truro Bearcats
- Maritime Junior Hockey League
