= Edmundston Blizzard =

Canadian Junior ice hockey team

- City: Edmundston, New Brunswick
- League: MHL
- Division: North
- Founded: 1959
- Home arena: Centre Jean Daigle
- Colours
- General manager: Steve MacPherson
- Head coach: Michael Ward
- Media: HockeyTV
- Website: blizzardedmundston.ca

Franchise history
- 1959–1961: Moncton Beavers
- 1962–1963: Riverview Jr. Canucks
- 1963–1964: Moncton Geldarts
- 1965–1966: Moncton Hawks
- 1966–1968: Moncton Seals
- 1968–1981: Moncton Beavers
- 1981–1989: Moncton Hawks
- 1989–1993: Moncton Classics
- 1993–2008: Moncton Beavers
- 2008–2017: Dieppe Commandos
- 2017–present: Edmundston Blizzard

The Edmundston Blizzard are a junior ice hockey team from Edmundston, New Brunswick, Canada. They play in the Maritime Junior Hockey League (MHL).

== History ==
Moncton Beavers and also as Richview Junior Canucks and Moncton Hawks were members in the now defunct Nova Scotia Senior Hockey League (1958-1965) from 1961 to 1965.

The Moncton Hawks were New Brunswick Junior Hockey League Junior A champions in 1981, 1982, and 1983.

In 1983, the Moncton Hawks abandoned the faltering New Brunswick Junior Hockey League and joined the Metro Valley Junior Hockey League which until then was a Nova Scotia-based league.

In the summer of 2008, the Moncton Beavers moved to neighbouring Dieppe and became the Commandos. The Commandos played host to the 2009 Fred Page Cup. The Commandos lost their first game after moving to Dieppe on September 13, 2008 2-1 to the Yarmouth Mariners.

Former Dieppe Commandos logo

On November 2, 2016 it was announced that Dieppe could not support a Jr. A team and that the franchise would be relocating to the city of Edmundston, New Brunswick for the start of the 2017-18 season. On February 8, 2017 it was announced that they would become the Edmundston Blizzard, beginning at season end.

In their first season in Edmundston, the Blizzard won the divisional season championship, finished first overall and won the league playoffs.

In November 2024, the Edmundston Blizzard reached to the top of the CJHL Top 20 list, becoming the first MHL team to do so since 2011–12. The Blizzard went on to win the league championship Metalfab Cup and advanced to the national championship tournament in Calgary.

Statistics
Season	GP	W	L	T	OTL	GF	GA	P	Results	Playoffs
Moncton Beavers
1968-69	40	13	20	7	-	147	199	33	3rd MJAHL	Lost semi-final
1969-70	30	15	12	3	-	156	166	33	2nd NBJHL	Lost final
1970-71	30	14	14	2	-	134	124	30	3rd NBJHL	Won League
1971-72	40	26	9	5	-	252	166	57	1st NBJHL	Won League
1972-73	37	28	4	5	-	262	131	61	1st NBJHL	Won League
1973-74	21	19	2	0	-	132	43	38	1st NBJHL	Won League
1974-75	30	23	7	0	-	216	120	46	1st NBJHL	
1975-76	23	13	10	0	-	116	115	26	2nd NBJHL	
1976-77	29	14	14	1	-	131	144	31	3rd NBJHL	
1977-78	38	21	15	2	-	207	185	44	2nd NBJHL	
1978-79	30	15	15	0	-	157	155	30	2nd NBJHL	
1979-80	36	23	12	1	-	223	193	47	1st NBJHL	Won League
1980-81	29	17	10	2	-	214	182	36	2nd NBJHL	Won League
Moncton Hawks
1981-82	22	13	8	1	-	201	162	33	1st NBJHL	Won League
1982-83	27	22	5	0	-	213	99	44	1st NBJHL	Won League
1983-84	40	18	19	3	-	240	229	39	4th MVJHL	
1984-85	40	17	19	4	-	204	204	38	3rd MVJHL	
1985-86	40	24	13	3	-	221	179	51	2nd MVJHL	
1986-87	40	27	10	3	-	245	160	57	2nd MVJHL	
1987-88	40	13	19	8	-	190	214	34	4th MVJHL	
1988-89	39	27	8	4	-	287	184	58	1st MVJHL	Won League
Moncton Classics
1989-90	38	6	29	3	-	152	270	15	5th MVJHL	
1990-91	40	11	24	5	-	128	181	27	5th MVJHL	
1991-92	47	22	17	8	-	230	198	52	4th MJAHL	
1992-93	48	22	24	2	0	290	279	46	6th MJAHL	
Moncton Beavers
1993-94	47	21	21	5	0	213	223	47	3rd MJAHL	
1994-95	48	32	13	3	0	247	207	67	1st MJAHL	Won League
1995-96	53	34	17	0	3	209	198	71	1st MJAHL	
1996-97	56	24	25	1	6	279	262	55	5th MJAHL	
1997-98	52	29	10	2	1	242	240	61	3rd MJAHL	
1998-99	48	24	19	5	-	217	194	55	5th MJAHL	
1999-00	52	18	30	2	2	183	231	40	7th MJAHL	
2000-01	52	19	29	2	2	202	255	42	8th MJAHL	
2001-02	52	25	23	3	1	207	216	54	6th MJAHL	
2002-03	52	22	27	1	2	185	217	47	8th MJAHL	
2003-04	52	25	19	7	1	192	184	58	4th MJAHL	
2004-05	56	21	25	6	4	183	210	52	10th MJAHL	
2005-06	56	27	24	0	5	176	208	60	9th MJAHL	Lost Division SF
2006-07	58	37	17	0	4	198	143	78	4th MJAHL	Lost Division Final
2007-08	58	30	22	-	6	213	208	66	6th MJAHL	Lost quarter-final
Dieppe Commandos
2008-09	54	34	17	-	3	180	143	71	5th MJAHL	Lost quarter-final
2009-10	50	15	29	-	6	123	195	36	10th MJAHL	Lost quarter-final
2010-11	52	9	41	-	2	120	254	20	11th MHL	DNQ
2011-12	52	22	26	-	4	167	220	48	8th MHL	Lost quarter-final
2012-13	52	27	20	-	5	212	201	59	7th MHL	Lost quarter-final
2013-14	52	28	17	-	7	200	179	63	6th MHL	Lost League Final
2014-15	48	36	10	-	2	232	134	74	1st MHL	Won League; 2nd Fred Page Cup
2015-16	48	33	14	1	0	207	160	67	3rd of 6 North; 3rd of 12 MHL	Won Div. Semifinal 4-3 (Slammers); Won Div. Finals, 4-2 (Western Capitals); Lost League Finals 2-4 (Crushers)
2016-17	50	27	16	4	3	187	159	61	2nd of 6 North; 6th of 12 MHL	Lost div. semi-final 2-4 (Western Capitals)
Edmundston Blizzard
2017–18	50	36	10	0	4	180	137	76	1st in division 1st overall	Won quarterfinal against Miramichi (4:0); Won semifinal against Summerside (4:3); Won final against Yarmouth (4:2)
2018–19	50	26	17	6	1	189	162	59	3rd in division 5th overall	Lost quarterfinal against Campbellton (4:1)
2019–20	52	34	9	0	9	227	170	77	2nd in division 2nd overall	Cancelled
2020–21	19	10	7	0	2	69	66	22	2nd in division 6th overall	Cancelled
2021–22	37	21	11	0	5	152	119	47	4th in division 5th overall	Lost quarterfinal against Summerside (4:1)
2022–23	52	38	13	0	1	242	165	77	1st in division 2nd overall	Won quarterfinal against Miramichi (4:2); Won semifinal against Summerside (4:0); Lost final against Yarmouth (4:0)
2023–24	52	39	12	1	0	229	136	79	1st in division 2nd overall	Won quarterfinal against Fredericton (4:0); Lost semifinal against Miramichi (4:0)
2024–25	52	44	6	1	1	238	126	90	1st in division 1st overall	Won quarterfinal against Miramichi (4:1); Won semifinal against Campbellton (4:0); Won final against Pictou County (4:0)
2025–26	52	30	16	0	3	224	168	66	3rd in division 6th overall	Won quarterfinal against West Kent (4:0); Won semifinal against Chaleur (4:2)

Source: "Edmundston Blizzard statistics and history". hockeydb.com.

== Fred Page Cup ==
Eastern Canada Championships
MHL - QAAAJHL - CCHL - Host

Year	Round Robin	Record	Standing	Semifinal	Gold Medal Game
1995	2OTL, Cornwall Colts 2-3; L, Joliette Nationals 4-5; L, Valleyfield Braves	0-3	4th of 4	Did not qualify	
2015	L, Carleton Place Canadians 1-3; W, Cornwall Colts 4-1; W, Longueuil Collège Français 6-3	2-0-1-0	2nd of 4	W, Longueuil Collège Français 3-2	L, Carleton Place Canadians 2-3
2018	L, Ottawa Jr. Senators 1-4; L, Longueuil Collège Français 3-6; W, Carleton Place Canadians 3-2	1-0-2-0	3rd of 4	L, Longueuil Collège Français 1-5	Did not qualify

== Centennial Cup ==
Year	Round-robin	Record	Standing	Quarterfinal	Semifinal	Championship
2025	OTW, Rockland Nationals (CCHL), 3-2; L, Melfort Mustangs (SJHL), 3-5; W, Valleyfield Braves (QJHL), 7-2; L, Calgary Canucks (Host), 2-8	1-1-2-0	4th of 5 Pool B	Did not qualify	Did not qualify	Did not qualify

== Notable alumni ==
- Ryan Clowe
- Sidney Veysey
- Don Wheldon
- Patrice Cormier

== See also ==
- List of ice hockey teams in New Brunswick
