= Summerside Western Capitals =

Junior ice hockey franchise

- City: Summerside, Prince Edward Island
- League: MHL
- Division: South
- Founded: 1993
- Home arena: Credit Union Place
- Colours: Dark blue Cardinal red
- General manager: Pat McIver
- Head coach: Billy McGuigan
- Website: gocapsgo.ca

Franchise history
- 1976–1977: Summerside Crystals
- 1984–1990: Summerside Western Capitals
- 1993–2000: Summerside Capitals
- 2000–present: Summerside Western Capitals

The Summerside Western Capitals are a junior ice hockey franchise of the Maritime Junior Hockey League (MHL) based in Summerside, Prince Edward Island. The club plays its home games at the Credit Union Place in Summerside.

== History ==
=== Island Junior Hockey League (1973–1991) ===
The Hemphill Pontiac Western Capitals began in the Island Junior Hockey League. Summerside is in the Western end of the province, & sometimes referred to as 'The Western Capital', thus the reference to 'western' in the original team name. They hosted the 1989 Centennial Cup on behalf of the IJHL. This team was coached by former NHL coach, General Manager, & Team President of the Columbus Blue Jackets, Doug MacLean, a Summerside native.

| Season | GP | W | L | T | OTL | GF | GA | P | Results | Playoffs |
|---|---|---|---|---|---|---|---|---|---|---|
| 1973-74 | 28 | 10 | 15 | 3 | - | 123 | 154 | 23 | 4th IJHL | |
| 1974-75 | 40 | 21 | 18 | 1 | - | 208 | 198 | 43 | 3rd IJHL | |
| 1975-76 | 39 | 13 | 19 | 7 | - | 199 | 247 | 33 | 4th IJHL | |
| 1976-77 | 40 | 12 | 25 | 3 | - | 186 | 276 | 27 | 5th IJHL | |
| 1977-78 | 40 | 31 | 5 | 4 | - | -- | -- | 66 | 1st IJHL | |
| 1978-79 | 39 | 20 | 14 | 5 | - | 206 | 181 | 45 | 3rd IJHL | |
| 1979-80 | 40 | 14 | 20 | 6 | - | 193 | 235 | 34 | 4th IJHL | |
| 1980-81 | Did not participate | | | | | | | | | |
| 1981-82 | 42 | 8 | 38 | 6 | - | 189 | 283 | 22 | 4th IJHL | |
| 1982-83 | 42 | 18 | 18 | 6 | - | 216 | 238 | 42 | 3rd IJHL | |
| 1983-84 | 40 | 25 | 12 | 3 | - | 244 | 201 | 53 | 1st IJHL | Won league |
| 1984-85 | 37 | 18 | 15 | 4 | - | 203 | 174 | 40 | 2nd IJHL | |
| 1985-86 | 36 | 15 | 9 | 12 | - | 231 | 204 | 42 | 2nd IJHL | Won league |
| 1986-87 | 42 | 19 | 20 | 3 | - | 232 | 216 | 41 | 3rd IJHL | |
| 1987-88 | 42 | 30 | 6 | 6 | - | 267 | 179 | 66 | 1st IJHL | |
| 1988-89 | 44 | 33 | 7 | 4 | - | 297 | 161 | 78 | 1st IJHL | |
| 1989-90 | 40 | 26 | 11 | 2 | 1 | 213 | 153 | 55 | 2nd IJHL | |
| 1990-91 | 42 | 15 | 20 | 5 | 2 | 211 | 247 | 37 | 3rd IJHL | |

Source: "Summerside Western Capitals hockey team [IJHL] statistics and history". hockeydb.com.

=== Maritime Junior Hockey League (1991–present) ===
The Capitals joined the Maritime Junior A Hockey League (MJAHL) in 1991. The league was renamed the Maritime Junior Hockey League (MHL) in 2010.

The 1996–97 Western Capitals won the league championship Callaghan Cup and went on to win the national championship 1997 Royal Bank Cup, becoming the first team from east of Ontario to do so. The team was inducted into the PEI Sports Hall of Fame in 2002, and into the Maritime Sport Hall of Fame in 2022.

In March 2007, the Western Capitals moved from their former home at Cahill Stadium to a new 3,250 seat arena at the Summerside Wellness Centre. The venue was subsequently renamed Credit Union Place.

Former logo of the team used from 2007–2013.

In the 2008–09 season, the Capitals finished first place in the Meek division, and later went on to defeat the Dieppe Commandos, and Miramichi Timberwolves in 4 game sweeps to advance to the league championship series, to take on the Truro Bearcats for the second time in 3 years. This time though, the Capitals defeated Truro in 5 games, and won their first league championship since 1997. The Capitals entered the Fred Page Cup tournament, and after going 2–1 in the round robin portion, they defeated the Pembroke Lumber Kings 4–1 in the semifinal to move to the final against the Dieppe Commandos. The Caps won the game 3–2 in double overtime to advance to the national championship 2009 Royal Bank Cup tournament in Victoria, British Columbia. The Capitals travelled to the Pacific coast to Victoria, BC to participate in their 2nd tournament. Summerside had a 0–4 record heading into their final game against the defending RBC champions Humboldt Broncos. Summerside won the game 5–0, but were already eliminated from the tournament and finished 5th. The players were angry and upset about the outcome and engaged in roughing up one of the hotel employees at the team's hotel. Their behaviour resulted in the Capitals losing the right to host the 2011 Royal Bank Cup. Summerside got their chance to host the tournament in 2013.

In 2010, the Maritime Junior A Hockey League (MJAHL) was renamed the Maritime Junior Hockey League (MHL).

From 2001 to 2013, the Capitals were owned by a private ownership group consisting of local individuals. In 2013, the Caps were sold to a new private local group.

Head Coach, Billy McGuigan, was named winner of the Darcy Haugan/Mark Cross Memorial Award as CJHL Coach of the Year in 2019–20.

Season-by-season record
| Season | GP | W | L | T | OTL | GF | GA | Pts | Regular season | Postseason |
|---|---|---|---|---|---|---|---|---|---|---|
| 1991–92 | 46 | 18 | 16 | 12 | 0 | 210 | 206 | 48 | 6th overall | |
| 1992–93 | 48 | 21 | 21 | 4 | 2 | 226 | 244 | 48 | 5th overall | |
| 1993–94 | 48 | 13 | 32 | 2 | 1 | 182 | 263 | 29 | 7th overall | |
| 1994–95 | 48 | 24 | 21 | 3 | 0 | 221 | 206 | 51 | 3rd overall | |
| 1995–96 | 54 | 28 | 24 | 1 | 1 | 252 | 232 | 58 | 5th overall | |
| 1996–97 | 55 | 35 | 14 | 4 | 2 | 350 | 259 | 76 | 2nd overall | Won final against Dartmouth; Won national championship against South Surrey Eagles (4:3) |
| 1997–98 | 52 | 12 | 33 | 3 | 4 | 207 | 307 | 31 | 9th overall | |
| 1998–99 | 48 | 5 | 41 | 2 | 0 | 157 | 317 | 15 | 9th overall | |
| 1999–00 | 52 | 24 | 24 | 3 | 1 | 198 | 229 | 52 | 5th overall | |
| 2000–01 | 52 | 32 | 12 | 4 | 4 | 288 | 224 | 72 | 1st overall | Lost final |
| 2001–02 | 52 | 21 | 26 | 3 | 2 | 209 | 225 | 47 | 8th overall | |
| 2002–03 | 52 | 26 | 21 | 3 | 2 | 240 | 219 | 57 | 4th overall | |
| 2003–04 | 52 | 19 | 28 | 2 | 3 | 201 | 225 | 43 | 9th overall | |
| 2004–05 | 56 | 22 | 26 | 4 | 4 | 220 | 252 | 52 | 9th overall | |
| 2005–06 | 56 | 36 | 14 | 0 | 6 | 274 | 197 | 79 | 2nd overall | Lost semifinal |
| 2006–07 | 58 | 43 | 14 | 0 | 1 | 281 | 172 | 87 | 2nd overall | Lost final against Truro (4:2) |
| 2007–08 | 58 | 24 | 30 | 0 | 4 | 185 | 219 | 52 | 9th overall | Lost mini-series |
| 2008–09 | 54 | 39 | 13 | 0 | 2 | 249 | 149 | 80 | 1st overall | Won final against Truro (4:1); Won Fred Page Cup against Dieppe |
| 2009–10 | 50 | 27 | 20 | 0 | 3 | 230 | 186 | 57 | 4th overall | Lost semifinal |
| 2010–11 | 52 | 36 | 12 | 0 | 4 | 255 | 186 | 76 | 2nd overall | Won final against Pictou County (4:0) |
| 2011–12 | 52 | 26 | 21 | 0 | 5 | 192 | 200 | 57 | 2nd in division 7th overall | Lost semifinal |
| 2012–13 | 52 | 43 | 7 | 0 | 2 | 222 | 119 | 88 | 1st overall | Won quarterfinal against Miramichi (4:0); Won semifinal against Woodstock (4:0); Won final against Truro (4:1) |
| 2013–14 | 52 | 24 | 23 | 0 | 5 | 178 | 187 | 53 | 4th in division 8th overall | Lost quarterfinal against Miramichi (4:1) |
| 2014–15 | 48 | 21 | 21 | 0 | 6 | 184 | 197 | 48 | 8th overall | Did not qualify |
| 2015–16 | 48 | 34 | 12 | 1 | 1 | 207 | 150 | 70 | 1st in division 1st overall | Won quarterfinal against Campbellton (4:3); Lost semifinal against Dieppe (4:2) |
| 2016–17 | 50 | 25 | 22 | 0 | 3 | 169 | 184 | 53 | 3rd in division 4th overall | Won quarterfinal against Dieppe (4:2); Lost semifinal against Miramichi (4:0) |
| 2017–18 | 50 | 33 | 16 | 1 | 0 | 180 | 137 | 67 | 2nd in division 3rd overall | Won quarterfinal against Campbellton (4:1); Lost semifinal against Edmundston (4:3) |
| 2018–19 | 50 | 40 | 8 | 1 | 1 | 247 | 120 | 82 | 1st in division 1st overall | Won quarterfinal against Fredericton (4:0); Lost semifinal against Campbellton (4:3) |
| 2019–20 | 52 | 42 | 7 | 1 | 2 | 257 | 145 | 88 | 1st in division 1st overall | Playoffs cancelled |
| 2020–21 | 23 | 14 | 7 | 2 | 0 | 94 | 73 | 30 | 4th in division 4th overall | Playoffs cancelled |
| 2021–22 | 38 | 31 | 5 | 1 | 2 | 206 | 101 | 65 | 1st in division 1st overall | Won quarterfinal against Edmundston (4:1); Won semifinal against Fredericton (4:0); Won final against Truro (4:1) |
| 2022–23 | 52 | 35 | 14 | 3 | 0 | 217 | 167 | 73 | 2nd in division 3rd overall | Won quarterfinal against Campbellton (4:3); Lost semifinal against Edmundston (4:0) |
| 2023–24 | 52 | 38 | 5 | 3 | 6 | 274 | 170 | 85 | 1st in division 1st overall | Won quarterfinal against Yarmouth (4:1); Won semifinal against Amherst (4:2); Lost final against Miramichi (4:2) |
| 2024–25 | 52 | 38 | 10 | 0 | 2 | 257 | 163 | 80 | 1st in division 2nd overall | Lost quarterfinal against Weeks (4:1) |
| 2025–26 | 52 | 32 | 12 | 0 | 8 | 232 | 170 | 72 | 1st in division 1st overall | Won quarterfinal against Amherst (4:3) |

"Summerside Capitals hockey team statistics and history (1993–2000)". hockeydb.com.
"Summerside Western Capitals hockey team [MHL] statistics and history (2000–2026)". hockeydb.com.

== National championships ==
The Summerside Western Capitals' first appearance at a national championship tournament was as the host and runner-up of the 1989 Centennial Cup. The Capitals lost to the Thunder Bay Flyers of the USHL in the championship match.

The 1996–97 Capitals won the 1997 Royal Bank Cup after defeating the South Surrey Eagles of the British Columbia Hockey League in the final. In doing so, they became the first championship team from east of Ontario.

After winning the MHL league championship and regional championship Fred Page Cup, the 2008–09 Capitals advanced to the 2009 Royal Bank Cup in Victoria, British Columbia. They were eliminated from competition after losing three out of four matches in the preliminary round-robin.

As the hosts of the 2013 Royal Bank Cup, the 2012–13 MHL championship Capitals finished second overall after losing to the Brooks Bandits of the AJHL.

The 2022 MHL championship Capitals were eliminated from the 2022 Centennial Cup after losing to Collège Français de Longueuil in the Quebec Junior Hockey League in the quarterfinal.

| Year | Round-robin | Record | Standing | Quarterfinal | Semifinal | Championship |
|---|---|---|---|---|---|---|
| 2022 | W, Soo Thunderbirds (NOJHL), 4:1; L, Dauphin Kings (ManJHL), 7:1; W, Flin Flon Bombers (SJHL), 4:1; OTW, Ottawa Jr. Senators (CCHL), 4-3 | 2-1-1-0 | 2nd of 5 Pool B | Lost against Longueuil Collège Français (4:3) | Did not qualify | Did not qualify |

The 2025–26 Capitals were selected to host the 2026 Centennial Cup.

== Franchise records ==
These are franchise records held by previous team rosters.

Team records for a single season
| Statistic | Total | Season |
|---|---|---|
| Most Points | 88 | 2012–13 |
| Most Wins | 43 | 2012–13 |
| Most Goals For | 350 | 1996–97 |
| Fewest Goals For | 123 | 1973–74 |
| Fewest Goals Against | 82 | 1971–72 |
| Most Goals Against | 317 | 1998–99 |

== Notable alumni ==
=== Summerside Crystals ===
- Gerard Gallant (1979–80)

=== Summerside Western Capitals ===
- Darryl Boyce (2000–01)
- Josh Currie (2008–09)
- Brett Gallant (2005–06, 2008–09)
- Ross Johnston (2010–11, 2011–12)
- Darren Langdon (1991–92)
- Nathan McIver (2001–02)
- Kent Paynter (1981–82)
- Jordan Spence (2017–18)
- Geoff Walker (2003–04)
