= Mariners Centre =

Multi-purpose arena and recreation complex in Yarmouth, Nova Scotia, Canada

- The Fish Tank
- Interactive map of Mariners Centre
- Address: 45 Jody Shelley Drive; Yarmouth, Nova Scotia; Canada
- Coordinates: 43°50′15″N 66°5′57″W
- Owner: Town of Yarmouth (co-owner); Municipality of the District of Yarmouth (co-owner); Municipality of Argyle (co-owner)
- Capacity: 1,750

Construction
- Opened: November 28, 2001

Tenant
- Yarmouth Mariners (MHL) (2002–present)

Website
- marinerscentre.com

The Mariners Centre is a multi-purpose, double-ice-surface arena and recreation complex in Yarmouth, Nova Scotia, Canada. It serves as the home arena for the Yarmouth Mariners of the Maritime Junior Hockey League (MHL) and functions as the main hub for sporting events, concerts, trade shows, and community gatherings in southwestern Nova Scotia.

The complex includes two NHL-sized ice rinks, a walking track, fitness and aquatic facilities, and multiple event spaces. The Mariners Centre also operates Mariners on Main, a second recreation facility located in downtown Yarmouth.

== History ==
Plans for a regional sports and entertainment facility in Yarmouth were initiated in the late 1990s by a partnership among the Town of Yarmouth, the Municipality of the District of Yarmouth, and the Municipality of Argyle. The goal was to provide a modern facility for ice sports and community events in southwestern Nova Scotia.

Construction of the Mariners Centre began in 2000, and the arena officially opened on November 28, 2001, with an inaugural hockey game and community celebration.

Since its opening, the Mariners Centre has hosted a wide variety of local, provincial, and national events. It became home to the Yarmouth Mariners in 2002, shortly after the team relocated from Amherst.

== Facilities ==
The Mariners Centre complex features:

- Two NHL-sized ice surfaces (the Graves Arena and the Pleasant Supplies Arena)
- Seating for up to 1,750 spectators
- Dressing rooms, officials’ rooms, and training areas
- A walking track overlooking the main arena
- A community meeting room, hospitality suites, and skyboxes
- Concession stands and a box office
- On-site parking for more than 300 vehicles

In addition to the main arena, the Mariners Centre includes the Mariners on Main facility at 275 Main Street, Yarmouth. Mariners on Main features:

- A 25-metre, six-lane swimming pool
- Therapeutic pool and sauna
- Fully equipped fitness centre
- Racquetball and basketball courts
- Multi-purpose studios and rental spaces
- Locker rooms and universal changerooms

The combination of the two locations makes the Mariners Centre one of the largest and most comprehensive recreation complexes in western Nova Scotia.

== Events ==
The Mariners Centre has hosted several major hockey tournaments and events, including:

- The Fred Page Cup (2005)
- The New York Islanders training camp (2005 and 2006)
- The World Junior A Challenge (2012 and 2013)
- The MHL Showcase and playoff championships
- Provincial figure skating championships and ringette tournaments

In addition to sporting events, the facility hosts concerts, trade shows, charity fundraisers, graduation ceremonies, and large-scale community events such as home shows and craft fairs.

== Expansion ==
In 2023, the Mariners Centre announced a major expansion valued at approximately CA$40 million. The project aims to transform the facility into a regional recreation hub serving all of southwestern Nova Scotia.

The expansion will include:

- A modern aquatics centre with a competition-sized pool
- A fitness and wellness centre
- An indoor walking track
- Multi-purpose community rooms
- Upgraded accessibility with universal changerooms

The new expansion will be a separate stand-alone structure connected by a shared plaza, rather than an addition to the existing arena. Construction is expected to begin in summer 2024 and finish by fall 2026.

Public consultations held in 2023–2024 involved over 20 engagement sessions to ensure the expansion reflects community needs.

== Ownership and management ==
The Mariners Centre is jointly owned and operated by three municipal partners:

- The Town of Yarmouth
- The Municipality of the District of Yarmouth
- The Municipality of Argyle

Governance is overseen by a Board of Directors, which manages operations, long-term planning, and financial oversight.

Day-to-day operations are managed by the Mariners Centre management team, which oversees programming, maintenance, and community events.

== Community impact ==
The Mariners Centre serves as a regional hub for recreation and community engagement. It provides year-round opportunities for youth sports, fitness, and cultural events. Programs include public skating, swimming lessons, seniors’ fitness, and after-school activities.

The facility’s slogan, “Where Yarmouth Comes to Play, Connect, and Entertain,” reflects its goal of fostering wellness and social connection in the community.

== Accessibility ==
The Mariners Centre offers accessible seating, elevators, automatic doors, and barrier-free parking. The new expansion will add universal changerooms and inclusive design standards to better serve individuals and families of all abilities.

== Architecture and design ==
The original 2001 structure was designed with modern arena standards, featuring high ceilings, clear sightlines, and modular space that can accommodate both ice and dry-floor events. The exterior design incorporates metal cladding and glass façades reflecting a contemporary maritime aesthetic.

The upcoming expansion, designed by architectural firm Abbott Brown Architects, emphasizes sustainability, accessibility, and community use. It will feature energy-efficient systems and multi-use spaces adaptable for different programs and events.

== See also ==
- Yarmouth Mariners
- Maritime Junior Hockey League
- World Junior A Challenge
- Yarmouth, Nova Scotia
- List of indoor arenas in Canada
