= Memorial Civic Center =

Facility in Campbellton, New Brunswick

Coordinates: 48°00′38″N 66°40′10″W

- Interactive map of Memorial Civic Center
- Location: 44 Salmon Boulevard; Campbellton, New Brunswick; E3N 3G1
- Owner: City Of Campbellton
- Capacity: Hockey: 3,500; Swimming: 750; Lounge: 250; Convention Center: 400
- Surface: 2 Olympic Sized Artificial Ice Surfaces

Construction
- Built: 1991
- Opened: 1992
- Expanded: 2002
- Architect: Soucy Ellis Architects Ltd.

Tenant
- Campbellton Tigers (MHL) (1996–Present)

The Memorial Civic Center is a multi-sport recreation and conference facility in Campbellton, New Brunswick. The Memorial Civic Centre opened in downtown Campbellton on the bank of the Restigouche River in 1992. It was built to replace the Memorial Gardens which was destroyed by a fire in 1990. The Memorial Gardens was located on Arran St.

The complex is equipped to accommodate sporting events, entertainment, commercial functions and trade shows on a local, regional, provincial or national basis. The Memorial Civic Center is designed to host Olympic competitions, provide training facilities for Canada's national teams and promote recreational and sporting opportunities for all age groups.

It is home to the Campbellton Tigers hockey team.

== Facilities ==
- a 3,500-seat multi-purpose arena, containing an Olympic size ice surface
- another Olympic-size ice surface for practice
- a removable indoor soccer turf
- a 25-metre, 8-lane, semi-Olympic swimming pool
- a wading pool
- a 114-foot-long (35 m) water slide
- 250-seat lounge overlooking the main arena and an outdoor rooftop patio
- 400-seat conference room for conventions and receptions
- several meeting rooms, 2 multi-purpose rooms, 8 changing rooms
- weight training, aerobics and fitness centre
- racquet ball and squash courts
- 2 canteens
