= Grand Falls Rapids =

Junior ice hockey club

- City: Grand Falls, New Brunswick
- League: MHL
- Division: EastLink North
- Founded: 2003
- Home arena: E. & P. Sénéchal Centre
- Colours: Green; Black
- Owners: Community owners group
- General manager: Mathieu Martin
- Head coach: Jeff Cowan
- Website: rapidshockey.ca

Franchise history
- 2003–2018: Woodstock Slammers
- Since 2018: Grand Falls Rapids

The Grand Falls Rapids (French: les Rapides de Grand-Sault) are a junior ice hockey club and franchise of the Maritime Junior Hockey League (MHL). The team plays its home games at the E. & P. Sénéchal Center in Grand Falls, New Brunswick.

== History ==
In 2018, the MHL franchise then known as the Woodstock Slammers relocated to Grand Falls, New Brunswick, under new ownership, and rebranded as the Grand Falls Rapids (French: les Rapides de Grand-Sault).

Statistics
Season	GP	W	L	OTL	SOL	GF	GA	Pts	Regular season	Post-season
2018–19	50	13	30	5	2	153	239	33	6th in division 11th overall	Did not qualify
2019–20	52	16	30	3	3	156	225	38	5th in division 10th overall	Did not qualify
2020–21	23	12	5	2	4	99	86	30	Cancelled	
2021–22	39	14	23	1	1	119	170	30	5th in division 10th overall	Did not qualify
2022–23	52	21	29	1	1	178	220	44	5th in division 9th overall	Did not qualify
2023–24	52	15	33	1	3	115	240	34	6th in division 11th overall	Did not qualify
2024–25	52	16	27	2	7	157	200	41	5th in division 10th overall	Did not qualify
2025–26	52	31	15	5	1	206	181	68	1st in division 4th overall	Lost quarterfinal against Chaleur (4:1)

Source: "Grand Falls Rapids statistics and history". hockeydb.com.

== See also ==
- List of ice hockey teams in New Brunswick
- Canadian Junior Hockey League

== Sources ==
- "Grand Falls team unveils nickname, logo". Maritime Junior Hockey League. Archived from the original on 12 June 2018.
- "Grand Falls unveil new jersey and logo ahead of the MHL Entry Draft". themhl.ca. Maritime Junior Hockey League. 14 June 2025.
- "Grand Falls names Jeff Cowan as new Head Coach". themhl.ca. Maritime Junior Hockey League. 3 June 2026.
