= West Kent Steamers =

- City: Bouctouche, New Brunswick
- League: Maritime Junior Hockey League
- Division: North
- Founded: 2004
- Home arena: J.K. Iriving Centre
- Colours: Navy blue Lust red Cobalt yellow
- General manager: Olivier Filion
- Head coach: Olivier Filion
- Media: FloHockey
- Website: westkentsteamers.com

Franchise history
- 2004–2008: Halifax Wolverines
- 2008–2014: Bridgewater Lumberjacks
- 2014–2023: South Shore Lumberjacks
- 2023–present: West Kent Steamers

The West Kent Steamers are a junior ice hockey franchise of the Maritime Hockey League based in Bouctouche, New Brunswick. The team plays their home games at the 1,100 seat J.K. Irving Regional Centre.

== History ==
In April 2008, the owners of the Halifax Wolverines announced their plans to move to Bridgewater, Nova Scotia. Following a contest to come up with a name for the new team, the franchise was dubbed the "Bridgewater Lumberjacks." However, by 2014 the Lumberjacks were struggling, and in serious jeopardy of being dissolved or relocated. In November 2014, the league temporarily took over the management of the franchise until a new owner was found. The club was renamed the "South Shore Jr. A Lumberjacks" in an effort to expand the fan base of the team to nearby communities. In 2023, the club relocated to Bouctouche, New Brunswick and rebranded as the West Kent Steamers.

=== Season-by-season record ===
Halifax Wolverines
Season	GP	W	L	T	OTL	GF	GA	P	Results	Playoffs
2004-05	56	14	38	2	2	148	254	32	12th MJAHL	DNQ
2005-06	56	16	34	0	6	192	255	38	11th MJAHL	DNQ
2006-07	58	34	19	0	5	247	210	73	6th MJAHL	Lost div. final
2007-08	58	18	33	-	7	166	242	43	10th MJAHL	
Bridgewater Lumberjacks
2008-09	53	18	26	-	9	164	202	45	9th MJAHL	Lost div. miniseries
2009-10	50	21	23	-	6	179	213	48	7th MJAHL	Lost div. semifinals
2010-11	52	24	26	-	2	219	237	50	8th MHL	Lost div. semifinals
2011-12	52	15	36	-	1	166	258	31	10th MHL	DNQ
2012-13	52	10	39	-	0	144	255	23	9th MHL	Lost div. miniseries
2013-14	52	5	40	-	7	123	269	17	11th MHL	DNQ
South Shore Lumberjacks
2014-15	48	16	29	-	3	144	169	35	10th MHL	DNQ
2015-16	48	24	21	2	1	138	142	51	4th of 6 South; 9th of 12 MHL	Won div. semifinals 4-3 (Bearcats); Lost div. finals 1-4 (Crushers)
2016-17	50	17	30	1	2	171	122	37	5th of 6 South; 10th of 12 MHL	DNQ
2017-18	50	31	15	2	2	193	132	66	2nd of 6 South; 4th of 12 MHL	Won div. semifinals 4-3 (Ramblers); Lost div. finals 1-4 (Jr. Mariners)
2018-19	50	27	20	3	0	211	200	57	3rd of 6 South; 6th of 12 MHL	Won div. semifinals 4-3 (Ramblers); Lost div. finals 2-4 (Jr. Mariners)
2019-20	52	26	22	3	1	211	200	56	5th of 6 South; 9th of 12 MHL	DNQ
2020-21	34	6	26	0	2	79	142	14	7th of 7 South; 12th of 12 MHL	DNQ
2021-22	39	7	28	2	2	79	142	18	6th of 6 South; 12th of 12 MHL	DNQ
2022-23	52	10	39	2	1	130	250	23	6th of 6 South; 12th of 12 MHL	DNQ
West Kent Steamers
2023-24	52	34	16	2	0	187	151	70	2nd of 6 North; 3rd of 12 MHL	Lost div. semifinals 1-4 (Miramichi Timberwolves)
2024-25	52	30	16	4	1	205	181	66	2nd of 6 North; 4th of 12 MHL	Lost div. semifinals 2-4 (Campbellton Tigers)

=== Franchise records ===
Team records for a single season
Statistic	Total	Season
Most Points	73	2006-07
Most Wins	34	2006-07
Most Goals For	247	2006-07
Fewest Goals For	123	2013-14
Fewest Goals Against	202	2008-09
Most Goals Against	269	2013-14

=== Notable alumni ===
Rhyah Stewart, goaltender, played 10 games for the Steamers during the 2024–25 MHL season, with a .903 save percentage and 3.17 goals against average. She was the first woman player in franchise history, and the second woman player in MHL history.

== See also ==
- List of ice hockey teams in Nova Scotia

== Sources ==
- "West Kent Steamers unveil team logo". themhl.ca. 2 June 2023.
