= Miramichi Timberwolves =

- City: Miramichi, New Brunswick
- League: MHL
- Division: Eastlink North
- Founded: 2000
- Home arena: Miramichi Civic Centre
- Colours: Black and white
- General manager: Justin Blackmore
- Head coach: Shawn Evans
- Website: miramichitimberwolves.ca

Former Timberwolves logo.

The Miramichi Timberwolves are a junior ice hockey club and franchise of the Maritime Junior Hockey League (MHL). The team plays its home games at the Miramichi Civic Centre in Miramichi, New Brunswick.

== History ==
The Miramichi Timberwolves joined the Maritime Junior A Hockey League in 2000 and did not enjoy regular season success for three seasons. After the third season they acquired former NHL right wing Bill Riley as head coach, and the team reached third overall in the league and headed to their first post season.

The first playoff series ever for the Timberwolves was against the Charlottetown Abbies. The "T-wolves", (as they are known to fans) swept the Abbies four games to none. The Timberwolves progressed to the division finals but lost to the Campbellton Tigers in six games.

The Timberwolves have never won a Maritime Junior A Championship. They have reached the league final once and the division finals three times. Playoff disappointments have pushed the Timberwolves to do better in the regular season where in 2007–08 they put together their best to date. Finishing with 42 wins and 87 points good for first in the Meek division, the third time they had won the division in five years.

After another playoff disappointment behind them, the T-Wolves started the 2008–2009 season looking to take the next step and win the Kent Cup. They finished second in the Meek Division, five points behind first place Summerside and just one point ahead of third place Woodstock. In the first round the T-Wolves and the Slammers showed why they were so close in the standings. The series went seven games, the first seven-game series that the Timberwolves had ever been a part of in their nine years in the league. The T-Wolves came out on top winning the deciding game 3-2 thanks to Andrew White, who scored all three of the Timberwolves goals. Miramichi moved on to face Summerside in the division final. Summerside was riding high having just swept the Dieppe Commandos, and they swept the series on their way to winning the Kent Cup, making it the second straight season that the Timberwolves were beaten in the Meek Division final (the previous year they were defeated by the Woodstock Slammers in six games.)

The Wolves reached the Kent Cup final during the 2016–17 season, their best in franchise history. They lost to the Truro Bearcats in seven games.

Early in the 2022-23 season, after a few years of futility, the Wolves parted ways with head coach and general manager Rob MacDonald, who had been with the team since the 2011-12 campaign. The team ended up having its best regular season since 2016-17 after naming Kory Baker as his replacement, but fell to the Edmundston Blizzard in the Eastlink North Division semifinals.

== Season-by-season record ==
Season	GP	W	L	T	OTL	GF	GA	P	Results	Playoffs
2000-01	52	10	35	5	2	175	281	27	10th MJAHL	DNQ
2001-02	52	14	31	5	2	166	233	35	9th MJAHL	DNQ
2002-03	52	9	38	2	3	193	306	23	10th MJAHL	DNQ
2003-04	52	32	15	3	2	209	182	69	3rd MJAHL	Lost semi-final
2004-05	56	30	16	6	4	231	201	73	2nd MJAHL	Lost quarter-final
2005-06	56	16	37	0	3	187	280	35	12th MJAHL	DNQ
2006-07	58	39	13	0	6	239	200	84	3rd MJAHL	Lost quarter-final
2007-08	58	42	13	-	3	235	157	87	2nd MJAHL	Lost semi-final
2008-09	54	35	14	-	5	223	166	75	3rd MJAHL	Lost semi-final
2009-10	50	35	14	-	1	212	163	71	3rd MJAHL	Lost quarter-final
2010-11	52	29	17	-	6	206	190	64	5th MHL	Lost quarter-final
2011-12	52	12	36	-	4	151	252	28	11th MHL	DNQ
2012-13	52	26	24	-	2	180	214	54	8th MHL	Lost quarter-final
2013-14	52	37	10	-	5	234	141	79	2nd MHL	Lost semi-final
2014-15	48	28	18	-	2	188	160	58	5th MHL	Lost semi-final
2015-16	48	26	20	-	2	178	177	54	5th of 6 North; 8th of 12 MHL	DNQ
2016-17	50	35	12	2	1	227	161	73	1st of 6 North; 2nd of 12 MHL	Won Div. Semifinal 4-0 (Aces); Won Div. Finals 4-0 (Western Capitals); Lost League Finals 3-4 (Bearcats)
2017-18	50	23	21	3	3	163	162	52	4th of 6 North; 8th of 12 MHL	Lost div. semi-final 0-4 (Edmundston Blizzard)
2018-19	50	19	28	-	3	150	218	41	5th of 6 North; 10th of 12 MHL	DNQ
2019-20	52	12	35	-	5	162	279	29	6th of 6 North; 11th of 12 MHL	DNQ
2020-21	26	12	12	-	2	90	107	26	4th of 5 North; 8th of 12 MHL	2nd of 3 Div. play-in round (2-2); Won Div. Semifinal 3-2 (Campbellton Tigers); Lost Div. Finals 2-0 (Fredericton Red Wings)
2021-22	35	9	23	-	3	118	192	21	6th of 6 North; 11th of 12 MHL	DNQ
2022-23	52	26	18	-	8	249	249	60	4th of 6 North; 6th of 12 MHL	Lost Div. Semi-final 2-4 (Edmundston Blizzard)
2023-24	52	31	16	3	2	211	182	67	3rd of 6 North; 4th of 12 MHL	Won Div. Semi-final 4-1 (West Kent Steamers); Won Div. Finals 4-0 (Edmundston Blizzard); Won League Finals 4-2 (Summerside Western Capitals); Advance to Centennial Cup
2024-25	52	26	24	0	2	150	156	54	4th of 6 North; 8th of 12 MHL	Lost div. semi-final 1-5(Edmundston Blizzard)

== National championships ==
Year	Round-robin	Record	Standing	Quarterfinal	Semifinal	Championship
2024	L, Melfort Mustangs (SJHL), 1-4; W, Oakville Blades (Host), 7-4; W, Sioux Lookout Bombers (SIJHL), 5-3; SOW, Winkler Flyers (MJHL), 3-2	2-1-1-0	2nd of 5 Group B	Won 8-4; Navan Grads	Lost 2-5; Collingwood Blues	Did not qualify

== See also ==
- List of ice hockey teams in New Brunswick
- Maritime Junior Hockey League
- Miramichi Timberwolves official website
