= Amherst Ramblers =

- City: Amherst, Nova Scotia, Canada
- League: Maritime Junior Hockey League
- Division: Eastlink South Division
- Founded: 1966 (Berwick Bruins)
- Home arena: Amherst Stadium (The Jungle)
- Colours: Black, purple, and white
- General manager: Phillip Fife
- Head coach: Phillip Fife
- Media: FloHockey

Franchise history
- 1966–1967: Berwick Shell Junior Bruins
- 1967–1994: Amherst Ramblers
- 1994–1998: Amherst Mooseheads
- 1998–present: Amherst Ramblers

The Amherst Ramblers are a Junior A Hockey League team based in Amherst, Nova Scotia. The team is a member of the Maritime Junior Hockey League and are in the EastLink South Division. All home games are played out of the 2,500 seat Amherst Stadium. The season usually runs from mid-September to mid March every year.

== History ==
The Amherst Ramblers were founded in 1966 as the Berwick Shell Junior Bruins, and were founding members of the "Metro Valley Junior Hockey League". The league, then a junior B league, was eventually renamed the Maritime Junior A Hockey League. In 1967 the Bruins were relocated to Amherst and renamed the Amherst Ramblers.

The Ramblers have been known by two different names since moving to Amherst. Between 1994 and 1998 the team was known as the Moosheads. The logo consisted of a large letter "A" and the moose from Moosehead beer - similar in design to the current Halifax Mooseheads logo.

The Ramblers are known to draw some of the largest crowds in the Maritime Hockey League, and have placed third in average attendance the last few years, only behind the Yarmouth Mariners and the Weeks Crushers.

The Ramblers hosted the Centennial Cup (now known as Royal Bank Cup) in 1993, and they also hosted the Fred Page Cup in 2019.

== Season-by-season record ==
Season	GP	W	L	T	OTL	GF	GA	P	Results	Playoffs
1973-74	33	13	6	4	-	142	153	30	7th MVJHL	
1974-75	Statistics Not Available									
1975-76	32	14	14	4	-	142	153	32	4th MVJHL	
1976-77	32	7	24	1	-	109	198	15	8th MVJHL	
1977-78	36	16	17	3	-	167	173	35	5th MVJHL	
1978-79	35	9	23	3	-	156	217	21	6th MVJHL	
1979-80	Statistics Not Available									
1980-81	39	13	24	2	-	218	360	28	4th MVJHL	
1981-82	40	14	23	3	-	205	278	31	5th MVJHL	
1982-83	40	9	29	3	-	--	--	19	5th MVJHL	
1983-84	40	12	28	0	-	231	333	24	5th MVJHL	
1984-85	40	11	26	3	-	163	229	25	4th MVJHL	
1985-86	40	9	28	3	-	176	276	21	4th MVJHL	
1986-87	40	4	31	5	-	145	316	13	6th MVJHL	
1987-88	40	14	20	5	-	202	224	33	5th MVJHL	
1988-89	38	10	19	9	-	189	227	29	5th MVJHL	
1989-90	40	21	13	6	-	243	205	48	4th MVJHL	Won League
1990-91	40	27	9	4	-	301	175	58	1st MVJHL	
1991-92	46	19	16	11	-	236	213	49	5th MJAHL	
1992-93	48	25	16	7	0	268	220	57	2nd MJAHL	Won League
1993-94	47	20	23	3	1	223	255	44	4th MJAHL	
1994-95	48	20	24	4	0	207	246	44	5th MJAHL	
1995-96	54	28	24	2	0	251	230	58	4th MJAHL	
1996-97	56	19	31	2	4	269	307	44	8th MJAHL	
1997-98	52	19	31	1	1	236	297	40	8th MJAHL	
1998-99	48	14	30	4	-	191	277	32	7th MJAHL	
1999-00	52	8	41	3	0	159	279	19	9th MJAHL	
2000-01	52	18	32	1	1	195	271	38	9th MJAHL	
2001-02	52	25	20	3	4	202	180	57	4th MJAHL	
2002-03	52	29	16	4	3	273	203	65	3rd MJAHL	
2003-04	52	20	29	3	0	190	253	43	8th MJAHL	
2004-05	56	25	24	6	1	212	210	57	7th MJAHL	
2005-06	56	33	18	0	5	218	203	71	3rd MJAHL	Lost Final
2006-07	58	35	17	0	6	268	208	76	5th MJAHL	Lost Division Semifinal
2007-08	58	30	23	-	5	169	180	65	7th MJAHL	
2008-09	54	30	19	-	5	193	167	65	6th MJAHL	
2009-10	50	20	28	-	2	148	42	8th MJAHL	Lost Preliminary	
2010-11	52	22	27	-	3	174	211	47	9th MHL	DNQ
2011-12	52	31	15	-	6	201	160	68	3rd MHL	Lost Division Final
2012-13	52	32	14	-	6	216	153	70	4th MHL	Lost Division Final
2013-14	52	31	18	-	3	202	162	65	4th MHL	Lost Division Semifinal
2014-15	48	12	32	-	4	163	260	28	11th MHL	DNQ
2015-16	48	17	29	1	1	142	187	36	5th of 6 South; 10th of 12 MHL	DNQ
2016-17	50	31	14	3	2	201	174	67	4th of 6 South; 5th of 12 MHL	Won Div. Semifinal 4-3 (Crushers); Lost Div. Finals, 1-4 (Bearcats)
2017-18	50	27	11	6	6	181	158	66	3rd of 6 South; 5th of 12 MHL	Lost Div. Semifinal 3-4 (Lumberjacks)
2018-19	50	36	11	2	1	204	134	75	2nd of 6 South; 3rd of 12 MHL	Lost Div. Semifinal 3-4 (Lumberjacks)
2019-20	52	30	21	1	0	202	188	61	2nd of 6 South; 5th of 12 MHL	Playoffs Cancelled due to COVID-19 pandemic
2020-21	34	22	7	1	4	135	103	49	2nd of 6 South; 2nd of 12 MHL	Playoffs impacted due to COVID-19 pandemic
2021-22	37	19	14	2	2	106	114	42	2nd of 6 South; 6th of 12 MHL	Lost Div. Semifinals 1-4 (Truro Bearcats}
2022-23	52	16	30	4	2	143	201	38	5th of 6 South; 11th of 12 MHL	Did Not Qualify for Post Season
2023-24	52	27	20	3	2	204	216	59	2nd of 6 South; 5th of 12 MHL	Won Div. Semifinals 4-2 (Pictou Crushers} Lost Div. Finals 2-4 (Summerside Western Capitals)
2024-25	52	35	15	2	0	245	179	72	2nd of 6 South; 3rd of 12 MHL	Lost Div. Semifinals 2-4 (Truro Bearcats}

== Fred Page Cup ==
The Ramblers competed in their 1st ever Fred Page Cup in 2019. They came 3rd.

Eastern Canada Championships
MHL - QAAAJHL - CCHL - Host
Round robin play with 2nd vs 3rd in semi-final to advance against 1st in the finals.

Year	Round Robin	Record	Standings	Semi-Final	Gold Medal Game
2019 (Host)	L, Ottawa Jr. Senators 1-4; W, Yarmouth Mariners 5-3; L, Princeville Titans 0-5	1-2-0	3rd of 4	L, Ottawa Jr. Senators 3-4	Did not qualify

== Notable alumni ==
- Bill Riley
- Mal Davis
- Joey MacDonald
- Bill Chapman
- Mark Lee
- Keith Blenkhorn
- Zack MacEwen

== See also ==
- List of ice hockey teams in Nova Scotia

== Sources ==
- Cole, Darrell (12 October 2017). "Ramblers awarded 2019 Fred Page Cup". saltwire.com. Postmedia.
- La Rose, Jason (1 May 2019). "Road to the 2019 National Junior A Championship: Fred Page Cup". hockeycanada.ca (Press release).
- "Road to the NJAC" (PDF). hockeycanada.ca.
- Cole, Darrell (10 December 2018). "Amherst's Fred Page Cup host committee on target for 2019 tournament in May". saltwire.com. Postmedia.
- Cole, Darrell (27 May 2019). "Tournament chairman looks back at what was a successful Fred Page Cup". saltwire.com. Postmedia.
- Mathieson, Dave (5 May 2019). "Last-second goal lifts Ottawa over Amherst". saltwire.com. Postmedia.
- Cole, Darrell (25 April 2019). "Yarmouth enters Fred Page Cup on a roll". saltwire.com. Postmedia.
- Cole, Darrell (1 May 2019). "Amherst Ramblers ready for Fred Page Cup". saltwire.com. Postmedia.
- Cole, Darrell (10 December 2017). "World Junior A exhibition game a test for Amherst Stadium". saltwire.com. Postmedia.
- Cole, Darrell (13 March 2018). "Fred Page Cup ticket details released". saltwire.com. Postmedia.
- Fraser, Jeremy (3 May 2019). "Yarmouth Mariners eliminated from Fred Page Cup". saltwire.com. Postmedia.
- Comeau, Tina (20 April 2019). "Yarmouth Mariners are MHL Canadian Tire Cup champions after sweeping Campbellton Tigers in league final". saltwire.com. Postmedia.
- "MHL extends condolences after the passing of Bill Riley". themhl.ca. Maritime Junior Hockey League. 29 March 2026.
