= Truro Bearcats =

Junior ice hockey club

- City: Truro, Nova Scotia
- League: MHL
- Division: South
- Founded: 1997
- Home arena: Rath Eastlink Community Centre
- Colours: Red; Black
- General manager: James Barbour
- Head coach: Ryan Falkenham
- Website: trurojrabearcats.ca

Championships
- League: 2005; 2007; 2014; 2017; 2026
- Regional: 2013

The Truro Bearcats are a junior ice hockey club and franchise of the Maritime Junior Hockey League (MHL). The team plays its home games at the Rath Eastlink Community Centre in Truro, Nova Scotia.

== Arena ==
The town of Truro and County of Colchester are constructing the new Central Nova Scotia Civic Centre, a rink that is supposed to seat 2600+ spectators. The rink will be the new home of the Bearcats upon completion. The Bearcats will kick off their inaugural season in the new building by hosting the Fred Page Cup for the second time in franchise history (The first being in 2002) .

On February 13, 2013 officials from the Rath Eastlink Community Centre confirmed the first home game for the Bearcats would be held on March 2, 2013, and would coincide with the opening of the new facility. The Bearcats are not charging any admission fee to their inaugural game in the community centre, but will be accepting donations to local a charity. Management is hoping for a large crowd in anticipation of the arena finally opening after many delays.

== Branding ==
Since 2015, the Truro Bearcats primary logo is large red or black T while their secondary logo features a bearcat jumping. In print, or other media the Bearcats logo consists of a large red T with a small jumping bearcat to the lower right.

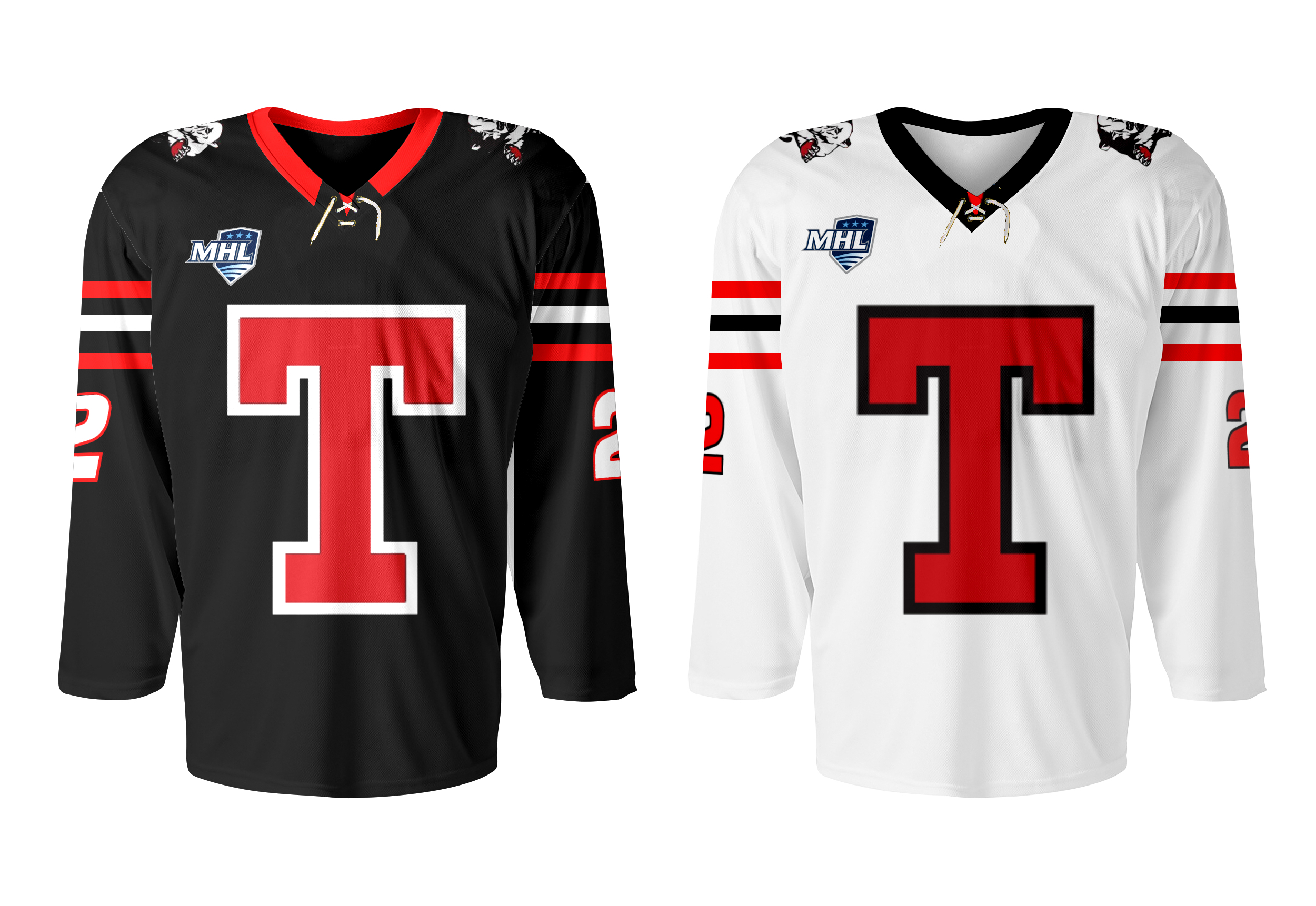

2009–2015

This jersey unveiled in the 2009-10 season features a large T on the front and the design of the Boston Bruins from 1995-2007. The jersey design is similar to the uniform the Bearcats would have worn in the 1920s and was implemented to bring back some tradition to the community.

1997-2009

The logo is similar to that of the Florida Panthers of the NHL. The Bearcats' old jersey is that of the Buffalo Sabres from 1996/97 - 2005/06.

== History ==
=== Metro Valley Junior Hockey League ===
Originally, Truro was a member of the Metro Valley Junior Hockey League. The Bearcats won five championships in the MVJHL. Three back to back from 1969-70 to 1971-72. Truro won two more championships in 1973-74 and 1975-76. In 1977 the MVJHL became a Junior "A" league and the Bearcats folded mid season in 1983.

=== Maritime Junior Hockey League ===
The new franchise of 1997 marked the return of junior hockey to Truro, and the Bearcats return to the MJAHL. The Truro Bearcats were formed in 1997 as a member of the Maritime Jr A Hockey League. The Bearcats have stayed competitive over their franchise history, they have never had a losing record, and have never missed the playoffs.

During the 2001 MJAHL Draft, the Bearcats picked 13-year-old Sidney Crosby. During the 2001-02 season, as a call-up, Crosby played a two-game call-up stint with the Bearcats.

In 2002, the Truro Bearcats played in their first Fred Page Cup as the host squad. They made four other appearances three as MJAHL champions, one in 2005, at a tournament hosted in Yarmouth, Nova Scotia, and one in 2007 Saint-Jérôme Quebec. In 2013 the Bearcats hosted the tournament for a second time and a first time at their new home Rath Eastlink Community Centre winning the Final 3-2 in double Overtime against the Summerside Western Capitals. In 2014 The Bearcats made a second consecutive appearance in the Fred Page Cup tournament hosted by Saint-Jérôme

Truro captured their third Division Championship and third Provincial Championship in five seasons in 2008/09. The Bearcats would be defeated by the Summerside Western Capitals in the league final four games to one.

The 2011-12 season was the Bearcats final full season at the Colchester Legion Stadium.

Note: GP = Games played, W = Wins, L = Losses, T = Ties, OTL = Overtime Losses, Pts = Points, GF = Goals for, GA = Goals against, PIM = Penalties in minutes

Statistics
Season	GP	W	L	T	OTL/ SOL	GF	GA	P	Results (Division)	Results (League)	Playoffs
1997-98	51	27	19	4	2	253	207	60	2nd Maurice Bent	4th MJAHL	Lost Division-Final
1998-99	48	31	16	1	2	222	154	63	3rd Maurice Bent	4th MJAHL	Lost quarter-final
1999-00	52	32	17	3	0	231	180	67	3rd Maurice Bent	4th MJAHL	Lost quarter-final
2000-01	52	22	21	7	2	202	201	53	3rd Maurice Bent	6th MJAHL	Lost quarter-final
2001-02	52	28	16	6	2	195	155	64	2nd Maurice Bent	3rd MJAHL	Lost quarter-final 4th at Fred Page Cup
2002-03	52	34	14	2	2	211	164	72	1st Maurice Bent	2nd MJAHL	Lost Division-Final
2003-04	52	33	10	7	2	193	146	75	2nd Maurice Bent	2nd MJAHL	Lost Division-Final
2004-05	56	24	15	12	5	183	159	65	2nd Maurice Bent	4th MJAHL	Won League; 4th at Fred Page Cup
2005-06	56	28	20	0	8	193	166	64	4th Maurice Bent	7th MJAHL	Lost Preliminary
2006-07	58	42	12	0	4	257	138	88	1st Maurice Bent	1st MJAHL	Won League; 4th at Fred Page Cup
2007-08	58	37	11	-	10	210	138	84	2nd Maurice Bent	4th MJAHL	Lost quarter-final
2008-09	54	36	12	-	6	212	127	78	1st Maurice Bent	2nd MJAHL	Lost final
2009-10	50	37	7	-	6	214	104	80	1st Maurice Bent	2nd MJAHL	Lost quarter-final
2010-11	52	30	18	-	4	166	128	64	2nd Maurice Bent	4th MHL	Lost quarter-final
2011-12	52	29	20	-	3	190	155	61	3rd Maurice Bent	4th MHL	Lost quarter-final
2012-13	52	38	9	-	5	226	124	81	1st Eastlink	2nd MHL	Lost final Won Fred Page Cup; 5th at Royal Bank Cup
2013-14	52	38	11	-	3	243	131	79	1st Eastlink	1st MHL	Won league 3rd at Fred Page Cup
2014-15	48	25	19	-	4	180	154	54	4th Eastlink	8th MHL	Lost League Final
2015-16	48	25	15	-	8	134	116	58	1st South	4th MHL	Lost quarter-final
2016-17	50	35	13	-	2	196	154	72	2nd South	3rd MHL	Won Div. Semifinal 4-1 (Mariners); Won Div. Finals 4-1 (Ramblers); Won League Finals 4-3 (Timberwolves); MJAHL Champions
2017-18	50	28	20	-	2	150	130	58	4th South	6th MHL	Lost div. semi-final 3-4 (Mariners)
2018-19	50	24	21	-	5	135	158	53	4th South	7th MHL	Lost div. semi-final 0-4 (Mariners)
2019-20	52	28	18	-	8	170	166	60	4th South	8th MHL	Cancelled
2020-21	32	21	10	-	1	125	94	43	3rd South	3rd MHL	Cancelled
2021-22	36	19	15	-	2	116	111	40	3rd South	7th MHL	Won Div. Semifinal 4-1 (Ramblers); Won Div. Finals 4-3 (Wildcats); Lost League Finals 4-1 (Western Capitals)
2022-23	52	33	16	1	2	214	174	69	2nd South	4th MHL	Won Div. Semifinal 4-2 (Wildcats); Lost Div. Finals 0-4 (Western Capitals)
2023-24	52	25	21	4	2	212	193	56	5th South	8th MHL	Did not qualify
2024-25	52	28	22	1	1	170	148	58	3rd of 6 South	6thof 12 MHL	Won Div Semifinals 4-2 (Ramblers); Lost Div Finals (Crushers)
2025–26	52	34	14	0	4	194	145	72	1st in division	2nd overall	Won quarterfinal against Pictou County (4:1); Won semifinal against Summerside (4:3); Won final against Edmundston (4:1)

Source: "Truro Bearcats statistics and history". hockeydb.com.

== Fred Page Cup ==
Eastern Canada Championships
MHL - QAAAJHL - CCHL - Host
Round robin play with 2nd vs 3rd in semi-final to advance against 1st in the finals.

Year	Round Robin	Record	Standing	Semifinal	Gold Medal Game
2002; HOST	L, Halifax Oland Exports 0-5; L, Ottawa Jr. Senators 0-6; W, Valleyfield Braves 4-0	1-2-0	4th of 4	Did not qualify	
2005	L, Vaudreuil Mustangs 1-3; L, Hawkesbury Hawks 1-2; L, Yarmouth Mariners 2-3 OT	0-3-0	4th of 4	Did not qualify	
2007	L, Joliette Action 2-3; L, St. Jerome Panthers 3-5; W, Pembroke Lumber Kings 3-2	1-2-0	4th of 4	Did not qualify	
2013; HOST	W, Collège Français de Longueuil 4-1; W, Cornwall Colts 6-2; W, Summerside Western Capitals 3-2	3-0-0	1st of 4	Semi-final bye	Won 3-2 2OT; Summerside Western Capitals advance to Royal Bank Cup
2014	W, Granby Inouk 5-4 OT; L, St. Jerome Panthers 6-7 OT; L, Carleton Place Canadians 1-2	1-1-1	3rd of 4	Lost 2-5; St. Jerome Panthers	Did not qualify
2017	L, Terrebonne Cobras 2-8; L, Collège Français de Longueuil 4-6; L, Carleton Place Canadians 1-3	0-3-0	4th of 4	Did not qualify	

== National championships ==
Year	Round Robin	Record W-OTW-OTL-L	Standing	Semifinal	Gold Medal Game
2013	L, Brooks Bandits 1-7; L, Surrey Eagles 0-7; L, Minnesota Wilderness 3-5; W, Summerside Western Capitals 4-2	1-0-3-0	4th of 5	Did not qualify	

== Franchise records ==
These are franchise records held by previous team rosters.

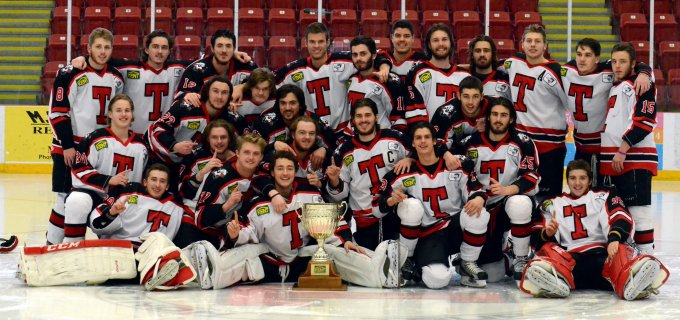
2014 Truro Bearcats with the Kent Cup

Team Records for a single season
Statistic	Total	Season
Most Points	88	2006–07
Most Wins	42	2006–07
Most Goals For	257	2006–07
Fewest Goals For	180	2014–15
Fewest Goals Against	104	2009–10
Most Goals Against	201	2000–01

== Notable alumni ==
The Truro Bearcats have had many players develop and pass through the organization. Many have gone on to play university hockey and major junior hockey. Truro has also had players move on to play in the National Hockey League or American Hockey League.

- Andrew MacDonald
- Zach Sill
- Matt Climie
- David Brine
- Sidney Crosby

== See also ==
- List of ice hockey teams in Nova Scotia

== Sources ==
- Rawding, Aidan (2 June 2026). "Truro Bearcats announce Falkenham as new head coach". saltwire.com. Postmedia.
- "CJHL 'Teams to Watch'". cjhlhockey.com (Press release). Toronto: Canadian Junior Hockey League. 21 September 2026.
