= Yarmouth Mariners =

- City: Yarmouth, Nova Scotia, Canada
- League: Maritime Junior Hockey League
- Division: Eastlink South
- Founded: 1976 (Cole Harbour Colts)
- Home arena: Mariners Centre (The Fish Tank)
- Colours: Navy, Gold, Aluminum Silver and White
- Owners: Laurie Barron, John Murphy, Jared Purdy & Alex Pink
- General manager: Laurie Barron
- Head coach: Laurie Barron

Franchise history
- 1976-1995: Cole Harbour Colts
- 1995-2000: East Hants Penguins
- 2000-2002: Dartmouth DQ Blizzard
- 2002-Present: Yarmouth Mariners

Championships
- Playoff championships: 2008 2019 2023

The Yarmouth Mariners are a Junior "A" team based in Yarmouth, Nova Scotia. They play in the Maritime Junior Hockey League. All home games are played out of the 1,501 seat Mariners Centre. The season usually runs from mid-September to early March every year.

== History ==
The franchise that would eventually become the Mariners saw its first year of action in 76' as the Cole Harbour Colts. The team would remain as the Colts until 1997, where the club would turn hands and become none other than the East Hants Penguins. In 2000, the Penguins were purchased by Paul Currie, moved to Dartmouth and named the Dartmouth DQ Blizzard.

Currie ran the franchise for two seasons in Dartmouth. Although the club fared reasonably well in the standings, attendance was poor and sponsorship support was thin as the team competed heavily with Major Junior and University hockey for attention. Currie quickly made a decision to relocate the team.

Although it was not the only location considered, Yarmouth quickly became the front-runner and in 2002 Currie secured league approval and moved his team to Southwestern Nova Scotia where they would become the Yarmouth MotorMart Mariners. In their first season, the team managed to place third in the Bent and enjoyed immense fan and community support.

The 2003/2004 season was a memorable one for the team. The Mariners had a strong club and managed to plow through the playoffs with scoring from the likes of Jason Hedges, Steve Yetman, Grant Kenney, Matt Oxtoby and Justin d'Entremont. It was an exciting time for the team and their fans. However, the Mariners faced a very well coached Campbellton Tigers in the league final. Yarmouth split the first two games at home with the Tigers, but lost two in Campbellton. Returning to Yarmouth, the Mariners surrendered the championship to Campbellton. Even with the loss, fans stayed loyal and were delighted with the great hockey they had seen that season.

2004/2005 was the year Yarmouth hosted the Fred Page Cup. The Mariners ended up with 38 wins and just 14 losses. The team worked to take a league title and participate in the Fred Page Cup. In a turn of events, the Mariners were hit by a number of injuries at the worst time. In the first round of the playoffs, goalie Matt Anthony was ousted from play with a knee injury. Soon after, his backup, Matt Bracegirdle would injure his groin. Losing both goalies, coupled with other injuries, led to the Mariners falling to the Truro Bearcats in round two. Truro would go on to take the league title that season from defending Champions the Campbellton Tigers.

Logo from 1997-2000

With a month to rest, heal and re-organize Yarmouth was ready for the Fred Page Cup. After defeating the Hawsbury Hawks in their first game, Yarmouth went 3–0 in round-robin play, much to the delight of their fans. A key component to the three wins was the return of both Matt Anthony and Matt Bracegirdle. But in the championship game, Yarmouth came up short one goal and the Hawks would leave town with the Fred Page Cup.

In 2005–2006, long-time assistant coach Laurie Barron would take on the head coaching duties. Many key veterans had moved on from the previous year, and the Mariners would find that they were to face a stronger Bent division than in previous seasons. Although the club had plenty of highs during the year, they would finish in 5th place, resulting in a 3-game mini-series with Truro. The Mariners managed to edge the Bearcats and move on, but fell to Amherst in the next round.

During the 2006–2007 season, the Mariners had a dismal season, mired in last place in the MJAHL's Bent Division basement. Paul Currie stepped down from the head coach/GM position in January, but continued behind the scenes work until the team was turned over in April. Finally, on April 3, 2007, the sale of the Mariners to East Hants Penguins (NSJHL) owner Jack Ross was completed and a new era of Mariners hockey would begin.

Following the sale of the team, the new organization quickly began to demonstrate its eagerness to return to winning form, and its dedication to bringing quality Junior A Hockey back to Yarmouth and its loyal fans and sponsors. The Mariners quickly unveiled a brand new logo and jersey and announced, to the surprise of many, that NHL legend Steve Kasper would take on the job of head coach with Laurie Barron as his assistant. Over the spring and summer months, General Manager Jack Ross made numerous player movements, determined to bring in high-caliber players and instill a new belief that Yarmouth will again find itself at the top of Junior A hockey.

During the 2007–2008 season, the Mariners had many name players on the squad, which led to a very strong team. At the trading deadline in January, the Mariners only got stronger by acquiring league-leading scorer Itan Chavira, a pick-up which paid tremendous dividends for them. On February 24, 2008, with a 6–3 victory over the Halifax Wolverines on home ice, the Mariners clinched 1st overall in the MJAHL, and completed their worst-to-first turnaround in one season. In the opening round of the playoffs, the Mariners defeated the rival Amherst Ramblers 4 games to 1. In round 2, the Mariners defeated the Weeks Crushers, who hosted the 2008 Fred Page Cup, 4 games to 1, to win the Bent Division Championship. On a roll, the Mariners faced stiff opposition in the Championship Finals versus the Woodstock Slammers. After a huge 4–0 win on home ice April 15, the Mariners traveled to Woodstock for Game 6 on April 17, defeating them 3–1 and winning the series 4 games to 2, in the process clinching the Mariners first MJAHL Championship, the Kent Cup. At the 2008 Fred Page Cup, two losses on consecutive nights to eventual Champion Weeks Crushers ended the season for the club, its most successful to date.

In the 2014-15 MHL season the Mariners drew the largest average attendance.

== Season-by-season record ==
Season	GP	W	L	T	OTL	GF	GA	P	Results	Playoffs
1976-77	33	20	12	1	-	160	127	41	3rd MVJHL	
1977-78	36	23	10	3	-	197	129	49	2nd MVJHL	Won League
1978-79	34	22	9	3	-	225	143	47	2nd MVJHL	
1979-80	Statistics Not Available									
1980-81	40	28	8	4	-	291	178	60	2nd MVJHL	Won League
1981-82	40	25	10	5	-	243	170	55	1st MVJHL	
1982-83	39	26	9	4	-	--	--	56	1st MVJHL	
1983-84	40	25	11	4	-	328	242	54	2nd MVJHL	
1984-85	40	31	5	4	-	244	162	66	1st MVJHL	Won League
1985-86	40	32	6	2	-	289	146	66	1st MVJHL	Won League
1986-87	40	8	24	8	-	175	274	24	5th MVJHL	
1987-88	40	12	20	8	-	192	238	32	6th MVJHL	
1988-89	37	4	33	0	-	139	344	8	6th MVJHL	
1989-90	39	5	30	4	-	159	308	14	6th MVJHL	
1990-91	39	6	26	7	-	150	253	19	6th MVJHL	
1991-92	46	12	29	5	-	210	285	29	7th MJAHL	
1992-93	48	11	29	4	4	183	294	30	7th MJAHL	
1993-94	48	20	24	2	2	220	246	44	5th MJAHL	
1994-95	48	18	26	4	0	187	230	40	6th MJAHL	
1995-96	54	28	25	0	1	212	217	57	6th MJAHL	
1996-97	56	35	18	3	0	265	207	73	3rd MJAHL	
1997-98	52	21	26	4	1	192	218	47	6th MJAHL	
1998-99	48	10	36	2	-	163	264	24	8th MJAHL	
1999-00	52	8	34	9	1	134	240	26	8th MJAHL	
2000-01	52	20	23	3	6	193	226	49	7th MJAHL	
2001-02	52	27	23	2	0	171	190	56	5th MJAHL	
2002-03	52	24	22	1	5	251	246	54	5th MJAHL	
2003-04	52	37	12	2	1	277	169	77	1st MJAHL	
2004-05	56	38	14	4	0	263	151	80	1st MJAHL	Lost semi-final
2005-06	56	28	23	0	5	204	221	62	8th MJAHL	Lost quarter-final
2006-07	58	17	35	0	6	209	306	40	10th MJAHL	DNQ
2007-08	58	42	12	-	4	266	167	88	1st MJAHL	Won League
2008-09	54	29	19	-	6	207	185	64	7th MJAHL	
2009-10	50	19	27	-	4	136	183	42	9th MJAHL	DNQ
2010-11	52	28	22	-	2	199	189	58	6th MHL	Lost semi-final
2011-12	52	35	14	-	3	219	136	73	2nd MHL	Lost finals
2012-13	52	37	10	-	5	215	139	79	3rd MHL	Lost quarter-final
2013-14	52	31	18	-	3	192	183	65	5th MHL	Lost Mini-Series
2014-15	48	29	15	-	4	223	170	62	4th MHL	Lost quarter-final
2015-16	48	13	35	-	0	141	222	26	6th of 6 South; 11th of 12 MHL	did not qualify
2016-17	50	32	12	2	4	184	145	70	3rd of 6 South; 4th of 12 MHL	Lost div. semi-final 1–4 (Bearcats)
2017-18	50	35	14	1	0	185	137	71	1st of 6 South; 2nd of 12 MHL	Won Div. Semifinal 4–3 (Bearcats); Won Div. Finals 4–1 (Lumberjacks); Lost MHL Finals 2–4 (Blizzard)
2018-19	50	36	9	3	2	219	142	77	1st of 6 South; 2nd of 12 MHL	Won Div. Semifinal 4–0 (Bearcats); Won Div. Finals 4–2 (Lumberjacks); Won MHL Finals 4–0 (Tigers)
2019-20	52	29	17	3	3	189	158	64	1st of 6 South; 2nd of 12 MHL	Cancelled due to COVID-19 pandemic
2020-21	36	27	8	1	0	146	82	55	1st of 7 South 1st of 12 MHL	Cancelled due to COVID-19 pandemic
2021-22	38	25	8	4	1	154	108	55	1st of 6 South 2nd of 12 MHL	Lost Div. Semifinal 2-4 (Wildcats)
2022-23	52	41	9	2	0	230	132	84	1st of 6 South 1st of 12 MHL	Won Div. Semifinal 4–0 (Crushers); Won Div. Finals 4–0 (Bearcats); Won MHL Finals 4–0 (Blizzard); Advance to Centennial Cup
2023-24	52	26	20	3	3	178	186	58	4th of 6 South; 8th of 12 MHL	Lost Div. Semifinal 1-4 (Western Capitals)
2024-25	52	21	30	0	1	161	222	43	5th of 6 South; 9th of 12 MHL	Did Not Qualify for Post Season

== Centennial Cup - Revised format 2022 ==
Canadian Jr. A National Championships
Maritime Junior Hockey League, Quebec Junior Hockey League, Central Canada Hockey League, Ontario Junior Hockey League, Northern Ontario Junior Hockey League, Superior International Junior Hockey League, Manitoba Junior Hockey League, Saskatchewan Junior Hockey League, Alberta Junior Hockey League, and Host. The BCHL declared itself an independent league and there is no BC representative.
Round-robin play in two 5-team pools with top three in pool advancing to determine a Champion.

Year	Round-robin	Record	Standing	Quarterfinal	Semifinal	Championship
2023	L, Brooks Bandits (AJHL), 2–7; OTL, Timmins Rock (NOJHL), 3-4; L, Ottawa Jr. Senators (CCHL), 3-4; W, Terrebonne Cobras (QJHL), 3-2	1-0-2-1	3rd of 5 Pool A	Lost 1-2; Portage Terriers	did not qualified	did not qualified

=== Franchise records ===
These are franchise records held by previous team rosters. Figures are updated after each completed MHL regular season.

Team Records for a single season
Statistic	Total	Season
Most Points	88	2007-08
Most Wins	42	2007-08
Most Goals For	328	1983-84
Fewest Goals For	134	1999-00
Fewest Goals Against	127	1976-77
Most Goals Against	344	1988-89

== See also ==
- List of ice hockey teams in Nova Scotia
