= Maritime Junior Hockey League =

Canadian ice hockey league, founded 1967

- Current season, competition or edition: 2026–27 MHL season
- Sport: Ice hockey
- Founded: 1967
- President: Connor Cameron
- No. of teams: 12
- Countries: Canada
- Headquarters: Bedford, Nova Scotia
- Most recent champion: Truro Bearcats (2026)
- Most titles: (Jr. A) Pictou County Crushers (11); (Jr. B) Truro Bearcats (5)
- Broadcaster: Eastlink Community TV
- Website: www.themhl.ca

The Maritime Junior Hockey League (MHL) is a Junior A ice hockey league under Hockey Canada, a part of the Canadian Junior Hockey League (CJHL). It consists of six teams from New Brunswick, which make up the EastLink North Division (formerly Roger Meek), five teams from Nova Scotia, and one team from Prince Edward Island, which make up the Eastlink South Division. The winner of the MHL playoffs competes for the Centennial Cup against the winners of the 8 other tier 2 junior A leagues across Canada (host team also participates). Prior to the pandemic the MHL champions participated in the Fred Page Cup. This tournament involved the Bogart Cup champions from the Central Canada Hockey League (Ontario), the Kent Cup champions from the MHL (Maritimes) and the winner of La Coupe Napa of the Quebec Junior Hockey League (Quebec) as well as a predetermined host. The winner moved on to compete for the Canadian National Junior A Championship. However with the departure of the British Columbia Hockey League from affiliation with the CJHL in March 2021 as well as Hockey Canada in June 2023, no Centennial Cup qualifying tournaments such as the Kent Cup have been played since 2022, and instead all the league champions directly advance to the Centennial Cup.

== History ==
Originally known as the Metro Valley Junior Hockey League (MVJHL), the league was founded in 1967 as a Junior "B" level hockey league. Originally an exclusively Nova Scotia hockey league, it included six teams: East Hants Junior Penguins, Halifax Colonels, Dartmouth Hoyts, Windsor Royals, Kentville Riteways, and Berwick Shell Juniors. 1968 saw the Truro Bearcats and Amherst Ramblers replace the teams from Kentville and Berwick. In 1971–72 the New Glasgow Bombers and the Pictou Maripacs entered the league. Stellarton and a new Kentville franchise entered the league in 1973 and 1974 respectively.

In 1977, the MVJHL entered into the Tier II Junior "A" level. The jump to Junior "A" was, in theory, to be a catalyst for the development of the league. However the budgets necessary to play at the Jr. 'A' level resulted in the immediate withdrawal of the Chester Ravens and the East Hants Penguins. The Cole Harbour Colts (Scotia Colts), who entered the league in 1976, became the first team in league history to host the national Junior A championship, then known as the Centennial Cup, in 1980.

The 1983 season saw the addition of the expansion Moncton Midland Hawks of Moncton, New Brunswick, the league's first non-Nova Scotia team. The Hawks came from the New Brunswick Junior Hockey League and are now known as the Edmundston Blizzard. In 1986, the league expanded to Antigonish and the Scotia Colts, again, hosted the Centennial Cup. Future Maritime Junior Hockey League team Summerside Western Capitals, then competing in the Island Junior Hockey League (IJHL), hosted the 1989 Centennial Cup.

In 1991, the Summerside Western Capitals and the Charlottetown Abbies left Prince Edward Island's IJHL and joined the MVJHL, which was immediately renamed the Maritime Junior A Hockey League (MJAHL).

According to league officials, it is believed that goaltender Lisa Herritt of the Dartmouth Oland Exports became the first female MHL player in the 1995–96 season.

For the 1996–97 season, the league added the Cape Breton Islanders and Restigouche River Rats. In 1996–97 the league consisted of the Amherst Ramblers, Antigonish Bulldogs, Charlottetown Abbies, East Hants Penguins, Dartmouth Oland Exports, Moncton Gagnon Beavers, Saint John Alpines, and Summerside Western Capitals. The Saint John Alpines folded in January. With financial losses totalling $40,000 and an additional $50,000 shortfall projected should the team finish the season, they simply ran out of money. The Summerside Western Capitals won the league's first ever national title. The Capitals hosted the Royal Bank Cup at Cahill Stadium and won the championship game 4–3 over the South Surrey Eagles.

Truro and Bathurst received approval for new teams to start in 1997–98 but due to the relocation of the Quebec Major Junior Hockey League's Laval Titan to Bathurst, the Truro Bearcats would be the sole new team. The Cape Breton Islanders moved to Glace Bay and became the Glace Bay Miners, but with the arrival of the Quebec Major Junior Hockey League's Cape Breton Screaming Eagles, they folded in December of that season, leaving the league with nine teams again.

During the 1998–99 season two teams changed their names. The first was the Dartmouth Oland Exports when they moved to the Halifax Forum to become the Halifax Oland Exports. The second was the 1998–99 MJAHL champions, the Restigouche River Rats, as they changed their name to the Campbellton Tigers.

A tenth team was added for the 2000–01 season, the Miramichi Timberwolves. At the same time, the East Hants Penguins moved to Dartmouth and became the Scotia Dairy Queen Blizzard. At the end of the 2001–02 season, the league approved the transfer of the Blizzard to Yarmouth. The Yarmouth Motormart Mariners began play in September 2002. In early 2003 the league governors approved expansion into Woodstock, N.B., with the Slammers beginning play in the 2003–04 season.

The league hired its first professional full-time league president in 2003, Vernon Doyle.

The league won their second national Junior A championship when the Halifax Oland Exports won the 2002 Royal Bank Cup on home ice. One year later, after financial trouble with Oland Brewery, the franchise's name was changed to Halifax Team Pepsi. In the spring of 2004, the Weeks Hockey Organization bought the club, moved it to New Glasgow and renamed it the Pictou County Weeks Crushers. On that same day Halifax was granted an expansion franchise, the Halifax Wolverines.

The MJAHL made a number of changes in the spring of 2008.

On April 15, the Antigonish Bulldogs announced that they were applying for a leave of absence for one year. On April 26, the Bulldogs had to choose between two groups trying to buy the team and relocate it. The first group would move the franchise to New Richmond, Quebec. The other group would relocate the team to the Halifax area. At the board of governors meeting that day, the proposal to relocate the franchise to Quebec was deemed to not be in the best interests of the league and its members. The Governors did leave the door open to the sale to a Halifax group and a move to Metro Halifax. The sale and relocation of the franchise to Halifax was later approved.

At the same Governors meeting, in response to the decision to leave the door open on the sale of the Bulldogs, the owners of the Halifax Wolverines announced their plans to move to Bridgewater. The Governors approved the move. Following a name the team contest, the franchise was dubbed the Bridgewater Lumberjacks.

Later that week on April 29, the Moncton Beavers announced that they had failed to come to terms on a new lease for the Tim Hortons 4-Ice centre and had subsequently moved themselves to the neighboring city of Dieppe. The team was renamed the Dieppe Commandos.

On May 1, with the fifth and final change for the MJAHL within a span of 16 days, the Charlottetown Abbies applied for a leave of absence for one year, which was accepted.

The Halifax franchise (former Antigonish Bulldogs) announced on August 22 that the club would be known as the Halifax Lions. This was the name of the successful Halifax team in the 1980s.

Old Logo

In 2010, the MJAHL changed its name to the Maritime Junior Hockey League and unveiled a new logo.

In 2011, the Halifax Lions moved to Dartmouth and were renamed the Metro Marauders. Two years later the Marauders were renamed the Metro Shipbuilders for the 2012–13 season. That season was a disaster for the Shipbuilders, as they only recorded four wins in their 52-game schedule and averaged just 232 fans per game. The relocation rumours had them moving back to Halifax after three years in Dartmouth but they finally moved to Kentville and were renamed the Valley Wildcats. After one season in Kentville they moved to Berwick.

In 2014 the league approved an expansion team in St. Stephen named the County Aces. As a result of the expansion, the league was back up to 12 teams for the first time since the folding of the Charlottetown Abbies in April 2008.

In November 2014, the league took over the ownership of the Bridgewater Lumberjacks after owner Ken Petrie left the team because of financial trouble. The team was sold two weeks later to a local businessman and the team was renamed the South Shore Lumberjacks.

In November 2016, the Dieppe Commandos announced they would be moving to Edmundston, New Brunswick, after the 2016–17 season, and be renamed the Edmundston Blizzard.

In May 2018, the Woodstock Slammers applied for a leave of absence for the 2018–19 season; the team is later sold and relocated to Grand Falls, New Brunswick, and renamed the Grand Falls Rapids.

In April 2019, the St. Stephen Aces were sold to a group from Fredericton, New Brunswick, and became the third team in three years to relocate. The Aces relocated to Fredericton for the 2019–20 season and were renamed the Fredericton Red Wings.

The current MHL has twelve teams, six in each division. The league has hosted the Royal Bank Cup and Centennial Cup seven times, winning twice. MHL teams have also won seven Fred Page Cups as the Junior "A" Eastern Canadian champions to earn the right to compete for the Royal Bank Cup.

In September 2024, female goaltender Rhyah Stewart signed with the West Kent Steamers.

In 2025, the franchise formerly known as the Fredericton Red Wings relocated to Bathurst, New Brunswick, and was renamed the Chaleur Lightning.

== Teams ==
Map of MHL teams
North Division South Division

EastLink North Division
Team	Joined	Centre	Arena
Campbellton Tigers	1996	Campbellton, New Brunswick	Memorial Civic Center
Edmundston Blizzard	1983	Edmundston, New Brunswick	Jean-Daigle Centre
Chaleur Lightning	2025	Bathurst, New Brunswick	K. C. Irving Regional Centre
Grand Falls Rapids	2003	Grand Falls, New Brunswick	E. & P. Senechal Center
Miramichi Timberwolves	2000	Miramichi, New Brunswick	Miramichi Civic Centre
West Kent Steamers	2004	Bouctouche, New Brunswick	JK Irving Centre
EastLink South Division
Team	Joined	Centre	Arena
Amherst Ramblers	1967	Amherst, Nova Scotia	Amherst Stadium
Pictou County Crushers	1967	New Glasgow, Nova Scotia	Pictou County Wellness Centre
Summerside Western Capitals	1991	Summerside, Prince Edward Island	Consolidated Credit Union Place
Truro Bearcats	1997	Truro, Nova Scotia	Rath Eastlink Community Centre
Valley Wildcats	1986	Berwick, Nova Scotia	Kings Mutual Century Centre
Yarmouth Mariners	1976	Yarmouth, Nova Scotia	Mariners Centre

*relocated franchise

== League champions ==
From the 1970s until 1991, the Callaghan Cup was the Atlantic Junior A Championship of Canada. The winners of New Brunswick, Prince Edward Island, Nova Scotia, and Newfoundland would playdown for this trophy during the Dudley Hewitt Cup and Manitoba Centennial Cup playdowns.

In 1991, the Callaghan Cup became exclusive to the MJAHL. The Callaghan Cup was their championship trophy until after the 2006 playoffs, when it was replaced by the Kent Cup,

In the Kent Cup era the bold team indicates the Kent Cup winner.

Year	Champion	Runner Up	Series
Metro Valley Jr. B Champions
1968	Windsor Royals
1969	East Hants Penguins	Truro Bearcats
1970	Truro Bearcats	East Hants Penguins	4–3
1971	Truro Bearcats	East Hants Penguins	4–0
1972	Truro Bearcats
1973	New Glasgow Bombers	Halifax Blazers	4–0
1974	Truro Bearcats
1975	Dartmouth Arrows	Truro Bearcats	4–2
1976	Truro Bearcats	Dartmouth Arrows	4–3
Metro Valley Jr. A Champions
1977	Dartmouth Arrows
1978	Cole Harbour Colts
1979	Halifax Lions
1980	Cole Harbour Colts
1981	Cole Harbour Colts	Halifax Lions
1982	Halifax Lions
1983	Halifax Lions
1984	Halifax Lions
1985	Cole Harbour Colts	Halifax Lions
1986	Moncton Hawks	Cole Harbour Colts
1987	Dartmouth Fuel Kids
1988	Halifax Lions
1989	Moncton Hawks
1990	Amherst Ramblers	Halifax Dairy Queen Blizzard	4–0
1991	Halifax Jr. Canadians	Amherst Ramblers
Callaghan Cup Champions
1992	Halifax Mooseheads	Charlottetown Abbies	4–3
1993	Antigonish Bulldogs	Halifax Mooseheads	4–3
1994	Antigonish Bulldogs	Halifax Oland Exports	4–3
1995	Moncton Beavers	Amherst Ramblers	4–0
1996	Dartmouth Oland Exports	Moncton Beavers	4–2
1997	Summerside Western Capitals	Dartmouth Oland Exports
1998	Restigouche River Rats	Dartmouth Oland Exports
1999	Charlottetown Abbies	Antigonish Bulldogs	4–3
2000	Halifax Oland Exports	Summerside Western Capitals
2001	Antigonish Bulldogs	Charlottetown Abbies
2002	Halifax Oland Exports	Campbellton Tigers	4–1
2003	Charlottetown Abbies	Amherst Ramblers	4–1
2004	Campbellton Tigers	Yarmouth Mariners	4–1
2005	Truro Bearcats	Campbellton Tigers	4–1
2006	Woodstock Slammers	Amherst Ramblers	4–1
Year	Meek Champion	Eastlink Champion	Series
Kent Cup Champions
2007	Summerside Western Capitals	Truro Bearcats	2–4
2008	Woodstock Slammers	Yarmouth Mariners	2–4
2009	Summerside Western Capitals	Truro Bearcats	4–1
2010	Woodstock Slammers	Pictou County Crushers	4–1
2011	Summerside Western Capitals	Pictou County Crushers	4–0
2012	Woodstock Slammers	Yarmouth Mariners	4–3
2013	Summerside Western Capitals	Truro Bearcats	4–1
2014	Dieppe Commandos	Truro Bearcats	2–4
2015	Dieppe Commandos	Truro Bearcats	4–0
Year	Eastlink North Division Champion	Eastlink South Division Champion	Series
Kent Cup Champions
2016	Dieppe Commandos	Weeks Jr 'A' Crushers	2–4
2017	Miramichi Timberwolves	Truro Bearcats	3–4
2018	Edmundston Blizzard	Yarmouth Mariners	4–2
Canadian Tire Cup Champions
2019	Campbellton Tigers	Yarmouth Mariners	0–4
2020	Cancelled due to COVID-19 pandemic
2021	Cancelled due to COVID-19 pandemic
2022	Summerside Western Capitals	Truro Bearcats	4-1
Metalfab MHL Cup
2023	Edmundston Blizzard	Yarmouth Mariners	4-0
2024	Miramichi Timberwolves	Summerside Western Capitals	4-2
2025	Edmundston Blizzard	Pictou County Crushers	4-0
2026	Truro Bearcats	Edmundston Blizzard	4-1

== Cities/towns with the most league championships ==
Note: Those listed in yellow are currently home to an MHL franchise.

City/town	Province	Cups won	Championship teams	Years in league
Truro	Nova Scotia	10	Bearcats (original) (1970, 1971, 1972, 1974, 1976), Bearcats (current) (2005, 2007, 2014, 2017, 2026)	1968-1983, 1997–present
Halifax	Nova Scotia	9	Lions (1979, 1982, 1983, 1984, 1988), Jr. Canadians (1991), Mooseheads (1992), Oland Exports (2000, 2002)	1967-1995, 1998-2010
Summerside	Prince Edward Island	5	Western Capitals (1997, 2009, 2011, 2013, 2022)	1991–present
Cole Harbour	Nova Scotia	4	Colts (1978, 1980, 1981, 1985)	1976-1995
Dartmouth	Nova Scotia	4	Arrows (1975, 1977), Fuel Kids (1987), Oland Exports (1996)	1967-1992, 1995-1998, 2000–2002, 2010-2013
Antigonish	Nova Scotia	3	Bulldogs (1993, 1994, 2001)	1986-2008
Moncton	New Brunswick	3	Hawks (1986, 1989), Beavers (1995)	1983-2008
Woodstock	New Brunswick	3	Slammers (2006, 2010, 2012)	2003-2018
Yarmouth	Nova Scotia	3	Mariners (2008, 2019, 2023)	2002–present
Campbellton	New Brunswick	2	River Rats (1998), Tigers (2004)	1996–present
Charlottetown	Prince Edward Island	2	Abbies (1999, 2003)	1991-1994, 1995-2008
Edmundston	New Brunswick	2	Blizzard (2018, 2025)	2017–present
New Glasgow	Nova Scotia	2	Bombers (1973), Crushers (2016)	1972-76, 2004–present
Amherst	Nova Scotia	1	Ramblers (1990)	1968–present
Dieppe	New Brunswick	1	Commandos (2015)	2008-2017
East Hants	Nova Scotia	1	Penguins (1969)	1967-1977, 1995-2000
Miramichi	New Brunswick	1	Timberwolves (2024)	2000–present
Windsor	Nova Scotia	1	Royals (1968)	1967-1978

== Fred Page Cup Eastern Canadian Champions ==
All champions in this table are from the Maritime Junior Hockey League

Year	Champion	Runner Up	Host (if applicable)
1996	Moncton Beavers	Dartmouth Oland Exports	Dartmouth, Nova Scotia
1999	Charlottetown Abbies	Hawkesbury Hawks (CJHL)	Charlottetown, PEI
2002	Halifax Oland Exports	Ottawa Jr. Senators (CJHL)	Truro, Nova Scotia
2008	Pictou County Crushers	Pembroke Lumber Kings (CJHL)	New Glasgow, Nova Scotia
2009	Summerside Western Capitals	Dieppe Commandos	Moncton, New Brunswick
2012	Woodstock Slammers	Nepean Raiders (CCHL)	Kanata, Ontario
2013	Truro Bearcats	Summerside Western Capitals	Truro, Nova Scotia

=== Callaghan Cup MVJHL Champions ===
All champions in this table are from the Metro Valley Junior Hockey League against interleague opponents.

Year	Champion	Runner Up	Series
1981	Cole Harbour Colts	Sherwood-Parkdale Metros (IJHL)	4–2
1983	Halifax Lions	Sherwood-Parkdale Metros (IJHL)	4–1
1984	Halifax Lions	Summerside Western Capitals (IJHL)	4–1
1985	Cole Harbour Colts	Charlottetown Eagles (IJHL)	4–2
1986	Moncton Hawks	Summerside Western Capitals (IJHL)
1987	Dartmouth Fuel Kids	Charlottetown Abbies (IJHL)	4–1
1988	Halifax Lions	Summerside Western Capitals (IJHL)	4–3
1990	Amherst Ramblers	Charlottetown Abbies (IJHL)	4–1
1991	Halifax Canadians	St. John's Jr. 50's (SJJHL)	4–0

== Defunct teams ==
- Cape Breton Islanders/Glace Bay Miners
- Charlottetown Abbies
- Dartmouth Arrows/Eagles/Fuel Kids/Pepsis
- Fredericton Red Wings
- Kentville Colonels
- Saint John Alpines
- St. Stephen Aces
- Truro Bearcats (1977–1983) (Joined MJAHL again in 1997 with new franchise)
- Valley Wildcats (1980–1984) (Awarded new team after the relocation of the Metro Shipbuilders)
- Windsor Royals

== Timeline of teams in the MHL ==
Note: Current teams are shaded in dark blue. Gold stars denote league championships.

- 1967 – **Metro Valley Junior Hockey League is founded at Junior B level**
- 1967 – East Hants Junior Penguins, **Halifax Colonels**, Dartmouth Hoyts Arrows, Windsor Royals, Kentville Riteway Rangers, and **Berwick Shell Junior Bruins** are founding members of the league.
- 1968 – Kentville Riteway Rangers move to Truro and are renamed the Truro Bearcats
- 1968 – Berwick Shell Junior Bruins move to Amherst and are renamed the Amherst Ramblers
- 1969 – The Halifax Colonels become the Halifax Blazers sometime between the inaugural season and the 1972–73 season.
- 1972 – Chester Ravens enter league?
- 1972 – New Glasgow Bombers enter league
- 1972 – Pictou Maripacs enter league
- 1973 – Stellarton Spitfires join league
- 1974 – Kentville Colonels join league
- 1975 – Stellarton Spitfires leave league
- 1975 – Pictou Maripacs leave league
- 1975 – Halifax Blazers are renamed Halifax Centennials
- 1976 – **Cole Harbour Colts** join league
- 1976 – New Glasgow Bombers leave league
- **1977 – League is promoted to Junior A**
- 1977 – East Hantz Penguins leave league
- 1977 – Chester Ravens leave league but franchise is demoted to Jr. B in 1980
- 1977 – Halifax Centennials are renamed Halifax Lions
- 1978 – Windsor Royals expelled from league mid-season for short roster
- 1980 – Kentville Colonels leave league
- 1980 – Valley Wildcats join league
- 1983 – Truro Bearcats fold mid-season (November)
- 1983 – **Moncton Hawks** join league from New Brunswick Junior Hockey League
- 1984 – Valley Wildcats leave league
- 1986 – **Antigonish Bulldogs** join league
- 1987 – Dartmouth Arrows renamed Dartmouth Fuel Kids
- 1988 – Dartmouth Fuel Kids renamed Dartmouth Eagles
- 1989 – Dartmouth Eagles renamed Dartmouth Pepsis
- 1989 – Halifax Lions renamed Halifax DQ Blizzards
- 1990 – Moncton Hawks renamed Moncton Classics
- 1990 – Halifax DQ Blizzards renamed Halifax Canadians
- 1991 – **Metro Valley Junior Hockey League is renamed Maritime Junior A Hockey League**
- 1991 – Charlottetown Abbies join league from Island Junior Hockey League
- 1991 - **Summerside Western Capitals** join league from Island Junior Hockey League
- 1991 – Halifax Canadians renamed Halifax Mooseheads
- 1991 – Moncton Classics renamed Moncton-Dieppe Classics
- 1992 – Dartmouth Pepsis leave league
- 1993 – Moncton-Dieppe Classics become Moncton-Dieppe Beavers
- 1993 – Halifax Mooseheads renamed Halifax Oland Exports
- 1994 – Moncton-Dieppe Beavers renamed Moncton Beavers
- 1994 – Amherst Ramblers renamed Amherst Mooseheads
- 1994 – Charlottetown Abbies take one-year leave
- 1995 – Charlottetown Abbies return to league
- 1995 – Saint John Alpines join league
- 1995 – Halifax Oland Exports move to Dartmouth and are renamed Dartmouth Oland Exports
- 1995 – Cole Harbour Colts move to East Hants and are renamed East Hants Penguins
- 1996 – **Restigouche River Rats** join league
- 1996 – Cape Breton Islanders join league
- 1997 – Saint John Alpines fold mid-season (January)
- 1997 – **Truro Bearcats** join league
- 1997 – Cape Breton Islanders renamed Glace Bay Miners
- 1997 – Glace Bay Miners fold mid-season (December)
- 1998 – Dartmouth Oland Exports move to Halifax and are renamed Halifax Oland Exports
- 1998 – Amherst Mooseheads renamed Amherst Ramblers
- 1999 – Restigouche River Rats renamed Campbellton Tigers
- 2000 – **Miramichi Timberwolves** join league
- 2000 – East Hants Penguins move to Dartmouth and are renamed Dartmouth DQ Blizzard
- 2002 – Dartmouth DQ Blizzard move from Dartmouth and renamed Yarmouth Mariners
- 2003 – Halifax Oland Exports renamed Halifax Team Pepsi
- 2003 – **Woodstock Slammers** join league
- 2004 – Halifax Team Pepsi move from Halifax to New Glasgow and renamed Pictou County Weeks Crushers
- 2004 – **Halifax Wolverines** join league
- 2005 – Campbellton Tigers change their name to Restigouche Tigers
- 2008 – Charlottetown Abbies take one-year leave
- 2008 – Halifax Wolverines move from Halifax to Bridgewater and are renamed Bridgewater Lumberjacks
- 2008 – Antigonish Bulldogs move from Antigonish to Halifax and are renamed Halifax Lions
- 2008 – Moncton Beavers move from Moncton to Dieppe and are renamed Dieppe Commandos
- 2009 – Restigouche Tigers renamed Campbellton Tigers
- 2009 – Charlottetown Abbies fail to return to league
- 2010 – Halifax Lions move from Halifax to Dartmouth and are renamed Metro Marauders (Dartmouth)
- **2010 – Maritime Junior A Hockey League changes their name to Maritime Junior Hockey League**
- 2012 – Metro Marauders renamed the Metro Shipbuilders
- 2013 – Metro Shipbuilders move from Dartmouth to Kentville and renamed the Valley Wildcats.
- 2014 – Valley Wildcats move from Kentville to Berwick
- 2014 – **County Aces** joined league
- 2014 – Bridgewater Lumberjacks renamed South Shore Lumberjacks
- 2017 – Dieppe Commandos move from Dieppe to Edmundston and are renamed Edmundston Blizzard
- 2018 – Woodstock Slammers request "leave of absence". Franchise instead re-located to Grand Falls, NB and were renamed the Rapids
- 2019 – St. Stephen Aces move from St. Stephen to Fredericton and are renamed the Fredericton Red Wings
- 2023 – South Shore Lumberjacks move from Bridgewater to Bouctouche and are renamed the West Kent Steamers
- 2025 – Fredericton Red Wings relocated to Bathurst and were renamed the Chaleur Lightning

Bolded teams indicate the original names of active franchises.
