= Campbellton Tigers =

- City: Campbellton, New Brunswick, Canada
- League: Maritime Junior Hockey League
- Division: North
- Founded: 1996 (Restigouche River Rats)
- Home arena: Memorial Civic Center
- Colours: Black, gold, and white
- Owners: Mark Catroppa, Pierre Girard
- President: Michael O’Toole
- General manager: Charles LeBlanc
- Head coach: Charles LeBlanc (2025)

Franchise history
- 1996-1999: Restigouche River Rats
- 1999-2005: Campbellton Tigers
- 2005-2009: Restigouche Tigers
- 2009-Present: Campbellton Tigers

The Campbellton Tigers are a Junior "A" ice hockey team based in Campbellton, New Brunswick. They play in the Maritime Junior Hockey League. The team plays their home games at the Memorial Civic Center.

Originally founded in 1996 as the Restigouche River Rats the team was renamed Campbellton Tigers two years later to reflect the city they play in. In 2005 the team returned to using Restigouche as their city name to reflect the county they play in before making the switch back to Campbellton three years later. They have played in Campbellton at the Memorial Civic Center since their inception in 1996.

The Tigers have won league championships in 1998 and 2004.

== Season-by-Season Record ==
Season	GP	W	L	T	OTL	GF	GA	P	Results	Playoffs
1996-97	56	20	33	2	1	240	299	43	9th MJAHL	
1997-98	52	33	14	4	1	288	205	71	2nd MJAHL	Won League
1998-99	48	20	27	1	-	204	235	43	6th MJAHL	
1999-00	52	37	13	1	1	285	192	76	2nd MJAHL	
2000-01	52	30	13	3	6	259	201	69	3rd MJAHL	
2001-02	52	35	12	4	1	265	172	75	2nd MJAHL	
2002-03	52	24	24	3	1	215	212	52	6th MJAHL	
2003-04	52	22	22	4	4	219	204	52	5th MJAHL	Won League
2004-05	56	29	15	9	3	237	182	70	3rd MJAHL	
2005-06	56	30	21	0	5	216	211	65	6th MJAHL	Lost in Division Semi-finals
2006-07	58	26	28	0	4	165	205	56	8th MJAHL	Lost in Division Semi-finals
2007-08	58	16	36	-	6	173	213	38	11th MJAHL	
2008-09	53	6	44	-	3	97	287	15	11th MJAHL	
2009-10	49	6	38	-	5	125	261	17	11th MJAHL	DNQ
2010-11	52	11	35	-	6	146	262	28	10th MHL	Lost Quarter-final
2011-12	52	17	31	-	4	153	208	38	9th MHL	Lost Quarter-final
2012-13	52	12	36	-	4	137	224	28	9th MHL	DNQ
2013-14	52	10	40	-	2	112	246	22	10th MHL	DNQ
2014-15	48	25	18	-	5	140	139	55	7th MHL	Lost Quarter-final
2015-16	48	23	17	7	2	152	143	55	4th of 6 North; 7th of 12 MHL	Lost Div. Semifinal 3-4 (Western Capitals)
2016-17	48	13	32	1	2	129	190	29	6th of 6 North; 12th of 12 MHL	Did not qualify
2017-18	50	24	22	2	2	134	158	52	3rd of 6 North; 7th of 12 MHL	
2018-19	50	31	13	2	4	183	127	68	2nd of 6 North; 4th of 12 MHL	Won Div. Semifinal 4-0 (Blizzard); Won Div. Semifinal 4-2 (Western Capitals); Lost Finals 0-4 (Mariners)
2019-20	52	29	18	3	2	202	165	63	3rd of 6 North; 4th of 12 MHL	Playoffs cancelled due to covid
2020-21	27	15	11	0	1	92	75	31	Season cancelled due to covid	
2021-22	36	23	8	4	1	156	127	51	2nd of 6 North; 3rd of 12 MHL	Lost Div. Semifinal 2-4 (Red Wings)
2022-23	52	27	17	5	3	227	201	62	3rd of 6 North; 5th of 12 MHL	Lost Div. Semifinal 3-4 (Western Capitals)
2023-24	52	18	32	2	0	175	229	38	5th of 6 North; 10th of 12 MHL	Did not qualify
2024-25	52	27	19	4	2	192	183	60	4th of 6 North; 5th of 12 MHL	Won Div Semifinals 4-2 (Steamers); Lost Div Finals 0-4 (Blizzard)
2025-26	52	15	29	6	2	171	250	38	5th of 6 North; 10th of 12 MHL	Did not qualify

== 2025-26 Collapse ==
By late December 2025, the Tigers were 15-11-3-1, and sitting comfortably in a playoff spot in the EastLink North Division. However, after losing by only one goal, a 4-3 overtime loss to the West Kent Steamers on December 17, Campbellton fired Head Coach Darick Ste.-Marie. General Manager and Assistant Coach Charles LeBlanc, was instated as the interim Head Coach. This decision came just hours before their game on December 19, against the Grand Falls Rapids. The Tigers would loss to Grand Falls, 5-0, surrendering two powerplay goals in the process. Campbellton's last win, came on December 14, 2025, against the Chaleur Lighting; a 4-3 win on overtime, thanks to Victor Lanoue, who tied the game in the third period, and scored the overtime winner. With Charles LeBlanc as the Head Coach, as of March 7, 2026, the Tigers have lost 22 straight games, going 0-18-3-1, and have been outscored 131 to 66. The Tigers did come close to ending their losing streak 4 times, losing to West Kent 3-2 in a shootout on January 16, 6-5 to Grand Falls in overtime on January 21, and 5-4 against Chaleur on February 1. Their most recent one, came against the Miramichi Timberwolves on February 20: trailing 4-2 going into the third period, Liam Duquette scored two goals for Campbellton; his second of the period, came with three minutes and twenty-seven seconds left, before losing 5-4 in overtime.

However, despite the losing streak, many Campbellton players have enjoyed statistical success; as Nathan Rhodes, captain Logan Mallaley, defenseman Luke Orr, and Adam Véronneau, have all set career highs in goals, assists, and points. Nathan Rhodes came from Grand Falls in a trade on August 1; he went from 8 goals, 7 assists, 15 points in 46 games in 2024-25, to 17 goals, 31 assists, and 48 points in 51 games played. Logan Mallaley has 14 goals and 18 assists for and 32 points, tied for 5th on the team in points with Alexi Parent. Luke Orr, a 5'9" defenceman but has great speed on the backend, has totalled 24 points (8 goals, 16 assists); nearly doubling his career high in points from 2024–25, spending time with the Amherst Ramblers and Miramichi Timberwolves. Alexi Parent came over in trade from the Valley Wildcats after spending five games with them and recorded one point; with the Tigers, in 44, scored 15 goals, notched 21 assists for 36 points. Adam Véronneau, who spent limited time with the West Kent Steamers in 2024-25, showed his goal-scoring prowess with Campellton, potting 27 goals and 46 points.

Logo Prior to 2015

== See also ==
- List of ice hockey teams in New Brunswick
- Maritime Junior A Hockey League
