= Vladislav Gavrikov =

Russian ice hockey player (born 1995)

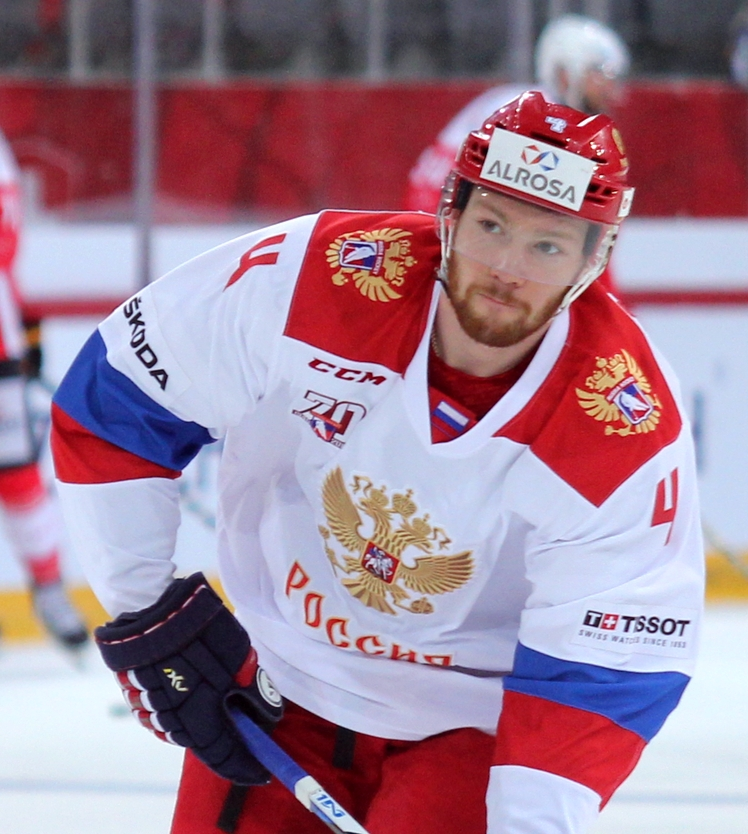
- Gavrikov with Russia in 2017
- Born: 21 November 1995 (age 30) Yaroslavl, Russia
- Height: 6 ft 3 in (191 cm)
- Weight: 214 lb (97 kg; 15 st 4 lb)
- Position: Defence
- Shoots: Left
- NHL team Former teams: New York Rangers; Lokomotiv Yaroslavl; SKA Saint Petersburg; Columbus Blue Jackets; Los Angeles Kings
- National team: Russia
- NHL draft: 159th overall, 2015; Columbus Blue Jackets
- Playing career: 2014–present

Vladislav Andreyevich Gavrikov (Russian: Владислав Андреевич Гавриков; born 21 November 1995) is a Russian professional ice hockey player who is a defenceman for the New York Rangers of the National Hockey League (NHL). He was drafted 159th overall by the Columbus Blue Jackets in the 2015 NHL entry draft.

== Playing career ==
Gavrikov made his Kontinental Hockey League (KHL) debut with Lokomotiv Yaroslavl during the 2014–15 season.

With his development steadily progressing during his four senior years with Lokomotiv, his KHL rights were traded to powerhouse club SKA Saint Petersburg following the 2016–17 season. With the Columbus Blue Jackets hopeful of signing the Russian, he was earlier offered a contract and invited by the Blue Jackets to a tour of Columbus, Ohio. Despite his arrival on 27 June 2017, Gavrikov told the Blue Jackets that he had agreed to a two-year contract to remain in Russia with SKA.

In the 2018–19 season, Gavrikov scored a career-high 20 points in 60 games with SKA. Following a second consecutive conference final defeat to CSKA Moscow, Gavrikov was released from his expiring contract to sign a two-year, entry-level contract with the Columbus Blue Jackets on 13 April 2019.

Gavrikov scored his first career NHL goal on 15 November 2019. The goal was scored on goaltender Jake Allen and the St. Louis Blues. Gavrikov finished his rookie regular season with 18 points in 69 games. Gavrikov would score his first career NHL playoff goal during the 2020 Stanley Cup playoffs against the Toronto Maple Leafs. He would finish the playoffs with three points in 10 games.

On 5 November 2020, Gavrikov signed a three-year, $8.4 million contract extension with the Blue Jackets.

On 1 March 2023, he was traded to the Los Angeles Kings along with Joonas Korpisalo for goaltender Jonathan Quick and two draft picks. He scored his first goal as a King on 6 March 2023 against the Washington Capitals.

On 7 June 2023, Gavrikov opted to forgo free agency and was signed a two-year contract extension to remain with the Kings with an annual value of $5.875 million.

After becoming a free agent on 1 July 2025, Gavrikov signed a seven-year deal with the New York Rangers worth $49 million, with an annual value of $7 million.

On 14 March 2026, Gavrikov recorded his first NHL career three-point game, tallying one goal and two assists in the Rangers' 4–2 win over the Minnesota Wild.

== International play ==
Medal record

Ice hockey

Representing Olympic Athletes from Russia

Olympic Games
Gold medal – first place	2018 Pyeongchang	

Representing Russia

World Championships
Bronze medal – third place	2017 Germany/France	
Bronze medal – third place	2019 Slovakia	

World Junior Championships
Silver medal – second place	2015 Canada	

Gavrikov has represented Russia in international play at the World Under-17 Challenge, World Under-18 Championships, World Junior Championships, Senior World Championships and Olympic Games. He was a member of the Olympic Athletes from Russia team at the 2018 Winter Olympics, where he won the gold medal.

== Career statistics ==
=== Regular season and playoffs ===
			Regular season					Playoffs
Season	Team	League	GP	G	A	Pts	PIM	GP	G	A	Pts	PIM
2011–12	Loko Yaroslavl	RUS U17	17	6	5	11	16	—	—	—	—	—
2011–12	Loko Yaroslavl	MHL	8	1	1	2	4	2	0	0	0	0
2012–13	Loko Yaroslavl	MHL	47	3	3	6	18	—	—	—	—	—
2013–14	Loko Yaroslavl	MHL	45	3	9	12	28	7	0	2	2	4
2014–15	Loko Yaroslavl	MHL	16	1	6	7	16	5	0	0	0	2
2014–15	Lokomotiv Yaroslavl	KHL	16	0	1	1	4	4	0	0	0	0
2014–15	HC Ryazan	VHL	11	1	2	3	4	—	—	—	—	—
2015–16	Lokomotiv Yaroslavl	KHL	42	3	4	7	18	5	1	0	1	2
2016–17	Lokomotiv Yaroslavl	KHL	54	3	4	7	38	15	1	4	5	14
2017–18	SKA Saint Petersburg	KHL	50	5	9	14	26	15	1	4	5	2
2018–19	SKA Saint Petersburg	KHL	60	5	15	20	10	18	1	0	1	0
2018–19	Columbus Blue Jackets	NHL	—	—	—	—	—	2	0	0	0	0
2019–20	Columbus Blue Jackets	NHL	69	5	13	18	18	10	1	2	3	6
2020–21	Columbus Blue Jackets	NHL	55	2	10	12	14	—	—	—	—	—
2021–22	Columbus Blue Jackets	NHL	80	5	28	33	68	—	—	—	—	—
2022–23	Columbus Blue Jackets	NHL	52	3	7	10	30	—	—	—	—	—
2022–23	Los Angeles Kings	NHL	20	3	6	9	8	6	0	1	1	0
2023–24	Los Angeles Kings	NHL	77	6	17	23	28	5	0	2	2	2
2024–25	Los Angeles Kings	NHL	82	5	25	30	28	6	0	2	2	2
2025–26	New York Rangers	NHL	82	14	21	35	50	—	—	—	—	—
KHL totals			222	16	33	49	96	57	4	8	12	18
NHL totals			517	43	127	170	244	29	1	7	8	10

=== International ===
Year	Team	Event	Result	GP	G	A	Pts	PIM
2012	Russia	U17	1st place, gold medalist(s)	5	1	1	2	0
2012	Russia	IH18	5th	3	1	0	1	0
2013	Russia	WJC18	4th	7	0	0	0	27
2015	Russia	WJC	2nd place, silver medalist(s)	7	0	0	0	0
2017	Russia	WC	3rd place, bronze medalist(s)	9	1	1	2	2
2018	OAR	OG	1st place, gold medalist(s)	6	2	1	3	6
2018	Russia	WC	6th	8	0	1	1	2
2019	Russia	WC	3rd place, bronze medalist(s)	10	0	0	0	4
2021	ROC	WC	5th	8	0	2	2	0
Junior totals				22	2	1	3	27
Senior totals				41	3	5	8	14
