= Ice hockey at the 2018 Winter Olympics – Men's tournament =

2018 Winter Olympics

Tournament details
- Host country: South Korea
- Venues: 2 (in 1 host city)
- Dates: 14–25 February 2018
- Teams: 12

Final positions
- Champions: Olympic Athletes from Russia (1st title)
- Runners-up: Germany
- Third place: Canada
- Fourth place: Czech Republic

Tournament statistics
- Games played: 30
- Goals scored: 154 (5.13 per game)
- Attendance: 138,327 (4,611 per game)
- Scoring leader: Nikita Gusev (12 points)

Awards
- MVP: Ilya Kovalchuk

The men's tournament in ice hockey at the 2018 Winter Olympics was held in Gangneung, South Korea between 14 and 25 February 2018. Twelve countries qualified for the tournament; eight of them did so automatically by virtue of their ranking by the International Ice Hockey Federation, one, South Korea, automatically qualified as hosts, while the three others took part in a qualification tournament.

After five consecutive Olympic tournaments in which the National Hockey League (the world's premier professional league) allowed its players to participate in the Olympics and adjusted its schedule to accommodate the tournament, the NHL announced in 2017 that it would prohibit any player under NHL contract, including those not actually playing for an NHL team, from participating in the Olympics. The NHL secured the cooperation of the International Ice Hockey Federation and the IOC ensuring that nations would not be allowed to ask NHL players to participate.

Unlike the NHL, the vast majority of European leagues accommodated an Olympic break, headlined by Russia-based KHL's 33-day break, Sweden-based Swedish Hockey League's 14-day break, Switzerland-based National League's 25-day break, German-based Eishockey Liga's 26-day break, Czech Republic–based Extraliga's 18-day break, and Slovakia-based Tipsport liga's 14-day break. Conversely, Finland-based SM-liiga did not accommodate a break, but allowed its top players to leave the clubs and participate in the Olympic Games.

The Russian national team, competing under the name of the Olympic Athletes from Russia (OAR), won the gold medal, defeating the German national team with a score of 4–3 in overtime in the final. This was the ninth Olympic gold medal for the Soviet/Russian team. For Germany, the silver medal was the highest achievement in the history of German ice hockey and their first medal since the 1976 Winter Olympics in Innsbruck, when West Germany won the bronze medal.

Defending champion Canada secured third place and bronze, defeating Czech Republic 6–4 in the bronze medal game.

== Venue ==
Gangneung Hockey Centre Capacity: 10.000	Kwandong Hockey Centre Capacity: 6.000
Beijing National Indoor Stadium	Cadillac Arena
(South Korea) Gangneung	(South Korea) Gangneung

== Qualification ==
Canada, Russia, Sweden, Finland, United States, Czech Republic, Switzerland, and Slovakia qualified as the top eight teams in the IIHF World Ranking in 2015.

South Korea qualified as host team. To field a competitive team, the South Korean government agreed to grant one American and six Canadian hockey players that were playing in Korean leagues dual citizenship to make them eligible for the national team. The remaining three teams qualified from qualification tournaments.

=== Qualified teams ===
Event	Date	Location	Vacancies	Qualified
Hosts	19 September 2014	(Spain) Tenerife	1	South Korea
2015 IIHF World Ranking	2 April 2012 – 17 May 2015	(Czech Republic) Prague and Ostrava	8	Canada; Russia; Sweden; Finland; United States; Czech Republic; Switzerland; Slovakia
Final qualification tournament	1–4 September 2016	(Belarus) Minsk	1	Slovenia
Final qualification tournament	1–4 September 2016	(Latvia) Riga	1	Germany
Final qualification tournament	1–4 September 2016	(Norway) Oslo	1	Norway
Total			12	

Notes

1. ^{a} 2015 IIHF World Ranking were comprising the following events: 2012 World Championship, 2013 World Championship, 2014 Winter Olympic Games, 2014 World Championship and 2015 World Championship
2. ^{b} Prague and Ostrava were the sites for 2015 IIHF World Championship; at the conclusion of the tournament the ranking were finalized with regards to the qualification slots.
3. ^{c} In December 2017, the IOC suspended Russia from competing at the Winter Olympics as part of its sanctions following state-sponsored doping scandal. Russian athletes deemed clean were permitted to compete as Olympic Athletes from Russia.

== Officials ==
14 referees and 14 linesmen were selected for the tournament.

Referees

- (Canada) Oliver Gouin
- (Canada) Brett Iverson
- (Czech Republic) Jan Hribik
- (Czech Republic) Antonín Jeřábek
- (Finland) Aleksi Rantala
- (Finland) Anssi Salonen
- (Russia) Roman Gofman
- (Russia) Konstantin Olenin
- (Switzerland) Daniel Stricker
- (Switzerland) Tobias Wehrli
- (Slovakia) Jozef Kubuš
- (Sweden) Linus Öhlund
- (United States) Mark Lemelin
- (United States) Timothy Mayer

Linesmen

- (Canada) Nathan Vanoosten
- (Czech Republic) Vít Lederer
- (Czech Republic) Miroslav Lhotský
- (Finland) Hannu Sormunen
- (Finland) Sakari Suominen
- (Germany) Lukas Kohlmüller
- (Russia) Gleb Lazarev
- (Russia) Alexander Otmakhov
- (Switzerland) Nicolas Fluri
- (Switzerland) Roman Kaderli
- (Sweden) Jimmy Dahmen
- (Sweden) Henrik Pihlblad
- (United States) Fraser McIntyre
- (United States) Judson Ritter

== Preliminary round ==
All times are local (UTC+9).

=== Tiebreak criteria ===
In each group, teams were ranked according to the following criteria:

1. Number of points (three points for a regulation-time win, two points for an overtime or shootout win, one point for an overtime or shootout defeat, no points for a regulation-time defeat);
2. In case two teams were tied on points, the result of their head-to-head game determined the ranking;
3. In case three or four teams were tied on points, the following criteria applied (if, after applying a criterion, only two teams remained tied, the result of their head-to-head game determined their ranking):
  1. Points obtained in head-to-head games between the teams concerned;
  2. Goal differential in head-to-head games between the teams concerned;
  3. Number of goals scored in head-to-head games between the teams concerned;
  4. If three teams remained tied, result of head-to-head games between each of the teams concerned and the remaining team in the group (points, goal difference, goals scored);
  5. Pre-tournament seeding, which is the 2015 IIHF World Ranking.

=== Group A ===
Pos	Team	Pld	W	OTW	OTL	L	GF	GA	GD	Pts	Qualification
1	Czech Republic	3	2	1	0	0	9	4	+5	8	Quarterfinals
2	Canada	3	2	0	1	0	11	4	+7	7	Quarterfinals
3	Switzerland	3	1	0	0	2	10	9	+1	3	Qualification playoffs
4	South Korea (H)	3	0	0	0	3	1	14	−13	0	Qualification playoffs

Source: IIHF
(H) Host

15 February 2018; 21:10	Czech Republic	2–1 (2–1, 0–0, 0–0)	South Korea	Gangneung Hockey Centre, Pyeongchang; Attendance: 6,025

Game reference

Pavel Francouz
Goalies
Matt Dalton
Referees:
(United States) Mark Lemelin
(Sweden) Linus Öhlund
Linesmen:
(Sweden) Henrik Pihlblad
(Finland) Sakari Suominen

	0–1	07:34 – Cho M.H. (Radunske, Swift)
Kovář (Řepík, Sekáč) (PP) – 11:59	1–1
Řepík (Birner, Francouz) (SH) – 16:18	2–1

8 min
Penalties
6 min
40
Shots
18

15 February 2018; 21:10	Switzerland	1–5 (0–2, 0–2, 1–1)	Canada	Kwandong Hockey Centre, Gangneung; Attendance: 2,802

Game reference

Leonardo Genoni
Jonas Hiller
Goalies
Ben Scrivens
Referees:
(Czech Republic) Antonín Jeřábek
(Russia) Konstantin Olenin
Linesmen:
(Sweden) Jimmy Dahmen
(Russia) Alexander Otmakhov

	0–1	02:57 – Bourque (Lee, Roy)
	0–2	07:30 – Noreau (Lee, Roy) (PP)
	0–3	25:00 – Bourque (Roy) (PP)
	0–4	25:52 – Wolski (Noreau)
Moser (Rüfenacht, Ambühl) (PP, EA) – 47:33	1–4
	1–5	54:53 – Wolski (Kelly, Ebbett) (ENG)

6 min
Penalties
6 min
29
Shots
28

17 February 2018; 12:10	Canada	2–3 GWS (2–1, 0–1, 0–0) (OT: 0–0) (SO: 0–1)	Czech Republic	Gangneung Hockey Centre, Gangneung; Attendance: 6,731

Game reference

Ben Scrivens
Goalies
Pavel Francouz
Referees:
(Russia) Roman Gofman
(Finland) Anssi Salonen
Linesmen:
(Russia) Gleb Lazarov
(United States) Judson Ritter

Raymond (Vey, Gragnani) (PP) – 01:13	1–0
	1–1	06:52 – Kubalík
Bourque (Noreau, Brulé) (PP) – 13:30	2–1
	2–2	20:25 – Jordán (Birner, Horák)

Lapierre (miss)
Wolski
Roy (miss)
Bourque (miss)
Noreau (miss)
Shootout
(miss) Růžička
Koukal
Kovář
(miss) Červenka
6 min
Penalties
10 min
33
Shots
21

17 February 2018; 16:40	South Korea	0–8 (0–1, 0–2, 0–5)	Switzerland	Gangneung Hockey Centre, Pyeongchang; Attendance: 6,568

Game reference

Matt Dalton
Park Sung-je
Goalies
Jonas Hiller
Referees:
(Czech Republic) Jan Hribik
(Finland) Aleksi Rantala
Linesmen:
(Czech Republic) Miroslav Lhotský
(United States) Fraser McIntyre

0–1	10:23 – Hollenstein (Haas, Loeffel)
0–2	27:36 – Du Bois
0–3	35:55 – Suter (Herzog)
0–4	43:50 – Rüfenacht (Untersander, Almond)
0–5	45:17 – Suter (Ambühl, Moser)
0–6	46:45 – Schäppi (Almond, Geering)
0–7	51:24 – Suter (Geering, Ambühl)
0–8	55:10 – Corvi (Hofmann, Du Bois)

8 min
Penalties
10 min
25
Shots
34

18 February 2018; 16:40	Czech Republic	4–1 (1–1, 0–0, 3–0)	Switzerland	Gangneung Hockey Centre, Pyeongchang; Attendance: 6,137

Game reference

Pavel Francouz
Goalies
Jonas Hiller
Referees:
(Canada) Brett Iverson
(Russia) Konstantin Olenin
Linesmen:
(United States) Judson Ritter
(Canada) Nathan Vanoosten

Řepík (Erat, Horák) (PP) – 07:09	1–0
	1–1	14:47 – Rüfenacht (Ambühl, Suter)
Kubalík (Kovář, Kolář) – 43:02	2–1
Červenka (Kolář) (ENG) – 58:40	3–1
Řepík (Birner, Nakládal) (ENG) – 59:11	4–1

10 min
Penalties
2 min
28
Shots
29

18 February 2018; 21:10	Canada	4–0 (1–0, 1–0, 2–0)	South Korea	Gangneung Hockey Centre, Gangneung; Attendance: 6,038

Game reference

Kevin Poulin
Goalies
Matt Dalton
Referees:
(Slovakia) Jozef Kubuš
(Switzerland) Daniel Stricker
Linesmen:
(Switzerland) Nicolas Fluri
(Czech Republic) Vít Lederer

Thomas (Genoway, Wolski) – 07:36	1–0
O'Dell (Gragnani, Noreau) – 34:22	2–0
Lapierre (Roy) – 45:43	3–0
Brulé (Lee, Roy) (PP) – 58:02	4–0

8 min
Penalties
8 min
49
Shots
19

=== Group B ===
Pos	Team	Pld	W	OTW	OTL	L	GF	GA	GD	Pts	Qualification
1	Olympic Athletes from Russia	3	2	0	0	1	14	5	+9	6	Quarterfinals
2	Slovenia	3	0	2	0	1	8	12	−4	4 (Note: Slovenia 4 Pts; USA 4 Pts; Slovakia 1 Pts. Slovenia defeated USA 3–2 in overtime.)	Qualification playoffs
3	United States	3	1	0	1	1	4	8	−4	4	Qualification playoffs
4	Slovakia	3	1	0	1	1	6	7	−1	4	Qualification playoffs

Source: IIHF
Notes:

14 February 2018; 21:10	Slovakia	3–2 (2–2, 0–0, 1–0)	Olympic Athletes from Russia	Gangneung Hockey Centre, Pyeongchang; Attendance: 4,025

Game reference

Branislav Konrád
Goalies
Vasily Koshechkin
Referees:
(Canada) Brett Iverson
(Finland) Aleksi Rantala
Linesmen:
(Czech Republic) Vít Lederer
(Canada) Nathan Vanoosten

	0–1	02:54 – Gavrikov (Voinov, Shirokov)
	0–2	04:08 – Kaprizov (Gusev, Gavrikov)
Ölvecký (Graňák) – 16:05	1–2
Bakoš – 17:55	2–2
Čerešňák (Haščák, Bakoš) (PP) – 48:30	3–2

12 min
Penalties
10 min
19
Shots
22

14 February 2018; 21:10	United States	2–3 OT (1–0, 1–0, 0–2) (OT 0–1)	Slovenia	Kwandong Hockey Centre, Pyeongchang; Attendance: 3,348

Game reference

Ryan Zapolski
Goalies
Gašper Krošelj
Referees:
(Czech Republic) Jan Hribik
(Finland) Anssi Salonen
Linesmen:
(Switzerland) Roman Kaderli
(Germany) Lukas Kohlmüller

O'Neill (Roe, Donato) – 17:44	1–0
Greenway (O'Neill, Sanguinetti) – 32:57	2–0
	2–1	45:49 – Urbas (Gregorc, Vidmar)
	2–2	58:23 – Muršak (Gregorc, Verlič)
	2–3	60:38 – Muršak (Tičar, Urbas)

6 min
Penalties
6 min
36
Shots
25

16 February 2018; 12:10	United States	2–1 (1–1, 0–0, 1–0)	Slovakia	Gangneung Hockey Centre, Pyeongchang; Attendance: 5,652

Game reference

Ryan Zapolski
Goalies
Ján Laco
Referees:
(Canada) Olivier Gouin
(Switzerland) Tobias Wehrli
Linesmen:
(Switzerland) Nicolas Fluri
(Russia) Alexander Otmakhov

Donato (Terry, Bourque) (PP) – 07:10	1–0
	1–1	07:35 – Kudrna (Surový, Čajkovský)
Donato (Arcobello, Bourque) (PP) – 42:51	2–1

4 min
Penalties
10 min
31
Shots
22

16 February 2018; 16:40	Olympic Athletes from Russia	8–2 (2–0, 4–1, 2–1)	Slovenia	Gangneung Hockey Centre, Pyeongchang; Attendance: 6,018

Game reference

Vasily Koshechkin
Ilya Sorokin
Goalies
Luka Gračnar
Referees:
(United States) Mark Lemelin
(Switzerland) Daniel Stricker
Linesmen:
(Germany) Lukas Kohlmüller
(Finland) Hannu Sormunen

Mozyakin (Datsyuk, Gusev) (PP) – 18:23	1–0
Kovalchuk (Yakovlev, Andronov) – 18:45	2–0
Barabanov (Grigorenko, Kalinin) (PP) – 26:00	3–0
Kablukov (Kovalchuk, Zub) – 28:48	4–0
Kaprizov (Gusev, Kiselevich) – 30:02	5–0
	5–1	33:31 – Muršak (Verlič, Kuralt)
Kovalchuk (Kalinin, Andronov) – 37:16	6–1
Kaprizov (Datsyuk, Kiselevich) – 41:15	7–1
Kaprizov (Zub, Gusev) – 47:12	8–1
	8–2	59:27 – Pance

8 min
Penalties
6 min
34
Shots
15

17 February 2018; 21:10	Olympic Athletes from Russia	4–0 (1–0, 2–0, 1–0)	United States	Gangneung Hockey Centre, Pyeongchang; Attendance: 6,473

Game reference

Vasily Koshechkin
Goalies
Ryan Zapolski
Referees:
(Slovakia) Jozef Kubuš
(Sweden) Linus Öhlund
Linesmen:
(Czech Republic) Vít Lederer
(Switzerland) Nicolas Fluri

Prokhorkin (Mozyakin, Barabanov) – 07:21	1–0
Prokhorkin (Shirokov, Mozyakin) – 22:14	2–0
Kovalchuk (Andronov) – 39:59	3–0
Kovalchuk (Voynov, Andronov) – 40:28	4–0

10 min
Penalties
10 min
26
Shots
29

17 February 2018; 21:10	Slovenia	3–2 GWS (0–0, 2–1, 0–1) (OT: 0–0) (SO: 1–0)	Slovakia	Kwandong Hockey Centre, Pyeongchang; Attendance: 4,085

Game reference

Gašper Krošelj
Goalies
Branislav Konrád
Referees:
(Czech Republic) Antonín Jeřábek
(United States) Timothy Mayer
Linesmen:
(Finland) Hannu Sormunen
(Finland) Sakari Suominen

Gregorc (Muršak, Kuralt) (PP) – 21:00	1–0
Kuralt (Muršak, Gregorc) (PP) – 24:16	2–0
	2–1	35:43 – Bubela (Čerešňák, Graňák) (PP)
	2–2	45:56 – Haščák (Graňák, Čerešňák)

Tičar
Urbas (miss)
Muršak (miss)
Sabolič (miss)
Jeglič
Shootout
(miss) Kudrna
(miss) Ölvecký
(miss) Bakoš
Nagy
(miss) Haščák
4 min
Penalties
8 min
30
Shots
25

=== Group C ===
Pos	Team	Pld	W	OTW	OTL	L	GF	GA	GD	Pts	Qualification
1	Sweden	3	3	0	0	0	8	1	+7	9	Quarterfinals
2	Finland	3	2	0	0	1	11	6	+5	6	Qualification playoffs
3	Germany	3	0	1	0	2	4	7	−3	2	Qualification playoffs
4	Norway	3	0	0	1	2	2	11	−9	1	Qualification playoffs

Source: IIHF

15 February 2018; 12:10	Finland	5–2 (2–1, 2–0, 1–1)	Germany	Gangneung Hockey Centre, Gangneung; Attendance: 3,695

Game reference

Mikko Koskinen
Goalies
Danny aus den Birken
Referees:
(Canada) Oliver Gouin
(Slovakia) Jozef Kubuš
Linesmen:
(Switzerland) Nicolas Fluri
(Czech Republic) Miroslav Lhotský

Lepistö (Kontiola, Tolvanen) (PP) – 03:13	1–0
	1–1	08:44 – Macek (Ehrhoff, Wolf) (PP)
Pyörälä (Lajunen, Manninen) – 15:30	2–1
Tolvanen (Hartikainen, Kemppainen) (PP) – 37:22	3–1
Kukkonen (Kontiola, Tolvanen) – 38:43	4–1
	4–2	41:51 – Hördler
Kemppainen (Tolvanen, Lepistö) (PP) – 52:48	5–2

10 min
Penalties
10 min
20
Shots
24

15 February 2018; 16:40	Norway	0–4 (0–2, 0–0, 0–2)	Sweden	Gangneung Hockey Centre, Gangneung; Attendance: 3,961

Game reference

Lars Haugen
Goalies
Viktor Fasth
Referees:
(Russia) Roman Gofman
(Switzerland) Tobias Wehrli
Linesmen:
(Russia) Gleb Lazarev
(United States) Judson Ritter

0–1	05:29 – Lindholm (Omark, Möller)
0–2	16:46 – Lander (Bertilsson)
0–3	48:42 – Everberg (Omark, Fransson)
0–4	49:04 – Wikstrand (Omark, Everberg)

14 min
Penalties
12 min
17
Shots
27

16 February 2018; 21:10	Finland	5–1 (1–1, 1–0, 3–0)	Norway	Gangneung Hockey Centre, Gangneung; Attendance: 4,180

Game reference

Mikko Koskinen
Goalies
Lars Haugen
Referees:
(Czech Republic) Jan Hribik
(Canada) Brett Iverson
Linesmen:
(Sweden) Jimmy Dahmen
(United States) Fraser McIntyre

	0–1	06:29 – P. Thoresen (Kristiansen, K.A. Olimb) (PP)
Tolvanen (Lepistö) (PP) – 16:36	1–1
Tolvanen (Peltola) – 25:32	2–1
Savinainen (Koskiranta) – 42:59	3–1
Lepistö (Kontiola) (PP) – 47:54	4–1
Manninen (Kontiola) – 56:48	5–1

8 min
Penalties
12 min
30
Shots
22

16 February 2018; 21:10	Sweden	1–0 (1–0, 0–0, 0–0)	Germany	Kwandong Hockey Centre, Gangneung; Attendance: 3,077

Game reference
Jhonas Enroth	Goalies	Timo Pielmeier	Referees: (United States) Timothy Mayer (Russia) Konstantin Olenin; Linesmen: (Switzerland) Roman Kaderli (Canada) Nathan Vanoosten
Stålberg (Zackrisson, Bergström) – 02:00 / 1–0			Referees: (United States) Timothy Mayer (Russia) Konstantin Olenin; Linesmen: (Switzerland) Roman Kaderli (Canada) Nathan Vanoosten
10 min	Penalties	6 min	Referees: (United States) Timothy Mayer (Russia) Konstantin Olenin; Linesmen: (Switzerland) Roman Kaderli (Canada) Nathan Vanoosten
26	Shots	28	Referees: (United States) Timothy Mayer (Russia) Konstantin Olenin; Linesmen: (Switzerland) Roman Kaderli (Canada) Nathan Vanoosten

18 February 2018; 12:10	Germany	2–1 GWS (0–0, 1–0, 0–1) (OT: 0–0) (SO: 1–0)	Norway	Gangneung Hockey Centre, Gangneung; Attendance: 5,534

Game reference
Danny aus den Birken	Goalies	Lars Haugen	Referees: (United States) Mark Lemelin (Finland) Anssi Salonen; Linesmen: (Sweden) Jimmy Dahmen (Russia) Alexander Otmakhov
Hager (Kahun, Macek) (PP) – 32:53 / 1–0; / 1–1 / 45:19 – Reichenberg (Holøs, Bastiansen)			Referees: (United States) Mark Lemelin (Finland) Anssi Salonen; Linesmen: (Sweden) Jimmy Dahmen (Russia) Alexander Otmakhov
Hager; Plachta; Kahun	Shootout	(miss) Bastiansen; (miss) Reichenberg; (miss) M. Olimb	Referees: (United States) Mark Lemelin (Finland) Anssi Salonen; Linesmen: (Sweden) Jimmy Dahmen (Russia) Alexander Otmakhov
10 min	Penalties	55 min	Referees: (United States) Mark Lemelin (Finland) Anssi Salonen; Linesmen: (Sweden) Jimmy Dahmen (Russia) Alexander Otmakhov
38	Shots	29	Referees: (United States) Mark Lemelin (Finland) Anssi Salonen; Linesmen: (Sweden) Jimmy Dahmen (Russia) Alexander Otmakhov

18 February 2018; 21:10	Sweden	3–1 (1–0, 0–1, 2–0)	Finland	Kwandong Hockey Centre, Gangneung; Attendance: 3,861

Game reference

Viktor Fasth
Goalies
Mikko Koskinen
Referees:
(Canada) Oliver Gouin
(Czech Republic) Antonín Jeřábek
Linesmen:
(Switzerland) Roman Kaderli
(Germany) Lukas Kohlmüller

Lander (Omark, Fasth) – 14:53	1–0
	1–1	21:32 – Kemppainen (Koivisto, Junttila)
Zackrisson (Fransson) – 48:53	2–1
Möller (Omark) (PP, ENG) – 59:55	3–1

10 min
Penalties
14 min
23
Shots
19

=== Ranking after preliminary round ===
Following the completion of the preliminary round, all teams were ranked 1D through 12D. To determine this ranking, the following criteria were used in the order presented:

1. higher position in the group
2. higher number of points
3. better goal difference
4. higher number of goals scored for
5. better 2017 IIHF World Ranking.

Team advanced to Quarterfinals
Team played in Qualification playoffs

Rank	Team	Group	Pos	GP	Pts	GD	GF	IIHF Rank
1D	Sweden	C	1	3	9	+7	8	3
2D	Czech Republic	A	1	3	8	+5	9	6
3D	Olympic Athletes from Russia	B	1	3	6	+9	14	2
4D	Canada	A	2	3	7	+7	11	1
5D	Finland	C	2	3	6	+5	11	4
6D	Slovenia	B	2	3	4	−4	8	15
7D	United States	B	3	3	4	−4	4	5
8D	Switzerland	A	3	3	3	+1	10	7
9D	Germany	C	3	3	2	−3	4	8
10D	Slovakia	B	4	3	4	−1	6	11
11D	Norway	C	4	3	1	−9	2	9
12D	South Korea	A	4	3	0	−13	1	21

== Playoff round ==
=== Bracket ===
Playoffs
20 February
United States	5
Slovakia	1
20 February
Slovenia	1
Norway (OT)	2
20 February
Finland	5
South Korea	2
20 February
Switzerland	1
Germany (OT)	2

Quarterfinals
21 February
Czech Republic (GWS)	3
United States	2
21 February
Olympic Athletes from Russia	6
Norway	1
21 February
Canada	1
Finland	0
21 February
Sweden	3
Germany (OT)	4

Semifinals
23 February
Czech Republic	0
Olympic Athletes from Russia	3
23 February
Canada	3
Germany	4

Gold medal game
25 February
Olympic Athletes from Russia (OT)	4
Germany	3
Bronze medal game
24 February
Czech Republic	4
Canada	6

=== Qualification playoffs ===
The four highest-ranked teams (1D–4D) received byes and were deemed the home team in the quarterfinals as they were seeded to advance, with the remaining eight teams (5D–12D) playing qualification playoff games as follows. The losers of the qualification playoff games received a final ranking of 9 through 12 based on their preliminary round ranking.

20 February 2018; 12:10	United States	5–1 (0–0, 3–1, 2–0)	Slovakia	Gangneung Hockey Centre, Pyeongchang; Attendance: 6,391

Game reference

Ryan Zapolski
Goalies
Ján Laco
Referees:
(Finland) Aleksi Rantala
(Finland) Anssi Salonen
Linesmen:
(Sweden) Henrik Pihlblad
(Finland) Sakari Suominen

Donato (Gilroy, Terry) – 21:36	1–0
Wisniewski (Terry) (PP2) – 22:20	2–0
Arcobello (Terry) – 33:30	3–0
	3–1	36:54 – Čerešňák (Graňák, Nagy)
Roe (Little, O'Neill) – 49:52	4–1
Donato (Wisniewski) (PP) – 56:46	5–1

8 min
Penalties
33 min
33
Shots
23

20 February 2018; 16:40	Slovenia	1–2 OT (1–0, 0–0, 0–1) (OT: 0–1)	Norway	Gangneung Hockey Centre, Pyeongchang; Attendance: 6,312

Game reference

Gašper Krošelj
Goalies
Lars Haugen
Referees:
(Switzerland) Daniel Stricker
(Switzerland) Tobias Wehrli
Linesmen:
(Czech Republic) Vít Lederer
(Czech Republic) Miroslav Lhotský

Urbas (Muršak) (PP) – 06:38	1–0
	1–1	43:06 – Kristiansen (Røymark, Bastiansen)
	1–2	63:06 – Bonsaksen (Rosseli Olsen, P. Thoresen)

4 min
Penalties
12 min
34
Shots
26

20 February 2018; 21:10	Finland	5–2 (1–0, 2–2, 2–0)	South Korea	Gangneung Hockey Centre, Pyeongchang; Attendance: 5,409

Game reference

Mikko Koskinen
Goalies
Matt Dalton
Referees:
(Russia) Roman Gofman
(United States) Timothy Mayer
Linesmen:
(Switzerland) Nicolas Fluri
(Russia) Gleb Lazarev

Kontiola (Tolvanen, Kemppainen) (PP) – 04:42	1–0
Kontiola (Lepistö, Tolvanen) (PP) – 23:44	2–0
Heiskanen (Tolvanen) – 26:23	3–0
	3–1	30:06 – Radunske (Regan, Kim S.W.)
	3–2	32:09 – Ahn J.H. (Shin S.H.)
Hietanen (Osala, Savinainen) (PP) – 47:20	4–2
Manninen (Hietanen, Koskiranta) (ENG) – 59:53	5–2

2 min
Penalties
8 min
36
Shots
19

20 February 2018; 21:10	Switzerland	1–2 OT (0–1, 1–0, 0–0) (OT: 0–1)	Germany	Kwandong Hockey Centre, Pyeongchang; Attendance: 2,878

Game reference

Jonas Hiller
Goalies
Danny aus den Birken
Referees:
(Czech Republic) Jan Hribik
(Sweden) Linus Öhlund
Linesmen:
(United States) Fraser McIntyre
(Finland) Hannu Sormunen

	0–1	01:19 – Pföderl (Hördler, Hager) (PP)
Moser (Ambühl, Suter) – 23:40	1–1
	1–2	60:26 – Seidenberg (Kahun, Mauer)

29 min
Penalties
12 min
21
Shots
25

=== Quarterfinals ===
Following the quarterfinal games, the winning teams were re-ranked F1 through F4, with the winner of 1D vs. E4 re-ranked as F1, the winner of 2D vs. E3 re-ranked as F2, the winner of 3D vs. E2 re-ranked as F3, and the winner of 4D vs. E1 re-ranked as F4. The losers of the quarterfinal round games received a final ranking of 5 through 8 based on their preliminary round ranking.

21 February 2018; 12:10	Czech Republic	3–2 GWS (1–1, 1–1, 0–0) (OT: 0–0) (SO: 1–0)	United States	Gangneung Hockey Centre, Pyeongchang; Attendance: 2,948

Game reference

Pavel Francouz
Goalies
Ryan Zapolski
Referees:
(Canada) Oliver Gouin
(Sweden) Linus Öhlund
Linesmen:
(Switzerland) Roman Kaderli
(Finland) Hannu Sormunen

	0–1	06:20 – Donato (Terry)
Kolář (Kovář) – 15:12	1–1
Kundrátek (Růžička, Mozík) – 28:14	2–1
	2–2	30:23 – Slater (O'Neill) (SH)

Růžička (miss)
Koukal
Kovář (miss)
Kubalík (miss)
Kundrátek (miss)
Shootout
(miss) Bourque
(miss) Donato
(miss) Arcobello
(miss) Terry
(miss) Butler
10 min
Penalties
8 min
29
Shots
20

21 February 2018; 16:40	Olympic Athletes from Russia	6–1 (3–0, 2–1, 1–0)	Norway	Gangneung Hockey Centre, Pyeongchang; Attendance: 3,553

Game reference

Vasily Koshechkin
Goalies
Lars Haugen
Henrik Haukeland
Referees:
(Czech Republic) Jan Hribik
(United States) Timothy Mayer
Linesmen:
(Germany) Lukas Kohlmüller
(United States) Judson Ritter

Grigorenko (Kablukov, Telegin) – 08:54	1–0
Gusev (Mozyakin, Datsyuk) (PP) – 13:25	2–0
Voynov (Gusev, Kaprizov) – 19:20	3–0
	3–1	27:21 – Bonsaksen (M. Olimb, K.A. Olimb)
Kalinin (Kovalchuk, Voinov) (PP) – 28:35	4–1
Nesterov (Gusev, Datsyuk) (PP) – 33:06	5–1
Telegin (Grigorenko, Kablukov) – 53:15	6–1

10 min
Penalties
10 min
32
Shots
14

21 February 2018; 21:10	Canada	1–0 (0–0, 0–0, 1–0)	Finland	Gangneung Hockey Centre, Pyeongchang; Attendance: 2,265

Game reference
Ben Scrivens; Kevin Poulin	Goalies	Mikko Koskinen	Referees: (Czech Republic) Antonín Jeřábek (Russia) Konstantin Olenin; Linesmen: (Russia) Gleb Lazarev (Sweden) Henrik Pihlblad
Noreau (O'Dell) – 40:55 / 1–0			Referees: (Czech Republic) Antonín Jeřábek (Russia) Konstantin Olenin; Linesmen: (Russia) Gleb Lazarev (Sweden) Henrik Pihlblad
6 min	Penalties	4 min	Referees: (Czech Republic) Antonín Jeřábek (Russia) Konstantin Olenin; Linesmen: (Russia) Gleb Lazarev (Sweden) Henrik Pihlblad
30	Shots	21	Referees: (Czech Republic) Antonín Jeřábek (Russia) Konstantin Olenin; Linesmen: (Russia) Gleb Lazarev (Sweden) Henrik Pihlblad

21 February 2018; 21:10	Sweden	3–4 OT (0–2, 0–0, 3–1) (OT 0–1)	Germany	Kwandong Hockey Centre, Pyeongchang; Attendance: 2,092

Game reference

Viktor Fasth
Goalies
Danny aus den Birken
Referees:
(United States) Mark Lemelin
(Finland) Aleksi Rantala
Linesmen:
(Czech Republic) Miroslav Lhotský
(Canada) Nathan Vanoosten

	0–1	13:48 – Ehrhoff (Hager, Schütz) (PP)
	0–2	14:17 – Noebels (Kink)
Lander (Dahlin, Omark) – 46:25	1–2
	1–3	48:28 – Kahun (Mauer)
Hersley (Omark, Wikstrand) (PP) – 49:35	2–3
Wikstrand (Zackrisson) – 51:37	3–3
	3–4	61:30 – Reimer (Ehliz, Boyle)

4 min
Penalties
6 min
34
Shots
25

=== Semifinals ===
23 February 2018; 16:40	Czech Republic	0–3 (0–0, 0–2, 0–1)	Olympic Athletes from Russia	Gangneung Hockey Centre, Pyeongchang; Attendance: 4,330

Game reference

Pavel Francouz
Goalies
Vasily Koshechkin
Referees:
(Canada) Brett Iverson
(United States) Mark Lemelin
Linesmen:
(Sweden) Jimmy Dahmen
(Finland) Sakari Suominen

0–1	27:47 – Gusev (Datsyuk)
0–2	28:14 – Gavrikov (Telegin, Grigorenko)
0–3	59:39 – Kovalchuk (Zub, Zubarev) (ENG)

6 min
Penalties
10 min
31
Shots
22

23 February 2018; 21:10	Canada	3–4 (0–1, 1–3, 2–0)	Germany	Gangneung Hockey Centre, Pyeongchang; Attendance: 4,057

Game reference

Kevin Poulin
Goalies
Danny aus den Birken
Referees:
(Slovakia) Jozef Kubuš
(United States) Timothy Mayer
Linesmen:
(United States) Fraser McIntyre
(Russia) Alexander Otmakhov

	0–1	14:43 – Macek (Kahun) (PP2)
	0–2	23:21 – Plachta (Hager)
	0–3	26:49 – Mauer (Goc, Wolf)
Brulé (Lee, Noreau) (PP) – 28:17	1–3
	1–4	32:31 – Hager (Plachta, Schütz) (PP)
Robinson (Thomas, Raymond) – 42:42	2–4
Roy (Lee, Noreau) (PP) – 49:42	3–4

35 min
Penalties
16 min
31
Shots
15

=== Bronze medal game ===
24 February 2018; 21:10	Czech Republic	4–6 (1–3, 0–0, 3–3)	Canada (bronze)	Gangneung Hockey Centre, Pyeongchang; Attendance: 4,807

Game reference

Pavel Francouz
Goalies
Kevin Poulin
Referees:
(United States) Timothy Mayer
(Russia) Konstantin Olenin
Linesmen:
(United States) Fraser McIntyre
(Russia) Alexander Otmakhov

	0–1	08:57 – Ebbett (Robinson, Gragnani) (PP)
Růžička (Červenka) – 09:13	1–1
	1–2	09:28 – Kelly (Goloubef, Klinkhammer)
	1–3	15:57 – Roy (Kozun, Bourque)
	1–4	45:50 – Ebbett (Kozun, Goloubef)
Kovář (Horák, Řepík) (EA) – 46:36	2–4
	2–5	49:37 – Kelly (Klinkhammer)
	2–6	55:23 – Wolski (Howden)
Červenka (Nakládal, Mertl) – 56:26	3–6
Červenka (Polášek, Mozík) (PP, EA) – 57:55	4–6

4 min
Penalties
6 min
34
Shots
26

=== Gold medal game ===
Germany took the lead with 3:16 left in the third period. Then the Olympic Athletes from Russia took a penalty with 2:11 left, pulled their goaltender to make it 5-on-5, and scored with 56 seconds left to send the game to overtime. Kirill Kaprizov scored a power play goal to win the gold medal game.

25 February 2018; 13:10	(gold) Olympic Athletes from Russia	4–3 OT (1–0, 0–1, 2–2) (OT 1–0)	Germany (silver)	Gangneung Hockey Centre, Gangneung; Attendance: 5,075

Game reference

Vasily Koshechkin
Goalies
Danny aus den Birken
Referees:
(United States) Mark Lemelin
(Finland) Aleksi Rantala
Linesmen:
(Sweden) Jimmy Dahmen
(Finland) Sakari Suominen

Voynov (Gusev, Kaprizov) – 19:59	1–0
	1–1	29:32 – Schütz (Macek, Hager)
Gusev (Kaprizov, Datsyuk) – 53:21	2–1
	2–2	53:31 – Kahun (Mauer, Ehliz)
	2–3	56:44 – J. Müller (Ehliz, Hördler)
Gusev (Zub, Kaprizov) (SH, EA) – 59:04	3–3
Kaprizov (Gusev, Voynov) (PP) – 69:40	4–3

4 min
Penalties
6 min
30
Shots
25

== Final ranking ==
Pos	Grp	Team	Pld	W	OTW	OTL	L	GF	GA	GD	Pts	Final result
1	B	Olympic Athletes from Russia	6	4	1	0	1	27	9	+18	14	Champions
2	C	Germany	7	1	3	1	2	17	18	−1	10	Runners-up
3	A	Canada	6	4	0	1	1	21	12	+9	13	Third place
4	A	Czech Republic	6	2	2	0	2	16	15	+1	10	Fourth place
5	C	Sweden	4	3	0	1	0	11	5	+6	10	Eliminated in Quarterfinals
6	C	Finland	5	3	0	0	2	16	9	+7	9	Eliminated in Quarterfinals
7	B	United States	5	2	0	2	1	11	12	−1	8	Eliminated in Quarterfinals
8	C	Norway	5	0	1	1	3	5	18	−13	3	Eliminated in Quarterfinals
9	B	Slovenia	4	0	2	1	1	9	14	−5	5	Eliminated in Qualification playoffs
10	A	Switzerland	4	1	0	1	2	11	11	0	4	Eliminated in Qualification playoffs
11	B	Slovakia	4	1	0	1	2	7	12	−5	4	Eliminated in Qualification playoffs
12	A	South Korea (H)	4	0	0	0	4	3	19	−16	0	Eliminated in Qualification playoffs

Source: IIHF.com
(H) Host

== Statistics ==
=== Scoring leaders ===
List shows the top ten skaters sorted by points, then goals.

Player	GP	G	A	Pts	+/−	PIM	POS
Nikita Gusev	6	4	8	12	+7	4	F
Kirill Kaprizov	6	5	4	9	+7	2	F
(Finland) Eeli Tolvanen	5	3	6	9	+1	4	F
Ilya Kovalchuk	6	5	2	7	+5	4	F
(Germany) Patrick Hager	7	3	4	7	–3	4	F
(Canada) Maxim Noreau	6	2	5	7	+3	0	D
Derek Roy	6	2	5	7	–2	8	F
(Sweden) Linus Omark	4	0	7	7	+6	0	F
(United States) Ryan Donato	5	5	1	6	–1	2	F
(Slovenia) Jan Muršak	4	3	3	6	–1	0	F

GP = Games played; G = Goals; A = Assists; Pts = Points; +/− = Plus/minus; PIM = Penalties in minutes; POS = Position
Source: IIHF.com

=== Leading goaltenders ===
Only the top five goaltenders, based on save percentage, who have played at least 40% of their team's minutes, are included in this list.

Player	TOI	GA	GAA	SA	Sv%	SO
(Switzerland) Jonas Hiller	211:19	4	1.14	91	95.60	1
Vasily Koshechkin	348:08	8	1.38	126	93.65	2
(Finland) Mikko Koskinen	296:38	8	1.62	117	93.16	0
(Slovenia) Gašper Krošelj	188:44	6	1.91	87	93.10	0
(Canada) Ben Scrivens	149:17	4	1.61	56	92.86	0

TOI = Time on ice (minutes:seconds); SA = Shots against; GA = Goals against; GAA = Goals against average; Sv% = Save percentage; SO = Shutouts
Source: IIHF.com

== Awards ==
- Media All-Stars
  - Goaltender: Vasily Koshechkin
  - Defencemen: (Canada) Maxim Noreau, Vyacheslav Voynov
  - Forwards: Ilya Kovalchuk, Pavel Datsyuk, (Finland) Eeli Tolvanen
- Most Valuable Player: Ilya Kovalchuk
- Best players selected by the directorate:
  - Best Goaltender: (Germany) Danny aus den Birken
  - Best Defenceman: Vyacheslav Voynov
  - Best Forward: Nikita Gusev

Source: IIHF.com
