= Dominik Kahun =

German ice hockey player (born 1995)

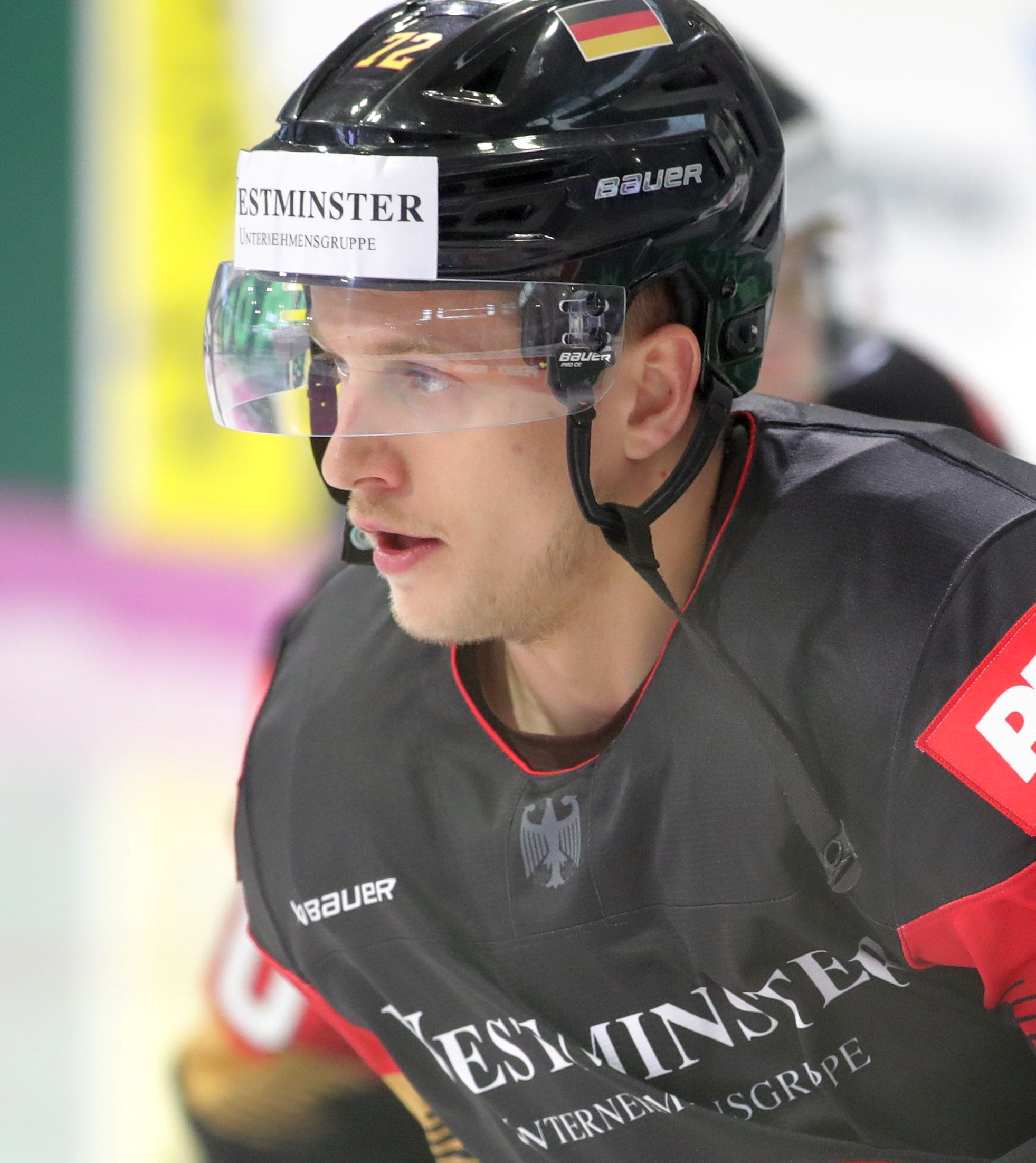
- Kahun with Germany in 2023
- Born: 2 July 1995 (age 31) Planá, Czech Republic
- Height: 5 ft 11 in (180 cm)
- Weight: 174 lb (79 kg; 12 st 6 lb)
- Position: Forward
- Shoots: Left
- DEL team Former teams: EHC München; Chicago Blackhawks; Pittsburgh Penguins; Buffalo Sabres; Edmonton Oilers; SC Bern; Lausanne HC
- National team: Germany
- NHL draft: Undrafted
- Playing career: 2014–present

Dominik Kahun (born 2 July 1995) is a Czech-born German professional ice hockey player who is a forward for EHC Red Bull München of the Deutsche Eishockey Liga (DEL). He previously has played for the Chicago Blackhawks, Pittsburgh Penguins, Buffalo Sabres and Edmonton Oilers of the National Hockey League (NHL).

== Playing career ==
Born in the Czech Republic, Kahun moved to Germany with his family as a child. Kahun played junior hockey with the Jungadler Mannheim U18 team, where he was the league's leading scorer for the 2011–12 season. He then moved to Canada where he played two seasons of major junior hockey with the Sudbury Wolves of the Ontario Hockey League (OHL).

On 4 April 2014, it was confirmed that Kahun had signed with EHC Red Bull München to begin his professional career with the 2014–15 season in the Deutsche Eishockey Liga (DEL). In 2016, he won the DEL title with München.

On 21 May 2018, Kahun as an undrafted free agent signed a two-year entry-level contract with the Chicago Blackhawks of the National Hockey League (NHL). Kahun made his NHL debut on 3 October and recorded his first two NHL points, both assists, in a 7–6 overtime loss against the Toronto Maple Leafs on 8 October. He recorded his first career NHL goal on 11 October in a 4–3 overtime loss to the Minnesota Wild. He appeared in all 82 games with the Blackhawks in the 2018–19 season, providing scoring depth to Chicago, finishing tied 7th among all rookies in NHL scoring with 13 goals and 37 points.

On 15 June 2019, Kahun was traded by the Blackhawks to the Pittsburgh Penguins along with a 2019 fifth-round pick for Olli Maatta. Kahun scored his first goal with the Penguins on 26 October 2019 against the Dallas Stars. Kahun was injured on 19 January 2020, suffering a concussion during a game against the Boston Bruins. He returned to the line-up on 18 February after missing 8 games. In 50 games with the Pittsburgh Penguins, Kahun added 10 goals and 17 assists. On 24 February 2020, he was traded to the Buffalo Sabres in exchange for Conor Sheary and Evan Rodrigues. Kahun made six appearances with the Sabres, collecting two goals and 4 points before the regular season was initially paused then concluded due to the COVID-19 pandemic.

Due to salary cap considerations, Kahun was not tendered a qualifying offer by the Sabres during the offseason, making him a free agent. On 1 November 2020, Kahun was signed to a one-year, $975,000 contract by the Edmonton Oilers, joining countryman and league MVP Leon Draisaitl. With the 2020–21 NHL season set to be delayed due to the pandemic, Kahun was loaned by the Oilers to return to his German club, EHC München of the DEL, on 6 November 2020, until the commencement of Edmonton's training camp.

On 6 September 2021, Kahun joined SC Bern of the National League (NL) as a free agent on a three-year deal through the end of the 2023/24 season. On 22 August 2022, SC Bern and Kahun agreed to another three year extension that runs through the end of the 2026/27 season.

On February 18, 2025, it was announced that Kahun would play for the Lausanne HC with immediate effect. His contract with the Lausanne HC lasts until the end of the 2026/27 season. After one and half seasons with Lausanne, Kahun opted to mutually terminate his contract early and leave the NL by agreeing to a return to his original club, EHC München of the DEL, on 29 May 2026.

== International play ==
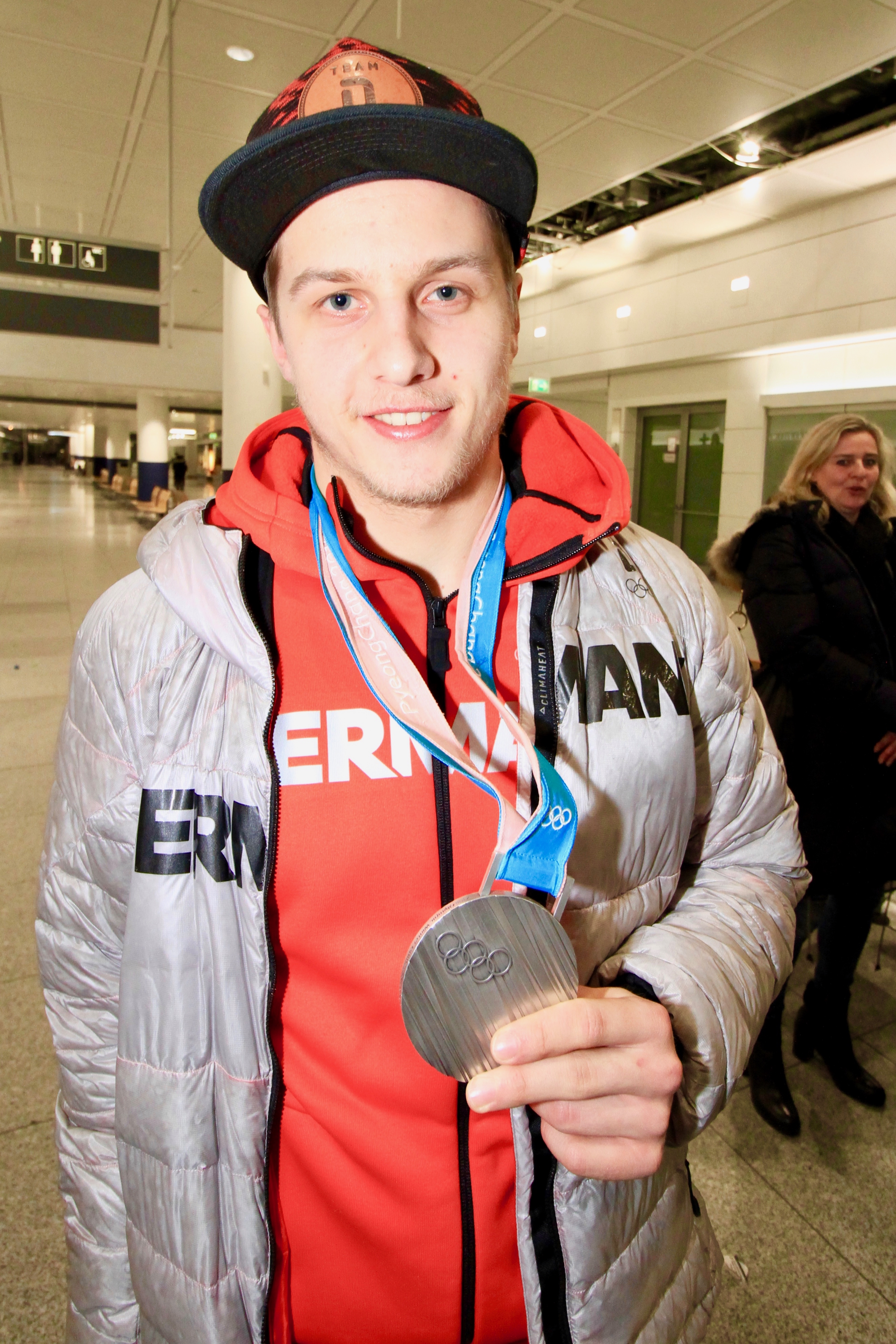
- Kahun with his silver medal at the 2018 Winter Olympics in Pyeongchang

Medal record

Representing Germany

Ice hockey

Olympic Games
Silver medal – second place	2018 Pyeongchang	

World Championships
Silver medal – second place	2023 Finland/Latvia	

Kahun made his senior international debut by representing Germany at the Ice Hockey World Championships in 2016 and later featured in the, 2017, 2018, and 2019 events.

Kahun represented Germany at the 2018 Winter Olympics, earning a silver medal.

== Personal life ==
Kahun has a brother, Phillip, who is seven years younger than him, and a sister, Karolina, who is fourteen years his junior. He grew up in the small town of Weiden in der Oberpfalz, Germany, after moving there from the Czech Republic at the age of three, though he continued to play hockey in the Czech Republic for a time.

== Career statistics ==
=== Regular season and playoffs ===
			Regular season					Playoffs
Season	Team	League	GP	G	A	Pts	PIM	GP	G	A	Pts	PIM
2010–11	Jungadler Mannheim	DNL	7	0	0	0	0	—	—	—	—	—
2011–12	Jungadler Mannheim	DNL	36	21	36	57	4	8	3	9	12	0
2012–13	Sudbury Wolves	OHL	58	13	27	40	8	9	1	5	6	4
2013–14	Sudbury Wolves	OHL	43	9	22	31	8	5	1	1	2	0
2014–15	EHC München	DEL	33	4	2	6	8	4	0	1	1	0
2014–15	SC Riessersee	DEL2	12	7	8	15	0	—	—	—	—	—
2015–16	EHC München	DEL	42	12	22	34	2	14	3	9	12	4
2016–17	EHC München	DEL	40	11	19	30	6	14	2	9	11	0
2017–18	EHC München	DEL	42	12	29	41	2	17	4	10	14	2
2018–19	Chicago Blackhawks	NHL	82	13	24	37	6	—	—	—	—	—
2019–20	Pittsburgh Penguins	NHL	50	10	17	27	8	—	—	—	—	—
2019–20	Buffalo Sabres	NHL	6	2	2	4	0	—	—	—	—	—
2020–21	Edmonton Oilers	NHL	48	9	6	15	2	2	0	0	0	0
2021–22	SC Bern	NL	42	16	28	44	29	—	—	—	—	—
2022–23	SC Bern	NL	23	4	17	21	4	9	6	3	9	2
2023–24	SC Bern	NL	47	15	35	50	6	7	0	1	1	0
2024–25	SC Bern	NL	24	2	7	9	4	—	—	—	—	—
2024–25	Lausanne HC	NL	4	0	1	1	0	19	3	10	13	0
2025–26	Lausanne HC	NL	29	5	8	13	6	7	4	3	7	0
DEL totals			157	39	72	111	18	49	9	29	38	6
NHL totals			186	34	49	83	16	2	0	0	0	0
NL totals			169	42	96	138	49	42	13	17	30	2

=== International ===
Year	Team	Event	Result	GP	G	A	Pts	PIM
2012	Germany	U17	9th	5	0	2	2	0
2012	Germany	WJC18	6th	6	1	2	3	0
2013	Germany	WJC	9th	6	0	3	3	4
2013	Germany	WJC18	8th	5	3	4	7	4
2014	Germany	WJC	9th	7	4	3	7	0
2015	Germany	WJC	10th	6	0	1	1	0
2016	Germany	WC	7th	7	1	3	4	2
2016	Germany	OGQ	Q	3	0	3	3	0
2017	Germany	WC	8th	8	2	5	7	0
2018	Germany	OG	2nd place, silver medalist(s)	7	2	3	5	2
2018	Germany	WC	11th	7	1	2	3	0
2019	Germany	WC	6th	8	1	4	5	0
2021	Germany	WC	4th	5	0	3	3	0
2022	Germany	OG	10th	4	1	2	3	0
2023	Germany	WC	2nd place, silver medalist(s)	10	1	6	7	0
2024	Germany	WC	6th	8	3	1	4	0
2025	Germany	WC	9th	7	2	5	7	0
2026	Germany	OG	6th	5	0	1	1	0
2026	Germany	WC	10th	6	0	0	0	2
Junior totals				35	8	15	23	8
Senior totals				85	14	38	52	6

== Awards and honours ==
Award	Year
DNL champion	2012
DEL champion	2016, 2017, 2018
