= Pavel Francouz =

Czech ice hockey player (born 1990)

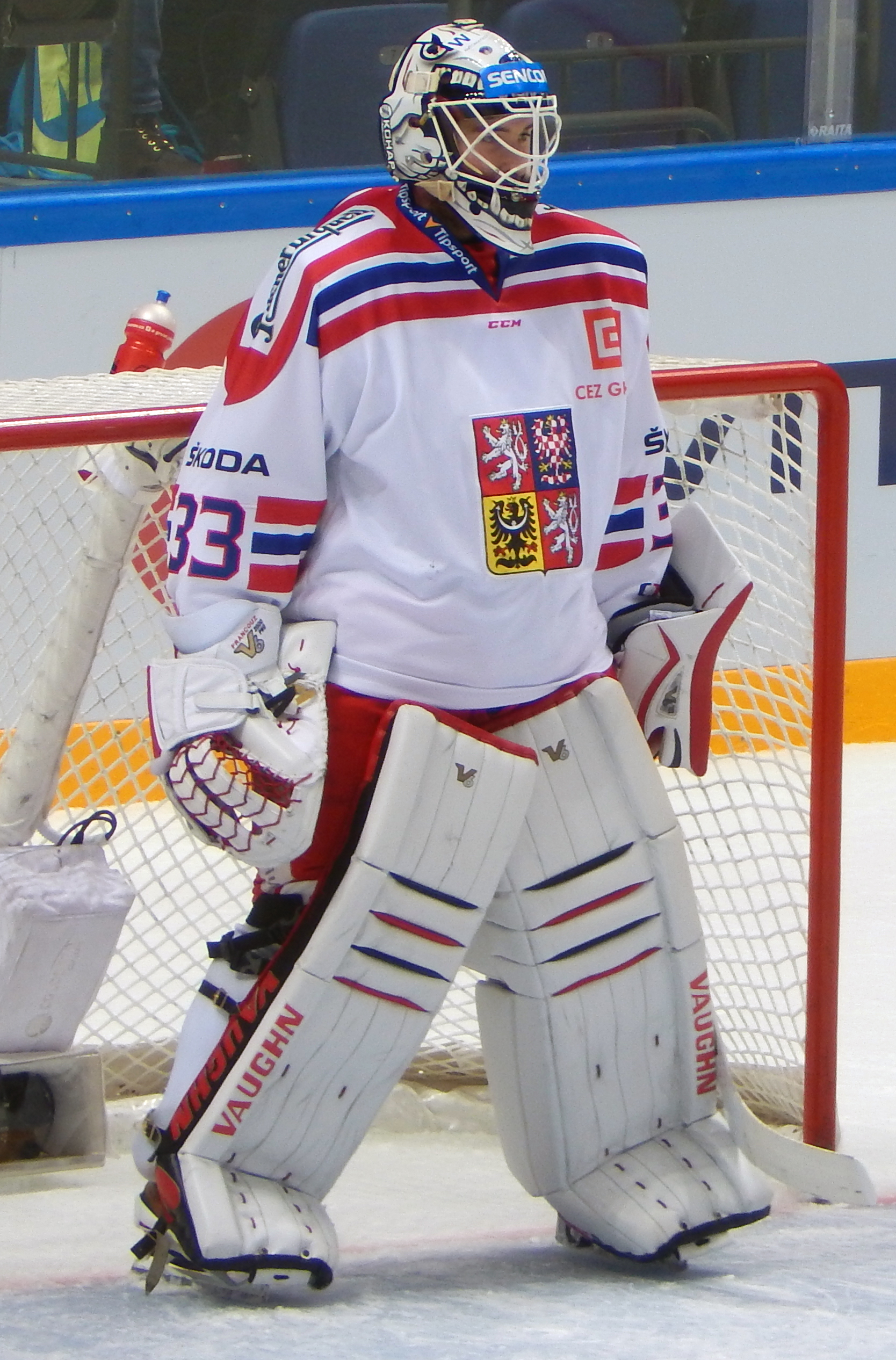
- Francouz with Czech Republic in 2015
- Born: 3 June 1990 (age 36) Plzeň, Czechoslovakia
- Height: 6 ft 0 in (183 cm)
- Weight: 180 lb (82 kg; 12 st 12 lb)
- Position: Goaltender
- Caught: Right
- Played for: HC Plzeň; HC Oceláři Třinec; HC Litvínov; Traktor Chelyabinsk; Colorado Avalanche
- National team: Czech Republic
- NHL draft: Undrafted
- Playing career: 2008–2023

Pavel Francouz (Czech: [ˈpavɛl ˈfrantsous]; born 3 June 1990) is a Czech former professional ice hockey goaltender, who most notably played for the Colorado Avalanche of the National Hockey League (NHL), with whom he won the Stanley Cup with in 2022.

== Playing career ==
=== Czech Republic ===
Francouz first played at the junior level within the ranks of hometown club, HC Plzeň. As a 15-year-old, he backstopped the club's under-18 team in the 2005–06 season, posting a sub-2.00 GAA. In the following 2006–07 season, he led the league with 25 wins. In the 2007–08 season, Francouz assumed the starting goaltender position at the highest junior level in the Czech Republic at the under-20 league. He recorded 25 wins in 37 games to lead the club into the postseason.

Having signed a first team contract with HC Plzeň, Francouz made his professional debut in the Czech Extraliga during the 2008–09 season. In 15 games, he collected 6 wins with a solid SV% of .922. At the under-20 level, he finished the season with the League's best statistics in all categories.

Francouz spent the next 2009–10 season continuing his development, appearing in 8 Extraliga games, while also playing in the Czech 1. Liga on loan to HC Tabor and SK Horácká Slavia Třebíč.

On 13 May 2010, to earn more experience professionally, Francouz left Plzeň to sign a contract with HC Slovan Ústečtí Lvi of the Czech 1. Liga. In the 2010–11 season, he was initially loaned to former 1. Liga club SK Horácká slavia Třebíč, before splitting the year in making an impact with his new club Ústečtí Lvi, posting the best GAA and SV% in the League and leading Slovan Ústečtí Lvi to the championship.

During his second season with Ústečtí in 2011–12, Francouz's strong play was rewarded as he was loaned and trained with HC Oceláři Třinec. He made just one appearance with Třinec, allowing 4 goals against before he was replaced in the second intermission.

On 9 May 2012, Francouz secured a place in the Extraliga, agreeing to a contract with HC Litvínov beginning from the 2012–13 season. He instantly assumed Litvínov's starting role and in 46 games repaid the club by registering the most league wins with 26 and earned recognition as the Extraliga's Best Goaltender.

In the 2014–15 season, Francouz, through 46 games, cemented his status as the best Goaltender in the Czech Republic, leading the league in most statistical categories, to earn the MVP award of both regular season and playoffs as Litvínov claimed the Championship.

=== Traktor Chelyabinsk ===
After three years in Litvínov, Francouz opted to leave as a free agent and continue his career in the Kontinental Hockey League (KHL) by agreeing to a three-year contract with Russian outfit Traktor Chelyabinsk on 30 April 2015. In his first season with Traktor in 2015–16, Francouz assumed backup duties to Vasili Demchenko. He posted a .924 save percentage despite collecting just 3 wins in 18 games as Chelyabinsk missed the postseason.

The following 2016–17 season, Francouz shared the starting role with Demchenko after initially earning KHL player of the week honors (30 October). He continued his strong play, earning a selection to the 2017 All-Star Game. In 30 games with Traktor, Francouz accumulated 14 wins and finished the year with the KHL's best SVS% (.953).

Despite lucrative contract offers and interest, Francouz was not released from the final year of his contract and remained in Traktor for the 2017–18 season. He again shared starting duties and appeared in a season high 35 games with 15 wins, and for the second consecutive season led the league in SVS%. Selected to backstop the club in the postseason, and led Traktor to the Conference Finals before suffering a series defeat to eventual Champions Ak Bars Kazan.

=== Colorado Avalanche ===
Francouz signed a one-year, one-way deal of $690,000 with the Colorado Avalanche on 2 May 2018. After attending his first training camp with the Avalanche, Francouz was assigned to begin his first North American season in 2018–19 with American Hockey League (AHL) affiliate the Colorado Eagles. In transitioning to the smaller rink size, Francouz quickly adapted and registered 6 wins through his first 7 games with the Eagles, earning the starting role. He received his first call-up to the Avalanche on 22 December 2018, and immediately made his NHL debut, relieving Philipp Grubauer in a defeat against the Arizona Coyotes. Returning to the Eagles, Francouz was recalled for a second time and made a second consecutive appearance in relief stepping in against the San Jose Sharks on 1 January 2019. He returned to the AHL and was named in the 2019 AHL All-Star Classic before missing it due to injury. He led the Eagles to the postseason with a 27–17–3 record, finishing third in league wins and leading the AHL in saves. In the playoffs, Francouz started all four contests with the Eagles (posting 1 win), yet was unable to help advance past the first round. Joining the Avalanche's extended squad for their postseason run, Francouz was later re-signed to a one-year, $950,000 contract extension on 25 May 2019.

With the departure of longtime Avalanche goaltender Semyon Varlamov in the off-season, Francouz assumed the backup duties for Colorado leading into the 2019–20 season. He became the first Avalanche goaltender since Vitali Kolesnik in 2005 to collect his first win in his first NHL start, backstopping a 3–2 overtime victory over the Arizona Coyotes on 12 October 2019. Assuming a higher workload through injuries to Grubauer, Francouz established himself through November and December, posting a 9–0–1 record over 12 games, the longest undefeated streak since Varlamov in 2014. In the midst of starting a career high 7 straight games, on 21 February 2020, Francouz recorded his first NHL shutout, and that same day the Avalanche signed him to a two-year, $4 million extension. He finished the regular season leading the Avalanche with 21 winn, finishing in league top ten in both save percentage and goals against.

With the NHL returning for the playoffs after the COVID-19 pandemic enforced hiatus, Francouz made his postseason debut in the Western Conference seeding round, becoming the first goaltender in Franchise history to record a shutout in his first start after a 4–0 victory over the Dallas Stars on 5 August 2020. Helping Colorado advance to the second round, Francouz was drawn into action after a season-ending injury to Philipp Grubauer in the opening series game on 22 August 2020. Hampered by injury himself, Francouz collected 3 defeats through four games against the Stars before he was ruled out through games 5-7 of the series loss.

In the pandemic-delayed 2020–21 season, Francouz, having returned from double-knee surgery, backed up Grubauer for the opening two games of the campaign before the Avalanche announced that Francouz would be placed on the long-term injured reserve list to have a season-ending double hip surgery on 4 February 2021.

Returning to health, Francouz suffered another setback after injuring his ankle in his first pre-season game for the 2021–22 season on 5 October 2021. Ruled out for the opening two months of the season, Francouz was sent on a conditioning loan in a return to the Colorado Eagles of the AHL. Collecting 3 wins through 4 games, Francouz returned to the Avalanche and made his first NHL appearance in over a year in a 5–2 defeat to the Nashville Predators on 16 December 2021. Returning to action after testing positive to COVID and a team-wide shut down, Francouz quickly regained his level of play and after recording 10 wins through his first 14 games, Francouz opted to forgo free agency to sign another two-year, $4 million extension with the Avalanche on 12 March 2022. Francouz was summoned into action during the 2022 Stanley Cup playoffs after an eye injury to starter Darcy Kuemper during their first round matchup against the Nashville Predators, and would help the Avalanche win the last two games of the series in a sweep. He would later be named the starter for game two of the Western Conference Finals against the Edmonton Oilers after Kuemper experienced complications to his eye injury. He recorded his second career postseason shutout in the game, stopping all 24 shots he faced. Francouz remained in net for the remainder of the conference finals, helping the Avalanche reach the 2022 Stanley Cup Final.

On 11 October 2023, Francouz was placed on the long-term injury reserve due to a groin injury that he suffered back in May 2023. On 12 November, it was announced that Francouz would not play during the 2023–24 season. On April 19, 2024, Francouz concluded his 15-year professional career after announcing his retirement from hockey due to persistent health issues.

On 11 July 2024, after helping prepare the Avalanche's goaltending draft list during his final season injured under contract, Francouz was officially announced to have remained within the Avalanche organization after he was hired as a goaltending scout based in Europe.

== International play ==
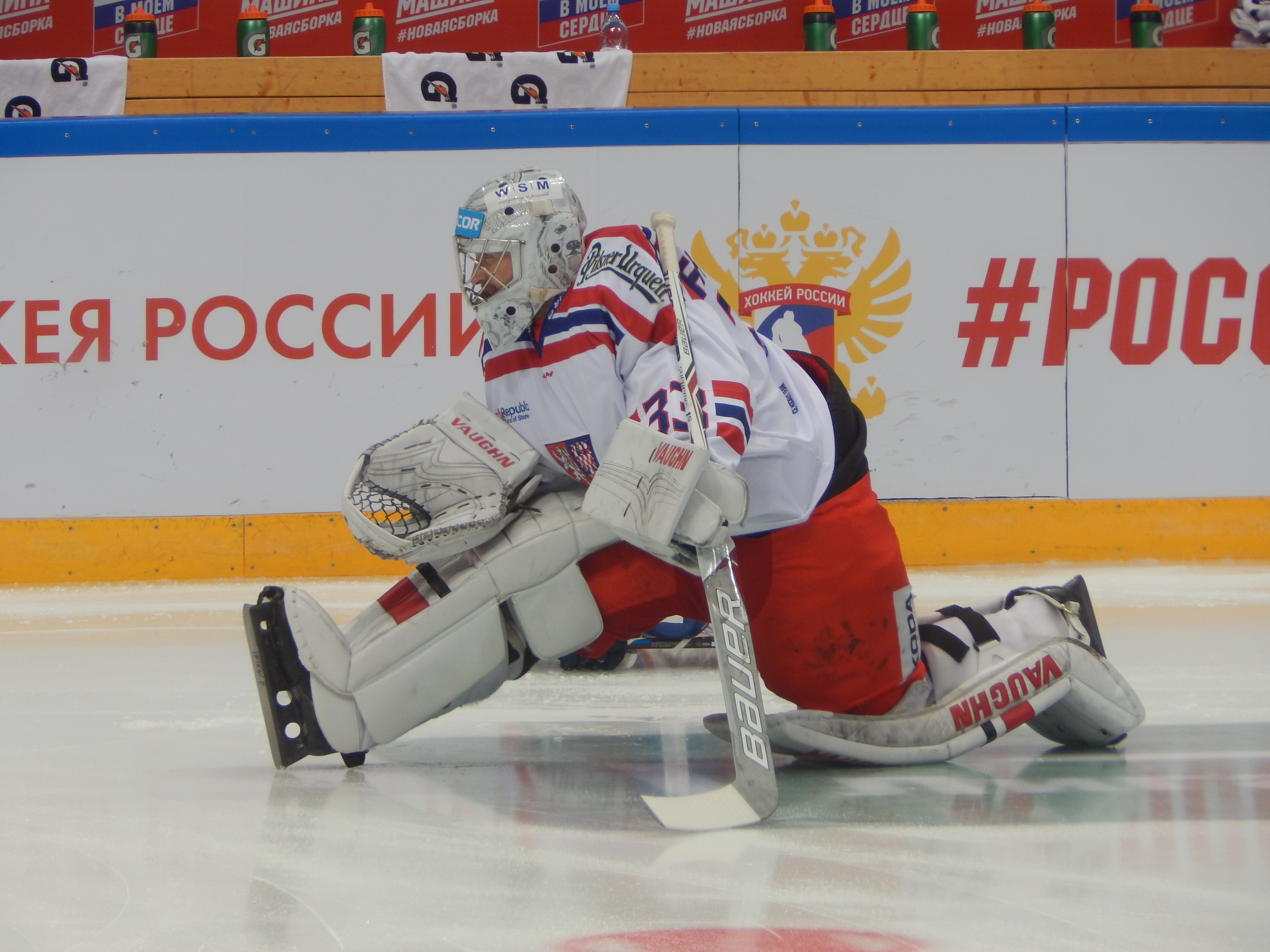
Francouz representing Czech Republic at the 2017 World Championships.

Francouz was first introduced to the International stage at the Junior level, competing for Czech Republic at the Division I 2008 World U18 Championships in Kazan, Russia. As the team's backup he appeared in one game, helping Czech Republic place first in Group A and return to the Top Division for the following year. He next featured for the Czechs at the 2010 World Junior Championship.

Francouz made his senior debut with the Czech Republic, competing in the 2013 World Championship. He made two relief appearances for the Czechs in a seventh-place finish. He was named to the roster of the 2014 World Championships, however failed to feature in a game before making his first full start at the 2016 World Championships.

In the 2017 World Championships he shared netminding duties with Petr Mrázek, posting a 3–1 record with a 1.49 goals against and .910 save percentage. As an established member of the national team, Francouz was next selected to participate at the 2018 Winter Olympics in PyeongChang, Korea. As the first choice, Francouz appeared in every game for the Czech Republic, posting a 4–2 record in helping reach the semi-finals before losing to Russia. He was unable to prevent the Czechs suffer a 6–4 defeat in the bronze medal game against Canada on 24 February 2018.

On 26 April 2018, Francouz was slated to make his fifth tournament appearance with Czech Republic after he was selected for the 2018 World Championships.

== Personal life ==
Francouz was born in Plzeň, Czechoslovakia. When he first started playing ice hockey, Francouz was a defenceman. His first language is Czech, but he also gained English and Russian fluency in high school. He holds a pilot license, in which he uses throughout the off-season.

Francouz and his wife have one child.

== Career statistics ==
=== Regular season and playoffs ===
			Regular season									Playoffs
Season	Team	League	GP	W	L	OT	MIN	GA	SO	GAA	SV%	GP	W	L	MIN	GA	SO	GAA	SV%
2007–08	HC Plzeň	Czech.20	37	25	12	0	2163	95	4	2.64	.915	5	2	3	299	12	0	2.41	.926
2008–09	HC Plzeň	Czech.20	20	16	4	0	1205	35	6	1.74	.953	—	—	—	—	—	—	—	—
2008–09	HC Plzeň	ELH	15	6	9	0	709	35	0	2.96	.922	5	0	2	156	5	0	1.92	.941
2008–09	SHC Klatovy	Czech.2	1	0	1	0	25	4	0	9.60	.000	—	—	—	—	—	—	—	—
2009–10	HC Plzeň	Czech.20	6	6	0	0	360	11	0	1.83	.948	2	1	1	120	4	0	2.00	.944
2009–10	HC Plzeň	ELH	8	3	5	0	469	29	0	3.71	.867	—	—	—	—	—	—	—	—
2009–10	HC Tabor	Czech.1	9	5	4	0	546	22	0	2.42	.906	—	—	—	—	—	—	—	—
2009–10	SK Horácká Slavia Třebíč	Czech.1	4	2	2	0	238	7	1	1.76	.948	9	5	4	553	25	0	2.71	.926
2010–11	HC Slovan Ústečtí Lvi	Czech.20	29	10	13	3	1527	87	0	3.42	.896	—	—	—	—	—	—	—	—
2010–11	SK Horácká Slavia Třebíč	Czech.1	15	9	6	0	913	27	3	1.77	.952	—	—	—	—	—	—	—	—
2010–11	HC Slovan Ústečtí Lvi	Czech.1	15	10	5	0	922	32	1	2.08	.926	10	9	1	602	18	0	1.79	.944
2011–12	HC Slovan Ústečtí Lvi	Czech.1	16	12	4	0	947	28	3	1.77	.939	—	—	—	—	—	—	—	—
2011–12	HC Oceláři Třinec	ELH	1	0	1	0	40	4	0	6.00	.800	—	—	—	—	—	—	—	—
2012–13	HC Litvínov	ELH	46	26	20	0	2706	117	1	2.59	.920	7	3	4	440	16	2	2.18	.935
2013–14	HC Litvínov	ELH	48	24	24	0	2906	98	6	2.02	.932	—	—	—	—	—	—	—	—
2014–15	HC Litvínov	ELH	46	32	12	0	2711	94	7	2.08	.931	17	12	5	1045	24	4	1.38	.953
2015–16	Traktor Chelyabinsk	KHL	18	3	7	3	787	29	0	2.21	.924	—	—	—	—	—	—	—	—
2016–17	Traktor Chelyabinsk	KHL	30	14	9	3	1719	41	5	1.43	.953	6	2	4	335	12	0	2.15	.924
2017–18	Traktor Chelyabinsk	KHL	35	15	11	5	1964	59	5	1.80	.946	12	6	5	696	22	0	1.90	.949
2018–19	Colorado Eagles	AHL	49	27	17	3	2803	125	3	2.68	.918	4	1	3	236	13	0	3.31	.895
2018–19	Colorado Avalanche	NHL	2	0	2	0	62	2	0	1.97	.943	—	—	—	—	—	—	—	—
2019–20	Colorado Avalanche	NHL	34	21	7	4	1915	77	1	2.41	.923	6	2	4	316	17	1	3.23	.892
2021–22	Colorado Eagles	AHL	4	3	1	0	237	6	1	1.52	.945	—	—	—	—	—	—	—	—
2021–22	Colorado Avalanche	NHL	21	15	5	1	1201	51	2	2.55	.916	7	6	0	341	16	1	2.81	.906
2022–23	Colorado Avalanche	NHL	16	8	7	1	965	42	1	2.61	.915	—	—	—	—	—	—	—	—
KHL totals			83	32	27	11	4,470	129	10	1.73	.945	18	8	9	1,031	34	0	1.98	.943
NHL totals			73	44	21	6	4,141	172	4	2.49	.919	13	8	4	657	33	2	3.01	.899

=== International ===
Year	Team	Event	Result	GP	W	L	OT	MIN	GA	SO	GAA	SV%
2008	Czech Republic	U18-D1	11th	1	1	0	0	60	2	0	2.00	.895
2010	Czech Republic	WJC	7th	2	0	1	0	100	8	0	4.76	.862
2013	Czech Republic	WC	7th	2	0	0	0	7	0	0	0.00	1.000
2014	Czech Republic	WC	4th	—	—	—	—	—	—	—	—	—
2016	Czech Republic	WC	5th	4	4	0	0	245	10	0	2.45	.896
2017	Czech Republic	WC	7th	4	3	1	0	241	6	1	1.49	.910
2018	Czech Republic	OG	4th	6	4	2	0	370	14	0	2.27	.905
2018	Czech Republic	WC	7th	5	4	1	0	303	12	1	2.38	.904
2019	Czech Republic	WC	4th	3	2	0	0	155	2	2	0.77	.957
Junior totals				3	1	1	0	160	10	0	3.85	.882
Senior totals				24	17	4	0	1321	44	4	2.00	.910

== Awards and honours ==
Award	Year
ELH
Best Goalie	2013, 2014
Playoffs MVP	2014
KHL
All-Star Game	2017
AHL
All-Star Game	2019
NHL
Stanley Cup champion	2022
