= Christian Thomas (ice hockey) =

Canadian ice hockey player (born 1992)

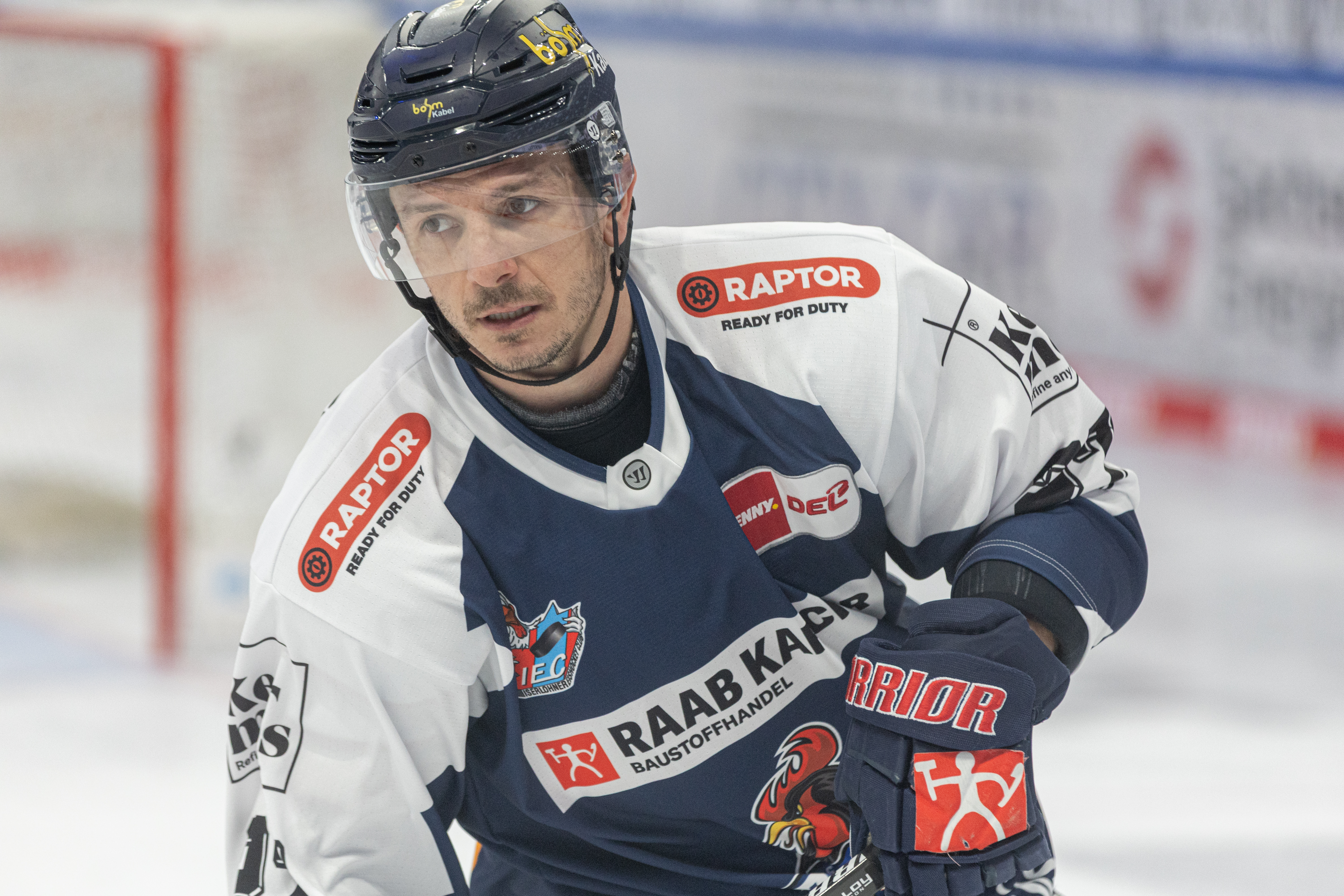
- Thomas with the Iserlohn Roosters in 2025
- Born: May 26, 1992 (age 34) Toronto, Ontario, Canada
- Height: 5 ft 9 in (175 cm)
- Weight: 180 lb (82 kg; 12 st 12 lb)
- Position: Right wing
- Shoots: Right
- DEL team Former teams: Iserlohn Roosters; New York Rangers; Montreal Canadiens; Arizona Coyotes; Rögle BK; Traktor Chelyabinsk; SC Bern; KooKoo; Barys Nur-Sultan; HC Bolzano; Bílí Tygři Liberec; HC Nové Zámky
- National team: Canada
- NHL draft: 40th overall, 2010; New York Rangers
- Playing career: 2011–present

Christian Patrick Thomas (born May 26, 1992) is a Canadian professional ice hockey forward for the Iserlohn Roosters of the Deutsche Eishockey Liga (DEL). He was selected in the second round, 40th overall, by the New York Rangers of the National Hockey League (NHL) in the 2010 NHL entry draft. Thomas has also previously played for the Montreal Canadiens and Arizona Coyotes. He is the son of former NHL player Steve Thomas.

== Playing career ==
=== Junior ===
Thomas started his junior hockey career with the OHL London Knights in 2008 as the 13th overall selection in the OHL Priority Selection. He was traded to the Generals in the middle of the season in a trade in which London received Michael Del Zotto, John Tavares and Daryl Borden. During the 2008–09 season, Thomas scored four goals each for the Knights and the Generals. In 2009–10, his second OHL season, Thomas scored 41 goals. Tyler Seguin and Jeff Skinner were the only two 2010 first round draft picks to score more goals in junior hockey in 2009–10 than Thomas. He also was credited with 25 assists, for a total of 66 points, leading Oshawa in both goals and points. He had four shorthanded goals during the season, a new Oshawa franchise record. He was named the Eastern Conference's most improved player in a post-season coaches poll, and was also in the top three in several other categories—best shot, hardest shot, most dangerous in goal area, and best stickhandler.

In 2010–11, Christian Thomas finished second in the league with 54 goals and sixth in the league in scoring with 99 points, while also tying for the league lead in power play goals. He also finished 5th in the league in game-winning goals with nine. 12 of his regular season goals came against the Kingston Frontenacs, Oshawa's first round playoff opponent. He was named the OHL player of the week three times, including for the first week of the OHL playoffs. At the time Oshawa was eliminated from the OHL playoffs, Thomas was leading the OHL in playoff scoring, and he ended up 7th overall in playoff points and 9th in playoff goals. In the post-season coaches poll, he was named as having the OHL Eastern Conference's best shot and as "most dangerous in the goal area," after finishing as runner up in those categories the prior year. He also repeated his runner-up status as having the conference's hardest shot. Thomas' 95 goals over the 2009–10 and 2010–11 seasons are more than any other OHL player over those two seasons. As a result of Thomas scoring more than 50 goals in 2010–11, Steve and Christian Thomas became the first father son combination to each score 50 goals in a single OHL season. Steve Thomas had scored 51 goals for the Marlboros in 1983–84.

Thomas got off to a slow start in the 2011–12 season, marred by a 10-game suspension for a high-sticking incident. However, he recovered and was named the OHL player of the week for the week of November 28 to December 4 for scoring 3 goals and 6 assists with a +6 plus-minus rating in 2 games. He was also named the Canadian Hockey League (CHL) player of the week for that week, beating out Jérôme Gauthier-Leduc and fellow New York Ranger draftee Michael St. Croix for the honour. He finished the season with 67 points in 55 games with 34 goals and 33 assists. In 6 playoff games he scored 2 goals and 2 assists. After the Generals were eliminated from the 2012 playoffs, Thomas joined the Connecticut Whale of the American Hockey League (AHL).

=== Professional ===
Thomas signed a professional contract with the Rangers on May 19, 2011. He scored his first professional goal for the Connecticut Whale on April 13, 2012, against the Manchester Monarchs. In five regular season games for the Whale in 2011–12, Thomas scored that one goal and added one assist. He also played for the Whale in the AHL playoffs. On February 23, 2013, Thomas was recalled to the Rangers. Thomas made his NHL debut that night against the Montreal Canadiens in Montreal, and was scoreless with 2 shots on goal in 12 minutes as the Rangers were shut out. Thomas returned to the Whale after the game. He finished the 2012–13 AHL season with 19 goals and 16 assists in 73 games for the Whale. After the 2012–13 Whale season, he was added to the Rangers' playoff roster.

On July 2, 2013, Thomas was traded by the Rangers to the Montreal Canadiens in exchange for prospect Danny Kristo.

In the 2014–15 season, on February 12, 2015, Thomas scored his first NHL goal against Edmonton Oilers in Montreal, Quebec at the Bell Centre.

During the 2015–16 season, on December 15, 2015, Thomas was traded by the Canadiens to the Arizona Coyotes in exchange for prospect Lucas Lessio. He was assigned to AHL affiliate, the Springfield Falcons He was recalled for 2 games before the All-Star Break and appeared in a solitary game with the Coyotes before being returned to the AHL during the All-Star Break. During his first game upon returning to the AHL he suffered a season ending injury which required surgical repair.

On July 1, 2016, Thomas signed as a free agent to a one-year, two-way contract with the Washington Capitals. In 65 games with the Bears in the 2016–17 season, Thomas added 24 goals and 49 points.

As a free agent in the following off-season, Thomas was unable to secure an NHL contract and later agreed to a one-year AHL deal with the Wilkes-Barre/Scranton Penguins, affiliate to the Pittsburgh Penguins, on September 13, 2017, in order to maintain his Olympic team eligibility.

After completing his sixth professional season, Thomas signed his first contract abroad as a free agent, agreeing to a one-year deal with Swedish club, Rögle BK of the Swedish Hockey League (SHL), on July 12, 2018. On November 1, 2018, Thomas left the SHL in order to sign a contract for the remainder of the season with Russian outfit, Traktor Chelyabinsk, of the Kontinental Hockey League (KHL).

In the following 2019–20 season, Thomas continued in the KHL with Chelyabinsk, contributing with just 2 goals and 3 points in 20 games. With Traktor finishing well out of playoff contention, on February 17, 2020, Thomas left the KHL and joined SC Bern of the National League (NL) to provide depth for the final playoffs push.

Thomas signed with HC Bozen-Bolzano in August 2022.

On June 18, 2024, Czech Extraliga club HC Bílí Tygři Liberec announced Thomas had been signed to a one-year contract. However, after recording only one assist in 16 games, Liberec released him on November 12.

Thomas then signed with HC Nové Zámky of the Slovak Extraliga and fared better there, recording 26 points in 22 games before being transferred to the Iserlohn Roosters of the German Ice Hockey League on January 21, 2025.

== International play ==
Medal record

Representing Canada

Ice hockey

Olympic Games
Bronze medal – third place	2018 Pyeongchang	

Thomas represented Canada at the 2010 IIHF World U18 Championships. He had two goals and one assist in six games for Team Canada. He was invited to the selection camp for Canada's National Junior Team for the 2012 World Junior Ice Hockey Championships. In November 2017, as part of the Olympic evaluation process, Thomas travelled to Finland as a member of Team Canada to participate in the Karjala Cup. In the final Olympic evaluation tournament, Thomas won the Spengler Cup with Team Canada in Davos, Switzerland on December 31, 2017. Thomas was then selected as a member of Canada's team for the 2018 Winter Olympics where he earned the bronze medal.

== Career statistics ==
=== Regular season and playoffs ===
			Regular season					Playoffs
Season	Team	League	GP	G	A	Pts	PIM	GP	G	A	Pts	PIM
2008–09	London Knights	OHL	32	4	7	11	4	—	—	—	—	—
2008–09	Oshawa Generals	OHL	27	4	10	14	10	—	—	—	—	—
2009–10	Oshawa Generals	OHL	64	41	25	66	27	—	—	—	—	—
2010–11	Oshawa Generals	OHL	66	54	45	99	38	10	9	10	19	4
2011–12	Oshawa Generals	OHL	55	34	33	67	12	6	2	2	4	0
2011–12	Connecticut Whale	AHL	5	1	1	2	0	6	0	0	0	0
2012–13	Connecticut Whale	AHL	73	19	16	35	15	—	—	—	—	—
2012–13	New York Rangers	NHL	1	0	0	0	0	—	—	—	—	—
2013–14	Hamilton Bulldogs	AHL	55	11	16	27	22	—	—	—	—	—
2013–14	Montreal Canadiens	NHL	2	0	0	0	0	—	—	—	—	—
2014–15	Hamilton Bulldogs	AHL	52	11	11	22	18	—	—	—	—	—
2014–15	Montreal Canadiens	NHL	18	1	0	1	7	—	—	—	—	—
2015–16	St. John's IceCaps	AHL	18	7	7	14	4	—	—	—	—	—
2015–16	Montreal Canadiens	NHL	5	0	2	2	2	—	—	—	—	—
2015–16	Springfield Falcons	AHL	16	3	4	7	4	—	—	—	—	—
2015–16	Arizona Coyotes	NHL	1	0	0	0	0	—	—	—	—	—
2016–17	Hershey Bears	AHL	65	24	25	49	6	5	1	0	1	0
2017–18	Wilkes–Barre/Scranton Penguins	AHL	51	18	16	34	14	2	0	0	0	2
2018–19	Rögle BK	SHL	11	0	1	1	0	—	—	—	—	—
2018–19	Traktor Chelyabinsk	KHL	35	9	10	19	22	4	1	0	1	2
2019–20	Traktor Chelyabinsk	KHL	20	2	1	3	6	—	—	—	—	—
2019–20	SC Bern	NL	1	1	0	1	0	—	—	—	—	—
2020–21	KooKoo	Liiga	32	10	13	23	6	2	2	0	2	0
2021–22	Barys Nur–Sultan	KHL	9	0	1	1	0	—	—	—	—	—
2021–22	SC Bern	NL	28	10	7	17	4	—	—	—	—	—
2022–23	HC Bolzano	ICEHL	48	25	10	35	10	19	4	6	10	8
2023–24	HC Bolzano	ICEHL	48	17	21	38	10	11	1	4	5	4
2024–25	Bílí Tygři Liberec	ELH	16	0	1	1	6	—	—	—	—	—
2024–25	HC Nové Zámky	Slovak	22	14	12	26	54	—	—	—	—	—
2024–25	Iserlohn Roosters	DEL	14	6	7	13	4	—	—	—	—	—
AHL totals			335	94	96	190	83	13	1	0	1	2
NHL totals			27	1	2	3	9	—	—	—	—	—
KHL totals			64	11	12	23	28	4	1	0	1	2

=== International ===
Year	Team	Event	Result	GP	G	A	Pts	PIM
2009	Canada Ontario	U17	1st place, gold medalist(s)	6	2	0	2	6
2010	Canada	WJC18	7th	6	2	1	3	6
2018	Canada	OG	3rd place, bronze medalist(s)	6	1	1	2	2
Junior totals				12	4	1	5	12
Senior totals				6	1	1	2	2
