= 2013–14 MHL season =

2013–14 MHL Season
- League: Maritime Junior Hockey League
- Sport: Hockey
- Duration: Preseason; August 29, 2013 – September 9, 2013; Regular season September 13, 2013 – March 8, 2014; Playoffs; March 10, 2014 – April 24, 2014
- Teams: 11
- TV partner: FastHockey
- Finals champions: Truro Bearcats

MHL seasons
- 2012–13 2014–15

The 2013–14 Maritime Junior Hockey League season was the 47th season in league history. The season consisted of 52 games played by each MHL team.

Upon completion the Truro Bearcats won the Kent Cup, the league's playoff championship trophy against the Dieppe Commandos 4 games to 2. The Kent Cup champion Truro Bearcats met the Inouk de Granby (QJAAAHL Champs), the Carleton Place Canadians (CCHL champs) and the Saint-Jérôme Panthers (host) in Saint-Jérôme, Quebec to determine the Eastern Canadian Fred Page Cup champion. At tournaments end the Carleton Place Canadians won the Fred Page Cup, the Bearcats finished 3rd.

The 2013-14 season was the first time in 5 seasons that Summerside or Woodstock did not won the Kent Cup.

== Team Change ==
The Metro Shipbuilders relocated from Dartmouth to Kentville and renamed the Valley Wildcats.

== Regular season standings ==
Final standings

Note: GP = Games played; W = Wins; L = Losses; OTL = Overtime losses; SL = Shootout losses; GF = Goals for; GA = Goals against; PTS = Points; X - Clinched Playoff spot; Y - Clinched Division; Z- Clinched first overall

| Eastlink Division | GP | W | L | OTL | SL | GF | GA | Pts. |
| z-Truro Bearcats | 52 | 38 | 11 | 1 | 2 | 243 | 131 | 79 |
| x-Pictou County Crushers | 52 | 35 | 12 | 0 | 5 | 204 | 137 | 75 |
| x-Amherst Ramblers | 52 | 31 | 18 | 1 | 2 | 202 | 162 | 65 |
| x-Yarmouth Mariners | 52 | 31 | 18 | 2 | 1 | 192 | 183 | 65 |
| x-Valley Wildcats | 52 | 19 | 28 | 4 | 1 | 141 | 204 | 43 |
| Bridgewater Lumberjacks | 52 | 5 | 40 | 3 | 4 | 123 | 269 | 17 |

| Roger Meek Division | GP | W | L | OTL | SL | GF | GA | Pts. |
| y-Miramichi Timberwolves | 52 | 37 | 10 | 0 | 5 | 234 | 141 | 79 |
| x-Dieppe Commandos | 52 | 28 | 16 | 2 | 5 | 200 | 179 | 63 |
| x-Woodstock Slammers | 52 | 28 | 20 | 2 | 2 | 197 | 187 | 60 |
| x-Summerside Western Capitals | 52 | 24 | 23 | 2 | 3 | 178 | 187 | 53 |
| Campbellton Tigers | 52 | 10 | 40 | 1 | 1 | 112 | 246 | 22 |

== 2014 MHL Playoff bracket ==
| Eastlink Division Best 2 of 3 Mini Series (winner plays Truro) |
| 4 | Yarmouth Mariners | 0 |
| 5 | Valley Wildcats | 2 |

Quarter-finals
1 | Truro Bearcats | 4
5 | Valley Wildcats | 0
Eastlink Division
2 | Pictou County Crushers | 4
3 | Amherst Ramblers | 3
1 | Miramichi Timberwolves | 4
4 | Summerside Western Capitals | 1
Roger Meek Division
2 | Dieppe Commandos | 4
3 | Woodstock Slammers | 1

Semi-finals
1 | Truro Bearcats | 4
2 | Pictou County Crushers | 0
1 | Miramichi Timberwolves | 2
2 | Dieppe Commandos | 4

Kent Cup Finals
1 | Truro Bearcats | 4
6 | Dieppe Commandos | 2

== Eastlink Division Mini Series ==
- *= If necessary

The Valley Wildcats (2-0) came into this series as the underdogs after being dominated by the Yarmouth Mariners in the regular season. In game one Valley had proved many people wrong by winning it and beating Yarmouth for the seasons second time. In game 2 Valley managed to edge the Mariners 3-2 in OT to advance to the Eastlink Division semi-finals.

(4) Yarmouth Mariners Vs. (5) Valley Wildcats

| Mon Mar 10 | Yarmouth Mariners | 2-4 | Valley Wildcats | Mariners Centre | Recap |

| Tue Mar 11 | Valley Wildcats | 3-2 | 2OT | Yarmouth Mariners | Kentville Centennial Arena | Recap |

| Valley Wins series 2-0 |

== Quarter-finals ==
=== Eastlink Semi-final 1 (1)Truro Bearcats vs. (5)Valley Wildcats ===
After the Valley Wildcats (2-4) stunned the Yarmouth Mariners in the mini-series they could not pull off a series victory against the Truro Bearcats. Valley was heavily out shout and out scored in this series. Truro managed to get a whopping 24 pucks past Valley in 4 games while Valley managed just 6. Truro ended up sweeping the series and advancing to the Eastlink Division finals.

| Sat Mar 15 | Truro Bearcats | 7-1 | Valley Wildcats | Rath Eastlink Community Centre | Recap |

| Tue Mar 18 | Valley Wildcats | 2-5 | Truro Bearcats | Kentville Centennial Arena | Recap |

| Thu Mar 20 | Truro Bearcats | 7-3 | Valley Wildcats | Rath Eastlink Community Centre | Recap |

| Sat Mar 22 | Valley Wildcats | 0-5 | Truro Bearcats | Kentville Centennial Arena | Recap |

| Truro wins series 4-0 |

=== Eastlink Semi-final 2 (2)Pictou County Crushers vs. (3) Amherst Ramblers ===
The Pictou County Crushers (4-3) managed to edge the Amherst Ramblers (3-4) in seven games in a home team advantage series. Pictou County luckily clinched home ice advantage in this series by finishing ahead of Amherst. The home team won all seven games of the best of seven set. Pictou County with the series victory moved on to the Eastlink Division finals.

| Thu Mar 13 | Pictou County Crushers | 5-2 | Amherst Ramblers | Pictou County Wellness Centre | Recap |

| Sat Mar 15 | Amherst Ramblers | 4-1 | Pictou County Crushers | Amherst Stadium | Recap |

| Tue Mar 18 | Pictou County Crushers | 4-1 | Amherst Ramblers | Pictou County Wellness Centre | Recap |

| Thu Mar 20 | Amherst Ramblers | 5-4 | Pictou County Crushers | Amherst Stadium | Recap |

| Sat Mar 22 | Pictou County Crushers | 5-2 | Amherst Ramblers | Pictou County Wellness Centre | Recap |

| Fri Mar 28 | Amherst Ramblers | 2-1 | Pictou County Crushers | Amherst Stadium | Recap |

| Sat Mar 29 | Pictou County Crushers | 3-2 | Amherst Ramblers | Pictou County Wellness Centre | Recap |

| Pictou County wins series 4-3 |

=== Roger Meek Semi-final 1 (1)Miramichi Timberwolves vs. (4) Summerside Western Capitals ===
| Sat Mar 15 | Miramichi Timberwolves | 4-3 | Summerside Western Capitals | Miramichi Civic Centre | Recap |

| Mon Mar 17 | Summerside Western Capitals | 0-1 | Miramichi Timberwolves | Consolidated Credit Union Place | Recap |

| Wed Mar 19 | Miramichi Timberwolves | 9-6 | Summerside Western Capitals | Miramichi Civic Centre | Recap |

| Fri Mar 21 | Summerside Western Capitals | 5-2 | Miramichi Timberwolves | Consolidated Credit Union Place | Recap |

| Sun Mar 23 | Miramichi Timberwolves | 3-2 | Summerside Western Capitals | Miramichi Civic Centre | Recap |

| Miramichi wins series 4-1 |

=== Roger Meek Semi-finals (2)Dieppe Commandos vs. (3) Woodstock Slammers ===
| Sun Mar 16 | Dieppe Commandos | 6-2 | Woodstock Slammers | Arthur-J-LeBlanc Arena | Recap |

| Wed Mar 19 | Woodstock Slammers | 2-4 | Dieppe Commandos | Carleton Civic Centre | Recap |

| Fri Mar 21 | Dieppe Commandos | 7-3 | Woodstock Slammers | Arthur-J-LeBlanc Arena | Recap |

| Sat Mar 22 | Woodstock Slammers | 5-2 | Dieppe Commandos | Carleton Civic Centre | Recap |

| Tue Mar 25 | Dieppe Commandos | 5-4 | Woodstock Slammers | Arthur-J-LeBlanc Arena | Recap |

| Dieppe wins series 4-1 |

== Semi-finals ==
=== Roger Meek Final (1) Miramichi Timberwolves vs. (2) Dieppe Commandos ===
| Tue Apr 1 | Miramichi Timberwolves | 3-5 | Dieppe Commandos | Miramichi Civic Centre | Recap |

| Thu Apr 3 | Dieppe Commandos | 2-3 | 2OT | Miramichi Timberwolves | Arthur-J-LeBlanc Arena | Recap |

| Sat Apr 5 | Miramichi Timberwolves | 2-5 | Dieppe Commandos | Miramichi Civic Centre | Recap |

| Mon Apr 07 | Dieppe Commandos | 4-3 | Miramichi Timberwolves | Arthur-J-LeBlanc Arena | Recap |

| Wed Apr 09 | Miramichi Timberwolves | 3-1 | Dieppe Commandos | Miramichi Civic Centre | Recap |

| Fri Apr 11 | Dieppe Commandos | 4-1 | Miramichi Timberwolves | Arthur-J-LeBlanc Arena | Recap |

| Dieppe wins series 4-2 |

=== Eastlink Final (1) Truro Bearcats vs. (2)Pictou County Crushers ===
| Thu Apr 03 | Truro Bearcats | 7-2 | Pictou County Crushers | Rath Eastlink Community Centre | Recap |

| Wed Apr 02 | Pictou County Crushers | 2-6 | Truro Bearcats | Pictou County Wellness Centre | Recap |

| Sat Apr 05 | Truro Bearcats | 4-3 | Pictou County Crushers | Rath Eastlink Community Centre | Recap |

| Sun Apr 06 | Pictou County Crushers | 3-4 | 1OT | Truro Bearcats | Pictou County Wellness Centre | Recap |

| Truro wins series 4-0 |

== Kent Cup final ==
=== Kent Cup final (1E) Truro Bearcats vs. (2M) Dieppe Commandos ===
The Truro Bearcats(12-2) defeated the Dieppe Commandos (10-7) 4 games to 2 to win the 2014 Kent Cup. During the series the Bearcats showed to their home fans that they have come to play this season and to win, but the Commandos showed at home that they also were there to play and win. But after all was said and done the favored Bearcats emerged as league champions. The Bearcats will now advance to the Fred Page Cup for a chance to defend their cup and a chance to advance to the Royal Bank Cup for the second straight year.

| Tue Apr 15 | Truro Bearcats | 2-1 | Dieppe Commandos | Rath Eastlink Community Centre | Recap |
| Phillip Fife - 13:03 | | First period | No scoring |
| No scoring | | Second period | No scoring |
| Daniel Perigo - 3:35 | | Third period | 15:31 - Joel Blanchard |
| Chris Festarini 31 saves/32 shots | | Goalie stats | Connor Wilkinson 23 saves/25 shots |

| Thu Apr 17 | Dieppe Commandos | 3-2 | Truro Bearcats | Arthur-J-LeBlanc Arena | Recap |
| Cody Drover - 3:08 | | First period | 16:46 - pp - Jacob Smith |
| Colton Parsons - 15:40 | | Second period | 7:05 - Daniel Perigo |
| Justin McDonald - 2:34 | | Third period | No scoring |
| Connor Wilkinson 24 saves/26 shots | | Goalie stats | Chris Festarini 27 saves/30 shots |

| Sat Apr 19 | Truro Bearcats | 3-1 | Dieppe Commandos | Rath Eastlink Community Centre | Recap |
| Phillip Fife - 1:18; Brandon Pye - pp - 11:11 | | First period | No scoring |
| Kyle Tibbo - 12:48 | | Second period | No scoring |
| No scoring | | Third period | 18:01 - pp - Justin McDonald |
| Chris Festarini 27 saves/28 shots | | Goalie stats | Connor Wilkinson 31 saves/34 shots |

| Mon Apr 21 | Dieppe Commandos | 3-2 | 2OT | Truro Bearcats | Arthur-J-LeBlanc Arena | Recap |
| No scoring | | First period | | No scoring |
| Matt Bernier - 17:52 | | Second period | | 13:21 - Kyle Tibbo |
| Andrew Merdith - 16:48 | | Third period | | 19:45 - Phillip Fife |
| Colton Parsons - 1:45 | | Second overtime period | | No scoring |
| Connor Wilkinson 38 saves/40 shots | | Goalie stats | | Chris Festarini 38 saves/40 shots |

| Tue Apr 22 | Truro Bearcats | 5-4 | Dieppe Commandos | Rath Eastlink Community Centre | Recap |
| No scoring | | First period | No scoring |
| Kyle Tibbo - 10:05 | | Second period | 7:00 - Thierry Comtois; 19:40 - Mathieu Martin |
| Jordan McNaughton - 6:48; Jacob Smith - 7:30; Mitchell Robillard - 9:33; Jordan McNaughton - 19:17 | | Third period | 3:19 - pp - Joel Blanchar; 13:20 - pp Matt Bernier |
| Chris Festarini 23 saves/27 shots | | Goalie stats | Connor Wilkinson 31 saves/36 shots |

| Thu Apr 24 | Dieppe Commandos | 2-5 | Truro Bearcats | Arthur-J-LeBlanc Arena | Recap |
| No scoring | | First period | 1:59 - Mitchell Robillard; 18:23 - pp - Jordan McNaughton |
| Joel Blanchard - 13:13 | | Second period | 1:56 - Jacob Smith |
| Andrew Meredith - 10:09 | | Third period | 5:11 - Kyle Tibbo; 14:43 - Phillip Fife |
| Connor Wilkinson 31 saves/36 shots | | Goalie stats | Chris Festarini 34 saves/36 shots |

| Truro wins series 4-2 |

== Fred Page Cup Championship ==
Hosted by the St. Jerome Panthers in Saint-Jerome, Quebec

Fred Page Cup Tournament

=== Round robin ===
Key; x = Clinched championship round berth; y = Clinched first overall

FPC Round Robin
| Rank | Team | League | W-L-OTL | GF | GA | PTS |
| 1 | (Ontario) y-Carleton Place Canadians | CCHL | 3-0-0 | 12 | 7 | 9 |
| 2 | (Quebec) x-St-Jérôme Panthers | Host | 2-1-0 | 15 | 14 | 5 |
| 3 | (Nova Scotia) x-Truro Bearcats | MHL | 1-1-1 | 12 | 13 | 3 |
| 4 | (Quebec) Granby Inouk | QJAAAHL | 0-2-1 | 8 | 12 | 1 |

Tie Breaker: Head-to-Head, then 3-way +/-.

==== Truro Bearcats Schedule & Results ====
| Wed Apr 30 | Truro Bearcats | 5-4 | OT | (Quebec) Inouk de Granby | Aréna Melançon | Recap |
| No scoring | | First period | | No scoring |
| Jeff Haynes (1) - 7:26; Brandon Pye (1) - 11:59 | | Second period | | 6:18 - sh - Erik Longtin (1); 6:49 - Steven Mercier (1) |
| Brandon Pye (2) - 3:41; Colby Lanceleve (1) - 18:50 | | Third period | | 0:30 - Jason Crack (1); 16:29 - Pier-Olivier Marcoux (1) |
| Jordan McNaughton (1) - pp - 2:09 | | First overtime period | | No scoring |
| Chris Festarini 30 saves/34 shots | | Goalie stats | | Simon Bergeron 36 saves/41 shots |

| Final |

| Thu May 01 | (Quebec) Saint-Jérôme Panthers | 7-6 | OT | Truro Bearcats | Aréna Melançon | Recap |
| Pier-Olivier Grand-Maison (3) - 3:00; Pier-Olivier Grand-Maison (4) - pp - 19:46 | | First period | | 18:07 - sh - Mitchell Robillard (1) |
| Pier-Olivier Grand-Maison (5) - 4:11 | | Second period | | 1:22 - Jordan McNaughton (2); 2:30 - Phil Fife (1); 3:33 - Denver Lynds (1); 7:01 - pp - Phil Fife (2) |
| Jonathan Charbonneau (2) - 4:23; Gary Horic (1) - 4:34; Jonathan Charbonneau (3) - 11:59 | | Third period | | 6:44 - Colby Lanceleve (2) |
| Samuel Aquin (1) - 3:58 | | Overtime | | No scoring |
| Philippe Gingras 25 saves/ 31 shots | | Goalie stats | | Chris Festarini 27 saves/ 34 shots |

| Final |

| Fri May 02 | (Ontario) Carleton Place Canadians | 2-1 | Truro Bearcats | Aréna Melançon |
| No scoring | | First period | No scoring |
| Andy Sturtz (2) - 13:41 | | Second period | 1:15 - Ryan Moore (1) |
| Anthony Latina (1) - 2:12 | | Third period | No scoring |
| Guillaume Therien 21 saves/ 22 shots | | Goalie stats | Chris Festarini 33 saves/ 35 shots |

| Final |

==== Semi-final ====
| Sat May 03 | (Quebec) Saint-Jérôme Panthers | 5-2 | Truro Bearcats | Aréna Melançon | Recap |
| Benjamin Laliberté (1) - 00:17 | | First period | No scoring |
| Pier-Olivier Grand-Maison (7) - pp - 9:40; Gary Horic (3) - 9:50 | | Second period | 10:35 - Jordan McNaughton (3) |
| Nicolas Dionne (1) - 2:32; Samuel Aquin (2) - pp - 18:29 | | Third period | 14:50 - Colby Lanceleve (3) |
| Philippe Gingras 26 saves / 28 shots | | Goalie stats | Chris Festarini 30 saves / 35 shots |

| Final |

== Awards ==
All Star Team

- Allstar Goaltender - Clint Windsor - Miramichi Timberwolves
- Allstar Forwards - Rankyn Campbell - Miramichi Timberwolves, Bryce Milson - Miramichi Timberwolves, Jake Wright - Woodstock Slammers
- Allstar Defense - Dan Poliziani - Truro Bearcats, Trey Lewis - Miramichi Timberwolves

Individual Awards

- Player of the Year - Rankyn Campbell – Miramichi Timberwolves
- Defense of the Year - Trey Lewis – Miramichi Timberwolves
- Rookie of the Year - Blade Mann-Dixon – Valley Wildcats
- Top Scorer - Jake Wright – Woodstock Slammers
- Top Goal-tending Duo - Jacob Fancy and Chris Festarini – Truro Bearcats
- Community Leadership Award - Patrick Durgy – Campbellton Tigers
- Character Award - Stephen MacInnis – Pictou County Crushers
- Playoff MVP - Dan Poliziani - Truro Bearcats
- Coach of the Year - Jeff LeBlanc - Dieppe Commandos
- GM of the Year - JF Damphousse - Dieppe Commandos
- Moe Bent Builders Award -
