= Dominik Graňák =

Slovak ice hockey player (born 1983)

- Born: June 11, 1983 (age 43) Havířov, Czechoslovakia
- Height: 6 ft 0 in (183 cm)
- Weight: 179 lb (81 kg; 12 st 11 lb)
- Position: Defence
- Shot: Left
- Czech team Former teams: HC Škoda Plzeň; HK Dukla Trenčín; HC Slavia Praha; Färjestad BK; Rögle BK; HC Dynamo Moscow; Linköpings HC; HC Fribourg-Gottéron; HK Hradec Králové; HC Karlovy Vary
- National team: Slovakia
- Playing career: 2002–2023

Dominik Graňák (born June 11, 1983) is a Slovak professional ice hockey defenceman, currently playing for HC Škoda Plzeň of the Czech Extraliga (ELH).

On November 4, 2014, Graňák signed a one-year contract in returning to the SHL with Linköpings HC. He joined the club as a free agent after four seasons with Russian club, HC Dynamo Moscow of the Kontinental Hockey League.

He has represented Slovakia in four IIHF World Championships, including 2007.

Medal record

Representing Slovakia

Men's ice hockey

World Championships
Silver medal – second place	2012 Finland	

== Career statistics ==
=== Regular season and playoffs ===
			Regular season					Playoffs
Season	Team	League	GP	G	A	Pts	PIM	GP	G	A	Pts	PIM
2000–01	Dukla Trenčín	SVK U20	43	3	5	8	37	3	1	0	1	2
2001–02	HC Slavia Praha	CZE U20	42	1	7	8	18	—	—	—	—	—
2002–03	HC Slavia Praha	CZE U20	20	2	4	6	4	—	—	—	—	—
2002–03	HC Slavia Praha	ELH	39	0	1	1	10	15	0	1	1	0
2003–04	HC Slavia Praha	ELH	51	2	5	7	42	19	0	4	4	10
2004–05	HC Slavia Praha	ELH	49	1	10	11	20	7	0	1	1	0
2005–06	HC Slavia Praha	ELH	46	3	9	12	34	15	1	3	4	22
2006–07	HC Slavia Praha	ELH	52	3	12	15	74	6	1	1	2	12
2007–08	Färjestad BK	SEL	53	7	13	20	38	12	0	1	1	6
2008–09	Färjestad BK	SEL	53	5	16	21	40	13	2	5	7	8
2009–10	Rögle BK	SEL	50	10	19	29	52	—	—	—	—	—
2010–11	Dynamo Moscow	KHL	51	7	17	24	42	6	0	2	2	2
2011–12	Dynamo Moscow	KHL	42	5	15	20	38	21	2	9	11	12
2012–13	Dynamo Moscow	KHL	35	5	9	14	24	21	3	6	9	10
2013–14	Dynamo Moscow	KHL	35	6	6	12	18	5	0	0	0	0
2014–15	Linköpings HC	SHL	16	1	2	3	8	—	—	—	—	—
2014–15	HC Fribourg–Gottéron	NLA	14	1	4	5	6	—	—	—	—	—
2015–16	Rögle BK	SHL	52	6	15	21	40	—	—	—	—	—
2016–17	Rögle BK	SHL	49	0	5	5	24	—	—	—	—	—
2017–18	Mountfield HK	ELH	52	2	17	19	24	13	0	1	1	6
2018–19	Mountfield HK	ELH	52	3	3	6	26	4	0	0	0	4
2019–20	HC Energie Karlovy Vary	ELH	51	1	19	20	36	2	0	2	2	0
2020–21	HC Energie Karlovy Vary	ELH	35	1	5	6	20	—	—	—	—	—
2020–21	Mountfield HK	ELH	15	1	3	4	0	7	0	0	0	4
2021–22	HC Škoda Plzeň	ELH	53	0	6	6	32	5	1	0	1	6
2022–23	HC Sparta Praha	ELH	9	1	1	2	8	—	—	—	—	—
ELH totals			504	18	91	109	326	93	3	13	16	64
SHL totals			273	29	70	99	202	25	2	6	8	14
KHL totals			163	23	47	70	122	53	5	17	22	24

=== International ===
Year	Team	Event	Result	GP	G	A	Pts	PIM
2001	Slovakia	WJC18	8th	6	0	1	1	2
2003	Slovakia	WJC	5th	6	0	1	1	6
2004	Slovakia	WC	4th	9	0	1	1	4
2005	Slovakia	WC	5th	7	0	0	0	4
2006	Slovakia	WC	8th	7	0	0	0	6
2007	Slovakia	WC	6th	1	0	0	0	0
2008	Slovakia	WC	13th	5	0	1	1	4
2009	Slovakia	WC	10th	6	1	1	2	2
2010	Slovakia	WC	12th	6	0	1	1	2
2011	Slovakia	WC	10th	6	0	1	1	0
2012	Slovakia	WC	2nd place, silver medalist(s)	6	2	1	3	6
2015	Slovakia	WC	9th	7	1	1	2	4
2016	Slovakia	WC	9th	7	1	2	3	4
2018	Slovakia	OG	11th	4	0	4	4	0
2018	Slovakia	WC	9th	7	0	0	0	2
Junior totals				12	0	2	2	8
Senior totals				78	5	13	18	38

== Achievements ==
- Czech Extraliga champion: 2002/03
- Elitserien champion: 2008/09
- Gagarin Cup: 2011/12
