= Andres Ambühl =

Swiss ice hockey player (born 1983)

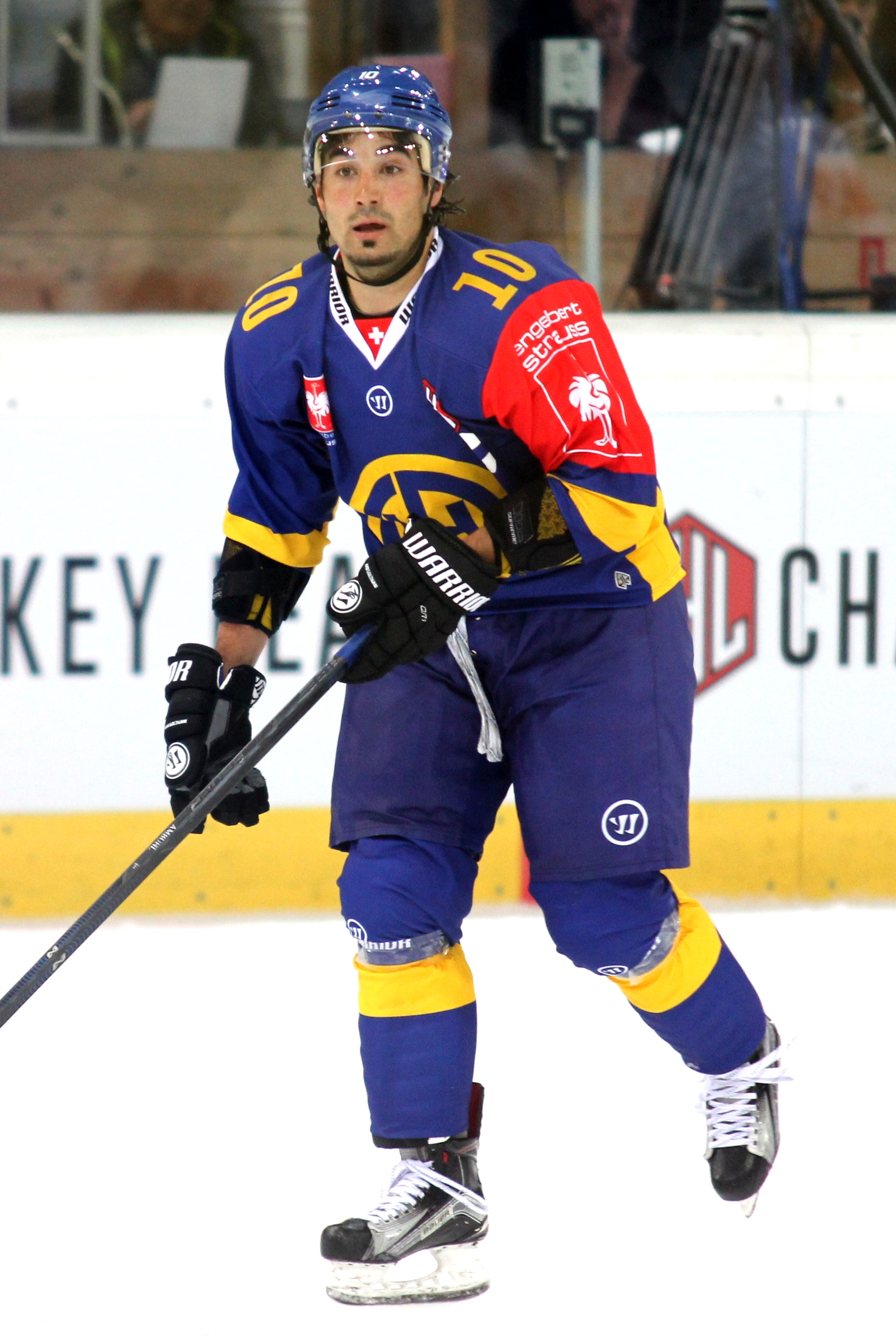
- Ambühl in 2015
- Born: 14 September 1983 (age 42) Davos, Switzerland
- Height: 5 ft 9 in (175 cm)
- Weight: 181 lb (82 kg; 12 st 13 lb)
- Position: Right wing
- Shot: Right
- Played for: HC Davos; Hartford Wolf Pack; ZSC Lions
- National team: Switzerland
- NHL draft: Undrafted
- Playing career: 2001–2025

Andres Ambühl (born 14 September 1983) is a Swiss former professional ice hockey forward who played in the National League (NL). He has won six Swiss top league championships, two Spengler Cups, and three silver medals with Switzerland at the World Championships in 2013, 2024 and 2025. Ambühl also represented Switzerland at Winter Olympics in 2006, 2010, 2014, 2018 and 2022. He holds the records for the most top-division appearances (20) and top-division games played (151) in World Championship history. He was inducted into the IIHF Hall of Fame in 2026.

== Playing career ==
Ambühl began playing junior ice hockey in the HC Davos organization with the club's junior team. In 2000–01, he scored 41 points in 31 games as a junior and debuted in three games with Davos in the Nationalliga A. He joined the senior team in 2001–02, scoring eight points in 38 games during his rookie season. Playing with Davos in the 2006 Spengler Cup as tournament hosts, Ambühl scored the tournament-winning goal against Canada national team in a 3–2 final win. In 2007–08, Ambühl scored a career-high 26 points in 49 games for HC Davos.

Having previously played nine seasons for HC Davos, Ambühl signed a contract with the New York Rangers on 27 May 2009. He was then assigned to the Rangers affiliate, the Hartford Wolf Pack of the American Hockey League (AHL), for the duration of the 2009–10 season.

On 16 April 2010, Andres returned to Switzerland signing a three-year contract with the ZSC Lions. In 2012, he was part of ZSC's Swiss NLA championship-winning team. After three seasons with ZSC Lions, on 28 December 2012, Ambühl returned to his home team HC Davos on a three-year deal starting in the 2013–14 season.

On 28 January 2016, Ambühl signed a three-year contract extension with HC Davos. On 17 December 2018, he agreed to an early two-year contract extension with HC Davos through the 2020–21 season. On 18 January 2021, Ambühl was signed to an early two-year contract extension by HC Davos through the 2022–23 season, and on 28 December 2022, extended his contract until the end of the 2024–25 season.

== International play ==
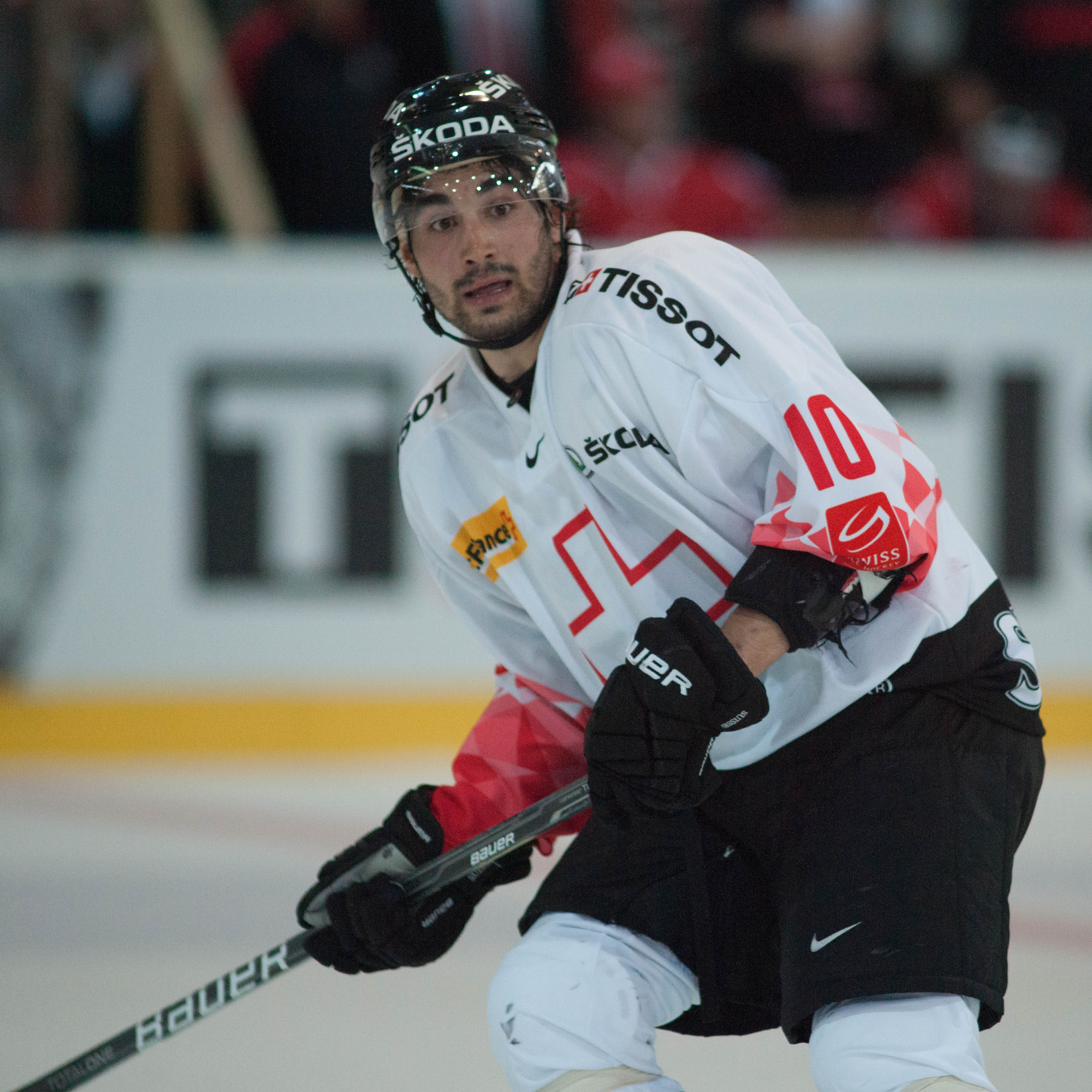

Medal record

Representing Switzerland

Ice hockey

World Championships
Silver medal – second place	2013 Sweden/Finland	
Silver medal – second place	2024 Czechia	
Silver medal – second place	2025 Sweden/Denmark	

He represented Switzerland at the Ice Hockey World Championships and won silver medals in 2013, 2024 and 2025. He holds the record for most IIHF World Championship tournaments and games played, playing 151 games over 20 World Championships. He was inducted into the IIHF Hall of Fame in 2026.

== Career statistics ==
=== Regular season and playoffs ===
			Regular season					Playoffs
Season	Team	League	GP	G	A	Pts	PIM	GP	G	A	Pts	PIM
1999–2000	HC Davos	SUI U20	21	3	4	7	8	—	—	—	—	—
2000–01	HC Davos	SUI U20	31	24	17	41	36	6	4	3	7	6
2000–01	HC Davos	NLA	3	0	1	1	0	—	—	—	—	—
2001–02	HC Davos	SUI U20	3	2	2	4	12	1	0	1	1	2
2001–02	HC Davos	NLA	38	5	3	8	26	6	1	0	1	4
2001–02	EHC Lenzerheide–Valbella	SUI.3	1	0	2	2	—	—	—	—	—	—
2002–03	HC Davos	NLA	40	6	11	17	18	17	0	2	2	10
2002–03	EHC Lenzerheide–Valbella	SUI.3	1	0	2	2	—	—	—	—	—	—
2003–04	HC Davos	NLA	47	6	16	22	40	6	0	1	1	2
2004–05	HC Davos	NLA	43	7	11	18	67	15	3	2	5	12
2005–06	HC Davos	NLA	44	7	14	21	50	15	4	1	5	12
2006–07	HC Davos	NLA	44	5	13	18	88	19	2	2	4	20
2007–08	HC Davos	NLA	49	11	15	26	46	13	5	3	8	8
2008–09	HC Davos	NLA	50	17	24	41	98	21	4	3	7	26
2009–10	Hartford Wolf Pack	AHL	64	8	6	14	37	—	—	—	—	—
2010–11	ZSC Lions	NLA	50	11	16	27	46	5	2	1	3	4
2011–12	ZSC Lions	NLA	48	14	17	31	60	15	5	9	14	6
2012–13	ZSC Lions	NLA	45	19	8	27	26	12	3	0	3	2
2013–14	HC Davos	NLA	49	8	21	29	44	4	1	1	2	0
2014–15	HC Davos	NLA	49	13	16	29	28	15	2	6	8	10
2015–16	HC Davos	NLA	50	14	27	41	30	9	6	2	8	10
2016–17	HC Davos	NLA	48	12	29	41	53	10	6	1	7	4
2017–18	HC Davos	NL	50	12	22	34	47	3	0	0	0	2
2018–19	HC Davos	NL	50	12	16	28	57	—	—	—	—	—
2019–20	HC Davos	NL	46	11	23	34	30	—	—	—	—	—
2020–21	HC Davos	NL	45	14	30	44	26	3	1	0	1	2
2021–22	HC Davos	NL	49	13	18	31	68	7	4	4	8	6
2022–23	HC Davos	NL	52	12	17	29	20	5	0	0	0	0
2023–24	HC Davos	NL	52	9	13	22	8	7	1	1	2	4
2024–25	HC Davos	NL	50	2	12	14	45	10	4	1	5	4
NL totals			1,091	240	393	633	1,021	217	54	40	94	170

=== International ===
Year	Team	Event	Result	GP	G	A	Pts	PIM
2001	Switzerland	WJC18	2nd place, silver medalist(s)	7	1	2	3	2
2002	Switzerland	WJC	4th	7	1	3	4	16
2003	Switzerland	WJC	7th	6	0	6	6	6
2004	Switzerland	WC	8th	7	1	1	2	6
2005	Switzerland	OGQ	Q	3	1	0	1	2
2005	Switzerland	WC	8th	6	0	0	0	2
2006	Switzerland	OG	6th	1	0	0	0	0
2006	Switzerland	WC	9th	6	1	1	2	8
2007	Switzerland	WC	8th	7	0	0	0	12
2008	Switzerland	WC	7th	7	2	3	5	2
2009	Switzerland	WC	9th	6	2	1	3	6
2010	Switzerland	OG	8th	5	0	0	0	0
2010	Switzerland	WC	5th	7	4	2	6	4
2011	Switzerland	WC	9th	6	1	1	2	4
2012	Switzerland	WC	11th	7	1	0	1	0
2013	Switzerland	WC	2nd place, silver medalist(s)	10	2	4	6	16
2014	Switzerland	OG	9th	4	0	0	0	0
2014	Switzerland	WC	10th	7	1	3	4	4
2015	Switzerland	WC	8th	8	1	1	2	0
2016	Switzerland	WC	11th	7	0	4	4	6
2017	Switzerland	WC	6th	8	3	2	5	14
2018	Switzerland	OG	10th	4	0	5	5	2
2019	Switzerland	WC	8th	8	2	2	4	2
2021	Switzerland	WC	6th	8	0	5	5	0
2022	Switzerland	OG	8th	5	2	0	2	2
2022	Switzerland	WC	5th	8	3	2	5	0
2023	Switzerland	WC	5th	8	4	1	5	4
2024	Switzerland	WC	2nd place, silver medalist(s)	10	0	5	5	10
2025	Switzerland	WC	2nd place, silver medalist(s)	10	4	0	4	2
Junior totals				20	2	11	13	24
Senior totals				173	35	43	78	108
