= Christopher Festarini =

Canadian ice hockey goaltender

- Born: June 3, 1993 (age 31); Oakville, Ontario, Canada
- Height: 6 ft 1 in (185 cm)
- Weight: 170 lb (77 kg; 12 st 2 lb)
- Position: Goaltender
- Caught: Left
- MHL team Former teams: Truro Bearcats; Niagara IceDogs
- Playing career: 2010–2018

Christopher Festarini (born June 3, 1993) is a Canadian former ice hockey goaltender.

Festarini competed at the 2010 World U-17 Hockey Challenge where he won the Silver Medal as a member of Team Ontario.

== Awards and honours ==
Honours	Year
World U-17 Hockey Challenge Silver Medal	2011
Dave Pinkney Trophy – OHL Lowest Team Goals Against (shared with Mark Visentin)	2011–12
