= Desfosses =

Desfosses or Desfossés is a surname of French origin. Notable people with the name include:

- Jean Desfossés, Canadian merchant
- Joseph Romain-Desfossés, French naval officer
- Joseph Desfosses, Canadian politician
- Kevin Desfossés, Canadian ice hockey player
- Raymond Desfossés, Canadian gangster
