= Marc-André Bourdon =

Canadian ice hockey player and coach

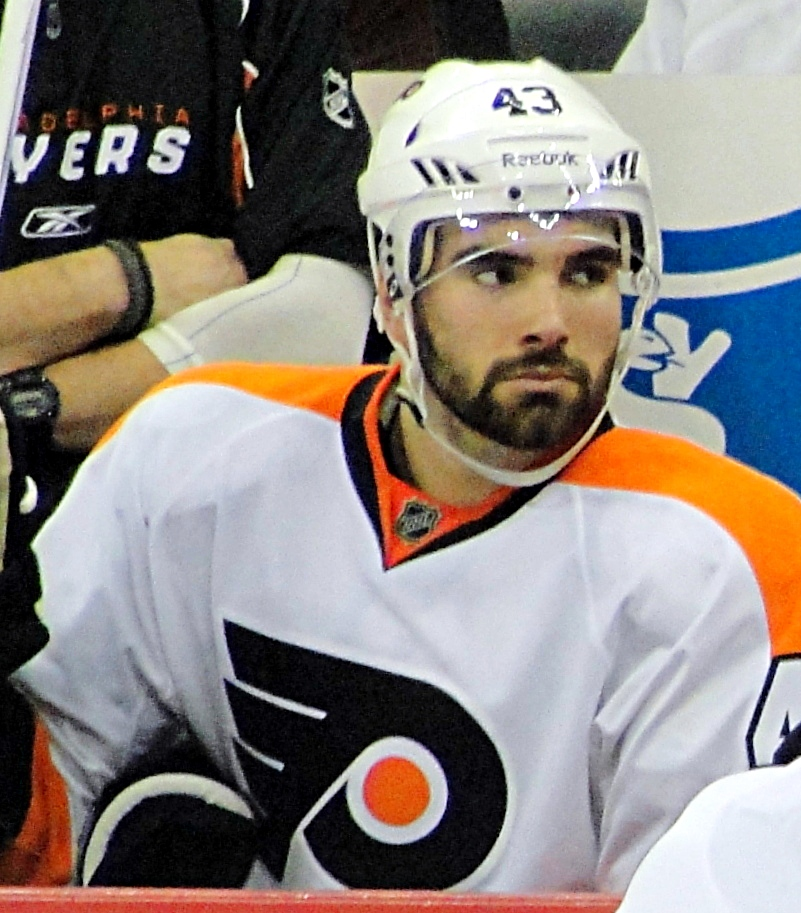
- With the Flyers in 2011.
- Born: September 17, 1989 (age 37) Saint-Hyacinthe, Quebec, Canada
- Height: 6 ft 0 in (183 cm)
- Weight: 206 lb (93 kg; 14 st 10 lb)
- Position: Defence
- Shot: Left
- Played for: Philadelphia Flyers
- NHL draft: 67th overall, 2008; Philadelphia Flyers
- Playing career: 2009–2014

Marc-André Bourdon (born September 17, 1989) is a Canadian former professional ice hockey defenceman who played in the National Hockey League (NHL). He was assistant coach for the Liberty University Flames Division 1 ACHA Hockey team from 2015 to 2017. He played for the Philadelphia Flyers during 2011–12 NHL season. Bourdon was selected by the Flyers in the third round (67th overall) of the 2008 NHL entry draft, and played 45 games in the NHL for the Flyers before injuries forced him to retire.

== Playing career ==
Bourdon played major junior hockey in the Quebec Major Junior Hockey League where he was known as a smooth skating, offensive defenceman. Big things were expected of Bourdon when he was drafted by the Philadelphia Flyers in the third round of the 2008 NHL entry draft, but after his first professional season of play, Bourdon was labeled a disappointment for contributing only 19 points in 61 games with the Adirondack Phantoms during the 2009–10 AHL season. Bourdon's continuing struggles during the 2010–11 AHL season resulted in his demotion to the ECHL where he finished the season with the Greenville Road Warriors.

After beginning the 2011–12 season with the Phantoms, Bourdon and Kevin Marshall were called up to the Flyers on November 21 after Chris Pronger and Braydon Coburn sustained injuries. Bourdon made his NHL debut that same day against the Carolina Hurricanes. Bourdon tallied his first NHL point and goal on December 13, scoring a game-winning goal against the Washington Capitals in a 5-1 Flyers win. The team was impressed with his NHL play, as scouts in the organization said that "flat out he has played better in the NHL than he ever did as a Phantom."

Bourdon signed a multi-year extension with the Flyers on August 8, 2012. No financial terms were disclosed for either deal, but CSNPhilly.com said Bourdon's pact was for two years and $1.225 million, an average annual value of $612.500. After being limited to 24 AHL games over the next two seasons due to concussions, Bourdon retired after the 2013–14 season.

== Career statistics ==
			Regular season					Playoffs
Season	Team	League	GP	G	A	Pts	PIM	GP	G	A	Pts	PIM
2006–07	Rouyn-Noranda Huskies	QMJHL	63	2	26	28	80	16	0	4	4	21
2007–08	Rouyn-Noranda Huskies	QMJHL	69	12	47	59	114	17	2	16	18	25
2008–09	Rouyn-Noranda Huskies	QMJHL	37	11	27	38	89	—	—	—	—	—
2008–09	Rimouski Océanic	QMJHL	17	7	15	22	23	13	1	12	13	25
2008–09	Rimouski Océanic	M-Cup	—	—	—	—	—	4	0	4	4	6
2009–10	Adirondack Phantoms	AHL	61	2	17	19	53	—	—	—	—	—
2010–11	Adirondack Phantoms	AHL	46	1	9	10	84	—	—	—	—	—
2010–11	Greenville Road Warriors	ECHL	5	0	2	2	14	10	0	3	3	16
2011–12	Adirondack Phantoms	AHL	18	1	3	4	31	—	—	—	—	—
2011–12	Philadelphia Flyers	NHL	45	4	3	7	52	1	0	0	0	0
2012–13	Adirondack Phantoms	AHL	17	1	3	4	59	—	—	—	—	—
2013–14	Adirondack Phantoms	AHL	7	0	3	3	12	—	—	—	—	—
NHL totals			45	4	3	7	52	1	0	0	0	0

== Awards and honours ==
- Canadian Major Junior Second All-Star Team (2007–08)
- Emile Bouchard Trophy (2007–08)
- QMJHL First All-Star Team (2007–08)
