= 2007–08 QMJHL season =

- League: Quebec Major Junior Hockey League
- Sport: Hockey
- Duration: Regular season September 13, 2007 – March 16, 2008; Playoffs; March 21, 2008 – May 9, 2008
- Teams: 18
- TV partner(s): Eastlink TV; TVA Sports; MATV

Draft
- Top draft pick: Simon Després
- Picked by: Saint John Sea Dogs

Regular season
- Jean Rougeau Trophy: Rouyn-Noranda Huskies (1)
- Season MVP: Francis Paré (Chicoutimi Saguenéens)
- Top scorer: Mathieu Perreault (Acadie-Bathurst Titan)

Playoffs
- Playoffs MVP: Claude Giroux (Olympiques)
- Finals champions: Gatineau Olympiques (5)
- Runners-up: Rouyn-Noranda Huskies

QMJHL seasons
- 2006–07 2008–09

2007–08 CHL season
- League: Canadian Hockey League
- Sport: Hockey
- Duration: OHL; Sept. 19, 2007 – Mar. 16, 2008; QMJHL; Sept. 13, 2007 – Mar. 16, 2008; WHL; Sept. 20, 2007 – Mar. 16, 2008
- Teams: 60
- TV partner(s): RDS; Rogers Sportsnet; Rogers TV; Shaw TV
- Season MVP: Justin Azevedo (Kitchener Rangers) (OHL)
- Top scorer: Justin Azevedo (Kitchener Rangers) (OHL)

Memorial Cup
- Finals champions: Spokane Chiefs (WHL) (2nd title)
- Runners-up: Kitchener Rangers (OHL)

The 2007–08 QMJHL season was the 39th season in the history of the Quebec Major Junior Hockey League. At the season-opening press conference, the QMJHL announced in partnership with Telus that all 630 regular season games would be available by Internet broadcast. The regular season started on September 13, 2007, and concluded on March 16, 2008. Eighteen teams played seventy games each. The Rouyn-Noranda Huskies finished first overall in the regular season winning their first Jean Rougeau Trophy. They would go on to win 12-straight playoff games before losing in five games in the finals to the Gatineau Olympiques, who captured their seventh President's Cup, and third in the last six seasons.

== Final standings ==
Note: GP = Games played; W = Wins; L = Losses; OTL = Overtime loss; SL = Shootout loss; PTS = Points; GF = Goals for; GA = Goals against; x = Clinched playoff berth; y = Clinched division title

Telus Division	GP	W	L	OTL	SL	Pts	GF	GA
y Rouyn-Noranda Huskies	70	47	20	2	1	97	294	238
x Baie-Comeau Drakkar	70	45	19	2	4	96	249	210
x Gatineau Olympiques	70	43	19	6	2	94	272	209
x Chicoutimi Saguenéens	70	37	25	2	6	82	235	203
x Quebec Remparts	70	38	28	1	3	80	256	225
x Shawinigan Cataractes	70	33	33	0	4	70	226	241
x Rimouski Océanic	70	33	36	1	0	67	227	235
x Val-d'Or Foreurs	70	27	34	3	6	63	203	264
x Victoriaville Tigres	70	29	37	2	2	62	224	276
Drummondville Voltigeurs	70	14	51	2	3	33	177	293

Eastern Division	GP	W	L	OTL	SL	Pts	GF	GA
y Halifax Mooseheads	70	42	23	0	5	89	278	241
x Saint John Sea Dogs	70	41	22	4	3	89	265	238
x Acadie-Bathurst Titan	70	41	25	2	2	86	289	241
x Cape Breton Screaming Eagles	70	40	24	3	3	86	242	230
x Lewiston Maineiacs	70	37	26	5	2	81	222	212
x St. John's Fog Devils	70	32	30	1	7	72	217	225
x P.E.I. Rocket	70	30	36	2	2	64	243	287
Moncton Wildcats	70	21	34	5	10	57	191	242

- Complete List of Standings.

== Scoring leaders ==
Note: GP = Games played; G = Goals; A = Assists; Pts = Points; PIM = Penalty minutes

Player	Team	GP	G	A	Pts	PIM
Mathieu Perreault	Acadie-Bathurst Titan	65	34	80	114	61
Claude Giroux	Gatineau Olympiques	55	38	68	106	37
Francis Paré	Chicoutimi Saguenéens	69	54	48	102	54
Jakub Voráček	Halifax Mooseheads	53	33	68	101	42
Dean Ouellet	Cape Breton Screaming Eagles	70	43	54	97	57
Christopher DiDomenico	Saint John Sea Dogs	70	39	56	95	103
Matthew Pistilli	Gatineau Olympiques	63	37	56	93	51
François Bouchard	Baie-Comeau Drakkar	68	36	56	92	70
Brett Morrison	Rouyn-Noranda Huskies	65	39	52	91	60
Geoff Walker	P.E.I. Rocket	69	38	52	90	52

== Leading goaltenders ==
Note: GP = Games played; Mins = Minutes played; W = Wins; L = Losses; GA = Goals allowed; SO = Shutouts; SV% = Save percentage; GAA = Goals against average

Player	Team	GP	Mins	W	L	GA	SO	SV%	GAA
Bobby Nadeau	Chicoutimi Saguenéens	46	2528	20	20	111	3	0.899	2.63
Jonathan Bernier	Lewiston Maineiacs	34	2024	18	15	92	0	0.908	2.73
Ryan Mior	Gatineau Olympiques	54	2943	30	20	136	6	0.900	2.77
Marco Cousineau	Baie-Comeau Drakkar	58	3226	34	19	151	4	0.903	2.81
Peter Delmas	Lewiston Maineiacs	34	1987	17	17	94	0	0.903	2.84

== Canada-Russia Challenge ==
The 2007 ADT Canada-Russia Challenge was hosted by the Chicoutimi Saguenéens and the Gatineau Olympiques. On November 19, 2007, the Russian Selects defeated the QMJHL All-stars 6–4 at the Centre Georges-Vézina. On November 21, 2007, the QMJHL All-stars defeated the Russian Selects 3–2 at the Robert Guertin Centre. Since the tournament began in 2003, the QMJHL All-stars have won six games, the Russian Selects have four wins.

== Playoffs ==
The top nine teams from the Telus division, and top seven teams from the Eastern division qualified for the playoffs. The ninth place team in the Telus division qualified in the Eastern division, and ranked by regular season points. All series will be best-of-seven. Divisions will cross over in the semifinals.

=== Overview ===
Division quarterfinals	Division semifinals
E1	Halifax	4
E8^{†}	Victoriaville	2
E1	Halifax	4
E4	Cape Breton	1
E4	Cape Breton	4
E5	Lewiston	2
Eastern Division
E2	Saint John	4
E7	P.E.I.	0
E2	Saint John	4
E3	Acadie-Bathurst	2
E3	Acadie-Bathurst	4
E6	St. John's	2
T1	Rouyn-Noranda	4
T8	Val-d'Or	0
T1	Rouyn-Noranda	4
T7	Rimouski	0
T2	Baie-Comeau	1
T7	Rimouski	4
Telus Division
T3	Gatineau	4
T6	Shawinigan	1
T3	Gatineau	4
T5	Québec	1
T4	Chicoutimi	2
T5	Québec	4

Semifinals
E1	Halifax	0
T3	Gatineau	4
T1	Rouyn-Noranda	4
E2	Saint John	0

Finals
T3	Gatineau	4
T1	Rouyn-Noranda	1

^{†}Victoriaville seeded 8th in Eastern division.

=== Division quarterfinals ===
==== (E1) Halifax Mooseheads vs. (E8) Victoriaville Tigres ====
March 21	Halifax Mooseheads	6 – 2	Victoriaville Tigres	Halifax Metro Centre

March 22	Halifax Mooseheads	11 – 1	Victoriaville Tigres	Halifax Metro Centre

March 26	Victoriaville Tigres	3 – 1	Halifax Mooseheads	Colisée Desjardins

March 27	Victoriaville Tigres	3 – 2	Halifax Mooseheads	Colisée Desjardins

March 29	Victoriaville Tigres	2 – 7	Halifax Mooseheads	Colisée Desjardins

March 31	Halifax Mooseheads	7 – 0	Victoriaville Tigres	Halifax Metro Centre

Halifax wins series 4 – 2

==== (E4) Cape Breton Screaming Eagles vs. (E5) Lewiston Maineiacs ====
March 21	Cape Breton Screaming Eagles	8 – 3	Lewiston Maineiacs	Centre 200
5:17 - pp - Jordan Clendenning (1); 6:56 - pp - Alex Lamontagne (1); 11:22 - Joey Haddad (1); 18:42 - Joey Haddad (2)		First period	Danick Paquette (1) - 15:09
7:16 - Dean Ouellet (1); 18:38 - Olivier Dame-Malka (1)		Second period	Stefan Chaput (1) - 19:33
1:34 - pp - Robert Slaney (1); 1:48 - pp - Nick MacNeil (1)		Third period	Tom Michalik (1) - 10:07
Olivier Roy (25 saves / 28 shots)		Goalie stats	Jonathan Bernier (20 saves / 26 shots); Kirk Rafuse (8 saves / 10 shots)

March 22	Cape Breton Screaming Eagles	3 – 0	Lewiston Maineiacs	Centre 200

March 25	Lewiston Maineiacs	2 – 1	Cape Breton Screaming Eagles	Androscoggin Bank Colisée

March 26	Lewiston Maineiacs	1 – 4	Cape Breton Screaming Eagles	Androscoggin Bank Colisée

March 28	Lewiston Maineiacs	5 – 2	Cape Breton Screaming Eagles	Androscoggin Bank Colisée

March 31	Cape Breton Screaming Eagles	2 – 1	OT	Lewiston Maineiacs	Centre 200

Cape Breton wins series 4 – 2

==== (E2) Saint John Sea Dogs vs. (E7) P.E.I. Rocket ====
March 21	Saint John Sea Dogs	10 – 4	P.E.I. Rocket	Harbour Station

March 22	Saint John Sea Dogs	7 – 3	P.E.I. Rocket	Harbour Station

March 25	P.E.I. Rocket	4 – 6	Saint John Sea Dogs	Charlottetown Civic Centre

March 26	P.E.I. Rocket	3 – 6	Saint John Sea Dogs	Charlottetown Civic Centre

Saint John wins series 4 – 0

==== (E3) Acadie-Bathurst Titan vs. (E6) St. John's Fog Devils ====
March 21	Acadie-Bathurst Titan	8 – 5	St. John's Fog Devils	K. C. Irving Regional Centre
No scoring		First period	Jean-Simon Allard (1) - 1:10
3:32 - Rémi Blanchard (1); 7:19 - Tomy Joly (1); 13:19 - Ryan Graham (1); 14:53 - Mathieu Perreault (1); 16:52 - Ryan Graham (2); 18:04 - Jonathan Laberge (1)		Second period	Maxime Pomerleau (1) - pp - 9:36; Jean-Simon Allard (2) - pp - 10:54; Phil Mangan (1) - sh - 19:12
2:40 - Tomy Joly (2); 15:20 - Drew Paris (1)		Third period	T. J. Brennan (1) - 9:16
Timo Pielmeier (29 saves / 35 shots); Jake Allen (6 saves / 8 shots)		Goalie stats	Nicolas Champion (26 saves / 31 shots)

March 22	Acadie-Bathurst Titan	5 – 4	St. John's Fog Devils	K. C. Irving Regional Centre

March 25	St. John's Fog Devils	6 – 5	Acadie-Bathurst Titan	Mile One Stadium

March 26	St. John's Fog Devils	6 – 1	Acadie-Bathurst Titan	Mile One Stadium

March 28	St. John's Fog Devils	2 – 7	Acadie-Bathurst Titan	Mile One Stadium

March 31	Acadie-Bathurst Titan	4 – 3	St. John's Fog Devils	K. C. Irving Regional Centre

Acadie-Bathurst wins series 4 – 2

==== (T1) Rouyn-Noranda Huskies vs. (T8) Val-d'Or Foreurs ====
March 21	Rouyn-Noranda Huskies	8 – 3	Val-d'Or Foreurs	Aréna Dave Keon
5:09 - pp - Marc-André Bourdon (1); 7:36 - Tyler Hawes (1)		First period	Anže Ropret (1) - 3:39; Maxim Guérin (1) - 13:29
7:45 - pp - Michael Dubuc (1); 11:38 - Pier-Luc Giguère (1)		Second period	No scoring
6:42 - Sébastien Piché (1); 12:12 - Brett Morrison (1); 13:32 - Michael Dubuc (2); 17:31 - Hugo Carpentier (1)		Third period	Maxime Sauvé (1) - 9:37
Maxime Gougeon (33 saves / 36 shots)		Goalie stats	Raphaël D'Orso (32 saves / 39 shots); Paul Dorsey (5 saves / 6 shots)

March 22	Rouyn-Noranda Huskies	9 – 0	Val-d'Or Foreurs	Aréna Dave Keon
2:58 - Michael Dubuc (3); 10:29 - Jarrad Struthers (1); 14:16 - Michael Dubuc (4)		First period	No scoring
8:50 - sh - Maxime Macenauer (1); 13:04 - Brett Morrison (2)		Second period	No scoring
0:36 - Michael Dubuc (5); 1:54 - Jeff Desjardins (1); 2:26 - Jean-Sébastien Bérubé (1); 19:39 - pp - Jarrad Struthers (2)		Third period	No scoring
Maxime Gougeon (23 saves / 23 shots)		Goalie stats	Raphaël D'Orso (24 saves / 29 shots); Paul Dorsey (14 saves / 18 shots)

March 25	Val-d'Or Foreurs	1 – 6	Rouyn-Noranda Huskies	Centre Air Creebec
No scoring		First period	Sébastien Piché (2) - 1:00; Maxime Macenauer (2) - pp - 17:58
16:11 - pp - Jonathan Hazen (1)		Second period	Michael Dubuc (6) - 2:26; Maxime Macenauer (3) - pp - 9:10; Hugo Carpentier (2) - 17:16
No scoring		Third period	Alex Émond (1) - 2:18
Raphaël D'Orso (25 saves / 31 shots)		Goalie stats	Maxime Gougeon (25 saves / 26 shots)

March 26	Val-d'Or Foreurs	4 – 5	OT	Rouyn-Noranda Huskies	Centre Air Creebec
7:40 - pp - Martin Thibeault (1); 9:12 - Jonathan Hazen (2)		First period		Brad Ouskun (1) - 10:38
No scoring		Second period		Michael Dubuc (7) - 9:40; Yannick Riendeau (1) - 10:55
0:28 - pp - Maxime Sauvé (2); 19:53 - pp - Marc-André Côté (1)		Third period		Jarrad Struthers (3) - 4:21
No scoring		First overtime period		Michael Dubuc (8) - 16:36
Raphaël D'Orso (33 saves / 38 shots)		Goalie stats		Maxime Gougeon (43 saves / 47 shots)

Rouyn-Noranda wins series 4 – 0

==== (T2) Baie-Comeau Drakkar vs. (T7) Rimouski Océanic ====
March 22	Baie-Comeau Drakkar	0 – 3	Rimouski Océanic	Centre Henry-Leonard

March 23	Baie-Comeau Drakkar	5 – 2	Rimouski Océanic	Centre Henry-Leonard

March 25	Rimouski Océanic	2 – 1	OT	Baie-Comeau Drakkar	Colisée de Rimouski

March 26	Rimouski Océanic	3 – 1	Baie-Comeau Drakkar	Colisée de Rimouski

March 28	Baie-Comeau Drakkar	2 – 5	Rimouski Océanic	Centre Henry-Leonard

Rimouski wins series 4 – 1

==== (T3) Gatineau Olympiques vs. (T6) Shawinigan Cataractes ====
March 21	Gatineau Olympiques	4 – 3	Shawinigan Cataractes	Centre Robert Guertin
8:25 - Hubert Labrie (1)		First period	Antoine Houde-Caron (1) - pp - 12:52
1:07 - Claude Giroux (1); 19:19 - pp - Paul Byron (1)		Second period	Antoine Houde-Caron (2) - 11:52
9:23 - Mike Stinziani (1)		Third period	Dave Labrecque (1) - pp - 1:04
Ryan Mior (31 saves / 34 shots)		Goalie stats	Kevin Maletto (22 saves / 26 shots)

March 22	Gatineau Olympiques	9 – 3	Shawinigan Cataractes	Centre Robert Guertin
2:03 - pp - Matthew Pistilli (1); 16:37 - pp - Jean-Philip Chabot (1); 19:52 - Claude Giroux (2)		First period	Nick Petersen (1) - pp - 18:44
6:01 - Darryl Smith (1); 12:48 - Travis Stacey (1)		Second period	Pierre-Alexandre Vandall (1) - pp - 9:39
7:42 - pp - Matthew Pistilli (2); 10:28 - pp - Michael Stinziani (2); 11:53 - Jean-Philip Chabot (2); 19:59 - pp - Nicholas Vallières-Mayer (1)		Third period	Sean Smyth (1) - sh - 11:11
Ryan Mior (17 saves / 20 shots)		Goalie stats	Kevin Maletto (28 saves / 34 shots); Gabriel Girard (7 saves / 10 shots)

March 25	Shawinigan Cataractes	5 – 1	Gatineau Olympiques	Aréna Jacques Plante
No scoring		First period	No scoring
8:12 - pp - Nick Petersen (2); 9:18 - pp - Pierre-Alexandre Vandall (2)		Second period	No scoring
4:16 - Nick Petersen (3); 7:40 - Patrick Bernier (1); 17:23 - Nick Petersen (4)		Third period	Darryl Smith (2) - pp - 12:13
Kevin Maletto (27 saves / 28 shots)		Goalie stats	Ryan Mior (26 saves / 31 shots)

March 26	Shawinigan Cataractes	2 – 6	Gatineau Olympiques	Aréna Jacques Plante
17:18 - pp - Charles-Olivier Roussel (1)		First period	Darryl Smith (3) - 1:52; Paul Byron (2) - pp - 6:20; Darryl Smith (4) - pp - 6:37
No scoring		Second period	Gerrit Fauser (1) - sh - 5:21
13:28 - Patrick Bernier (2)		Third period	Paul Byron (3) - 18:20; Claude Giroux (3) - en - 18:40
Kevin Maletto (30 saves / 35 shots)		Goalie stats	Ryan Mior (22 saves / 24 shots)

March 28	Gatineau Olympiques	5 – 2	Shawinigan Cataractes	Centre Robert Guertin
No scoring		First period	Simon Lacroix (1) - pp - 14:50; Nick Petersen (5) - pp - 17:38
6:42 - pp - Matthew Pistilli (3)		Second period	No scoring
6:24 - Claude Giroux (4); 8:09 - pp - Matthew Pistilli (4); 15:56 - pp - Jean-Philip Chabot (3); 19:04 - en - Takuma Kawai (1)		Third period	No scoring
Ryan Mior (30 saves / 32 shots)		Goalie stats	Kevin Maletto (22 saves / 26 shots)

Gatineau wins series 4 – 1

==== (T4) Chicoutimi Saguenéens vs. (T5) Quebec Remparts ====
March 21	Chicoutimi Saguenéens	1 – 2	OT	Quebec Remparts	Centre Georges-Vézina
No scoring		First period		No scoring
No scoring		Second period		Angelo Esposito (1) - sh - 19:03
7:13 - Francis Paré (1)		Third period		No scoring
No scoring		First overtime period		David Gilbert (1) - 10:42
Bobby Nadeau (21 saves / 23 shots)		Goalie stats		Kevin Desfossés (40 saves / 41 shots)

March 22	Chicoutimi Saguenéens	10 – 1	Quebec Remparts	Centre Georges-Vézina

March 25	Quebec Remparts	6 – 1	Chicoutimi Saguenéens	Colisée Pepsi

March 26	Quebec Remparts	5 – 1	Chicoutimi Saguenéens	Colisée Pepsi

March 28	Chicoutimi Saguenéens	7 – 1	Quebec Remparts	Centre Georges-Vézina

March 31	Quebec Remparts	3 – 1	Chicoutimi Saguenéens	Colisée Pepsi

Quebec wins series 4 – 2

=== Division semifinals ===
==== (E1) Halifax Mooseheads vs. (E4) Cape Breton Screaming Eagles ====
April 4	Halifax Mooseheads	4 – 2	Cape Breton Screaming Eagles	Halifax Metro Centre

April 5	Halifax Mooseheads	5 – 4	Cape Breton Screaming Eagles	Halifax Metro Centre

April 8	Cape Breton Screaming Eagles	3 – 4	3OT	Halifax Mooseheads	Centre 200

April 9	Cape Breton Screaming Eagles	4 – 3	OT	Halifax Mooseheads	Centre 200

April 11	Halifax Mooseheads	5 – 2	Cape Breton Screaming Eagles	Halifax Metro Centre

Halifax wins series 4 – 1

==== (E2) Saint John Sea Dogs vs. (E3) Acadie-Bathurst Titan ====
April 4	Saint John Sea Dogs	4 – 3	Acadie-Bathurst Titan	Harbour Station

April 5	Saint John Sea Dogs	5 – 2	Acadie-Bathurst Titan	Harbour Station

April 8	Acadie-Bathurst Titan	4 – 2	Saint John Sea Dogs	K. C. Irving Regional Centre

April 9	Acadie-Bathurst Titan	0 – 5	Saint John Sea Dogs	K. C. Irving Regional Centre

April 12	Saint John Sea Dogs	4 – 6	Acadie-Bathurst Titan	Harbour Station

April 13	Acadie-Bathurst Titan	4 – 5	OT	Saint John Sea Dogs	K. C. Irving Regional Centre

Saint John wins series 4 – 2

==== (T1) Rouyn-Noranda Huskies vs. (T7) Rimouski Océanic ====
April 4	Rouyn-Noranda Huskies	4 – 3	OT	Rimouski Océanic	Aréna Dave Keon
No scoring		First period		Pierre-Alexandre Joncas (2) - 5:28; Patrice Cormier (3) - 10:54
18:36 - Hugo Carpentier (3)		Second period		Jordan Caron (2) - 1:49
13:00 - Pier-Luc Champagne (1); 19:27 - Hugo Carpentier (4)		Third period		No scoring
18:06 - Hugo Carpentier (5)		First overtime period		No scoring
Maxime Gougeon (31 saves / 34 shots)		Goalie stats		Jean-Christophe Blanchard (32 saves / 36 shots)

April 5	Rouyn-Noranda Huskies	2 – 1	2OT	Rimouski Océanic	Aréna Dave Keon
11:07 - Hugo Carpentier (6)		First period		No scoring
No scoring		Second period		Jordan Caron (3) - 5:39
No scoring		Third period		No scoring
11:57 - pp - Maxime Macenauer (4)		Second overtime period		No scoring
Maxime Gougeon (56 saves / 57 shots)		Goalie stats		Jean-Christophe Blanchard (31 saves / 33 shots)

April 8	Rimouski Océanic	3 – 4	Rouyn-Noranda Huskies	Colisée de Rimouski
No scoring		First period	Pier-Luc Giguère (2) - 5:44; Brett Morrison (3) - 16:20; Yannick Riendeau (2) - pp - 19:56
4:13 - Philippe Cornet (3)		Second period	No scoring
6:40 - Maxime Gratchev (2); 7:36 - Michael Frolík (2)		Third period	Hugo Carpentier (7) - 14:02
Jean-Christophe Blanchard (26 saves / 30 shots)		Goalie stats	Maxime Gougeon (32 saves / 35 shots)

April 9	Rimouski Océanic	1 – 6	Rouyn-Noranda Huskies	Colisée de Rimouski
No scoring		First period	Jarrad Struthers (4) - 17:29
No scoring		Second period	No scoring
11:17 - pp - Patrice Cormier (4)		Third period	Yannick Riendeau (3) - 1:39; Hugo Carpentier (8) - 3:44; Tyler Hawes (2) - 4:01; Brett Morrison (4) - pp - 13:25; Michael Dubuc (9) - 18:45
Jean-Christophe Blanchard (30 saves / 36 shots)		Goalie stats	Maxime Gougeon (27 saves / 28 shots)

Rouyn-Noranda wins series 4 – 0

==== (T3) Gatineau Olympiques vs. (T5) Quebec Remparts ====
April 4	Gatineau Olympiques	3 – 1	Quebec Remparts	Centre Robert Guertin
10:21 - pp - Matthew Pistilli (5); 13:38 - Paul Byron (4)		First period	No scoring
No scoring		Second period	Kelsey Tessier (5) - 2:07
12:53 - Darryl Smith (5)		Third period	No scoring
Ryan Mior (18 saves / 19 shots)		Goalie stats	Kevin Desfossés (20 saves / 23 shots)

April 5	Gatineau Olympiques	5 – 2	Quebec Remparts	Centre Robert Guertin
No scoring		First period	Mikhail Stefanovich (3) - pp - 4:53; Mathieu Loisel (3) - 8:19
12:27 - Paul Byron (5)		Second period	No scoring
10:46 - pp - Jean-Philip Chabot (4); 10:53 - Paul Byron (6); 13:14 - Claude Giroux (5); 19:53 - pp - Patrik Prokop (1)		Third period	No scoring
Ryan Mior (14 saves / 16 shots)		Goalie stats	Kevin Desfossés (34 saves / 39 shots)

April 8	Quebec Remparts	2 – 6	Gatineau Olympiques	Colisée Pepsi
		First period	Matthew Pistilli (6) - 2:46; Nicolas Boyer (1) - 10:46; Matthew Pistilli (7) - 14:35
		Second period	Darryl Smith (6) - 6:16; Michael Stinziani (3) - 9:52
1:33 - sh - Christophe Poirier (2); 10:20 - pp - Félix Petit (1)		Third period	Claude Giroux (6) - en - 16:39
Kevin Desfossés (10 saves / 15 shots); Mickaël Audette (10 saves / 10 shots)		Goalie stats	Ryan Mior (17 saves / 19 shots)

April 9	Quebec Remparts	8 – 4	Gatineau Olympiques	Colisée Pepsi
0:57 - Kelsey Tessier (6); 2:48 - Hubert Genest (1); 16:49 - Benjamin Lecomte (1)		First period	No scoring
4:54 - pp - Jonathan Audy-Marchessault (1); 12:46 - pp - Hubert Genest (2); 15:33 - Darick Ste-Marie (1)		Second period	Michael Stinziani (4) - 7:36; Jean-Philip Chabot (5) - 11:00; Gerrit Fauser (2) - 11:16
8:43 - Mikhail Stefanovich (4); 17:29 - en - Marc-Olivier Vallerand (1)		Third period	Paul Byron (7) - 1:09
Kevin Desfossés (24 saves / 28 shots)		Goalie stats	Ryan Mior (14 saves / 18 shots); Maxime Clermont (6 saves / 9 shots)

April 11	Gatineau Olympiques	5 – 2	Quebec Remparts	Centre Robert Guertin
0:42 - Paul Byron (8)		First period	No scoring
19:18 - Claude Giroux (7)		Second period	Kelsey Tessier (7) - 18:35
9:21 - Claude Giroux (8); 18:28 - Matthew Pistilli (8); 18:59 - en - Claude Giroux (9)		Third period	Kelsey Tessier (8) - pp - 16:46
Ryan Mior (15 saves / 17 shots)		Goalie stats	Kevin Desfossés (23 saves / 27 shots)

Gatineau wins series 4 – 1

=== Semifinals ===
==== (E1) Halifax Mooseheads vs. (T3) Gatineau Olympiques ====
April 19	Halifax Mooseheads	1 – 2	OT	Gatineau Olympiques	Halifax Metro Centre

April 20	Halifax Mooseheads	3 – 4	2OT	Gatineau Olympiques	Halifax Metro Centre

April 23	Gatineau Olympiques	6 – 1	Halifax Mooseheads	Centre Robert Guertin

April 24	Gatineau Olympiques	5 – 2	Halifax Mooseheads	Centre Robert Guertin

Gatineau wins series 4 – 0

==== (T1) Rouyn-Noranda Huskies vs. (E2) Saint John Sea Dogs ====
April 18	Rouyn-Noranda Huskies	5 – 3	Saint John Sea Dogs	Aréna Dave Keon

April 19	Rouyn-Noranda Huskies	7 – 5	Saint John Sea Dogs	Aréna Dave Keon

April 22	Saint John Sea Dogs	1 – 8	Rouyn-Noranda Huskies	Harbour Station

April 23	Saint John Sea Dogs	4 – 5	Rouyn-Noranda Huskies	Harbour Station

Rouyn-Noranda wins series 4 – 0

=== QMJHL Championship ===
==== (T1) Rouyn-Noranda Huskies vs. (E4) Gatineau Olympiques ====
May 2	Rouyn-Noranda Huskies	2 – 6	Gatineau Olympiques	Aréna Dave Keon

May 3	Rouyn-Noranda Huskies	6 – 2	Gatineau Olympiques	Aréna Dave Keon

May 6	Gatineau Olympiques	10 – 4	Rouyn-Noranda Huskies	Centre Robert Guertin

May 7	Gatineau Olympiques	4 – 1	Rouyn-Noranda Huskies	Centre Robert Guertin

May 9	Rouyn-Noranda Huskies	3 – 7	Gatineau Olympiques	Aréna Dave Keon

Gatineau wins series 4 – 1

== All-star teams ==
First team

- Goaltender - Kevin Desfossés, Quebec Remparts
- Defence - Marc-André Bourdon, Rouyn-Noranda & Marc-André Dorion, Baie-Comeau
- Left winger - Stefano Giliati, Lewiston Maineiacs
- Centreman - Francis Paré, Chicoutimi Saguenéens
- Right winger - Claude Giroux, Gatineau Olympiques

Second team

- Goaltender - Marco Cousineau, Baie-Comeau Drakkar
- Defence - Kevin Marshall, Lewiston Maineiacs & Ivan Vishnevskiy, Rouyn-Noranda Huskies
- Left winger - Michaël Dubuc, Rouyn-Noranda Huskies
- Centreman - Mathieu Perreault, Acadie-Bathurst Titan
- Right winger - Jakub Voracek, Halifax Mooseheads

Rookie team

- Goaltender - Olivier Roy, Cape Breton Screaming Eagles
- Defence - Simon Després, Saint John Sea Dogs & Samuel Groulx, Quebec Remparts
- Left winger - Nicolas Deschamps, Chicoutimi Saguenéens
- Centreman - Tomas Knotek, Halifax Mooseheads
- Right winger - Jacob Lagacé, Chicoutimi Saguenéens
- Hall of Fame opens doors to four new all-time greats amidst the Golden Puck Awards Gala.

== Trophies and awards ==
Team

- President's Cup - Playoff Champions: Gatineau Olympiques
- Jean Rougeau Trophy - Regular Season Champions: Rouyn-Noranda Huskies
- Luc Robitaille Trophy - Team that scored the most goals: Rouyn-Noranda Huskies
- Robert Lebel Trophy - Team with best GAA: Chicoutimi Saguenéens

Player

- Michel Brière Memorial Trophy - Most Valuable Player: Francis Paré, Chicoutimi Saguenéens
- Jean Béliveau Trophy - Top Scorer: Mathieu Perreault, Acadie-Bathurst Titan
- Guy Lafleur Trophy - Playoff MVP : Claude Giroux, Gatineau Olympiques
- Telus Cup – Offensive - Offensive Player of the Year
- Telus Cup – Defensive - Defensive Player of the Year
- Jacques Plante Memorial Trophy - Best GAA: Bobby Nadeau, Chicoutimi Saguenéens
- Guy Carbonneau Trophy - Best Defensive Forward: Olivier Fortier, Rimouski Océanic
- Emile Bouchard Trophy - Defenceman of the Year: Marc-André Bourdon, Rouyn-Noranda Huskies
- Kevin Lowe Trophy - Best Defensive Defenceman: Mathieu Bolduc, Chicoutimi Saguenéens
- Mike Bossy Trophy - Best Pro Prospect: Mikhail Stefanovich, Quebec Remparts
- RDS Cup - Rookie of the Year: Olivier Roy, Cape Breton Screaming Eagles
- Michel Bergeron Trophy - Offensive Rookie of the Year: Nicolas Deschamps, Chicoutimi Saguenéens
- Raymond Lagacé Trophy - Defensive Rookie of the Year: Olivier Roy, Cape Breton Screaming Eagles
- Frank J. Selke Memorial Trophy - Most sportsmanlike player: Cédric Lalonde-McNicoll, Shawinigan Cataractes
- QMJHL Humanitarian of the Year - Humanitarian of the Year: Chris Morehouse, Moncton Wildcats
- Marcel Robert Trophy - Best Scholastic Player: Robert Slaney, Cape Breton Screaming Eagles
- Paul Dumont Trophy - Personality of the Year: Martin Mondou, Shawinigan Cataractes

Executive

- Ron Lapointe Trophy - Coach of the Year: Pascal Vincent, Cape Breton Screaming Eagles
- Maurice Filion Trophy - General Manager of the Year: Jacques Beaulieu, Saint John Sea Dogs
- John Horman Trophy - Executive of the Year: Mario Arsenault, Rimouski Océanic
- Jean Sawyer Trophy - Marketing Director of the Year: Yves Bonneau, Victoriaville Tigres

== See also ==
- 2008 Memorial Cup
- 2008 NHL entry draft
- 2007–08 OHL season
- 2007–08 WHL season

Preceded by 2006–07 QMJHL season	QMJHL seasons	Succeeded by 2008–09 QMJHL season
