= 2025–26 MHL season =

58th season of the Maritime Junior Hockey League

- League: MHL
- Sport: Junior ice hockey
- Duration: Preseason; August – September; Regular season September – March; Postseason; March – April
- Games: 312
- Teams: 12
- Total attendance: 307,184
- TV partner: Eastlink Community TV
- Streaming partner: FloSports

2025 MHL entry draft
- Top draft pick: Ethan Jones
- Picked by: Valley Wildcats

Metalfab Cup
- League champions: Truro Bearcats
- Runners-up: Edmundston Blizzard

Seasons
- ← 2024–25 2026–27 →

The 2025–26 MHL season was the 58th season of the Maritime Junior Hockey League (MHL).

The Truro Bearcats won their won their fifth league championship. Truro and the Summerside Western Capitals both competed for the national championship Centennial Cup in Summerside, Prince Edward Island. Summerside eliminated Truro in the quarterfinal and went on to lose in the final against the Niverville Nighthawks of the Manitoba Junior Hockey League (MJHL).

Summerside defenceman Simon Mullen was named Defenceman of the Year by the Canadian Junior Hockey League.

The Edmundston Blizzard appointed Michael Ward as Head Coach. The Miramichi Timberwolves appointed Shawn Evans as Head Coach. The Chaleur Lightning appointed Matt Wright as Head Coach, replacing Kyle McAllister, and George MacIntyre as General Manager.

The MHL and Hockey Canada launched the Aligned Rules pilot project, according to which the league adopted the Quebec Maritimes Junior Hockey League (QMJHL) rule book and International Ice Hockey Federation (IIHF) Rule 202 on facial protection.

== Regular season ==
The regular season ran from 11 September 2025 through 8 March 2026. Each of the twelve teams played 52 regular season games, including eight against teams in the same division and two against teams in the other division. The top four teams in each division advanced to the playoffs.

North division
Rank	Team	GP	W	L	OTL	SOL	Pts
1	Summerside Western Capitals	52	32	12	5	3	72
2	Truro Bearcats	52	34	14	3	1	72
3	Pictou County Crushers	52	31	16	4	1	67
4	Amherst Ramblers	52	32	19	1	0	65
5	Yarmouth Mariners	52	19	25	4	4	46
6	Valley Wildcats	52	12	38	2	0	26

Source: "2025–26 MHL standings". hockeydb.com.

South division
Rank	Team	GP	W	L	OTL	SOL	Pts
1	Grand Falls Rapids	52	31	15	5	1	68
2	West Kent Steamers	52	30	14	5	3	68
3	Edmundston Blizzard	52	30	16	3	3	66
4	Chaleur Lightning	52	31	18	2	1	65
5	Campbellton Tigers	52	15	29	6	2	38
6	Miramichi Timberwolves	52	15	33	3	1	34

Source: "2025–26 MHL standings". hockeydb.com.

== Post-season ==
2026 League championship
Metalfab Cup

Tournament details
- Dates: 13 March – 1 May
- Teams: 8
- Defending champions: Edmundston Blizzard

Final positions
- Champions: Truro Bearcats (5th title)
- Runners-up: Edmundston Blizzard
- Semifinalists: Chaleur Lightning; Summerside Western Capitals

Tournament statistics
- Games played: 39
- Goals scored: 242 (6.21 per game)
- Attendance: 68,275 (1,751 per game)

Awards
- Playoff MVP: Jayden Connors

Official website
- 2026 MHL playoffs

Quarterfinals
Grand Falls Rapids	1
Chaleur Lightning	4
West Kent Steamers	0
Edmundston Blizzard	4
Truro Bearcats	4
Pictou County Crushers	1
Summerside	4
Amherst Ramblers	3

Semifinals
Chaleur Lightning	2
Edmundston Blizzard	4
Truro Bearcats	4
Summerside	3

Finals
Edmundston Blizzard	1
Truro Bearcats	4

Source: "MHL 2026 playoffs". themhl.ca. Maritime Junior Hockey League.

=== Quarterfinal: Grand Falls Rapids v. Chaleur Lightning ===
The Chaleur Lightning, having finished the regular season 4th in the South division, eliminated the 1st-place Grand Falls Rapids in 5 games.

13 March	Chaleur	4:3	Grand Falls	E. & P. Sénéchal Centre	Recap

15 March	Grand Falls	3:6	Chaleur	KC Irving Regional Centre	Recap

18 March	Chaleur	4:5	2OT	Grand Falls	E. & P. Sénéchal Centre	Recap

20 March	Grand Falls	1:3	Chaleur	KC Irving Regional Centre	Recap

22 March	Chaleur	5:4	OT	Grand Falls	E. & P. Sénéchal Centre	Recap

Chaleur Lightning win series 4:1

=== Quarterfinal: West Kent Steamers v. Edmundston Blizzard ===
The 3rd-place Edmundston Blizzard swept the 2nd-place Edmundston Blizzard in 4 straight games.

14 March	Edmundston	5:2	West Kent	J. K. Irving Centre	Recap

17 March	West Kent	4:9	Edmundston	Centre Jean Daigle	Recap

19 March	Edmundston	4:3	West Kent	J. K. Irving Centre	Recap

21 March	West Kent	2:3	Edmundston	Centre Jean Daigle	Recap

Edmundston Blizzard win series 4:0

=== Quarterfinal: Truro Bearcats v. Pictou County Crushers ===
The 2nd-place Truro Bearcats defeated the 3rd-place Pictou County Crushers in 4 games to 1.

13 March	Pictou County	0:6	Truro	Rath Eastlink Community Centre	Recap

15 March	Truro	5:1	Pictou County	Pictou County Wellness Centre	Recap

17 March	Pictou County	1:5	Truro	Rath Eastlink Community Centre	Recap

19 March	Truro	3:4	Pictou County	Pictou County Wellness Centre	Recap

21 March	Pictou County	1:2	2OT	Truro	Rath Eastlink Community Centre	Recap

Truro Bearcats win series 4:1

=== Quarterfinal: Summerside Western Capitals v. Amherst Ramblers ===
The 1st-place Summerside Western Capitals defeated the 4th-place Amherst Ramblers in 4 games to 3.

14 March	Amherst	2:3	Summerside	Credit Union Place	Recap

16 March	Summerside	2:4	Amherst	Amherst Stadium	Recap

19 March	Amherst	1:0	OT	Summerside	Credit Union Place	Recap

21 March	Summerside	5:4	2OT	Amherst	Amherst Stadium	Recap

23 March	Amherst	4:3	Summerside	Credit Union Place	Recap

26 March	Summerside	9:3	Amherst	Amherst Stadium	Recap

28 March	Amherst	0:1	Summerside	Credit Union Place	Recap

Summerside Western Capitals win series 4:3

=== Semifinal: Chaleur Lightning v. Edmundston Blizzard ===
The Edmundston Blizzard defeated the Chaleur Lightning 4 games to 2 to advance to the final round.

31 March	Chaleur	3:6	Edmundston	Centre Jean Daigle	Recap

2 April	Edmundston	4:2	Chaleur	KC Irving Regional Centre	Recap

4 April	Chaleur	5:4	Edmundston	Centre Jean Daigle	Recap

7 April	Edmundston	3:4	2OT	Chaleur	KC Irving Regional Centre	Recap
17:36 (1)		First period		(1) 05:23
17:44 (2)		Second period		(2) 08:51 (3) 16:24
04:21 (3)		Third period
		Second overtime period		(4) 06:34

9 April	Chaleur	2:4	Edmundston	Centre Jean Daigle	Recap
		First period	(1) 05:59
03:34 (1)		Second period	(2) 07:08 (3) 11:51
13:32 (2)		Third period	(4) 10:33

11 April	Edmundston	6:1	Chaleur	KC Irving Regional Centre	Recap
		First period	(1) 12:26
11:04 (1); 15:29 (2); 18:45 (3)		Second period
01:55 (4); 03:35 (5) power play 08:48 (6)		Third period

Edmundston Blizzard win series 4:2

=== Semifinal: Truro Bearcats v. Summerside Western Capitals ===
The Truro Bearcats defeated the Summerside Western Capitals 4 games to 3 to advance to the final round.

2 April	Truro	2:1	OT	Summerside	Credit Union Place	Recap
		First period
06:42 (1)		Second period
		Third period		(1) 19:30 power play
09:11 (2)		First overtime period

4 April	Summerside	1:3	Truro	Rath Eastlink Community Centre	Recap
01:41 (1)		First period
		Second period	(1) 09:52 (2) 16:06
		Third period	(3) 19:24 empty net

6 April	Truro	0:3	Summerside	Credit Union Place	Recap
		First period
		Second period	(1) 05:29 (2) 16:17
		Third period	(3) 01:00

8 April	Summerside	0:2	Truro	Rath Eastlink Community Centre	Recap
		First period	(1) 07:27
		Second period
		Third period	(2) 19:41

10 April	Truro	2:4	Summerside	Credit Union Place	Recap
		First period	(1) 05:22 (2) 07:49 (3) 10:35 (4) 13:29
00:21 (1) power play 14:21 (2)		Second period
		Third period

12 April	Summerside	2:1	Truro	Rath Eastlink Community Centre	Recap
17:21 (1)		First period
power play 02:08 (2)		Second period	(1) 17:40 power play
		Third period

16 April	Truro	3:2	Summerside	Credit Union Place	Recap
		First period
13:34 (1)		Second period
13:12 (2); 17:02 (3)		Third period	(1) 17:57 (2) 18:39

Truro Bearcats win series 4:3

=== Final: Edmundston Blizzard v. Truro Bearcats ===
The Truro Bearcats defeated the Edmundston Blizzard in 4 games to 1 to win the league championship.

20 April	Edmundston	4:0	Truro	Rath Eastlink Community Centre	Recap
		First period
16:12 (1); 17:20 (2); 19:32 (3)		Second period
00:16 (4)		Third period

21 April	Edmundston	3:4	Truro	Rath Eastlink Community Centre	Recap
16:33 (1)		First period
12:42 (2); 13:27 (3)		Second period	(1) 03:42 (2) 05:29 (3) 15:48 (4) 18:49
		Third period

24 April	Truro	5:2	Edmundston	Centre Jean Daigle	Recap
09:29 (1); 16:58 (2)		First period	(1) 03:33
		Second period	(2) 03:10
01:11 (3) (pp) 07:58 (4); 19:53 (5)		Third period

25 April	Truro	4:3	Edmundston	Centre Jean Daigle	Recap
01:50 (1); 17:43 (2)		First period	(1) 15:48
02:09 (3); 03:07 (4)		Second period	(2) 09:56 (3) 12:19 (pp)
		Third period

27 April	Edmundston	3:5	Truro	Rath Eastlink Community Centre	Recap
14:47 (1)		First period	(1) 04:25 (2) 05:43
04:43 (2); 05:38 (3)		Second period	(3) 06:37
		Third period	(4) 19:53 (5) 19:56

Truro Bearcats win series 4:1

== National championship ==
2026 National championship
Centennial Cup
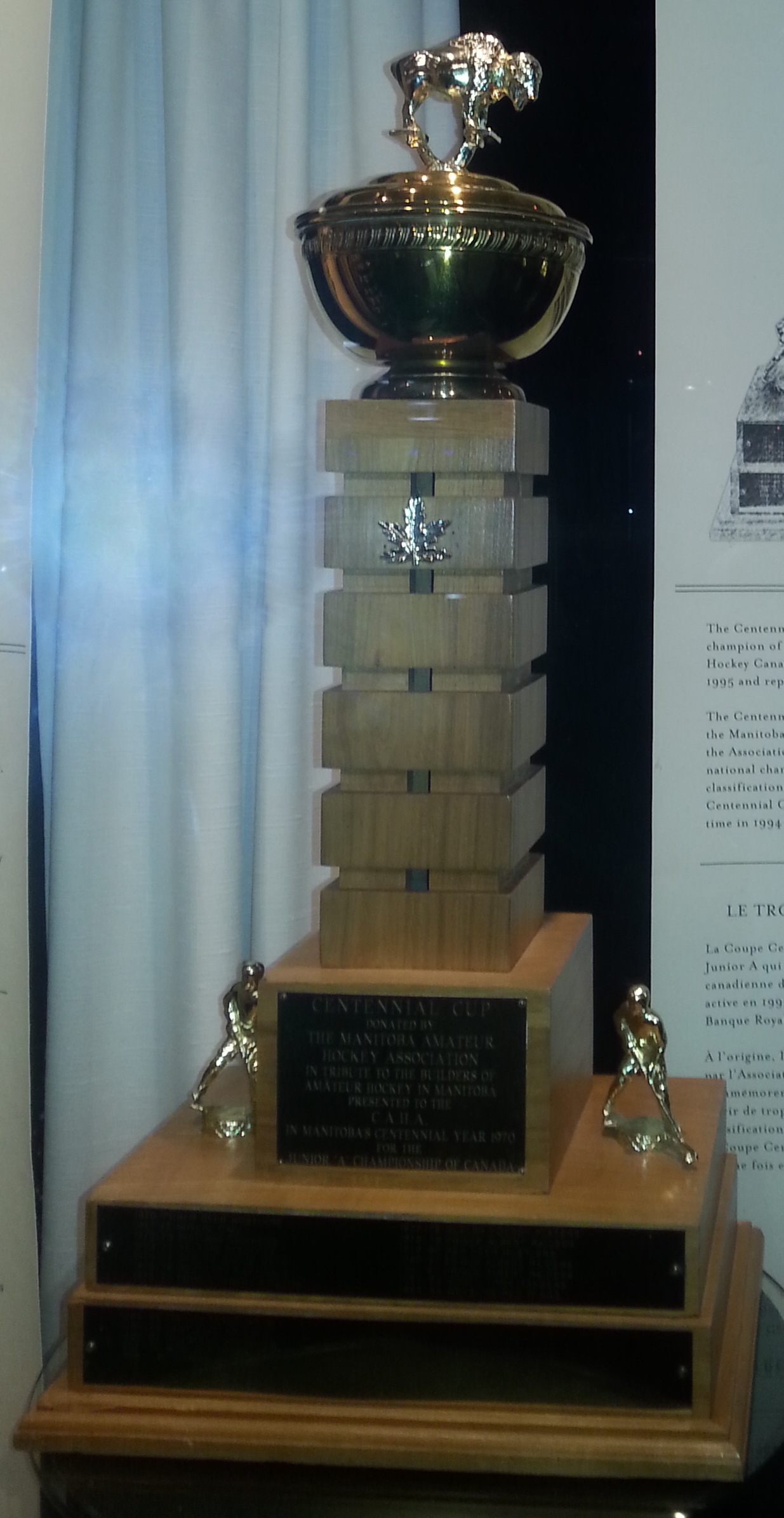

Tournament details
- City: Summerside, Prince Edward Island
- Venue: Consolidated Credit Union Place
- Dates: 7–17 May 2026
- Teams: 10
- Host team: Summerside Western Capitals

Final positions
- Champions: Niverville Nighthawks (1st title)
- Runners-up: Summerside Western Capitals
- Semifinalists: Collège Français de Longueuil; Toronto Patriots

Tournament statistics
- Games played: 25
- Goals scored: 178 (7.12 per game)

Awards
- MVP: Adam Vigfusson

Official website
- Hockey Canada

The MHL championship Truro Bearcats advanced to 2026 Centennial Cup national championship tournament. The Summerside Western Capitals, as the host team, also advanced despite having lost to the Bearcats in the MHL semifinal. The Western Capitals defeated the Bearcats in the national quarterfinal round. The Western Capitals subsequently defeated the Collège Français de Longueuil of the Quebec Junior Hockey League in the national semifinal. The Western Capitals lost to the Niverville Nighthawks of the Manitoba Junior Hockey League in the national championship final.

=== Preliminary round robin ===
Teams were randomly assigned to Group A or Group B. During the preliminary round robin phase, each team played each other team in their group once. Three points were awarded for a win in regulation time, two points for a win in overtime or shootout, one point for a loss in overtime or shootout, and no points were awarded for a loss in regulation time.

The Niverville Nighthawks and Collège Français de Longueuil advanced to the semifinals after placing first in their respective groups. The Summerside Western Capitals, Canmore Eagles, Toronto Patriots and Truro Bearcats advanced to the quarterfinals.

	Group A	NN	SW	CE	RN	TN
1	Niverville		5-4	6-4	7-6	7-2
2	Summerside	4-5		1-5	4-2	5-3
3	Canmore Eagles	4-6	5-1		3-2	3-2
4	Rockland Nationals	6-7	2-4	2-3		8-2
5	Thunder Bay	2-7	3-5	2-3	2-8	

	Group B	CF	TP	TB	FB	GC
1	Longueuil		7-4	1-2	1-0	3-1
2	Toronto Patriots	4-7		1-6	7-2	8-3
3	Truro Bearcats	2-1	6-1		1-3	1-4
4	Flin Flon Bombers	0-1	2-7	3-1		6-4
5	Greater Sudbury Cubs	1-3	3-8	4-1	4-6	

=== Playoffs ===
The Niverville Nighthawks and Collège Français de Longueuil each had a bye in the quarterfinal round. The Summerside Western Capitals defeated the Truro Bearcats, and the Toronto Patriots defeated the Canmore Eagles. In the semifinals, Summerside defeated Longueuil, and Niverville defeated Toronto.

Quarterfinals
Summerside Western Capitals	3
Truro Bearcats	1
Toronto Patriots	7
Canmore Eagles	3

Semifinals
Summerside Western Capitals	5
Collège Français de Longueuil	2
Niverville Nighthawks	4
Toronto Patriots	3

Finals
Summerside Western Capitals	1
Niverville Nighthawks	4

== Sources ==
- "Road to the RBC Cup: Summerside Western Capitals". hockeycanada.ca. 10 May 2013.
- "2026 Centennial Cup bid guidelines" (PDF). Hockey Canada.
- "2025 Centennial Cup Guide & Record Book" (PDF). hockeycanada.ca. Hockey Canada.
- "2025-26 MHL Exhibition schedule kicks off Friday". themhl.ca (Press release). Maritime Junior Hockey League. 28 August 2025.
- "Northshore Cup: A New Rivalry Begins". themhl.ca (Press release). Bathurst, NB: Maritime Junior Hockey League. 14 September 2025.
- DiRisio, Haeley (1 October 2025). "Summerside, P.E.I., to host 2026 Canadian Junior Hockey League Centennial Cup". CTV News Atlantic. Bell Media.
- "Former Steamers goaltender Rhyah Stewart wins NCAA Division I National Championship". themhl.ca (Press release). Maritime Junior Hockey League. 23 March 2026.
