= 2024–25 MHL season =

57th season of the Maritime Junior Hockey League

- League: Maritime Junior Hockey League
- Sport: Ice hockey
- Duration: Regular season September – March; Postseason; March – April
- Games: 312
- Teams: 12
- Total attendance: 310,426
- TV partner: Eastlink Community TV
- Streaming partner: FloSports

2024 MHL entry draft
- Top draft pick: Will Shearer
- Picked by: Campbellton Tigers

Metalfab Cup
- League champions: Edmundston Blizzard
- Runners-up: Pictou County Crushers

Seasons
- ← 2023–24 2025–26 →

The 2024–25 MHL season was the 57th season of the Maritime Junior Hockey League (MHL).

In November, the Edmundston Blizzard reached to the top of the CJHL Top 20 list, becoming the first MHL team to do so since 2011–12. The Blizzard went on to win the league championship Metalfab Cup and advanced to the national championship tournament in Calgary.

Goalie Rhyah Stewart of the West Kent Steamers became the second woman player in league history after 1995–96 Dartmouth Oland Exports goaltender Lisa Herritt. Stewart played 10 games for the Steamers with a .903 save percentage and 3.17 goals against average.

== Regular season ==
Teams each play a 52-game regular season schedule, including 8 matches against each team in their division, and two against each team in the other division.

North division
Team	GP	W	OTW	SOW	L	OTL	SOL	Pts
Edmundston Blizzard	52	44	5	2	6	1	1	90
West Kent Steamers	52	30	4	2	16	5	1	66
Campbellton Tigers	52	27	1	1	19	4	2	60
Miramichi Timberwolves	52	26	5	4	24	0	2	54
Grand Falls Rapids	52	16	0	0	27	2	7	41
Fredericton Red Wings	52	13	0	4	36	1	2	29

Source: "2024–25 MHL standings". hockeydb.com.

South division
Team	GP	W	OTW	SOW	L	OTL	SOL	Pts
Summerside Western Capitals	52	38	2	1	10	2	2	80
Amherst Ramblers	52	35	3	1	15	2	0	72
Truro Bearcats	52	28	1	1	22	1	1	58
Pictou County Crushers	52	25	0	2	21	5	1	56
Yarmouth Mariners	52	21	3	2	30	0	1	43
Valley Wildcats	52	9	0	1	41	1	1	20

Source: "2024–25 MHL standings". hockeydb.com.

== Post-season ==
2025 League championship
Metalfab Cup

Tournament details
- Dates: 14 March – 24 April
- Teams: 8

Final positions
- Champions: Edmundston Blizzard
- Runners-up: Pictou County Crushers
- Semifinalists: Campbellton Tigers; Truro Bearcats

Tournament statistics
- Games played: 34
- Goals scored: 245 (7.21 per game)
- Attendance: 56,702 (1,668 per game)

Awards
- Playoff MVP: Carl-Anthony Massé

Official website
- 2025 MHL playoffs

The first seed Edmundston Blizzard swept the final round against the seventh seed Pictou County Crushers in four games to win the league championship Metalfab Cup and advanced to the national championship tournament in Calgary.

Quarterfinals
Edmundston Blizzard	4
Miramichi Timberwolves	1
West Kent Steamers	2
Campbellton Tigers	4
Amherst Ramblers	2
Truro Bearcats	4
Summerside	1
Pictou County Crushers	4

Semifinals
Edmundston Blizzard	4
Campbellton Tigers	0
Truro Bearcats	0
Pictou County Crushers	4

Finals
Edmundston Blizzard	4
Pictou County Crushers	0

Source: "2024–25 MHL playoff results". hockeydb.com.

=== Quarterfinal: Edmundston Blizzard vs Miramichi Timberwolves ===
The first-place Edmundston Blizzard defeated the eighth-place Miramichi Timberwolves in four games to one. Miramichi's double-overtime victory in game two was Edmunston's only loss of the playoffs.

14 March	Miramichi Timberwolves	0:5	Edmundston Blizzard	Centre Jean Daigle	Recap
		First period	(1) 11:28 (2) 12:41
		Second period	(3) 06:12 (4) 14:27 power play
		Third period	(5) 18:09

16 March	Edmundston Blizzard	6:7	2OT	Miramichi Timberwolves	Miramichi Civic Centre	Recap
02:54 (1)		First period		(1) 02:19 (2) 12:34
		Second period		(3) 05:18 (4) 12:34 (5) 12:42
03:00 (2); 04:46 (3); 05:08 (4); 11:16 (5); 13:32 (6)		Third period		(6) 17:11
		Second overtime period		(7) 00:34

20 March	Miramichi Timberwolves	3:7	Edmundston Blizzard	Centre Jean Daigle	Recap
power play 08:53 (1)		First period	(1) 06:53 (2) 17:25
		Second period	(3) 04:26 (4) 06:01 (5) 19:58
03:06 (2) power play 14:24 (3)		Third period	(6) 14:45 (7) 19:58 power play

22 March	Edmundston Blizzard	3:2	Miramichi Timberwolves	Miramichi Civic Centre	Recap

24 March	Miramichi Timberwolves	2:3	Edmundston Blizzard	Centre Jean Daigle	Recap
		First period	(1) 08:21
17:02 (1)		Second period	(2) 00:41
15:05 (2)		Third period	(3) 00:25

Edmundston Blizzard win 4:1

=== Quarterfinal: West Kent Steamers vs Campbellton Tigers ===
The fifth-place Campbellton Tigers defeated the fourth-place West Kent Steamers in four games to two after winning game six in double-overtime.

16 March	Campbellton Tigers	4:2	West Kent Steamers	J.K. Irving Centre	Recap

19 March	West Kent Steamers	3:4	Campbellton Tigers	Campbellton Memorial Civic Centre	Recap
19:41 (1)		First period	(1) 05:11
power play 13:20 (2); 14:18 (3)		Second period	(2) 03:07 (3) 09:20 power play (4) 10:02
		Third period

21 March	Campbellton Tigers	3:7	West Kent Steamers	J.K. Irving Centre	Recap

23 March	West Kent Steamers	5:2	Campbellton Tigers	Campbellton Memorial Civic Centre	Recap
power play 14:17 (1)		First period	(1) 05:24 (2) 06:37
04:38 (2) power play 19:42 (3)		Second period
05:52 (4); 12:54 (5)		Third period

26 March	Campbellton Tigers	5:1	West Kent Steamers	J.K. Irving Centre	Recap

28 March	West Kent Steamers	2:3	2OT	Campbellton Tigers	Campbellton Memorial Civic Centre	Recap

Campbellton Tigers win 4:2

=== Quarterfinal: Amherst Ramblers vs Truro Bearcats ===
The sixth-place Truro Bearcats defeated the third-place Amherst Ramblers in four games to two.

15 March	Truro Bearcats	1:11	Amherst Ramblers	Amherst Stadium	Recap
		First period	(1) 07:13 (2) 15:27
		Second period	(3) 08:20 (4) 10:09 (5) 15:53 (6) 16:42
power play 19:18 (1)		Third period	(7) 03:37 (8) 05:24 power play (9) 15:02 (10) 15:48 (11) 16:36

18 March	Amherst Ramblers	5:8	Truro Bearcats	Rath Eastlink Community Centre	Recap
04:47 (1); 12:43 (2)		First period	(1) 04:11 (2) 16:53 short handed
05:52 (3); 07:30 (4)		Second period	(3) 16:37 power play (4) 18:44 power play
power play 09:35 (5)		Third period	(5) 03:18 (6) 06:39 (7) 08:09 (8) 17:57 empty net

21 March	Truro Bearcats	3:4	2OT	Amherst Ramblers	Amherst Stadium	Recap
		First period		(1) 13:25
02:48 (1)		Second period		(2) 00:20 (3) 11:36 short handed
power play 16:36 (2); 17:55 (3)		Third period
		Second overtime period		(4) 07:49

22 March	Amherst Ramblers	3:4	Truro Bearcats	Rath Eastlink Community Centre	Recap

24 March	Truro Bearcats	6:5	2OT	Amherst Ramblers	Amherst Stadium	Recap
06:14 (1); 13:17 (2)		First period		(1) 07:28 short handed
		Second period		(2) 04:00 (3) 07:26 power play (4) 11:23 (5) 15:37 short handed
short handed 07:15 (3); 09:39 (4); 18:17 (5)		Third period
03:03 (6)		Second overtime period

27 March	Amherst Ramblers	0:2	Truro Bearcats	Rath Eastlink Community Centre	Recap

Truro Bearcats win 4:2

=== Quarterfinal: Summerside Western Capitals vs Pictou County Crushers ===
The seventh-place Pictou County Crushers defeated the second-place Summerside Western Capitals in four games to one.

15 March	Pictou County Crushers	4:1	Summerside Western Capitals	Credit Union Place	Recap

16 March	Summerside Western Capitals	2:3	Pictou County Crushers	Pictou County Wellness Centre	Recap

18 March	Pictou County Crushers	4:5	Summerside Western Capitals	Credit Union Place	Recap

20 March	Summerside Western Capitals	5:6	OT	Pictou County Crushers	Pictou County Wellness Centre	Recap
12:37 (1)		First period		(1) 10:16 power play
		Second period		(2) 04:12 power play (3) 06:35 (4) 14:37 power play
power play 06:37 (2) power play 17:18 (3); 18:50 (4); 19:04 (5)		Third period		(5) 02:53
		First overtime period		(6) 06:48

22 March	Pictou County Crushers	5:4	OT	Summerside Western Capitals	Credit Union Place	Recap
16:11 (1); 18:13 (2)		First period		(1) 08:07
08:45 (3)		Second period		(2) 18:54 power play
05:12 (4)		Third period		(3) 10:13 (4) 10:45
08:32 (5)		First overtime period

Pictou County Crushers win 4:1

=== Semifinal: Edmundston Blizzard vs Campbellton Tigers ===
The Edmundston Blizzard swept the Campbellton Tigers in four games to advance to the final.

1 April	Campbellton Tigers	3:4	Edmundston Blizzard	Centre Jean Daigle	Recap
		First period	(1) 02:00 power play (2) 14:07 power play
power play 06:17 (1); 06:48 (2) power play 17:51 (3)		Second period	(3) 03:01 (4) 08:54
		Third period

4 April	Edmundston Blizzard	6:3	Campbellton Tigers	Campbellton Memorial Civic Centre	Recap
01:15 (1); 18:50 (2)		First period	(1) 18:31
short handed 15:02 (3)		Second period	(2) 02:46
00:54 (4); 14:05 (5) power play 15:55 (6)		Third period	(3) 02:48

5 April	Campbellton Tigers	1:4	Edmundston Blizzard	Centre Jean Daigle	Recap
		First period	(1) 19:53 power play
09:10 (1)		Second period	(2) 05:32 (3) 07:07
		Third period	(4) 18:56 empty net

8 April	Edmundston Blizzard	6:3	Campbellton Tigers	Campbellton Memorial Civic Centre	Recap
power play 08:21 (1)		First period	(1) 02:18 (2) 15:43 power play (3) 18:29
10:09 (2); 15:18 (3); 16:47 (4)		Second period
06:39 (5); 07:25 (6)		Third period

Edmundston Blizzard win 4:0

=== Semifinal: Truro Bearcats vs Pictou County Crushers ===
The Pictou County Crushers swept the Truro Bearcats in four games to win the Nova Scotia Junior A championship and advance to the MHL championship final against the Edmundston Blizzard.

3 April	Pictou County Crushers	1:0	Truro Bearcats	Rath Eastlink Community Centre	Recap

5 April	Truro Bearcats	2:3	Pictou County Crushers	Pictou County Wellness Centre	Recap

7 April	Pictou County Crushers	4:0	Truro Bearcats	Rath Eastlink Community Centre	Recap

9 April	Truro Bearcats	1:2	Pictou County Crushers	Pictou County Wellness Centre	Recap

Pictou County Crushers win 4:0

=== Final: Edmundston Blizzard vs Pictou County Crushers ===
The Edmundston Blizzard swept the Pictou County Crushers in four games to win the league championship Metalfab Cup and advance to the national championship 2025 Centennial Cup tournament in Calgary.

18 April	Pictou County Crushers	3:7	Edmundston Blizzard	Centre Jean-Daigle	Recap
18:28 (1)		First period	(1) 10:09 (2) 19:41
power play 18:48 (2)		Second period	(3) 00:42 (4) 8:27 (5) 12:03 (6) 15:03 power play
power play 14:08 (3)		Third period	(7) 09:12

19 April	Pictou County Crushers	3:6	Edmundston Blizzard	Centre Jean-Daigle	Recap
		First period	(1) 00:25 (2) 16:57 power play (3) 18:07
power play 05:08 (1) power play 09:05 (2); 09:33 (3)		Second period	(4) 05:48 power play
		Third period	(5) 05:47 (6) 07:37

23 Apr	Edmundston Blizzard	7:2	Pictou County Crushers	Pictou County Wellness Centre	Recap
09:25 (1) power play 14:31 (2); 17:09 (3)		First period	(1) 13:26
10:32 (4) power play 19:52 (5)		Second period	(2) 16:21
power play 11:25 (6) power play 13:31 (7)		Third period

24 Apr	Edmundston Blizzard	3:1	Pictou County Crushers	Pictou County Wellness Centre	Recap
04:55 (1); 18:40 (2)		First period
13:56 (3)		Second period
		Third period	(1) 18:59

Edmundston Blizzard win 4:0

== National championship ==
2025 National championship
Centennial Cup
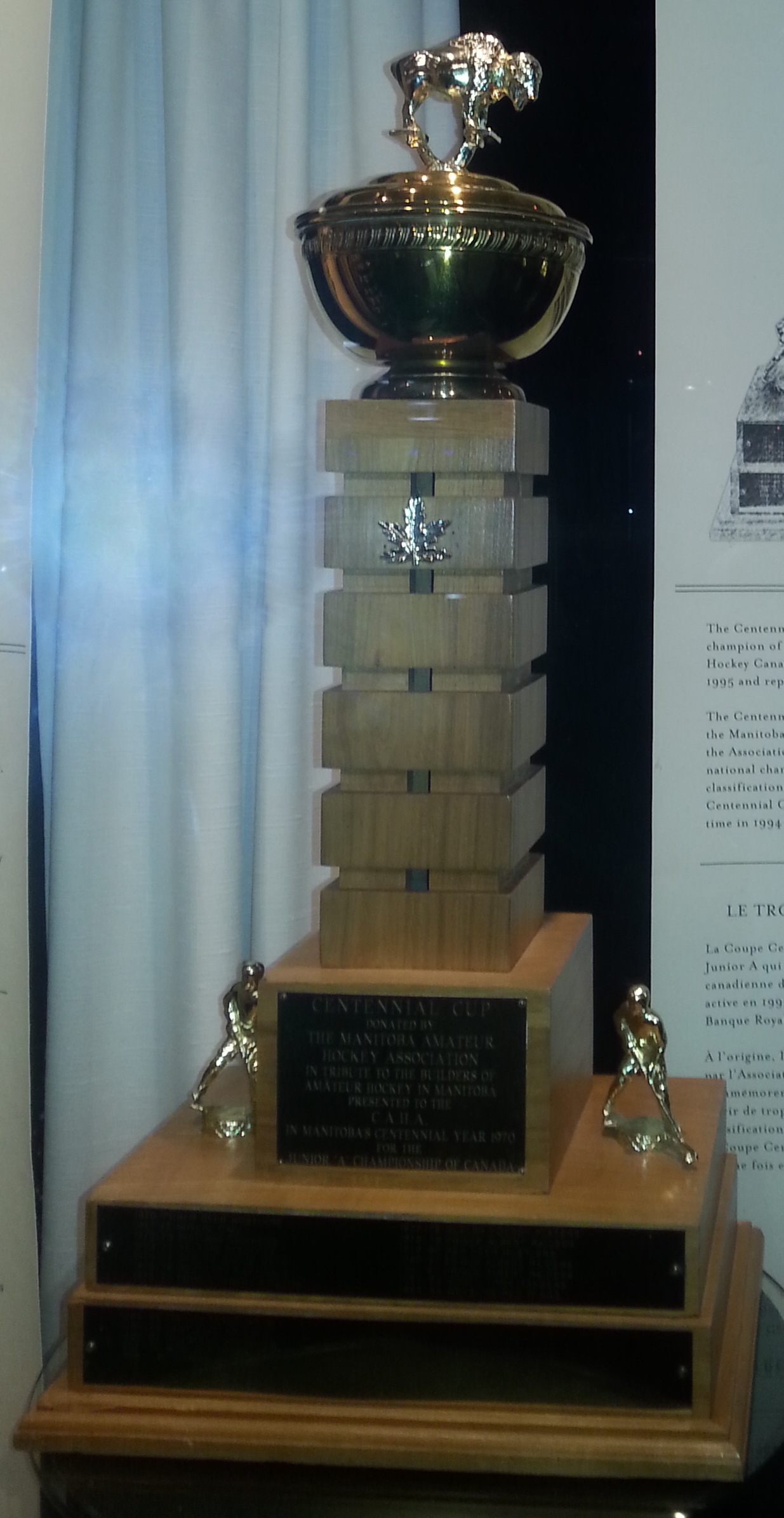

Tournament details
- City: Calgary, AB
- Venue: Max Bell Centre
- Dates: 8–18 May 2025
- Teams: 10
- Host team: Calgary Canucks

Official website
- Hockey Canada

The 54th annual Junior A national championship tournament took place at the Max Bell Centre in Calgary, hosted by the Calgary Canucks of the Alberta Junior Hockey League (AJHL). Representing the MHL, the Metalfab Cup championship Edmundston Blizzard were eliminated from competition after losing two out of four matches in the preliminary round.
