= Nicolas Deschamps (ice hockey) =

Canadian ice hockey forward (born 1990)

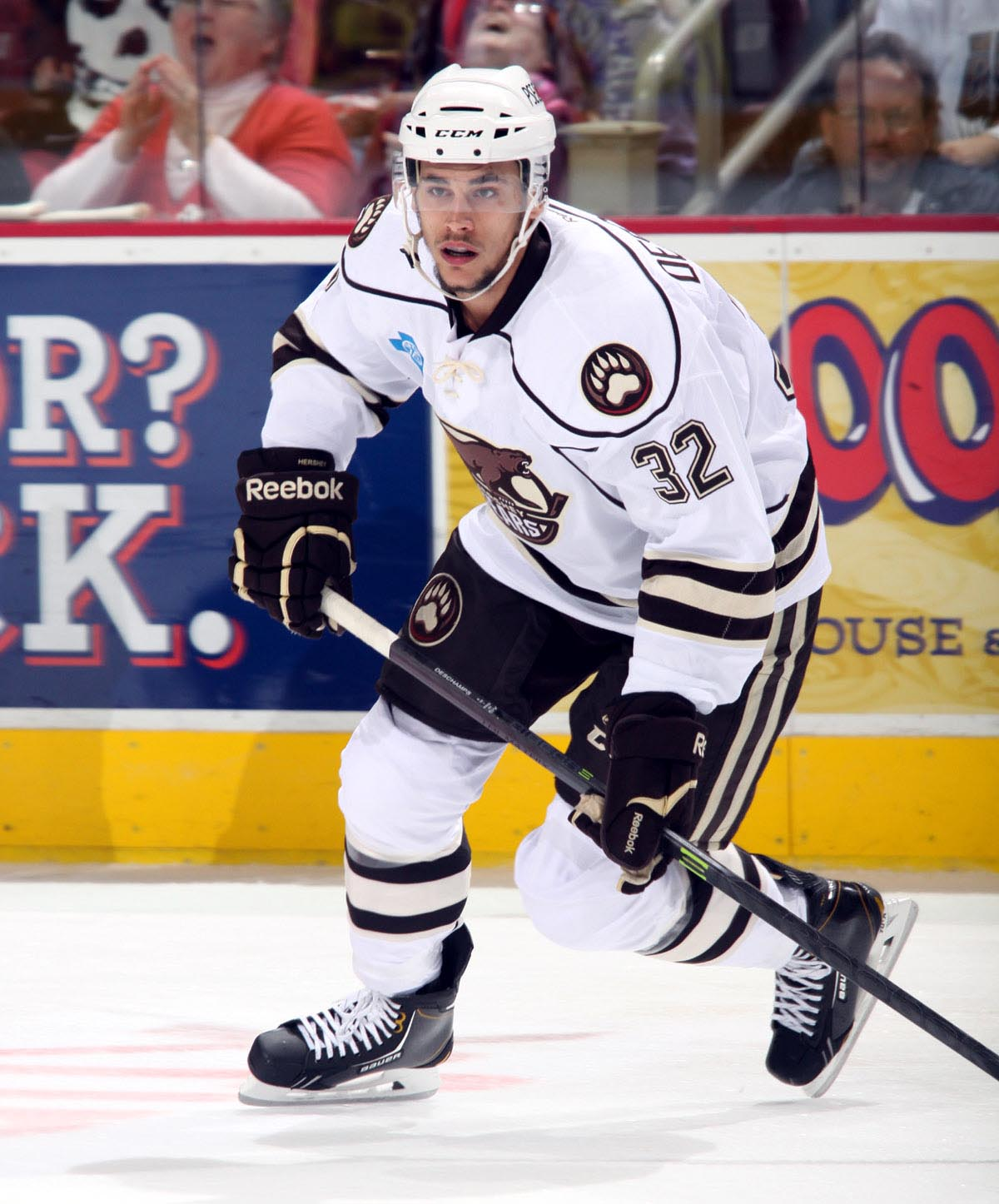
- Deschamps with the Hershey Bears in 2013
- Born: January 6, 1990 (age 36) LaSalle, Quebec, Canada
- Height: 6 ft 2 in (188 cm)
- Weight: 207 lb (94 kg; 14 st 11 lb)
- Position: Left wing
- Shoots: Left
- Magnus team Former teams: Brûleurs de Loups; Washington Capitals; Oulun Kärpät; Straubing Tigers; Vienna Capitals; IK Oskarshamn; Dragons de Rouen
- NHL draft: 35th overall, 2008; Anaheim Ducks
- Playing career: 2009–present

Nicolas Deschamps (born January 6, 1990) is a Canadian professional ice hockey forward. He is currently playing for Brûleurs de Loups of the Ligue Magnus. Deschamps made his professional debut in the AHL in 2009 when he appeared in two games for the Iowa Chops. He made his National Hockey League debut in the 2013–14 season with the Washington Capitals.

== Playing career ==
Deschamps was a second round pick, 35th overall, of the Anaheim Ducks at the 2008 NHL entry draft.

He began his junior career in 2007–08, scoring 24 goals and 67 points in 63 games for the Chicoutimi Saguenéens. He won the Michel Bergeron Trophy as the QMJHL's offensive rookie of the year, and was named to both the QMJHL and CHL All-Rookie Teams.

After recording 65 points in 65 games for Chicoutimi in 2008–09, he was assigned to the Chops, appearing in two games before their season also ended. He began the 2009–10 QMJHL season with Chicoutimi, appearing in 31 games before he was traded to the Wildcats.

On January 3, 2012, Deschamps was traded from the Anaheim Ducks to the Toronto Maple Leafs in exchange for left winger Luca Caputi. He was directly assigned to AHL affiliate, the Toronto Marlies, and re-established his scoring presence from his rookie season to record 30 points in 40 games, to help the Marlies reach the Calder Cup finals.

During the following 2012–13 season, Deschamps was again subject to trade, when he was dealt by the Maple Leafs to the Washington Capitals in exchange for Kevin Marshall on March 14, 2013.

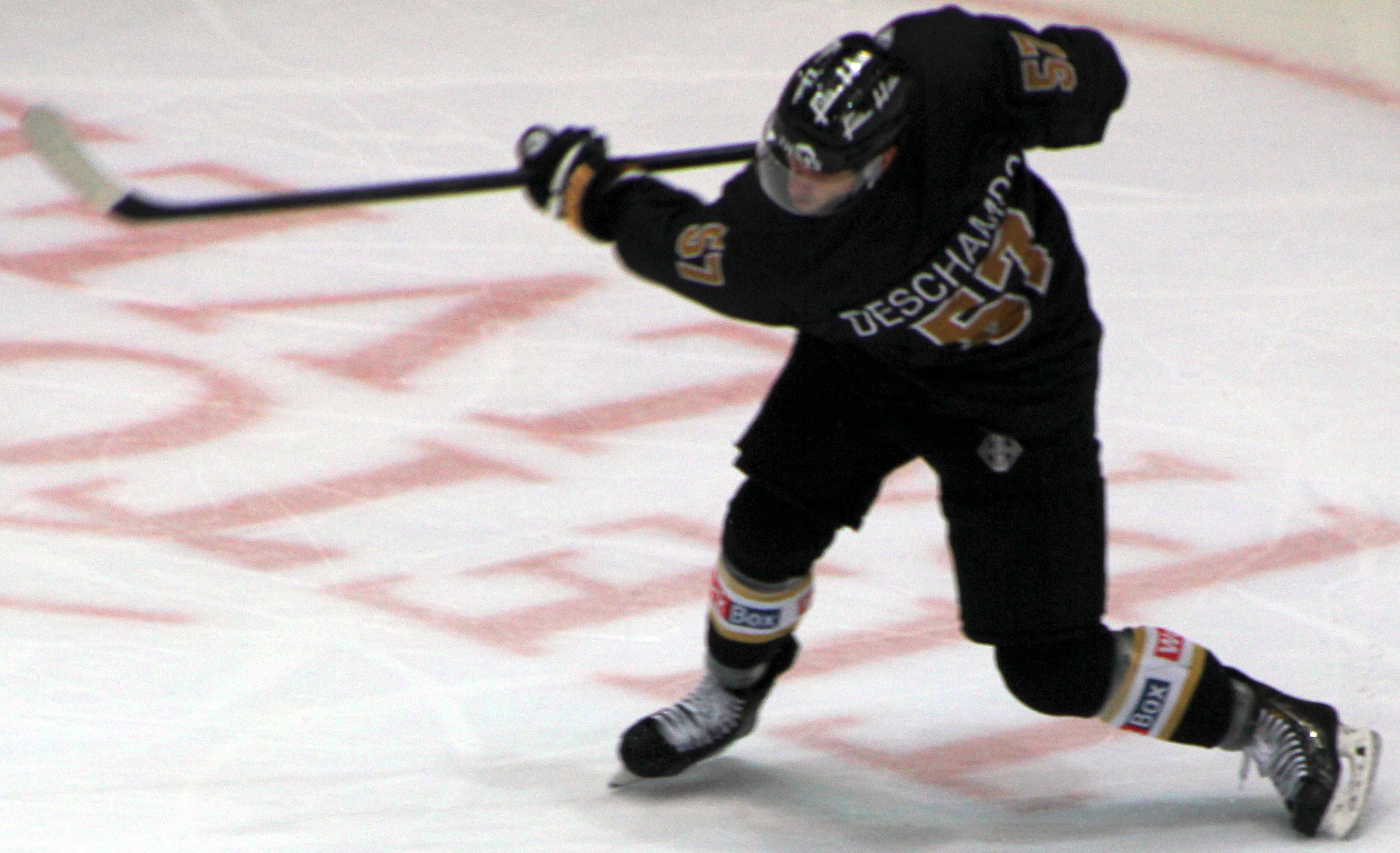
Deschamps with Oulun Kärpät in 2014

On July 23, 2014, Deschamps signed abroad in Finland, agreeing to a one-year deal with Liiga club, Oulun Kärpät. In the 2014–15 season, Deschamps struggled initially with Kärpät, registering just 1 goal in 8 games before he was released from his contract. On October 30, 2014, Dechamps signed a short-term contract with German Deutsche Eishockey Liga club, the Straubing Tigers. After 8 points in 11 games, Deschamps moved to the neighbouring Austrian Hockey League for his third brief stint with the Vienna Capitals before opting to return to North America. On February 5, 2015, Deschamps was claimed off AHL waivers by the Syracuse Crunch from the Lehigh Valley Phantoms. After 12 games with the Crunch, Deschamps was reassigned to the ECHL with the Florida Everblades to finish the year.

Deschamps played the 2015–16, and 2016–17 seasons with IK Oskarshamn, and the 2017–18 season with Dragons de Rouen.

== Career statistics ==
=== Regular season and playoffs ===
			Regular season					Playoffs
Season	Team	League	GP	G	A	Pts	PIM	GP	G	A	Pts	PIM
2007–08	Chicoutimi Saguenéens	QMJHL	70	24	43	67	63	6	2	3	5	6
2008–09	Chicoutimi Saguenéens	QMJHL	65	24	41	65	40	4	3	1	4	12
2008–09	Iowa Chops	AHL	2	0	1	1	0	—	—	—	—	—
2009–10	Chicoutimi Saguenéens	QMJHL	31	18	26	44	20	—	—	—	—	—
2009–10	Moncton Wildcats	QMJHL	33	21	32	52	20	15	5	9	14	10
2010–11	Syracuse Crunch	AHL	80	15	31	46	26	—	—	—	—	—
2011–12	Syracuse Crunch	AHL	31	5	2	7	10	—	—	—	—	—
2011–12	Toronto Marlies	AHL	40	7	23	30	13	17	3	9	12	8
2012–13	Toronto Marlies	AHL	50	7	9	16	26	—	—	—	—	—
2012–13	Hershey Bears	AHL	16	3	4	7	2	5	1	2	3	2
2013–14	Hershey Bears	AHL	65	15	25	40	24	—	—	—	—	—
2013–14	Washington Capitals	NHL	3	0	0	0	0	—	—	—	—	—
2014–15	Oulun Kärpät	Liiga	8	1	0	1	20	—	—	—	—	—
2014–15	Straubing Tigers	DEL	11	2	6	8	6	—	—	—	—	—
2014–15	Vienna Capitals	EBEL	10	0	2	2	0	—	—	—	—	—
2014–15	Syracuse Crunch	AHL	12	0	1	1	2	—	—	—	—	—
2014–15	Florida Everblades	ECHL	13	3	7	10	2	12	4	9	13	2
2015–16	IK Oskarshamn	Allsv	52	9	24	33	14	5	2	0	2	4
2016–17	IK Oskarshamn	Allsv	42	16	20	36	24	—	—	—	—	—
2017–18	Dragons de Rouen	FRA	44	20	28	48	24	15	10	10	20	4
2018–19	Dragons de Rouen	FRA	36	11	22	33	16	16	2	11	13	2
2019–20	Dragons de Rouen	FRA	40	12	33	45	26	4	2	4	6	2
2020–21	Dragons de Rouen	FRA	22	10	19	29	8	—	—	—	—	—
NHL totals			3	0	0	0	0	—	—	—	—	—

=== International ===
Year	Team	Event	Result	GP	G	A	Pts	PIM
2008	Canada	WJC18	1st place, gold medalist(s)	7	3	0	3	2
Junior totals				7	3	0	3	2
