= Sébastien Piché =

Canadian ice hockey player

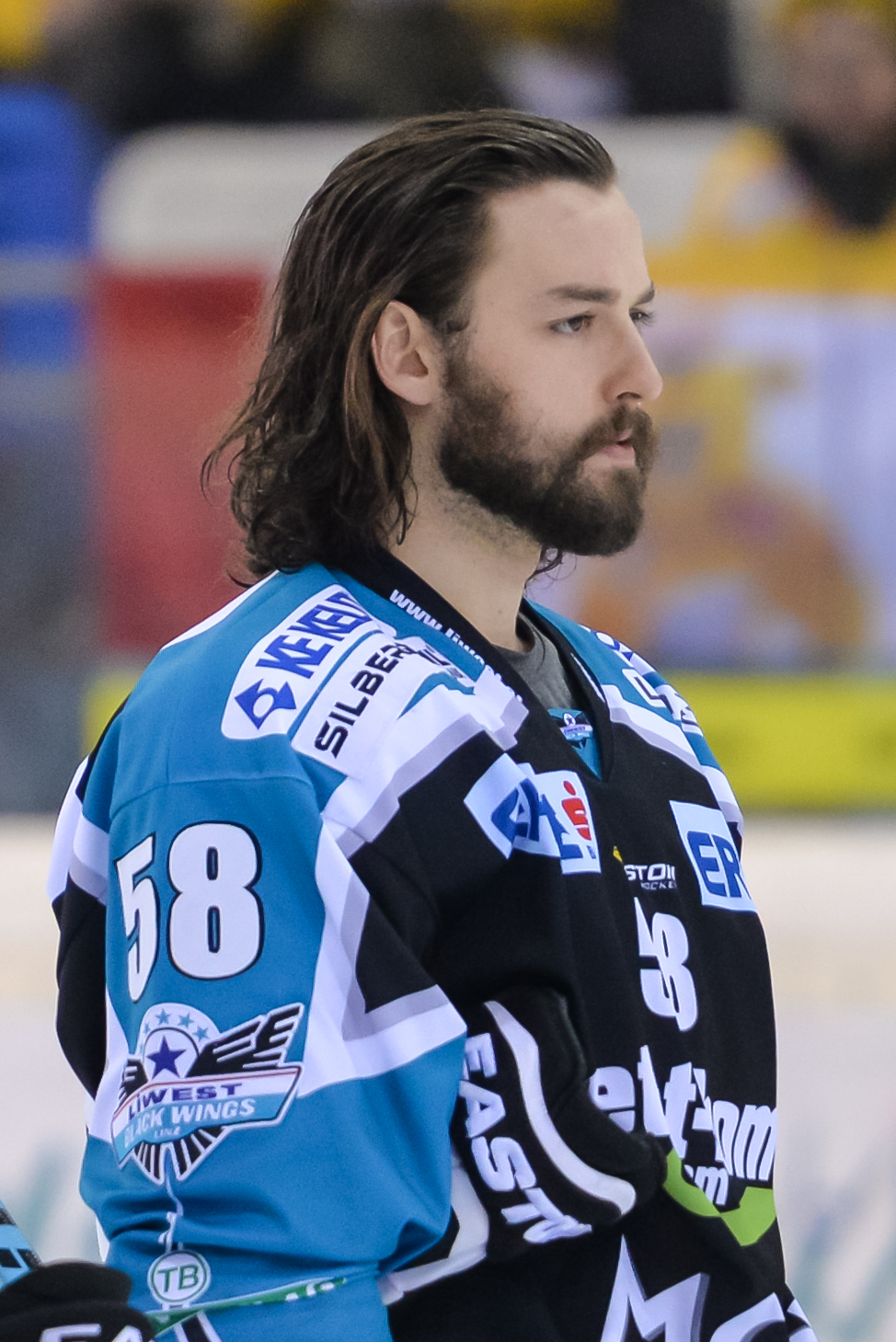
- Born: February 4, 1988 (age 38) La Sarre, Quebec, Canada
- Height: 6 ft 0 in (183 cm)
- Weight: 202 lb (92 kg; 14 st 6 lb)
- Position: Defence
- Shoots: Left
- Erste Liga team Former teams: CSM Corona Brasov; Grand Rapids Griffins; HC Bolzano; EHC Black Wings Linz; HK Olimpija; Sheffield Steelers
- NHL draft: Undrafted
- Playing career: 2009–present

Sébastien Piché (born February 4, 1988) is a Canadian professional ice hockey player who is currently playing for CSM Corona Brasov in the Erste Liga. Piché most recently iced with Sheffield Steelers, and was previously with HK Olimpija and EHC Black Wings Linz of the International Central European IceHL.

== Playing career ==
Piché began his major junior career playing five seasons in the QMJHL before on March 30, 2009, he was signed as a free agent by the Detroit Red Wings.

On February 21, 2012, he was traded along with Detroit's 2012 first round pick to the Tampa Bay Lightning for defenceman Kyle Quincey. On the next day, he was assigned by the Lightning to the Florida Everblades of the ECHL.

As a free agent, Piché was signed to a one-year AHL contract with the Connecticut Whale on September 26, 2012. He was reassigned to ECHL affiliate, the Greenville Road Warriors for the duration of the 2012–13 season.

On August 7, 2013, Piche signed his first European contract, agreeing to a one-year deal as a free agent with HC Bolzano for their first season in the Austrian Hockey League. Piché immediately paid dividends for Bolzano in 2013–14 season, scoring an elite 43 points in just 50 games from the blueline to lead the Foxes. In the EBEL playoffs, Piché contributed with 11 points in 13 games to help Bolzano become the first non-Austrian club, to claim the EBEL Championship.

On May 1, 2014, Piché opted to continue in the EBEL, however left Bolzano to sign with Austrian club EHC Black Wings Linz.

He has since had two spells with EHC Black Wings Linz, and stints in the Czech Republic with Mountfield HK, HC Litvínov, Pirati Chomutov and HC Dynamo Pardubice, with Bratislava Capitals in Slovakia and HK Olimpija in Slovenia.

In August 2022, Piché agreed terms to join UK Elite Ice Hockey League (EIHL) side Sheffield Steelers for the 2022–23 season.

In 2023, Piché moved to Romania to join CSM Corona Brasov in the Erste Liga.

== Career statistics ==
			Regular season					Playoffs
Season	Team	League	GP	G	A	Pts	PIM	GP	G	A	Pts	PIM
2004–05	Rouyn-Noranda Huskies	QMJHL	2	0	0	0	2	—	—	—	—	—
2004–05	Lewiston MAINEiacs	QMJHL	24	0	3	3	33	8	0	1	1	18
2005–06	Lewiston MAINEiacs	QMJHL	65	1	14	15	83	6	0	1	1	12
2006–07	Lewiston MAINEiacs	QMJHL	62	4	23	27	122	10	3	3	6	8
2007–08	Shawinigan Cataractes	QMJHL	18	1	11	12	21	—	—	—	—	—
2007–08	Rouyn-Noranda Huskies	QMJHL	32	1	27	28	44	17	4	19	23	39
2008–09	Rimouski Oceanic	QMJHL	62	23	49	72	69	12	2	4	6	14
2009–10	Grand Rapids Griffins	AHL	9	0	0	0	4	—	—	—	—	—
2009–10	Toledo Walleye	ECHL	46	5	23	28	67	4	0	2	2	4
2010–11	Grand Rapids Griffins	AHL	11	0	2	2	13	—	—	—	—	—
2010–11	Toledo Walleye	ECHL	48	12	21	33	52	—	—	—	—	—
2011–12	Grand Rapids Griffins	AHL	22	0	3	3	18	—	—	—	—	—
2011–12	Florida Everblades	ECHL	16	3	7	10	41	18	2	9	11	51
2012–13	Greenville Road Warriors	ECHL	27	1	10	11	30	5	1	0	1	2
2013–14	HC Bolzano	EBEL	50	10	33	43	59	13	3	8	11	30
2014–15	EHC Black Wings Linz	EBEL	50	13	26	39	49	12	1	11	12	13
2015–16	EHC Black Wings Linz	EBEL	52	16	32	48	62	12	1	8	9	22
2016–17	EHC Black Wings Linz	EBEL	46	11	34	45	38	2	0	0	0	2
2017–18	EHC Black Wings Linz	EBEL	46	6	26	32	20	12	3	4	7	8
2018–19	Mountfield HK	CZE	17	1	4	5	14	—	—	—	—	—
2018–19	HC Litvinov	CZE	8	1	4	5	22	—	—	—	—	—
2019–20	HC Dynamo Pardubice	CZE	9	1	2	3	6	—	—	—	—	—
2019–20	Pirati Chomutov	CZE-2	15	4	5	9	12	—	—	—	—	—
2019–20	Bratislava Capitals	SVK-2	6	0	0	0	24	—	—	—	—	—
2020–21	EHC Black Wings Linz	IceHL	47	1	12	13	50	—	—	—	—	—
2021–22	HK Olimpija	IceHL	45	6	20	26	35	7	1	6	7	0
2021–22	HK Olimpija	SVN	1	0	0	0	0	4	2	3	5	2
2022–23	Sheffield Steelers	EIHL	33	6	11	17	29	—	—	—	—	—
AHL totals			42	0	5	5	35	—	—	—	—	—

== Awards and honours ==
Award	Year
QMJHL Second All-Star Team	2008–09
