= Chaleur Lightning =

Ice hockey team in New Brunswick, Canada

- City: Bathurst, New Brunswick
- League: MHL
- Division: North
- Founded: 2025
- Home arena: K.C. Irving Regional Centre
- Colours
- Owner: Roger Shannon
- General manager: George MacIntyre
- Head coach: Francis Rochon
- Website: chaleurlightning.ca

Franchise history
- 2016–2019: St. Stephen Aces
- 2019–2025: Fredericton Red Wings
- Since 2025: Chaleur Lightning

The Chaleur Lightning are a Junior ice hockey franchise in the Maritime Junior Hockey League (MHL) based in Bathurst, New Brunswick. The team debuted in the 2025–26 MHL season and plays its home games at the 3,524-seat K.C. Irving Regional Centre in Bathurst. The franchise was previously based in Fredericton and known as the Fredericton Red Wings from 2019–2025. The Lightning team logo comprises a lightning bolt and waves, representative of the Bay of Chaleur.

The Lightning finished the 2025–26 regular season in 4th place in their division, 8th place overall, with a .625 win percentage. They eliminated the first-place Grand Falls Rapids in the first round of the playoffs in 4 games to 1.

Statistics
Season	GP	W	L	OTL	SOL	Pts	Regular season	Postseason
2025–26	52	31	18	2	1	65	4th in division 8th overall	Won quarterfinal against Grand Falls (4:1); Lost semifinal against Edmundston (4:2)

Source: "Chaleur Lightning statistics and history". hockeydb.com.
