= Francis Paré =

Canadian ice hockey player and coach (born 1987)

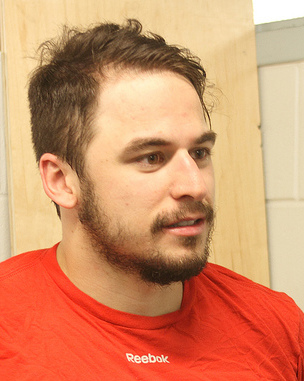
- Paré in 2013
- Born: June 30, 1987 (age 39) LeMoyne, Quebec, Canada
- Height: 5 ft 10 in (178 cm)
- Weight: 185 lb (84 kg; 13 st 3 lb)
- Position: Right wing
- Shoots: Right
- LNAH team Former teams: National de Québec: Grand Rapids Griffins; HC TPS; Metallurg Magnitogorsk; Traktor Chelyabinsk; HC Slovan Bratislava; Medveščak Zagreb; Genève-Servette HC; Avtomobilist Yekaterinburg; Dinamo Minsk; Avangard Omsk; Lausanne HC; EHC Visp; Saint-Georges Cool FM 103.5
- Current coach: Italy; Blizzard du Séminaire Saint-François (QM18AAA)
- National team: Belarus
- NHL draft: Undrafted
- Playing career: 2008–present
- Coaching career: 2023–present

Francis Paré (born June 30, 1987) is a Belarusian Canadian professional ice hockey forward and coach. He has played with the National de Québec in the semi-professional Ligue Nord-Américaine de Hockey (LNAH) since 2024.

Paré has served as development coach to the Blizzard du Séminaire Saint-François of the Ligue de développement du hockey M18 AAA du Québec (QM18AAA) since 2023, and as an assistant coach to the Italian women's national ice hockey team since 2024.

== Playing career ==
Undrafted, Paré previously played with the Grand Rapids Griffins in the American Hockey League (AHL). On July 27, 2011, Pare signed a two-year, two-way contract extension with the Griffins NHL affiliate, the Detroit Red Wings.

On July 8, 2013, after helping the Griffins capture the Calder Cup, Paré was signed to a two-year contract abroad in Finland with TPS of the SM-liiga. In the following years, Paré played for different teams in the Kontinental Hockey League (KHL), including Metallurg Magnitogorsk, Traktor Chelyabinsk and HC Slovan Bratislava. In 2014, he won the Gagarin Cup with Magnitogorsk. After returning to TPS for a second stint during the 2015–16 season, he again signed a deal with a KHL side, agreeing terms with Medvescak Zagreb in June 2016.

On January 23, 2017, Paré left the KHL and signed a contract with Swiss club, Geneve-Servette HC of the National League A (NLA) for the remainder of the season. He appeared in 8 regular season games, with 11 points.

As a free agent in the off-season, Paré opted to return to the KHL, agreeing to an initial one-year contract for the 2017–18 season with Avtomobilist Yekaterinburg on March 24, 2017.

Paré had two seasons in Yekaterinburg before leaving as a free agent to sign a one-year contract with fellow KHL club, HC Dinamo Minsk, on June 22, 2019.

Paré left Minsk after two seasons, securing a one-year contract with reigning champions, Avangard Omsk, on May 10, 2021. in the 2021–22 season, he collected 2 goals and 4 points through 16 appearances with Avangard before he was released from his contract on November 5, 2021. He continued his career abroad by signing an initial try-out contract and later securing a one-year deal with Swiss club, Lausanne HC of the NL, on December 10, 2021.

== International play ==
On January 26, 2021, the Belarus Ice Hockey Federation announced that Paré had accepted an offer to play for the Belarus men's national ice hockey team in the 2021 IIHF World Championship. He registered 1 assist through 6 games in a 15th-place finish with Belarus.

== Career statistics ==
=== Regular season and playoffs ===
			Regular season					Playoffs
Season	Team	League	GP	G	A	Pts	PIM	GP	G	A	Pts	PIM
2002–03	Collège Charles–Lemoyne	QMAAA	42	8	13	21	12	—	—	—	—	—
2003–04	Collège Charles–Lemoyne	QMAAA	35	52	30	82	38	15	15	9	24	50
2003–04	Shawinigan Cataractes	QMJHL	5	2	0	2	2	—	—	—	—	—
2004–05	Shawinigan Cataractes	QMJHL	70	24	23	47	52	4	0	3	3	4
2005–06	Shawinigan Cataractes	QMJHL	55	26	48	74	66	5	1	3	4	4
2006–07	Shawinigan Cataractes	QMJHL	68	29	44	73	37	4	1	1	2	8
2007–08	Chicoutimi Saguenéens	QMJHL	69	54	48	102	54	6	5	3	8	4
2008–09	Grand Rapids Griffins	AHL	63	24	24	48	14	10	2	2	4	2
2009–10	Grand Rapids Griffins	AHL	77	16	23	39	20	—	—	—	—	—
2010–11	Grand Rapids Griffins	AHL	80	24	30	54	49	—	—	—	—	—
2011–12	Grand Rapids Griffins	AHL	75	16	36	52	18	—	—	—	—	—
2012–13	Grand Rapids Griffins	AHL	68	22	22	44	37	24	3	9	12	12
2013–14	TPS	Liiga	30	13	15	28	4	—	—	—	—	—
2013–14	Metallurg Magnitogorsk	KHL	20	7	2	9	0	21	7	2	9	6
2014–15	Metallurg Magnitogorsk	KHL	35	4	4	8	20	—	—	—	—	—
2014–15	Traktor Chelyabinsk	KHL	23	10	5	15	8	5	1	1	2	4
2015–16	Traktor Chelyabinsk	KHL	14	3	1	4	2	—	—	—	—	—
2015–16	HC Slovan Bratislava	KHL	16	3	2	5	0	—	—	—	—	—
2015–16	TPS	Liiga	18	10	4	14	18	8	2	2	4	26
2016–17	KHL Medveščak Zagreb	KHL	51	10	26	36	18	—	—	—	—	—
2016–17	Genève–Servette HC	NLA	8	5	6	11	2	2	1	0	1	0
2017–18	Avtomobilist Yekaterinburg	KHL	49	11	18	29	10	6	2	1	3	0
2018–19	Avtomobilist Yekaterinburg	KHL	58	16	19	35	8	5	1	0	1	4
2019–20	Dinamo Minsk	KHL	52	11	9	20	35	—	—	—	—	—
2020–21	Dinamo Minsk	KHL	35	3	7	10	6	5	0	1	1	2
2021–22	Avangard Omsk	KHL	16	2	2	4	4	—	—	—	—	—
AHL totals			363	102	135	237	138	34	5	11	16	14
KHL totals			369	80	95	175	111	42	11	5	16	16

=== International ===
Year	Team	Event	Result	GP	G	A	Pts	PIM
2004	Canada Quebec	U17	3rd place, bronze medalist(s)	6	2	7	9	4
2021	Belarus	WC	15th	6	0	1	1	0
2021	Belarus	OGQ	DNQ	3	0	1	1	2
Junior totals				6	2	7	9	4
Senior totals				9	0	2	2	2

== Awards and honours ==
Award	Year
QMJHL
First All-Star Team	2008
Michel Brière Memorial Trophy	2008
CHL Second All-Star Team	2008
