= Kevin Marshall =

Canadian ice hockey defenceman

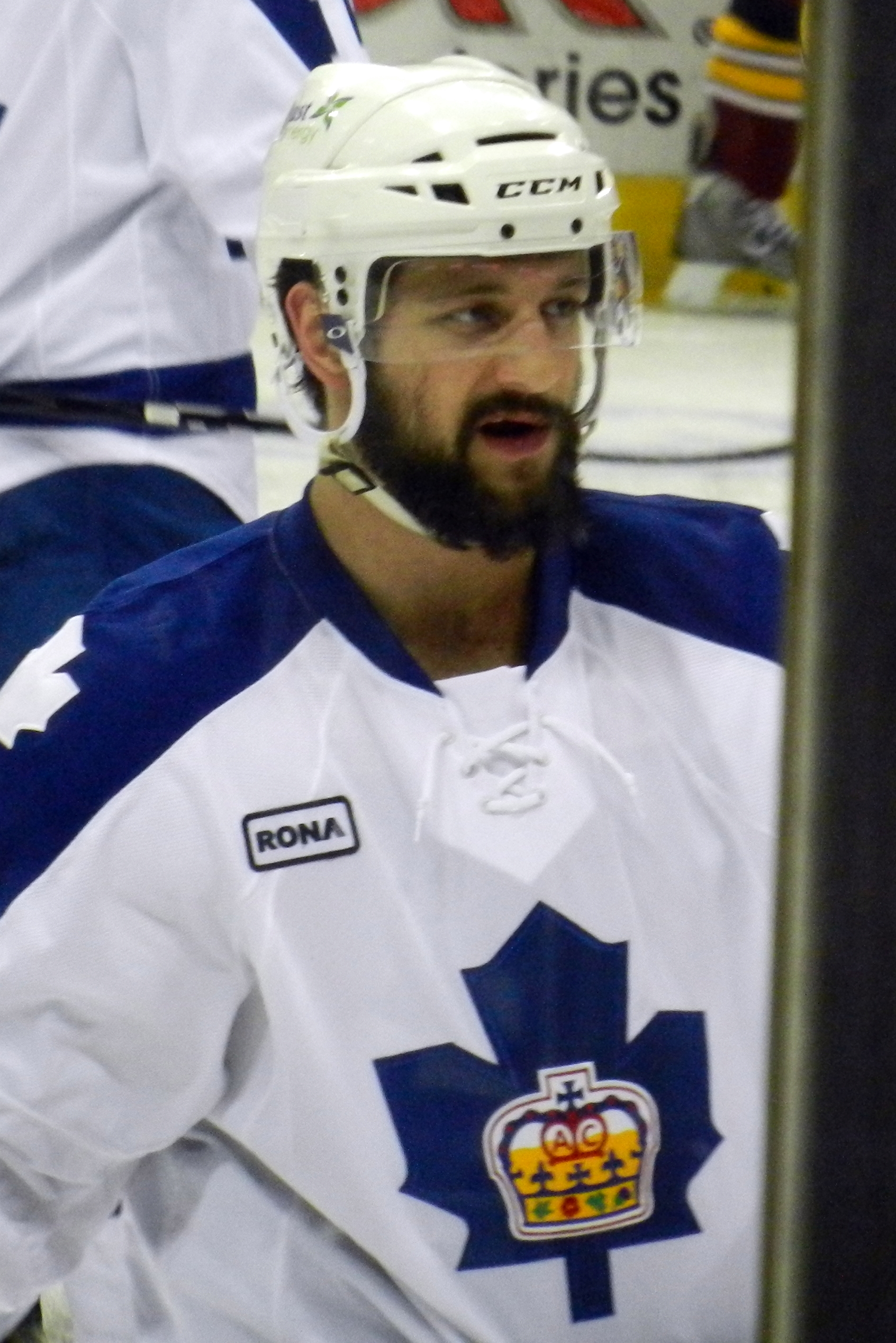
- Marshall in 2013
- Born: March 10, 1989 (age 37) Boucherville, Quebec, Canada
- Height: 6 ft 1 in (185 cm)
- Weight: 201 lb (91 kg; 14 st 5 lb)
- Position: Defence
- Shot: Left
- Played for: Philadelphia Flyers; Rögle BK; Düsseldorfer EG
- NHL draft: 41st overall, 2007; Philadelphia Flyers
- Playing career: 2009–2019

Kevin Marshall (born March 10, 1989) is a Canadian former professional ice hockey defenceman who played for the Philadelphia Flyers in the National Hockey League (NHL).

== Playing career ==
Marshall was drafted in the second round, 41st overall, of the 2007 NHL entry draft by the Philadelphia Flyers. He began his professional career in 2009 with Philadelphia's AHL affiliate, the Adirondack Phantoms, and spent most of the next three seasons with the Phantoms. He made his NHL debut on November 21, 2011 against the Carolina Hurricanes and played a total of ten games with the Flyers before being sent back down to the Phantoms. On February 2, 2012, Marshall was traded to the Washington Capitals for Matt Ford.

During the following 2012–13 season on March 14, 2013, Marshall was traded by the Capitals to the Toronto Maple Leafs in exchange for Nicolas Deschamps.

In the 2017–18 season, Marshall, in the midst of his third Swedish Hockey League campaign with Rögle BK and after playing 13 games on loan with HockeyAllsvenskan club IK Oskarshamn, opted to leave the club, transferring to German DEL club Düsseldorfer EG on November 10, 2017.

Following his second season with DEG in 2018–19 and after a first-round defeat to the Augsburger Panther, Marshall announced his retirement from his 10-year professional career.

== Career statistics ==
=== Regular season and playoffs ===
			Regular season					Playoffs
Season	Team	League	GP	G	A	Pts	PIM	GP	G	A	Pts	PIM
2005–06	Lewiston Maineiacs	QMJHL	60	1	10	11	112	6	0	1	1	14
2006–07	Lewiston Maineiacs	QMJHL	70	5	27	32	141	17	0	7	7	38
2007–08	Lewiston Maineiacs	QMJHL	66	11	24	35	143	6	1	1	2	12
2008–09	Quebec Remparts	QMJHL	61	9	29	38	125	17	1	10	11	32
2009–10	Adirondack Phantoms	AHL	75	2	7	9	80	—	—	—	—	—
2010–11	Adirondack Phantoms	AHL	78	3	11	14	120	—	—	—	—	—
2011–12	Adirondack Phantoms	AHL	32	2	3	5	55	—	—	—	—	—
2011–12	Philadelphia Flyers	NHL	10	0	0	0	8	—	—	—	—	—
2011–12	Hershey Bears	AHL	31	0	1	1	61	5	0	2	2	10
2012–13	Hershey Bears	AHL	52	1	4	5	77	—	—	—	—	—
2012–13	Toronto Marlies	AHL	15	1	5	6	10	9	0	2	2	12
2013–14	Toronto Marlies	AHL	59	1	9	10	109	12	0	3	3	12
2014–15	Toronto Marlies	AHL	44	1	6	7	36	—	—	—	—	—
2015–16	Rögle BK	SHL	50	1	4	5	72	—	—	—	—	—
2016–17	Rögle BK	SHL	52	3	6	9	79	—	—	—	—	—
2017–18	Rögle BK	SHL	4	0	0	0	2	—	—	—	—	—
2017–18	IK Oskarshamn	Allsv	13	1	1	2	20	—	—	—	—	—
2017–18	Düsseldorfer EG	DEL	32	3	5	8	34	—	—	—	—	—
2018–19	Düsseldorfer EG	DEL	52	3	10	13	70	7	1	1	2	32
NHL totals			10	0	0	0	8	—	—	—	—	—

=== International ===
Year	Team	Event	Result	GP	G	A	Pts	PIM
2006	Canada Quebec	WHC17	1st place, gold medalist(s)	6	1	2	3	12
Junior totals				6	1	2	3	12

== Awards and honours ==
Award	Year
QMJHL
Second All-Star Team	2007–08
