= Kevin Desfossés =

Canadian ice hockey goaltender

- Born: May 2, 1987 (age 37); Beauport, Quebec, Canada
- Height: 6 ft 0 in (183 cm)
- Weight: 185 lb (84 kg; 13 st 3 lb)
- Position: Goaltender
- Caught: Left
- Played for: Port Huron Icehawks; Corpus Christi Icerays; Laredo Bucks; Bisons de Neuilly-sur-Marne; HC Pustertal Wölfe
- Playing career: 2008–2016

Kevin Desfossés (born May 2, 1987) is a Canadian former professional ice hockey goaltender. He was born in Beauport, Quebec (now Quebec City).

== Career ==
Desfossés played junior hockey in the Saskatchewan Junior Hockey League for the Flin Flon Bombers and the Humboldt Broncos, playing one game for each team, and in the Quebec Major Junior Hockey League for the Quebec Remparts. With the Remparts, he won the Memorial Cup in 2006 and was named into the QMJHL's First All-Star team in 2008.

After a brief spell in McGill University, Desfossés signed his first professional contract with the Port Huron Icehawks of the International Hockey League during the 2008–09 season. He then split the 2009–10 season in the Central Hockey League for the Corpus Christi Icerays and the Laredo Bucks. On June 14, 2010, he moved to France and signed for Bisons de Neuilly-sur-Marne of the FFHG Division 1 where he won a league championship with the team. The following year, he returned to Canada to sign for Thetford Mines Isothermic of the Ligue Nord-Américaine de Hockey. On January 30, 2012, Desfossés signed for HC Pustertal Wölfe of Serie A.

== Awards and honours ==
Award	Year
Memorial Cup Champion	2005–06
QMJHL First team All-Star	2007–08
