= K. C. Irving Regional Centre =

Multipurpose arena in Bathurst, New Brunswick

Coordinates: 47.628597°N 65.680918°W

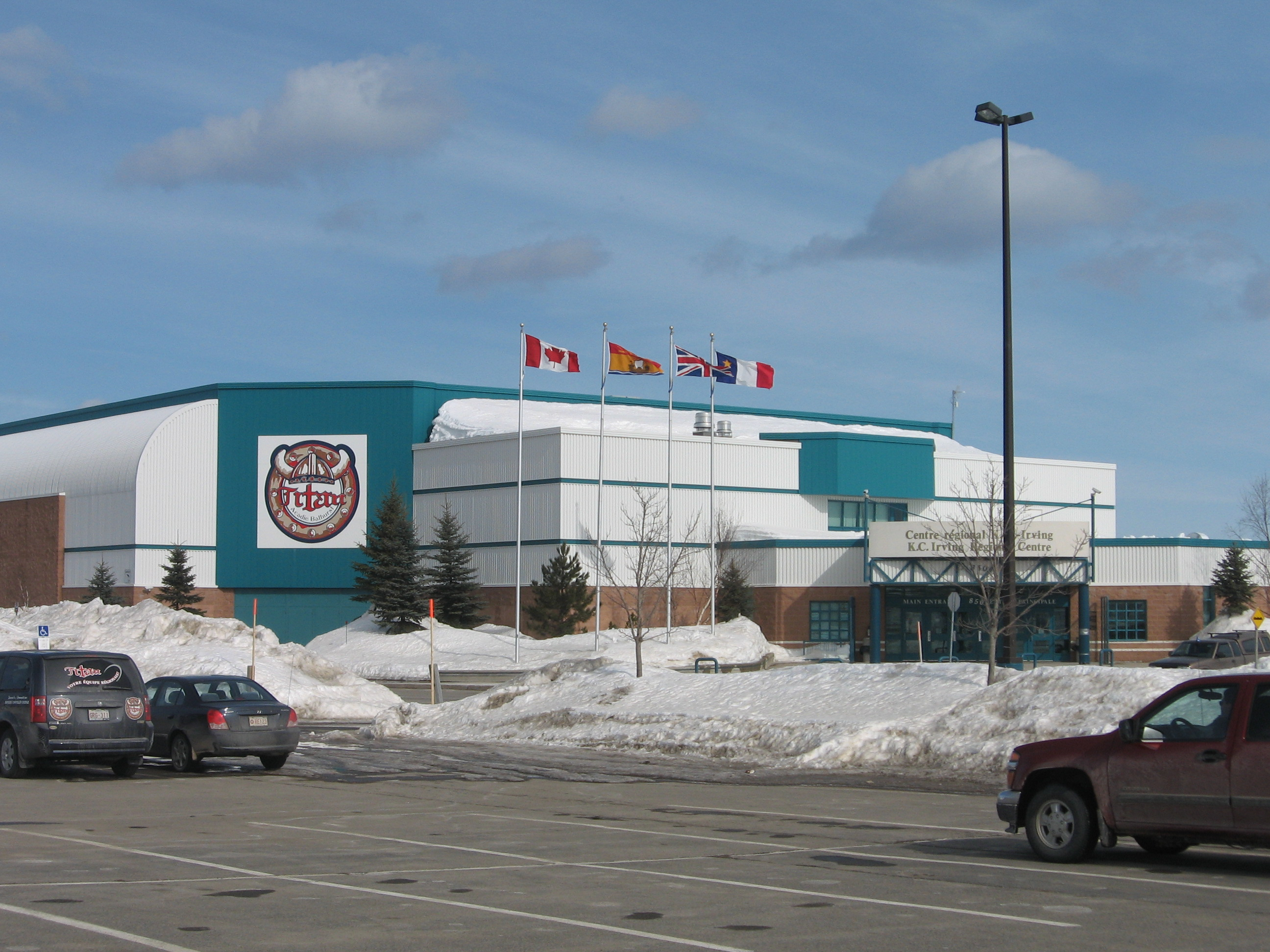

- Location within New Brunswick Location within Canada
- Address: 850 Sainte-Anne Street
- Location: Bathurst, New Brunswick
- Owner: City of Bathurst
- Capacity: Hockey: 3,162 seats (Maximum: 3,524)
- Surface: 200 × 85 feet (61 m × 25.9 m)

Construction
- Opened: 1996

Tenants
- Acadie–Bathurst Titan (QMJHL) (1998–2025); Bathurst Bears (ECBL) (2023-2024); Chaleur Lightning (MHL) (2025–present)

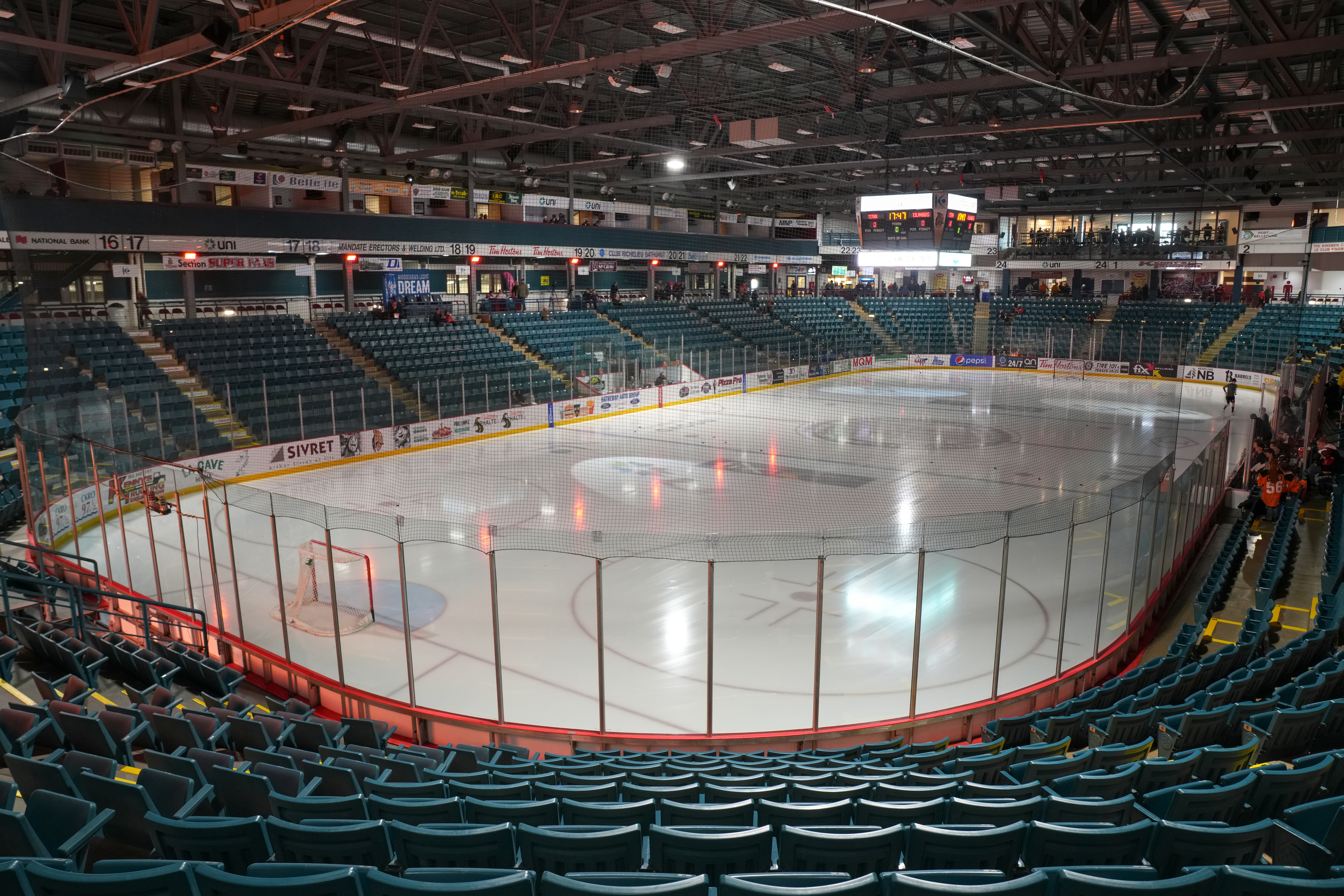
Inside the K. C. Irving Regional Centre

The K.C. Irving Regional Centre (French: Centre Régional K.C. Irving) is an indoor arena located in Bathurst, New Brunswick. The KC Irving is home to the Chaleur Lightning of the Maritime Junior Hockey League (MHL). The arena was home to the Acadie–Bathurst Titan of the QMJHL from 1998–2025. It was named in honour of businessman K. C. Irving. Opened in September 1996 and built at a cost of $21 million, it is the largest arena in north-eastern New Brunswick.

There are 3,162 seats for a total capacity of 3,524 at the hockey games. For entertainment, the capacity may be expanded to 4,400. Around the rink there are 24 private boxes. The arena has two ice rinks: "The Eddy Rink" where the Acadie-Bathurst Titan played their home games on also where the seating capacity is located, and "The Richelieu" rink which is the home of The Bathurst High School Phantoms Boys and Girls hockey teams and is hosts to many minor hockey, figure skating and other events with a smaller seating area. The centre also has many canteens and a walking track as well as a gift shop and the offices of the City Of Bathurst Parks, Recreation and Tourism Department. The operations of the centre are run by the City Of Bathurst and their union workers from CUPE Locals 550 (Outside Workers) and CUPE Local 4632 Kc Irving Event staff and Security

== Banners ==
President's Cup (including President's Cup of the club when the franchise was operating at Laval)

- 1983-84, 1988-89, 1989-90, 1992-93, 1998-99, 2017-18

" Hardy Cup" ""(Won by the 1972 Bathurst Alpine Papermakers) at the former Bathurst Arena also known as "The Barn"

- Note

The Hardy Cup, was the Canadian national Intermediate "A" ice hockey championship from 1967 until 1984. From 1985 until 1990, the Hardy Cup was the Canadian national senior championship for Senior "AA" after senior and intermediate hockey were merged by the Canadian Amateur Hockey Association. The trophy was retired to the Hockey Hall of Fame in 1990.

Retired numbers (including players of the club when the franchise was operating at Laval)

- 10 - Claude Lapointe
- 17 - Mike Bossy
- 19 - Neil Carnes
- 21 - Vincent Damphousse
- 22 - Martin Lapointe
- 30 - Gino Odjick
- 37 - Patrice Bergeron *First Retired jersey from The Acadie Bathurst Titan since relocating from Laval PQ
- 66 - Mario Lemieux
- 1 - Roberto Luongo* Second retired jersey from The Acadie Bathurst Titan since relocating from Laval PQ
