= 2009–10 GMHL season =

- League: Greater Metro Junior A Hockey League
- Sport: Hockey
- Duration: Regular season 2009-09 – 2010-02; Playoffs; 2010-02 – 2010-04
- Teams: 12
- Finals champions: Deseronto Storm

GMHL seasons
- 2008–09 2010–11

The 2009–10 GMHL season was the fourth season of the Greater Metro Junior A Hockey League (GMHL). The twelve teams of the GMHL played 42-game schedules.

In February 2010, the top teams of the league played down for the Russell Cup, emblematic of the grand championship of the GMHL. Since the GMHL is independent from Hockey Canada and the Canadian Junior Hockey League, this is where the GMHL's season ended. The Deseronto Storm won their first Russell Cup beating the South Muskoka Shield 4-games-to-3.

== Changes ==
- Expansion was granted to Algoma Avalanche.
- Ville-Marie Dragons, which did not finish the 2008-09 season, moved and became Powassan Dragons.
- Nipissing Alouettes, Richmond Hill Rams, and Espanola Kings were granted leaves of absence.
- Ville-Marie Voyageurs were announced, but failed to start the season.
- Minden Riverkings folded mid-season, on November 11, 2009.

Twelve teams started the season, and played as one division rather than two divisions, as the league operated in the previous year.

== Final standings ==
Note: GP = Games played; W = Wins; L = Losses; OTL = Overtime losses; SL = Shootout losses; GF = Goals for; GA = Goals against; PTS = Points; x = clinched playoff berth; y = clinched division title; z = clinched conference title

Teams
Team	Centre	2009-10 Record	GF	GA	Points
Elliot Lake Bobcats	Elliot Lake	35-4-0-3	297	152	73
South Muskoka Shield	Gravenhurst	35-5-0-2	228	121	72
Bradford Rattlers	Bradford	34-6-0-2	273	150	70
Deseronto Storm	Deseronto	29-11-0-2	222	152	60
Innisfil Lakers	Innisfil	26-14-0-2	210	194	54
Brock Bucks	Beaverton	20-18-0-4	178	207	44
King Wild	Nobleton	18-20-0-4	212	205	40
Algoma Avalanche	Thessalon	19-22-0-1	162	196	39
Toronto Canada Moose	Thornhill	15-23-0-4	172	212	34
Oro-Medonte 77's	Guthrie	11-26-0-5	145	272	27
Powassan Dragons	Powassan	8-32-0-2	139	271	18
Minden Riverkings	Minden Hills	2-13-0-0	56	87	4

Top seven teams (blue tinted) receive automatic bye into GMHL Quarter-finals. Minden Riverkings ceased operation November 11, 2009. Remaining games are treated as 3-0 forfeits.

Teams listed on the official league website.

Standings listed on official league website.

== 2009-10 Russell Cup Playoffs ==
=== Championship round ===
QF is Best-of-5, SF and Final are Best-of-7

Quarter-final
1	Elliot Lake	3
8	Algoma	0
4	Deseronto	3
5	Innisfil	0
2	South Muskoka	3
7	King	0
3	Bradford	3
6	Brock	0

Semi-final
1	Elliot Lake	2
4	Deseronto	4
2	South Muskoka	4
3	Bradford	1

Russell Cup
4	Deseronto	4
2	South Muskoka	3

=== Last Minute Qualifier ===
Determines 8th seed in Quarter-final.

Single Game
8	Algoma	6
11	Powassan	2
9	Toronto	6
10	Oro-Medonte	4

Best-of-3
8	Algoma	2
9	Toronto	1

Playoff results are listed on the official league website.

== Scoring leaders ==
Note: GP = Games played; G = Goals; A = Assists; Pts = Points; PIM = Penalty minutes

Player	Team	GP	G	A	Pts	PIM
Brad Clark	Deseronto Storm	41	59	68	127	104
Artem Podshendyalov	Bradford Rattlers	42	62	62	124	48
Andrew Bobas	Deseronto Storm	41	31	57	88	136
Dylan Sontag	South Muskoka Shield	42	41	44	85	24
Jeff Morris	Deseronto Storm	41	27	57	84	87
Jonathon Dew	Innisfil Lakers	32	36	45	81	50
Stanislav Nikonov	Bradford Rattlers	41	36	40	76	49
Matt Marchese	King Wild	41	36	39	75	99
Jon Minard	Toronto Canada Moose	38	36	37	73	40
Roman Jurak	Elliot Lake Bobcats	42	24	45	69	12

== Leading goaltenders ==
Note: GP = Games played; Mins = Minutes played; W = Wins; L = Losses: OTL = Overtime losses; SL = Shootout losses; GA = Goals Allowed; SO = Shutouts; GAA = Goals against average

Player	Team	GP	Mins	W	L	OTL	SOL	GA	SO	Sv%	GAA
Rob Sutherland	South Muskoka Shield	13	778	10	3	-	-	22	2	0.949	1.70
Matthew Perry	Elliot Lake Bobcats	20	864	16	4	-	-	39	1	0.920	2.71
Keaton Op't Eyndt	Bradford Rattlers	16	728	14	2	-	-	35	2	0.917	2.88
Mark Wardell	South Muskoka Shield	20	1125	16	4	-	-	56	0	0.902	2.99
Blake Robinson	Elliot Lake Bobcats	11	551	10	1	-	-	30	0	0.910	3.27

== Awards ==
- Top Defensive Forward - Chad Meagher (South Muskoka Shield)
- Rookie of the Year - Matis Matus (Bradford Rattlers)
- Top Forward - Artem Podshendyalov (Bradford Rattlers)
- Most Sportsmanlike Player - Dylan Sontag (South Muskoka Shield)
- Top Defenceman - Adam MacBeth (South Muskoka Shield)
- Most Heart - David Secfic (Elliot Lake Bobcats)
- Top Goaltender - Mark Wardell (South Muskoka Shield)
- Top Scorer - Brad Clark (Deseronto Storm)
- Most Valuable Player - Brad Clark (Deseronto Storm)
- Official of the Year - Darren Long
- Coach of the Year - Dallyn Telford (South Muskoka Shield)

== See also ==
- 2009 in ice hockey
- 2010 in ice hockey

Preceded by 2008–09 GMHL season	GMHL seasons	Succeeded by 2010–11 GMHL season
