= 2007–08 GMHL season =

- League: Greater Metro Junior A Hockey League
- Sport: Hockey
- Duration: Regular season 2007-09 – 2008-02; Playoffs; 2008-02 – 2008-04
- Teams: 13
- Finals champions: Bradford Rattlers

GMHL seasons
- 2006–07 2008–09

The 2007–08 GMHL season was the second season of the Greater Metro Junior A Hockey League (GMHL). The thirteen teams of the GMHL will play 42-game schedules.

February 2008, the top teams of the league played down for the Russell Cup, emblematic of the grand championship of the GMHL. Since the GMHL is independent from Hockey Canada and the Canadian Junior Hockey League, this is where the GMHL's season ended. The Bradford Rattlers won their second Russell cup in as many years beating the Innisfil Lakers 4-games-to-none.

== Changes ==
- Deseronto Thunder become Deseronto Storm
- League expands by six teams: Douro Dukes, Elliot Lake Bobcats, Espanola Kings, Innisfil Lakers, Tamworth Cyclones, Temiscaming Royals

== Final standings ==
Note: GP = Games played; W = Wins; L = Losses; OTL = Overtime Losses; SL = Shootout Losses; GF = Goals For.

Team	Centre	2007-08 Record	GF	GA	Points
Bradford Rattlers	Bradford	37-4-0-1	314	110	75
Temiscaming Royals	Témiscaming	31-9-0-2	258	135	64
Innisfil Lakers	Innisfil	29-10-0-3	228	129	61
Deseronto Storm	Deseronto	27-13-0-2	219	158	56
Elliot Lake Bobcats	Elliot Lake	26-13-0-3	202	164	55
Richmond Hill Rams	Richmond Hill	25-15-0-2	225	165	52
South Muskoka Shield	Gravenhurst	19-17-0-5	207	206	43
King Wild	King City	20-20-0-2	186	179	42
Espanola Kings	Espanola	15-26-0-1	151	226	31
Toronto Canada Moose	Thornhill	14-27-0-1	154	254	29
Nipissing Alouettes	Sturgeon Falls	14-27-0-1	178	266	29
Tamworth Cyclones	Tamworth	13-25-0-3	208	251	29
Douro Dukes	Douro	2-40-0-0	108	392	4

The top 5 teams (blue shaded rows) were given their choice of opponent from the bottom five (purple) or taking a first round bye. Places 6 through 8 had to wait for decisions of the top 5 teams to determine playoff activity.

Teams listed on the official league website.

Standings listed on official league website.

== 2007-08 Russell Cup Playoffs ==
Bye round
1	Bradford	4
11	Toronto	0
4	Deseronto	4
10	Tamworth	0
5	Elliot Lake	4
12	Nipissing	1
2	Temiscaming	4
9	Espanola	0
8	King	4
13	Douro	0

Quarter-finals
1	Bradford	4
7	South Muskoka	1
4	Deseronto	2
5	Elliot Lake	4
2	Temiscaming	4
8	King	2
3	Innisfil	4
6	Richmond Hill	3

Semi-finals
1	Bradford	4
5	Elliot Lake	0
2	Temiscaming	2
3	Innisfil	4

Final
1	Bradford	4
3	Innisfil	0

Due to the playoff draft, Innisfil, Richmond Hill and South Muskoka elected to take first round byes.

Playoff results are listed on the official league website.

== Moscow Selects exhibition series ==
From late December 2007 until mid-January 2008 the best teams of the GMHL faced off against the all-star team of a Moscow-based Junior A league, this was supposed to be finished off with a game between the Moscow Selects and the GMHL All-Star team but Moscow cancelled this game.

Moscow Selects 7 - Innisfil Lakers 3
Moscow Selects 8 - Bradford Rattlers 4
Moscow Selects 9 - Elliot Lake Bobcats 2
Moscow Selects 7 - Richmond Hill Rams 4
Moscow Selects 5 - South Muskoka Shield 1
Moscow Selects 9 - Temiscaming Royals 3
Moscow Selects 7 - Deseronto Storm 1

== Scoring leaders ==
Note: GP = Games played; G = Goals; A = Assists; Pts = Points; PIM = Penalty Minutes

Player / Team / GP / G / A / Pts / PIM; Adam Palm / Bradford Rattlers / - / 34 / 68 / 102 / -

== Leading goaltenders ==
Note: GP = Games played; Mins = Minutes Played; W = Wins; L = Losses: OTL = Overtime Losses; SL = Shootout Losses; GA = Goals Allowed; SO = Shutouts; GAA = Goals Against Average

Player / Team / GP / Mins / W / L / GA / SO / GAA

== Awards ==
- Most Valuable Player - Jonathon Dew (Innisfil Lakers)
- Top Scorer - Adam Palm (Bradford Rattlers)
- Top Defenceman - Dave Malicek (Bradford Rattlers)
- Top Goaltender - Daniel Jones (Richmond Hill Rams)
- Top Forward - Sochiro Omi (Bradford Rattlers)
- Rookie of the Year - Phil Grainger (Innisfil Lakers)
- Most Heart - Brad Clark (Deseronto Storm)
- Most Sportsmanlike Player - Andrew Quinn (Elliot Lake Bobcats)
- Top Defensive Forward - Connor Hendry (Innisfil Lakers)
- Coach of the Year - Ryan Leonard (Elliot Lake Bobcats)
- Official of the Year - Ryan Harrison

== See also ==
- 2007 in ice hockey
- 2008 in ice hockey

Preceded by 2006–07 GMHL season	GMHL seasons	Succeeded by 2008–09 GMHL season
