= 2011–12 GMHL season =

- League: Greater Metro Junior A Hockey League
- Sport: Hockey
- Duration: Regular season 2011-09-09 – 2012-02-20; Playoffs; 2012-02-20 – 2012-03-31
- Teams: 14
- Finals champions: Sturgeon Falls Lumberjacks

GMHL seasons
- 2010–11 2012–13

The 2011–12 GMHL season was the sixth season of the Greater Metro Junior A Hockey League (GMHL). The fourteen teams of the GMHL played 42-game schedules.

Starting in February 2012, the top teams of the league played down for the Russell Cup, emblematic of the grand championship of the GMHL. Since the GMHL is independent from Hockey Canada and the Canadian Junior Hockey League, this is where the GMHL's season ended. The league champion was the Sturgeon Falls Lumberjacks as they defeated the Temiscaming Titans 4-games-to-2.

== Changes ==
- Expansion granted to the Orangeville Americans.
- Expansion granted to the Mattawa Voyageurs.
- Expansion granted to the Temiscaming Titans.
- Expansion granted to the Vaughan Stars.
- Powassan Dragons renamed the Powassan Eagles.
- Vaughan Wild moved and renamed the Lefroy Wave.
- Oro-Medonte 77's leave league.
- Jamestown Jets leave league over arena dispute.
- Halton Huskies granted expansion for 2012-13.
- Powassan Eagles take one-year leave.
- Vaughan Stars league membership revoked November 28, 2011.

== Current standings ==
Note: GP = Games played; W = Wins; L = Losses; OTL = Overtime losses; SL = Shootout losses; GF = Goals for; GA = Goals against; PTS = Points; x = clinched playoff berth; y = clinched division title; z = clinched conference title

Standings
Team	Centre	W–L–OTL	GF–GA	Points
Temiscaming Titans	Temiscaming, QC	38-3-1	273-120	77
Sturgeon Falls Lumberjacks	Sturgeon Falls	35-7-0	312-170	70
Bradford Rattlers	Bradford	31-6-5	221-127	67
South Muskoka Shield	Gravenhurst	29-9-4	255-126	62
Elliot Lake Bobcats	Elliot Lake	28-11-3	236-145	59
Lefroy Wave	Lefroy	23-18-1	179-186	47
Deseronto Storm	Deseronto	22-17-3	193-193	47
Orangeville Americans	Orangeville	19-18-5	172-174	43
Mattawa Voyageurs	Mattawa	19-21-2	170-206	40
Toronto Canada Moose	Thornhill	17-23-2	153-211	36
Vaughan Stars	Vaughan	11-4-1	76-59	23
Shelburne Red Wings	Shelburne	8-32-2	116-263	18
Bobcaygeon Bucks	Bobcaygeon	8-34-0	131-256	16
Algoma Avalanche	Thessalon	6-34-2	115-288	14

Vaughan is shaded due to their membership being revoked during a league meeting November 28, 2011 for failing to attend mandatory GMHL Showcase Tournament. Their remaining 26 games were awarded to their opponents as 3–0 victories.

Teams listed on the official league website.

Standings listed on official league website.

== 2011–12 Russell Cup Playoffs ==
Bye Round
8	Orangeville	2
9	Mattawa	0
4	South Muskoka	2
13	Algoma	0
5	Elliot Lake	2
12	Bobcaygeon	1
7	Deseronto	2
10	Toronto	0
6	Lefroy	2
11	Shelburne	0

Quarter-finals
1	Temiscaming	3
8	Orangeville	0
4	South Muskoka	3
5	Elliot Lake	1
2	Sturgeon Falls	3
7	Deseronto	2
3	Bradford	3
6	Lefroy	2

Semi-finals
1	Temiscaming	4
4	South Muskoka	0
2	Sturgeon Falls	4
3	Bradford	0

Russell Cup Final
1	Temiscaming	2
2	Sturgeon Falls	4

Playoff results are listed on the official league website.

== All-Star Game ==
The 2011–12 GMHL All-Star Game was hosted by Gravenhurst, Ontario on January 10, 2012.

Result:

Team North America 9 - Team World 7

== Scoring leaders ==
Note: GP = Games played; G = Goals; A = Assists; Pts = Points; PIM = Penalty minutes

Player	Team	GP	G	A	Pts	PIM
Andre Leclair	Temiscaming Titans	39	56	66	122	90
Illes Gallo	Sturgeon Falls Lumberjacks	42	45	66	111	110
Robin Mendelsohn	Temiscaming Titans	40	45	59	104	14
DJ Tahbazian	Temiscaming Titans	42	32	58	90	32
John Sweet	Deseronto Storm	31	48	39	87	29
Maciej Rompkowski	Sturgeon Falls Lumberjacks	35	32	55	87	81
Dylan Sontag	South Muskoka Shield	39	30	57	87	29
Atte Koopikka	Sturgeon Falls Lumberjacks	42	37	46	83	32
Donny Danroth	South Muskoka Shield	40	39	40	79	78
David Amnas	Sturgeon Falls Lumberjacks	28	38	39	77	30

== Leading goaltenders ==
Note: GP = Games played; Mins = Minutes played; W = Wins; L = Losses: OTL = Overtime losses; SL = Shootout losses; GA = Goals Allowed; SO = Shutouts; GAA = Goals against average

Player	Team	GP	Mins	W	L	GA	SO	Sv%	GAA
Aaron Boyce	Temiscaming Titans	11	621	9	1	25	1	0.929	2.42
Carson Bird	Bradford Rattlers	16	954	11	4	44	1	0.922	2.77
Mark Andrews	Orangeville Americans	18	948	7	8	53	2	0.920	3.35
Rob Sutherland	Bradford Rattlers	16	922	10	6	54	1	0.917	3.51
Reilly Turner	Temiscaming Titans	21	1143	17	3	62	1	0.912	3.25

== Awards ==
- Scoring Leader - Andre Leclair (Temiscaming Titans)
- Most Valuable Player - Andre Leclair (Temiscaming Titans)
- Top Forward - Illes Gallo (Sturgeon Falls Lumberjacks)
- Top Defensive Forward - Myles Neuneker (Bradford Rattlers)
- Top Defenseman - Ryan Tremmel (Lefroy Wave)
- Top Goalie - Andrew Selbie (Bobcaygeon Bucks)
- Top Rookie - Tomas Nemeth (Elliot Lake Bobcats)
- Most Sportsmanlike Player - John Sweet (Deseronto Storm)
- Heart Award - Tyler Roache (Lefroy Wave)
- Top Coach - Tyler Fines (Orangeville Americans)

== See also ==
- 2011 in ice hockey
- 2012 in ice hockey

Preceded by 2010–11 GMHL season	GMHL seasons	Succeeded by 2012–13 GMHL season
