= 2010–11 GMHL season =

- League: Greater Metro Junior A Hockey League
- Sport: Hockey
- Duration: Regular season 2010-09-10 – 2011-02-22; Playoffs; 2011-02-23 – 2011-04-02
- Teams: 13
- Finals champions: Elliot Lake Bobcats

GMHL seasons
- 2009–10 2011–12

The 2010–11 GMHL season was the fifth season of the Greater Metro Junior A Hockey League (GMHL). The thirteen teams of the GMHL played 42-game schedules.

Starting in February 2011, the top teams of the league played down for the Russell Cup, emblematic of the grand championship of the GMHL. Since the GMHL is independent from Hockey Canada and the Canadian Junior Hockey League, this is where the GMHL's season ended. The Elliot Lake Bobcats won their first Russell Cup by defeating the South Muskoka Shield 4-games-to-3.

== Changes ==
- Expansion granted to the Shelburne Red Wings.
- Expansion granted to the Sturgeon Falls Lumberjacks.
- Jamestown Jets join league from Northern Junior Hockey League.
- King Wild move to Concord, Ontario and become Vaughan Wild.
- Brock Bucks move to Bobcaygeon, Ontario and become Bobcaygeon Bucks.
- Innisfil Lakers leave league.

== Outdoor game ==
In mid-January, it was announced that the town of Iron Bridge, Ontario and its 500-seat Outdoor Arena would host a regular season game, known as the North Shore Winter Classic, between the Elliot Lake Bobcats and Algoma Avalanche on January 29, 2011. This is the first known regulation outdoor game in Ontario in the modern era. Elliot Lake would win the game 8–2 in front of an estimated 400 fans.

== Current standings ==
Note: GP = Games played; W = Wins; L = Losses; OTL = Overtime losses; SL = Shootout losses; GF = Goals for; GA = Goals against; PTS = Points; x = clinched playoff berth; y = clinched division title; z = clinched conference title

North
Team	Centre	W–L–OTL	GF–GA	Points
Elliot Lake Bobcats	Elliot Lake	38-2-2	320-144	78
South Muskoka Shield	Gravenhurst	35-5-1	280-151	71
Oro-Medonte 77's	Guthrie	14-21-6	171-223	34
Powassan Dragons	Powassan	15-25-2	195-274	32
Sturgeon Falls Lumberjacks	Sturgeon Falls	10-28-4	146-273	24
Algoma Avalanche	Thessalon	8-31-3	187-337	19
South
Team	Centre	W–L–OTL	GF–GA	Points
Jamestown Jets	Jamestown, NY	27-12-3	247-194	57
Bradford Rattlers	Bradford	26-14-2	239-178	54
Shelburne Red Wings	Shelburne	25-15-2	230-195	52
Bobcaygeon Bucks	Bobcaygeon	23-18-1	212-181	47
Deseronto Storm	Deseronto	20-21-1	181-211	41
Toronto Canada Moose	Thornhill	17-23-2	195-206	36
Vaughan Wild	Concord	13-24-5	173-215	31

Teams listed on the official league website.

Standings listed on official league website.

== 2010-11 Russell Cup Playoffs ==
Qualifier Round
N4	Powassan	2
N5	Sturgeon Falls	1
S3	Shelburne	0
S6	Toronto	2
N3	Oro-Medonte	2
N6	Algoma	0
S4	Bobcaygeon	0
S5	Deseronto	2

Quarter-final
1	Elliot Lake	3
8	Powassan	0
3	Jamestown	1
6	Toronto	3
2	South Muskoka	3
5	Oro-Medonte	0
4	Bradford	3
7	Deseronto	0

Semi-final
1	Elliot Lake	4
6	Toronto	0
2	South Muskoka	4
4	Bradford	3

Final
1	Elliot Lake	4
2	South Muskoka	3

=== Last minute qualifier ===
One game, winner take all for berth in qualifier round.

Last Minute Qualifier
S6	Toronto	9
S7	Vaughan	1

Playoff results are listed on the official league website.

== Scoring leaders ==
Note: GP = Games played; G = Goals; A = Assists; Pts = Points; PIM = Penalty minutes

Player	Team	GP	G	A	Pts	PIM
Alexander Nikulnikov	Shelburne Red Wings	41	69	71	140	80
Stanislav Dzakhov	Shelburne Red Wings	41	62	78	140	104
Nikita Jevpalovs	South Muskoka Shield	41	48	43	91	28
John Sweet	Deseronto Storm	42	39	50	89	56
Denis Zverev	Shelburne Red Wings	36	29	57	86	100
Pierre Mathez	Bradford Rattlers	40	38	46	84	22
Rob Childs	South Muskoka Shield	41	34	50	84	48
Dylan Sontag	South Muskoka Shield	31	33	48	81	22
Thomas Savioz	Toronto Canada Moose	41	29	51	80	44

== Leading goaltenders ==
Note: GP = Games played; Mins = Minutes played; W = Wins; L = Losses: OTL = Overtime losses; SL = Shootout losses; GA = Goals Allowed; SO = Shutouts; GAA = Goals against average

Player	Team	GP	Mins	W	L	GA	SO	Sv%	GAA
Matthew Perry	Elliot Lake Bobcats	14	779	13	1	40	0	.914	3.08
Tyler Ross	Elliot Lake Bobcats	17	835	12	0	43	0	.902	3.09
Anton Todykov	Jamestown Jets	17	796	11	3	43	0	.928	3.24
Rob Sutherland	South Muskoka Shield	32	1126	26	6	112	2	.901	3.44
Adrien Morel	Elliot Lake Bobcats	12	629	10	1	38	0	.878	3.62

== Awards ==
- Top Defensive Forward - David Sefcik (Elliot Lake Bobcats)
- Rookie of the Year - Nikita Jevpalovs (South Muskoka Shield)
- Top Forward - Nikita Jevpalovs (South Muskoka Shield)
- Most Sportsmanlike Player - Pierre Mathez (Bradford Rattlers)
- Top Defenceman - Tyler Nelson (Jamestown Jets)
- Most Heart - Mayus Matis (Bradford Rattlers)
- Top Goaltender - Rob Sutherland (South Muskoka Shield)
- Top Scorer - Stanislav Dzakhov/Alexander Nikulnikov (Shelburne Red Wings)
- Most Valuable Player - Alexander Nikulnikov (Shelburne Red Wings)
- Coach of the Year - Ryan Leonard (Elliot Lake Bobcats)

== See also ==
- 2010 in ice hockey
- 2011 in ice hockey

Preceded by 2009–10 GMHL season	GMHL seasons	Succeeded by 2011–12 GMHL season
