= 2012–13 GMHL season =

- League: Greater Metro Junior A Hockey League
- Sport: Hockey
- Duration: Regular season 2012-09-07 – 2013-02-17; Playoffs; 2013-02-18 – 2013-03-30
- Teams: 15
- Finals champions: Bradford Rattlers

GMHL seasons
- 2011–12 2013–14

The 2012–13 GMHL season was the seventh season of the Greater Metro Junior A Hockey League (GMHL). The fifteen teams of the GMHL played 42-game schedules.

Starting in February 2013, the top teams of the league played down for the Russell Cup, emblematic of the grand championship of the GMHL. Since the GMHL is independent from Hockey Canada and the Canadian Junior Hockey League, this is where the GMHL's season ended.

The Bradford Rattlers won their third regular season title with a perfect record of 42 wins and no losses. With a 14 win, 2 loss record, the Rattlers also won their third Russell Cup as league playoff champions with a 4-games-to-2 victory over the Temiscaming Titans.

== Changes ==
- Expansion granted to the Rama Aces.
- Powassan Eagles announce return.
- Expansion granted to the Bradford Bulls.
- Expansion granted to the Toronto Attack.
- Expansion granted to the Bracebridge Phantoms.
- Elliot Lake Bobcats leave league for Northern Ontario Junior Hockey League.
- Deseronto Storm leave league for Empire B Junior C Hockey League.
- Algoma Avalanche cease operations.

== Final standings ==
Note: GP = Games played; W = Wins; L = Losses; OTL = Overtime losses; SL = Shootout losses; GF = Goals for; GA = Goals against; PTS = Points; x = clinched playoff berth; y = clinched division title; z = clinched conference title

North
Team	Centre	W–L–T-OTL	GF–GA	Points
Temiscaming Titans	Temiscaming, QC	35-6-0-1	315-156	71
Bracebridge Phantoms	Bracebridge	28-12-0-2	263-174	58
South Muskoka Shield	Gravenhurst	27-13-0-2	219-168	56
Powassan Eagles	Powassan	25-13-2-2	194-171	54
Rama Aces	Rama	23-16-0-3	211-199	49
Sturgeon Falls Lumberjacks	Sturgeon Falls	15-27-0-0	195-234	30
Mattawa Voyageurs	Mattawa	10-30-1-1	169-289	22
South
Team	Centre	W–L–T-OTL	GF–GA	Points
Bradford Rattlers	Bradford	42-0-0-0	301-95	84
Toronto Attack	Toronto	21-21-0-0	185-187	42
Bradford Bulls	Bradford	20-20-0-2	182-195	42
Orangeville Americans	Orangeville	16-21-3-2	150-171	37
Shelburne Red Wings	Shelburne	17-25-0-0	191-230	34
Bobcaygeon Bucks	Bobcaygeon	16-25-1-0	158-214	33
Toronto Canada Moose	Thornhill	12-28-0-2	153-261	26
Lefroy Wave	Lefroy	4-35-1-2	110-252	11

Teams listed on the official league website.

Standings listed on official league website.

== 2012-13 Russell Cup Playoffs ==
Qualifier	Quarter-final
N1	Temiscaming	3
N7	Mattawa	0
N1	Temiscaming	3
N4	Powassan	0
N4	Powassan	3
N5	Rama	0
North
N2	Bracebridge	3
N3	South Muskoka	0
N3	South Muskoka	3
N6	Sturgeon Falls	0
S1	Brd Rattlers	3
S8	Lefroy	0
S1	Brd Rattlers	3
S6	Bobcaygeon	0
S3	Tor Attack	2
S6	Bobcaygeon	3
South
S2	Brd Bulls	3
S7	Tor Moose	1
S3	Brd Bulls	1
S4	Orangeville	3
S4	Orangeville	3
S5	Shelburne	2

Semi-final
N1	Temiscaming	4
N2	Bracebridge	3
S1	Brd Rattlers	4
S4	Orangeville	0

Final
N1	Temiscaming	2
S1	Brd Rattlers	4

Playoff results are listed on the official league website.

== Scoring leaders ==
Note: GP = Games played; G = Goals; A = Assists; Pts = Points; PIM = Penalty minutes

Player	Team	GP	G	A	Pts	PIM
Illes Gallo	Bradford Rattlers	38	47	61	108	153
Justin Norris	Temiscaming Titans	42	45	56	101	18
Jakub Vrana	Shelburne Red Wings	42	53	43	96	24
Vilem Opatmy	Shelburne Red Wings	41	35	61	96	38
Andreas Gurfeldt	Bradford Rattlers	42	21	72	93	26
Francis Beauregard	Temiscaming Titans	37	43	48	91	49
Conor Smith	Bradford Rattlers	41	48	42	90	64
John Sweet	Mattawa Voyageurs	42	30	58	88	45
Joey Verrenijen	Bracebridge Phantoms	40	29	58	87	83
Andrey Novikov	South Muskoka Shield	40	42	44	86	37

== Leading goaltenders ==
Note: GP = Games played; Mins = Minutes played; W = Wins; L = Losses: OTL = Overtime losses; SL = Shootout losses; GA = Goals Allowed; SO = Shutouts; GAA = Goals against average

Player	Team	GP	Mins	W	L	T	GA	SO	Sv%	GAA
Alfred Metz	Bradford Rattlers	16	946	16	0	0	29	3	0.941	1.84
Jonathon LoParco	Bradford Rattlers	21	1300	21	0	0	46	4	0.934	2.12
Anton Todykov	Shelburne Red Wings	24	1333	11	10	0	96	1	0.919	4.32
Mark Andrews	Orangeville Americans	25	1363	10	10	2	78	1	0.915	3.43
Donald Oldreive	Bradford Bulls	28	1494	13	12	0	100	0	0.910	4.02

== Awards ==
- Top Scorer: Illes Gallo (Rattlers)
- Most Valuable Player: Andreas Norrby (Rattlers)
- Rookie of the Year: Devon Gillham (Bulls)
- Top Forward: Illes Gallo (Rattlers)
- Top Defenceman: Andreas Norrby (Rattlers)
- Top Goaltender: Anton Todykov (Red Wings)
- Top Defensive Forward: Aaron Scott (Rattlers)
- Most Sportsmanlike Player: Glen Patterson (Bucks)
- Most Heart: Ricky Darrell (Aces)
- Top Coach: Johan Lundskog (Rattlers)

== See also ==
- 2012 in ice hockey
- 2013 in ice hockey

Preceded by 2011–12 GMHL season	GMHL seasons	Succeeded by 2013–14 GMHL season
