= West Nipissing Lynx =

- City: West Nipissing, Ontario, Canada
- League: Greater Metro Junior A Hockey League
- Founded: 2010
- Home arena: Sturgeon Falls Arena
- Colours: Black, yellow, and white
- General manager: Patrick Miron
- Head coach: Moe Mantha Jr.
- Website: westnipissinglynx.com

Franchise history
- 2010–2016: Sturgeon Falls Lumberjacks
- 2016–present: West Nipissing Lynx

The West Nipissing Lynx are a junior ice hockey team based in West Nipissing, Ontario, Canada. They play in the Greater Metro Junior A Hockey League (GMHL).

== History ==
The Sturgeon Falls Lumberjacks were announced in summer 2010. The Lumberjacks replaced the folded Nipissing Alouettes, who left the GMHL in 2009.

On September 10, 2010, the Lumberjacks played their first game against the Elliot Lake Bobcats in Elliot Lake. The Bobcats won the game 7–2. On September 12, 2010, the Lumberjacks played on the road against the Powassan Dragons and earned their franchise's first victory with a 5–2 win.

In their second season, the Lumberjacks finished second place in the GMHL with a record of 35 wins and 7 losses. In the league quarterfinals, the Lumberjacks faced the 2010 league champion Deseronto Storm and survived a five-game series 3-games-to-2. In the semifinals, Sturgeon Falls defeated the league's only two-time champion, the Bradford Rattlers, in a four-game sweep. In the finals, the Lumberjacks drew the first-seeded Temiscaming Titans. Despite being an expansion team, the Titans were created with the remnants of the Northern Ontario Junior Hockey League's Temiscaming Royals, and were a seasoned and tough team. The Titans finished the season ahead of the Lumberjacks with a record of 38 wins and 4 losses and were undefeated through two rounds of playoffs (7–0). The Lumberjacks quickly went up two games on the Titans, but were defeated in game three. The Lumberjacks took game four but the Titans took game five. Game six was in Sturgeon Falls and the Lumberjacks earned a 6–1 victory and their first Russell Cup as GMHL Champions.

On September 29, 2012, the Lumberjacks became the first GMHL club to ice a female hockey player. Goaltender Alyssa Moyer made her GMHL debut in a 7–5 loss to the Shelburne Red Wings, making 21 saves.

In January 2016, the team announced that it could not finish the 2015–16 season due to lack of uninjured players but planned to return for the 2016–17 season.

In June 2016, Lumberjacks' owner Lui Ricci sold the team to two local owners looking to re-energize the team. The team was then re-branded as the West Nipissing Lynx.

In May 2022, the team hired former NHL player Moe Mantha Jr. as their new head coach starting with the 2022–23 season.

== Season-by-season records ==
Season	GP	W	L	T	OTL	GF	GA	Pts	Regular season finish	Playoffs
Sturgeon Falls Lumberjacks
2010–11	42	10	28	—	4	146	273	24	12th GMHL	Lost Qualifier, 1–2 (Dragons)
2011–12	42	35	7	—	0	312	170	70	2nd GMHL	Won Quarter-finals, 3–2 (Storm; Won Semi-finals, 4–0 (Rattlers); Won Finals, 4–2 Titans
2012–13	42	15	27	0	0	195	234	30	12th of 15, GMHL	Lost Div. Quarter-finals, 0–3 (Shield)
2013–14	42	6	34	—	2	130	321	14	17th of 20, GMHL	Lost Qualifier Game, 8–9 (Bucks)
2014–15	42	11	31	—	0	130	292	22	5th of 10, North Div. 17th of 22, GMHL	Won Div. Qualifier Game, 5–4 OT (Spartans); Lost Div. Semi-finals, 0–3 (Titans)
2015–16	37	11	25	0	1	196	244	23	7th North Div. (Ceased play mid-season)	
West Nipissing Lynx
2016–17	42	13	28	—	1	184	268	27	9th of 10, North Div. 17th of 21, GMHL	Won 1st Rd. Qualifier Game, 6–5 (Huskies); Lost 8th Place Qualifier Game, 0–8 (Knights)
2017–18	42	15	24	0	3	198	228	33	7th of 9, North Div. 14th of 21, GMHL	Lost Div. Quarter-finals, 0–2 (Rattlers)
2018–19	42	20	19	0	3	189	203	43	6th of 10, North Div. 13th of 22, GMHL	Won Div. Quarter-finals, 2–1 (Titans); Lost Div. Semi-finals, 0–3 (Rattlers)
2019–20	42	16	25	0	1	177	231	33	8th of 10, North Div. 17th of 23, GMHL	Won 8th Place Qualifier Game, 7–3 (Shield); Lost Div. Quarter-finals, 0–2 (Titans)
2020–21	Lost season to COVID-19 pandemic									
2021–22	38	11	24	0	3	115	191	25	7th of 10, North Div. 13th of 19, GMHL	Lost Div. Quarter-finals, 0–2 (Rattlers)
2022–23	42	16	26	0	0	136	197	32	5th of 9, North Div. 11th of 16, GMHL	Lost Div. Quarter-finals, 0–2 (Titans)
2023–24	42	26	12	0	4	237	151	56	3rd of 7, North Div. 4th of 16, GMHL	Won Div. Quarter-finals, 2-0 (Le Becard De Senneterre); Won Div. Semifinals, 3-1 (Ville-Marie Pirates); Lost Div Finals, 0-4 (Rattlers)
2024–25	42	25	14	0	2	199	171	53	3rd of 6, North Div. 6th of 15, GMHL	Lost Div. Quarter-finals, 0-2 (Knights)
2025–26	42	22	16	0	4	200	163	48	3rd of 6, North Div. 5th of 14, GMHL	Won Div. Quarter-finals, 2-0 (Knights); Won Div Semifinals 3-2 (Rattlers); Lost Div Finals 2-4 (Dragons)
