= Wiarton Rock =

- City: Wiarton, Ontario, Canada
- League: Greater Metro Junior A Hockey League
- Founded: 2006
- Folded: 2016
- Home arena: Wiarton Arena & Community Centre
- Colours: Blue, Red, and White
- General manager: Tina Ziel
- Head coach: Joe Ziel

Franchise history
- 2006–2010: King Wild
- 2010–2011: Vaughan Wild
- 2011–2014: Lefroy Wave
- 2014–2016: Grey Highlands Bravehearts
- 2016: Wiarton Rock

The Wiarton Rock was a Canadian Junior ice hockey team based in Wiarton, Ontario, and a member of the Greater Metro Junior A Hockey League (GMHL). The Rock relocated multiple times, spending time in King City, Nobleton, Lefroy, and Markdale, Ontario.

== History ==
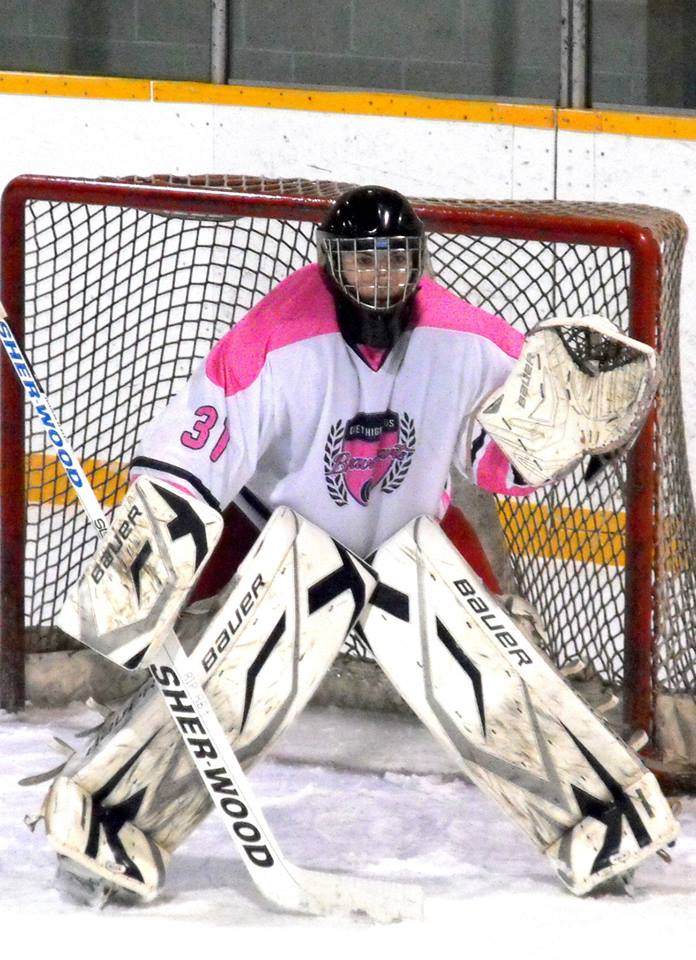
Bravehearts goalie on Breast Cancer Awareness night during 2014–15 season.

The King Wild's first game was the first game in the GMHL's history taking place on September 8, 2006, against the Richmond Hill Rams in Richmond Hill, Ontario. The Wild lost 6–0 to the Rams despite outshooting them. The Wild's first victory was a 5-1 decision over the Toronto Canada Moose on September 9, 2006. The team's first home game was against the Nipissing Alouettes on September 10, 2006. The Wild were victorious, winning by a 5–3 score.

The 2006–07 finalists started the 2007–08 season off rather slow. After playing poorly for most of the season, the Wild surged in the last quarter with a long winning streak to pull to a .500 record by the final regular season game. In the bye round of the playoffs, all byes had been picked and the final two teams remaining were the Wild and the Douro Dukes who would play in the first round by default. Although the Dukes played well, the Wild swept the series 4–0. The Wild continued to play well against the Temiscaming Royals in the league quarter-finals, but were still defeated by the second-seeded team in six games.

In March 2008, the Wild and the Richmond Hill Rams challenged the Mexico national ice hockey team to a set of four exhibition games. The first of two games for the Wild happened on March 22, as the Wild defeated the Mexican Senior team 7–6 in overtime. On March 25, the Wild beat them again 7–6, this time in regulation.

At the 2010 Summer Annual Governor's Meeting, it was announced that the Wild would relocate to the Vaughan Ice Plex in Vaughan, Ontario, after two seasons in Nobleton and two previous in King City.

In the summer of 2011, the Vaughan Wild moved to Lefroy, Ontario, and became the Lefroy Wave. In the spring of 2014, the Wave moved to Markdale, Ontario, and became the Grey Highlands Bravehearts. The Bravehearts were the first junior team to be based Markdale since the Junior D Markdale Mohawks played their final season in 1984–85.

After two seasons in Markdale, the Bravehearts moved again to Wiarton, Ontario, for the 2016–17 season where they became the Wiarton Rock. However, the team lasted less than one season in Wiarton and folded on December 14, 2016, after difficulty icing a full team and earning a 1-24-1 record.

On March 20, 2017, the GMHL announced that Wiarton would get another team named the Wiarton Schooners for the 2017–18 season. The new team was primarily owned by John and Beth Dyer, a couple who had formerly been trainers and a billet family for the Rock, and 10% stake by another unannounced owner. After the original announcement by the league, it was indicated the Schooners were an expansion team replacing the Rock and not a direct continuation of the defunct team. However, the Schooners only lasted eight winless games, the last a 25–1 loss to the Knights of Meaford, before also folding.

King goalie with GMHL Official (2007)

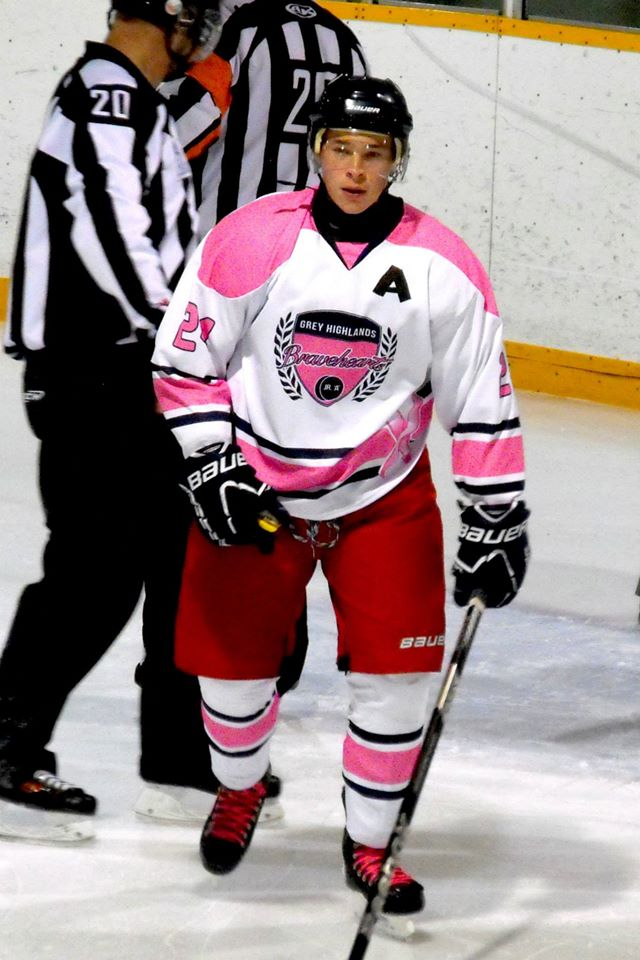
Bravehearts player on Breast Cancer Awareness night during 2014–15 season.

== Season-by-season records ==
Season	GP	W	L	T	OTL	GF	GA	Pts	Regular season finish	Playoffs
King Wild
2006–07	42	26	13	—	3	190	152	55	2nd GMHL	Won quarter-finals, 4–1 (Canada Moose); Won semi-finals, 4–2 (Rams); Lost finals, 1–4 (Rattlers)
2007–08	42	20	20	—	2	186	179	42	8th GMHL	Won Bye Round, 4–0 (Dukes); Lost quarter-finals, 2–4 (Royals)
2008–09	43	26	15	—	2	241	200	54	7th GMHL	Lost quarter-finals, 0–3 (Storm)
2009–10	42	18	20	—	4	212	205	40	7th GMHL	Lost quarter-finals, 0–3 (Shield)
Vaughan Wild
2010–11	42	13	24	—	5	173	215	31	11th GMHL	Lost Last-minute Qualifier game, 1–9 (Canada Moose)
Lefroy Wave
2011–12	42	23	18	—	1	179	186	47	6th GMHL	Won Bye Round, 2–0 (Red Wings); Lost quarter-finals, 2–3 (Rattlers)
2012–13	42	4	35	1	2	110	252	11	15th GMHL	Lost div. quarter-finals, 0–3 (Rattlers)
2013–14	42	5	34	—	3	121	274	13	19th GMHL	Lost Qualifier game, 3–5 (Predators)
Grey Highlands Bravehearts
2014–15	42	18	21	—	3	202	245	39	3rd North-Central Div. 12th GMHL	Lost Divisional Round, 2–3 (Aces)
2015–16	42	18	22	0	2	217	256	38	7th Central Div. 20th GMHL	Lost div. quarter-finals, 0–3 (Coyotes)
Wiarton Rock
2016–17	26	1	24	—	1	69	243	3	Folded mid-season	
