= Temiscaming Titans =

Témiscaming Titans Titans de Témiscaming
- City: Témiscaming, Quebec
- League: Greater Metro Junior A Hockey League
- Division: North
- Founded: 2011
- Home arena: Le Centre de Témiscaming
- Colours: Blue, white, black
- General manager: Tim Toffolo
- Head coach: Tim Toffolo
- Captain: Vacant
- Media: English; TVCTK; French; CKVM-FM
- Website: www.titansjrahockey.ca

The Témiscaming Titans (French: Les Titans de Témiscaming) are a junior ice hockey team based in Témiscaming, Quebec, Canada. They are members of the North Division of the Greater Metro Junior A Hockey League (GMHL). The Titans play their home games at the 750 seat (900 capacity) Le Centre de Témiscaming.

The team has had success, winning two division titles, won the regular season championship twice, appeared in the Russell Cup Finals four times, and won the Russell Cup in 2015 and 2022. The success has been reflected in attendance and has been one of the top teams in attendance in the GMHL.

== History ==
The Temiscaming Titans were officially announced April 12, 2011. The Titans are one of two Quebec-based teams in the GMHL, as well as the third in their history after the Temiscaming Royals (2007–2008) and the Ville-Marie Dragons (2008–2009).

The Temiscaming Titans played their first game on September 10, 2011, in Temiscaming, Quebec, against the Sturgeon Falls Lumberjacks. The Titans defeated the Lumberjacks 7–4 for their first ever win. On October 20, 2011, Aaron Boyce recorded a 23 save shutout against the Elliot Lake Bobcats, the Titans first shutout in franchise history. The Titans were undefeated in regulation through their first twenty games of the season. Their first loss came on November 25, 2011, 8–1, at the hands of the Elliot Lake Bobcats, largely in part to the Bobcats great defensive skills, and Pavlo Borko and his 19 save shutout performance.

In the 2012 GMHL playoffs, the Temiscaming Titans made it to the GMHL Russell Cup Finals against the Sturgeon Falls Lumberjacks. Games one and two were held in Temiscaming which drew crowds of over 500 per game. Game 5 went back to Temiscaming where it drew a crowd of over 700 people. The Titans would fall to the Lumberjacks in 6 games.

As the 2012–13 season began, opening night on September 7, 2012, drew a crowd of over 550 and the Titans won 8–1 against the Shelburne Red Wings. During the course of the season, the Titans posted a 14-game win streak and a 35–6–0–1 overall record during the regular season. The team finished in first place in the North Division, drawing a first round playoff match-up against the Mattawa Voyageurs. Temiscaming swept the Voyageurs, outscoring them 33–8. In the second round, the Titans faced the rival Powassan Eagles. Game one was held in Temiscaming where 234 penalty minutes was given with the teams combined and the Titans winning 7–1. They would go on to sweep the Eagles in three games, pushing their playoff record to 6–0. In three games, the teams combined for 329 penalty minutes. There were 17 game misconducts, 10 fighting majors, and 14 major penalties. They then faced the Bracebridge Phantoms in the North Division Finals. The Titans took games one and two with a 6–5 and 7–4 win. However, going to Bracebridge for games three and four, the Phantoms took home ice as an advantage and won two straight to tie the series. In game five, the Titans won 8–2, but The Phantoms beat the Titans 5–3 in game six. In the decisive game seven in Temiscaming, the Titans cruised to a 9–1 victory to secure a berth in the Russell Cup Finals.

The 2013 Russell Cup Finals included the Titans and the undefeated Bradford Rattlers. Game one was on March 21, 2013, in Bradford, the Titans were trailed most of the game until scoring three goals in the last ten minutes of regulation to force overtime. In overtime, the Titans were shorthanded when Ryan Adams intercepted a pass at his own blue line and went on a breakaway to beat Rattlers' netminder Jonathan LoParco giving the Titans a 1–0 series lead and they were the first team to beat the Rattlers (52–0–0–0) through the regular season and playoffs. Bradford would win games two and three, with Temiscaming taking game four to tie the series 2–2. Ultimately, Temiscaming lost the series in six games.

The Titans started off the 2014–15 season with a 6–1–0 record in their first seven games and 16–6–0 over the next 22, resulting in a 22–7–0 record overall after the first 29 games. During the course of the year, then head coach Robert Miller was let go by the Titans. This resulted in assistant coaches Brandon Blanche and Chris Levesque acting as joint head coaches behind the bench. It was then announced that Tyler Fines, formerly coach of the Orangeville Americans, would be the new head coach of the Titans. The Titans would go 13–0–0 under Fines to finish out the regular season with a 35–5–1 record. The Titans clinched first place in the North Division.

The Titans started the 2015 Russell Cup playoffs by sweeping the rival Sturgeon Falls Lumberjacks in three games and the Titans advanced to the Conference Semi-finals for the fourth straight year. They defeated the Rama Aces in three games to advance to the League Semi-finals against the underdog Halton Ravens. The Titans took the first two games in Temiscaming before the Ravens won one game at home. Halton would stay alive once again with shootout victories in games five and six. Game seven was held in Temiscaming and the Titans would win the game 6–3 and secure a berth to the Russell Cup Finals for the third time in four years.

Temiscaming faced the Seguin Huskies in the 2015 Russell Cup Finals. Game one was held in Seguin the night after the Titans played game seven of the previous series. The Titans would get edged in overtime by the score of 1–0. Game two was held the very next night with the Titans playing three games in three nights. This game would go to a shootout in which the Titans three shooters all scored while Titans' goaltender Craig Wood stopped the third Huskies' shooter to tie the series at 1–1. Game three of the Finals took place in Temiscaming, where the home team won 4–2 to take a 2–1 series lead. Game four of the Finals in Temiscaming drew a crowd of over 600 and with 33 seconds left in the third period, Curtis Warren scored to give the Titans a 3–2 lead. Craig Wood was then tested on a penalty shot with 15 seconds left. He made the stop and the Titans won 5–4 and taking a 3–1 series lead. Game five at Temiscaming drew a crowd close to 1000 and the Titans won 3–2 to win the Russell Cup for the first time.

Due to the COVID-19 pandemic, the GMHL's 2019-2020 season was cut short in the Division Finals. The Titans were coming off a superb year that saw them finish in 2nd place out of 23 teams including finishing 1st in the North Division. They were leading the Bradford Rattlers 3-1 in the best-of-7 series when the GMHL season was officially cancelled. The pandemic continued to affect the league as well as the world when it came to the new season in October, 2020 as the North and South Division in the GMHL was canceled for the 2020-21 season.

On August 7, 2024, Team President & Owner Pascal Labranche announced that the Titans would take a leave of absence for the 2024-25 season. This absence is due to the fact that he was unable to reach a partnership agreement with a local group as well as restructuring the organization before the desired deadline. Due to the same reasons, the Titans also missed the entire 2025-26 season.

On November 21, 2025, a press announcement was made. Notable guests in attendance were Alain Gauthier (Mayor of Témiscaming), Norman Young (Mayor of Kipawa), Martha Polson (Director General of Wolf Lake First Nation), Tina Chevrier (Councillor of Kebaowek First Nation) as well as Ken Girard (GMHL Commissioner). Pascal Labranche has officially sold the Titans to a local group of 6 members. Including Tim Toffolo (President & General Manager), Denis Lacourse (Vice President & Director of Hockey Operations), John Presseault, Bob MacLeod, Roger Mitchell and Claude Desrochers. It was also confirmed that Goaltender Coach Craig Wood would be returning as well as Off-Ice Conditioning Coach & Athletic Trainer Joanie Morin for her 14th season. The Titans will rejoin the active list in the GMHL for the 2026-27 season.

== Season-by-season standings ==
| Russell Cup Champions | Season Champions | Division champions |

Note: GP = Games played, W = Wins, L = Losses, T = Ties, OTL = Overtime Losses, Pts = Points, GF = Goals For, GA = Goals Against.

| Season | GP | W | L | T | OTL | GF | GA | Pts | Regular season finish | Playoffs |
|---|---|---|---|---|---|---|---|---|---|---|
| 2011–12 | 42 | 38 | 3 | — | 1 | 273 | 120 | 77 | 1st GMHL | Won Quarter-finals, 3–0 (Americans); Won Semi-finals, 4–0 (Shield); Lost Russell Cup Finals, 2–4 (Lumberjacks) |
| 2012–13 | 42 | 35 | 6 | 0 | 1 | 315 | 156 | 71 | 2nd GMHL | Won Div. Quarter-finals, 3–0 (Voyageurs); Won Div. Semi-finals, 3–0 (Eagles); Won Div. Finals, 4–3 (Phantoms); Lost Russell Cup Finals, 2–4 (Rattlers) |
| 2013–14 | 42 | 34 | 5 | — | 3 | 298 | 119 | 71 | 2nd GMHL | Won Div. Quarter-finals, 3–0 (Eagles); Won Div. Semi-finals, 3–2 (Shield); Lost Crossover Semi-finals, 0–4 (Bulls) |
| 2014–15 | 42 | 36 | 5 | — | 1 | 283 | 105 | 73 | 1st North Div. 2nd GMHL | Won Div. Quarter-finals, 3–0 (Lumberjacks); Won Conf. Semi-finals, 3–0 (Aces); Won Semi-finals, 4–3 (Ravens); Won Russell Cup Finals, 4–1 (Huskies) |
| 2015–16 | 42 | 34 | 6 | 0 | 2 | 330 | 107 | 70 | 2nd North Div. 5th GMHL | Won Div. Quarter-finals, 3–0 (Wolves); Lost Div. Semi-finals, 1–3 (Spartans) |
| 2016–17 | 42 | 27 | 15 | — | 0 | 221 | 163 | 54 | 5th North Div. 10th GMHL | Won Div. Quarter-finals, 3–1 (Rattlers); Lost Div. Semi-finals, 1–3 (Civics) |
| 2017–18 | 42 | 29 | 12 | — | 1 | 247 | 163 | 59 | 4th North Div. 8th GMHL | Won Div. Quarter-finals, 2–0 (Knights); Lost Div. Semi-finals, 0–3 (Spartans) |
| 2018–19 | 42 | 27 | 12 | — | 3 | 228 | 155 | 57 | 3rd North Div. 6th GMHL | Lost Div. Quarter-finals, 1–2 (Lynx) |
| 2019–20 | 42 | 33 | 8 | — | 1 | 298 | 193 | 67 | 1st North Div. 2nd GMHL | Won Div. Quarter-finals, 2–0 (Lynx); Won Div. Semi-finals, 3–0 (Spartans); Led Div. Finals, 3–1 (Rattlers); Postseason cancelled due to COVID-19. |
| 2020–21 | Season lost due to COVID-19 pandemic | | | | | | | | | |
| 2021–22 | 38 | 36 | 2 | — | 0 | 253 | 97 | 72 | 1st North Div. 1st GMHL | Won Div. Quarter-finals, 2–0 (Civics); Won Div. Semi-finals, 3–0 (Pirates); Won Div. Finals, 4-0 (Bulls); Won Russell Cup Finals, 4-0 (Roadrunners) |
| 2022–23 | 42 | 20 | 20 | — | 2 | 179 | 175 | 42 | 4th North Div. 11th GMHL | Won Div. Quarter-finals, 2–0 (Lynx); Lost Div. Semi-finals, 0-3 (Rattlers) |
| 2023-24 | 42 | 23 | 18 | — | 1 | 218 | 156 | 47 | 5th North Div. 7th GMHL | Won Div. Quarter-finals, 2–1 (Knights); Lost Div. Semi-finals, 0-3 (Rattlers) |
| 2024–25; 2025–26 | Season lost due to leave of absence | | | | | | | | | |
| Totals | 500 | 372 | 112 | 0 | 16 | 3143 | 1709 | 760 | — | All-time series record 22–9 |

== National Championship ==
National Championship (GMHL Northern, Southern and Western Division)

| Year | Preliminary Round | Record | Standing | Bronze Medal Game | Russell Cup Game |
| 2023 | Won, 9-3 (Red Wings); Lost, 3-5 (Rattlers); Won, 4-0 (Renegades) | 2-1-0 | 2nd of 4 | N/A | Lost, 0-7 (Rattlers) |

== Players and personnel ==
=== Current roster ===
Updated November 14, 2020.

| No. | Nat | Player | Pos | S/G | Age | Acquired | Birthplace |
|---|---|---|---|---|---|---|---|
| 22 | (Canada) | Alec Baldwin | F | L | 22–23 | 2020 | North Bay, Ontario |
| 60 | (Canada) | Tyson Beaudoin | G | R | 23 | 2020 | Notre-Dame-du-Mont-Carmel, Quebec |
| 31 | (Canada) | Éloi Bouchard | G | R | 25 | 2019 | Sherbrooke, Quebec |
| 9 | (Canada) | Jérémy Brooks | D | R | 26 | 2019 | Bromont, Quebec |
| 13 | (Canada) | Pier-Luc Céré | F | L | 25 | 2020 | Gatineau, Quebec |
| 64 | (Canada) | Bailey Chenier | F | R | 25 | 2018 | Témiscaming, Quebec |
| 91 | (Canada) | Maxime Durocher | F | R | 27 | 2019 | Marieville, Quebec |
| 12 | (Canada) | William Godbout | D | L | 25 | 2019 | Boischatel, Quebec |
| 30 | (Canada) | Sheydon Kosie | G | R | 21–22 | 2020 | Port Colborne, Ontario |
| 62 | (Canada) | Thomas Laforge | F | L | 25 | 2019 | Boischatel, Quebec |
| 3 | (Canada) | Landon Langlois | F | L | 23 | 2019 | Témiscaming, Quebec |
| 24 | (Canada) | Louis-Thomas Lapointe | D | R | 25 | 2019 | Boischatel, Quebec |
| 77 | (Canada) | Cedrick Lefebvre | F | L | 24 | 2020 | Témiscaming, Quebec |
| 66 | (Canada) | Jérémie Letellier | F | R | 24 | 2020 | Québec City, Quebec |
| 58 | (Canada) | Jericho Mongrain | D | L | 25 | 2020 | Saint-Colomban, Quebec |
| 17 | (Canada) | Cameron Pariseau | F | R | 24 | 2020 | Kebaowek, Quebec |
| 93 | (Canada) | Austin Presseault | D | L | 22 | 2020 | Témiscaming, Quebec |
| 19 | (Canada) | Alexandre Provost-Ross (C) | F | L | 27 | 2017 | Huberdeau, Quebec |
| 44 | (Canada) | Xavier Sincennes | F | L | 25 | 2019 | Gatineau, Quebec |

=== Team captains ===
| | Nat | From | To |
|---|---|---|---|
| Robin Mendelsohn | (Canada) | 2011 | 2012 |
| Richard Abbott | (Canada) | 2012 | 2014 |
| Ryder Murray | (Canada) | 2014 | 2017 |
| Guillaume Taupier | (Canada) | 2017 | 2018 |
| Dayton Murray | (Canada) | 2018 | 2019 |
| Alexandre Provost-Ross | (Canada) | 2019 | 2021 |
| William Godbout | (Canada) | 2021 | 2022 |
| Éloi Bouchard | (Canada) | 2022 | 2023 |
| Émile Lavallée & Nathan Hardy | (Canada) | 2023 | 2024 |
| Foster Marsh | (United States) | 2026 | 2026 |

=== Head coaches ===
| | Nat | From | To | Regular Season | | | | Playoffs | | |
| | Nat | From | To | G | W | L | OTL | G | W | L |
|---|---|---|---|---|---|---|---|---|---|---|
| Nathan Hewitt | (Canada) | 2011 | 2012 | 42 | 38 | 3 | 1 | 13 | 9 | 4 |
| Andre Laperriere | (Canada) | 2012 | 2014 | 84 | 69 | 11 | 4 | 31 | 18 | 13 |
| Robert Miller | (Canada) | 2014 | 2014 | 9 | 7 | 1 | 1 | — | — | — |
| Brandon Blanche and Chris Levesque (Associate coaches) | (Canada) | 2014 | 2015 | 20 | 16 | 4 | 0 | — | — | — |
| Tyler Fines | (Canada) | 2015 | 2015 | 13 | 13 | 0 | 0 | 18 | 14 | 4 |
| Andre Laperriere and Chris Levesque (Associate coaches) | (Canada) | 2015 | 2016 | 42 | 34 | 6 | 2 | 7 | 4 | 3 |
| Chris Levesque | (Canada) | 2016 | 2017 | 42 | 27 | 15 | 0 | 8 | 4 | 4 |
| William Bendi | (Canada) | 2017 | 2018 | 33 | 24 | 9 | 0 | — | — | — |
| Justin Roy | (Canada) | 2018 | 2019 | 51 | 32 | 15 | 4 | 8 | 3 | 5 |
| Sébastien Lacroix | (Canada) | 2019 | 2024 | 168 | 112 | 38 | 4 | 33 | 25 | 8 |
| Thomas Laforge | (Canada) | 2026 | 2026 | 14 | 0 | 14 | 0 | — | — | — |

=== General managers ===
| | Nat | From | To |
|---|---|---|---|
| Vincent Labranche | (Canada) | 2011 | 2015 |
| Nicolas Tourigny | (Canada) | 2015 | 2019 |
| François Harrison | (Canada) | 2019 | 2024 |
| Tim Toffolo | (Canada) | 2026 | Present |

=== Honoured members ===
Temiscaming Titans retired numbers
| No. | Player | Position | Career | No. retirement |
|---|---|---|---|---|
| 2 | Richard Abbott | F | 2011-2014 | February 16, 2014 |
| 7 | Ryder Murray | F | 2012-2017 | February 10, 2017 |
| 20 | Dayton Murray | D | 2013-2019 | February 16, 2019 |
| 31 | Éloi Bouchard | G | 2019-2023 | September 19, 2023 |
| 71 | Chris Levesque | D | 2011-2014 | February 16, 2014 |
| 88 | Andre Leclair | F | 2011-2012 | February 16, 2012 |
| 89 | Robin Mendelsohn | F | 2011-2012 | February 16, 2012 |
