= Greater Metro Junior A Hockey League =

Canadian developmental junior ice hockey league

- Regions: Greater Toronto Area, Midwestern Ontario, Golden Horseshoe, Central Ontario, Northeastern Ontario, Eastern Ontario and Quebec
- President: Bob Russell
- Commissioner: Ken Girard
- Founded: 2006; 20 years ago
- No. of teams: 17
- Recent champions: Northumberland Stars (2026)
- Most successful club: Bradford Rattlers (6)
- Headquarters: Bradford West Gwillimbury, Ontario
- Website: GMHL.net

The Greater Metro Junior A Hockey League (GMHL) is a Canadian developmental junior ice hockey league. The league has primarily had teams in the Greater Toronto Area, Central Ontario, Northeastern Ontario, and Quebec.

As of December 2019, the league's alumni page lists 889 players from 2006 to 2019 who graduated from the GMHL to play for NCAA colleges, various professional leagues, major junior teams, or represented their country in various IIHF World Championships.

The GMHL is an independent junior league and is not a member of the Canadian Junior Hockey League or sanctioned by Hockey Canada.

== History ==
The league, founded by Bob Russell and Hockeyworks International Ltd., opened its doors in early 2006, with a unique concept and approach to improving the standard of developing young hockey players within a Junior 'A' league format setting. A draft showcase event took place from May 5 until May 7, 2006 with players from Canada, United States, and Europe taking up residence at the Hockeyworks' World Hockey Centre near Shelburne, Ontario to take part in the league's first tryout camp.

Deseronto Thunder versus King Wild (circa 2006)

As of September 2006, it became clear that the league would operate its first season with seven teams. The original seven were the Bradford Rattlers, Deseronto Thunder, King Wild, Nipissing Alouettes, Richmond Hill Rams, South Muskoka Shield, and Toronto Canada Moose.

The league's first ever game took place on September 8, 2006 between the King Wild and the Richmond Hill Rams. The final result was a 6–0 victory for the Rams, despite being badly outshot by the Wild. The first goal in the league's history was scored by the Rams' Darren Archibald (future Vancouver Canucks prospect) on the power play during the first period. Rams' goaltender Daniel Jones picked up the historical first victory, as well as the league's first shutout in history.

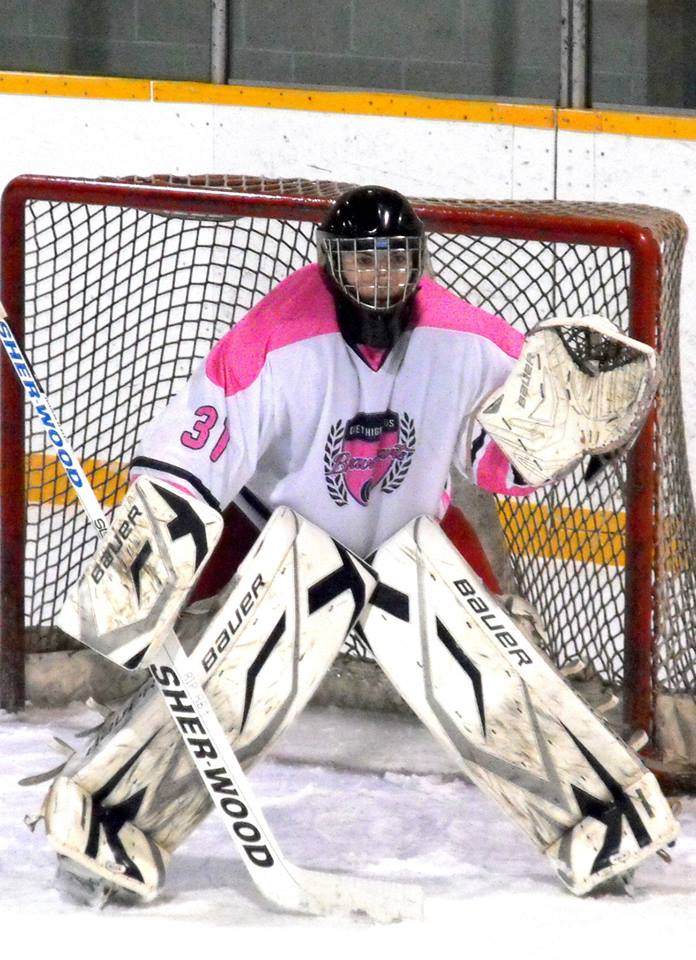
Grey Highlands Bravehearts goalie during 2014–15 season.

On November 15, 2006, the GMJHL announced its affiliation with the World Hockey Association and creation of the National Junior Hockey Alliance. The affiliation resulted in a national championship between the GMJHL playoff champion and the winner of the WHA Junior West Hockey League after the 2006–07 season.

The first ever regular season of the GMJHL concluded on February 25, 2007 with the Bradford Rattlers leading the way as regular season champs with a record of 37 wins, 1 regulation loss, and 4 overtime losses. In the playoffs, the Rattlers beat the Deseronto Thunder in six games, and then the King Wild in five games to win the first ever Russell Cup as playoff champions.

In September 2007, the GMJHL started its second season with six new teams, the Douro Dukes, Elliot Lake Bobcats, Espanola Kings, Innisfil Lakers, Tamworth Cyclones, and Temiscaming Royals. The Deseronto Thunder ran into financial trouble after their first season and ownership of the team was transferred to the town. The team is now known as the Deseronto Storm.

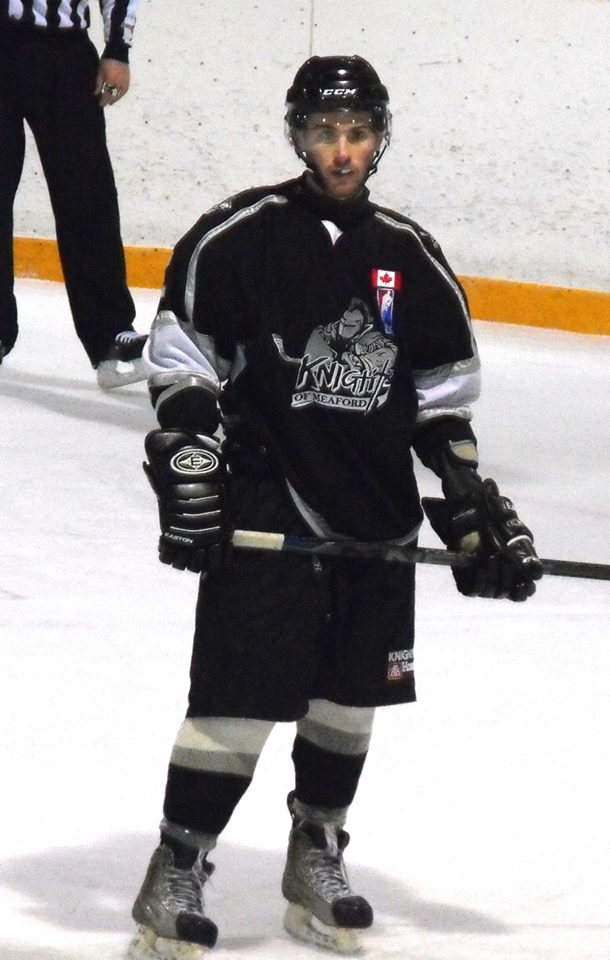
Knights of Meaford player during 2014–15 season.

On December 11, 2007, the GMJHL announced a seven-game challenge series versus a Russian team known as the Moscow Selects. In late December and early January, the top seven teams of the GMJHL will compete against the Moscow Selects—a mixture of top Top Junior talent from the City of Moscow. The Selects played seven games, against Bradford, Innisfil, Temiscaming, Elliot Lake, Richmond Hill, Deseronto, and South Muskoka, winning each game. In March 2008, the King Wild and Richmond Hill Rams played two games each against the Mexico national ice hockey team. The Wild won both their games, while the Rams lost both of theirs.

For the 2008–09 season, the GMJHL adopted much of the National Collegiate Athletic Association's ice hockey rulebook. The GMJHL added the Minden Riverkings and the Oro-Medonte 77's to the mix, and the Dukes relocated to become the Brock Bucks. At the same time, the Quebec-based Temiscaming Royals walked away from the league to join the Northern Ontario Junior Hockey League, but were replaced within weeks by the Ville-Marie Dragons.

In December 2008 and January 2009, eight teams of the GMHL hosted Kazakhstan's Under-18 Torpedo UST-Kamenogorsk squad. Victorious were the Elliot Lake Bobcats (twice), South Muskoka Shield, King Wild, Bradford Rattlers, Innisfil Lakers, and a Nipissing/Ville-Marie combined squad. The only loss for a GMHL team happened to the Toronto Canada Moose.

In the summer of 2010, the GMHL expanded in two fashions internationally. First, Canada's only All-Russian team in the Shelburne Red Wings and then late in the summer they expanded to the United States through the expansion of the Jamestown Jets.

On September 17, 2010, the GMHL played its first international regulation game, in Jamestown, New York between the Jamestown Jets and Sturgeon Falls Lumberjacks, both expansion teams to the league for the 2010–11 season. Jamestown won the game 4–3. In December 2010, the GMHL named Bob Bernstein commissioner. After serving as commissioner for seven days, Bernstein was relieved of his duties and Ken Girard later resumed as full-time commissioner.

In mid-January 2011, it was announced that the town of Iron Bridge, Ontario and its 500-seat outdoor arena would host a regular season game, known as the North Shore Winter Classic, between the Elliot Lake Bobcats and Algoma Avalanche on January 29, 2011. This is the first known regulation outdoor game in Ontario in the modern era. Elliot Lake would win the game 8–2 in front of an estimated 400 fans.

At the conclusion of the 2011–12 season, the league lost the Elliot Lake Bobcats to the Northern Ontario Junior Hockey League. Relocation of teams and expansion was busier than ever in 2014. The Mattawa Voyageurs moved to Sundridge to make way for an NOJHL team. The Powassan Eagles moved to Parry Sound to make way for an NOJHL team. The league expanded rapidly with a total of 15 new teams in the off-season of 2014 and 2015. There was a total of 30 teams, with a total of six teams playing in the same market (two teams per town).

The Shelburne Red Wings were sold after the 2013–14 season, and were renamed the Shelburne Stars. However, the Stars did not play in 2014–15 and changed their name to the Shelburne Sharks and began play in 2015–16. In May 2015, the Rama Aces took a leave of absence but never returned. In November 2015, the Brantford Steelfighters suspended their operations after 18 games.

The Shelburne Sharks returned as the Shelburne Stars in June 2016, but the team folded soon afterwards. The Sturgeon Falls Lumberjacks re-branded as the West Nipissing Lynx, but remained in Sturgeon Falls. Early into the 2016–17 season, the Toronto Blue Ice Jets were removed from the schedule in the first week, the Bracebridge Blues in the fifth week, the Komoka Dragons in the seventh week, the Lincoln Mavericks in the twelfth week, and Wiarton Rock in the fifteenth week of the season. The Orangeville Ice Crushers would also suspend operations in January 2017 and all remaining games against Orangeville were considered forfeits.

For 2017–18, the league added the Fergus Force, Ville-Marie Pirates, Wiarton Schooners, and Windsor Aces while losing the Toronto Attack. In late August 2017, the Parry Sound Islanders announced they were taking a leave of absence and merged with the Seguin Huskies. The Force and Schooners both folded during the season without winning a game.

After one season following the Islanders merge, the Seguin Huskies folded in 2018. The GMHL also added two teams originally in the Canadian Premier Junior Hockey League in the Niagara-on-the-Lake Nationals and Ottawa Sharpshooters for 2018–19. The Wiarton Schooners returned but folded midseason for the second consecutive season, and third consecutive midseason GMHL team folding in the town of Wiarton.

In 2019, the league added the Western Provinces Hockey Association (WPHA) as a Western Division in the GMHL for the 2019–20 season, which then rebranded as the GMHL West. The WPHA had played the previous season in the Western States Hockey League as the Provinces Division. The 2020 playoffs were then curtailed by the onset of the COVID-19 pandemic and no champion was named. The following 2020–21 season did not take place as scheduled due to pandemic restrictions in Ontario and Quebec, with six teams playing only two games each in December 2020. The four teams in the GMHL West were able to play a partial season and a playoff in May 2021. In 2023, all teams from the GMHL West were removed by the league, which then formed their own league called the National Junior Hockey League (NJHL).

== Teams ==
=== 2026–27 teams ===
Division	Team	Joined	Location	Arena
North	Almaguin Spartans	2011	South River, Ontario	Sundridge Strong Joly Arena
North	Bradford Rattlers	2006	Bradford West Gwillimbury, Ontario	BWG Leisure Centre
North	Meaford Knights	2013	Meaford, Ontario	Meaford & St. Vincent Community Centre
North	Temiscaming Titans	2014	Temiscaming, Quebec	Le Centre
North	Tottenham Railers	2014	New Tecumseth, Ontario	Tottenham and Community Fitness Centre
North	Wasaga River Dragons	2024	Wasaga Beach, Ontario	Wasaga Stars Arena
North	Ville-Marie Pirates	2017	Ville-Marie, Quebec	Olympia de Ville-Marie Arena
North	West Nipissing Lynx	2010	West Nipissing, Ontario	Sturgeon Falls Arena
South	Bradford Bulls	2012	Bradford West Gwillimbury, Ontario	Bob Fallis Sports Centre
South	Brighton Vikings	2026	Brighton, Ontario	King Edward Park Arena
South	Durham Roadrunners	2015	Oshawa, Ontario	Delpark Homes Arena
South	Niagara Predators	2013	Niagara-on-the-Lake, Ontario	Meridian Credit Union Arena
South	Orangeville Blitz	2026	-	Alder Street Recreation Facility
South	Northumberland Stars	2015	Cramahe, Ontario	Keeler Center
South	Richmond Hill Rampage	2024	Richmond Hill, Ontario	Elvis Stojko Arena
South	St. George Ravens	2013	Brant, Ontario	South Dumfries Community Centre
South	Toronto Flyers	2021	Vaughan, Ontario	Paramount Ice Arena

=== 2027–28 changes ===
- Almaguin announce new ownership. Returning the 2026-27 season
- Temiscaming Titans - Returning the 2026-27 season
- Niagara Predators - taking leave of absence
- Brighton Vikings - expansion franchise
- Orangeville Blitz - expansion franchise

== Regular season champions ==
Bolded are overall regular season champions.

Season	Champion	W–L–T–OTL	Pts
2006–07	**Bradford Rattlers**	37–1–0–4	**78**
2007–08	**Bradford Rattlers**	37–4–0–1	**75**

Season	North Champion	W–L–T–OTL	Pts	South Champion	W–L–T–OTL	Pts
2008–09	**South Muskoka Shield**	38–4–0–1	**77**	Innisfil Lakers	36–6–0–1	**73**

Season	Champion	W–L–T–OTL	Pts
2009–10	**Elliot Lake Bobcats**	35–4–0–3	**73**

Season	North Champion	W–L–T–OTL	Pts	South Champion	W–L–T–OTL	Pts
2010–11	**Elliot Lake Bobcats**	38–2–0–2	**78**	Jamestown Jets	27–12–0–3	**57**

Season	Champion	W–L–T–OTL	Pts
2011–12	**Temiscaming Titans**	38–3–0–1	**77**

Season	North Champion	W–L–T–OTL	Pts	South Champion	W–L–T–OTL	Pts
2012–13	Temiscaming Titans	35–6–0–1	**71**	**Bradford Rattlers**	42–0–0–0	**84**
2013–14	**Seguin Huskies**	39–1–0–2	**80**	Bradford Bulls	32–6–0–4	**68**
2014–15	Temiscaming Titans	36–5–0–1	**73**	**Tottenham Steam**	37–5–0–0	**74**

Season	North Champion	Pts	Central Champion	Pts	South Champion	Pts
2015–16	South Muskoka Shield	**73**	**Tottenham Steam**	**82**	Kingsville Kings	**78**

Season	North Champion	W–L–OTL	Pts	South Champion	W–L–OTL	Pts
2016–17	New Tecumseth Civics	37–5–0	**74**	**Niagara Whalers**	38–3–1	**77**
2017–18	Almaguin Spartans	31–11–0	**62**	**St. George Ravens**	38–3–1	**77**
2018–19	Bradford Rattlers	35–6–1	**71**	**St. George Ravens**	39–3–0	**78**

Season	North Champion	Pts	South Champion	Pts	West Champion	Pts
2019–20	Temiscaming Titans	**67**	**St. George Ravens**	**68**	Slave Lake Icedogs	**54**
2020–21	Did not play due to the COVID-19 pandemic				**High Prairie Red Wings**	**36**
2021–22	Temiscaming Titans	**72**	Durham Roadrunners	**68**	**High Prairie Red Wings**	**80**
2022–23	Bradford Rattlers	**78**	North York Renegades	**72**	**High Prairie Red Wings**	**78**

Season	North Champion	W–L–OTL	Pts	South Champion	W–L–OTL	Pts
2023–24	**Bradford Rattlers**	38–3–1	**77**	North York Renegades	35–5–2	72
2024–25	**Bradford Rattlers**	37–3–2	**76**	Northumberland Stars	31–9–2	64

== Russell Cup playoff champions ==
Bolded are overall champions, Italics are finalist.

Year	Champion	Finalist	Series	Scores
2007	Bradford Rattlers	King Wild	4–1	**2–1**, 3–6, **5–0**, **2–1** OT, **4–3** OT
2008	Bradford Rattlers	Innisfil Lakers	4–0	**4–2**, **8–4**, **10–3**, **5–3**
2009	South Muskoka Shield	Deseronto Storm	4–2	**7–3**, **3–2**, **4–3**, 6–7, 1–2, **4–2**
2010	Deseronto Storm	South Muskoka Shield	4–3	**4–2**, **5–2**, 3–4, 3–4 OT, 2–3, **5–3**, **4–2**
2011	Elliot Lake Bobcats	South Muskoka Shield	4–3	1–3, **5–2**, 4–5 OT, 4–5 OT, **5–2**, **3–2** OT, **8–5**
2012	Sturgeon Falls Lumberjacks	Temiscaming Titans	4–2	**5–3**, **6–4**, 5–6 OT, **5–4**, 3–6, **6–1**
2013	Bradford Rattlers	Temiscaming Titans	4–2	6–7 OT, **6–2**, **6–3**, 2–6, **6–3**, **6–2**
2014	Bradford Bulls	Bradford Rattlers	4–1	**3–2**, **2–1** OT, **5–4**, 2–4, **6–4**
2015	Temiscaming Titans	Seguin Huskies	4–1	0–1 OT, **4–3** OT, **4–2**, **5–4**, **3–2**

Year	North	Central	South	Series	Scores
2016	Almaguin Spartans	**Tottenham Steam**	Kingsville Kings	4–3	**6–5** OT, **3–1**, 2–3, 1–6, **5–4** OT, 3–5, **6–1**

Year	North	South	Series	Scores
2017	Parry Sound Islanders	**Niagara Whalers**	0–4	**1–7**, **0–5**, **1–10**, **1–7**
2018	**Almaguin Spartans**	St. George Ravens	4–2	**5–2**, **3–2**, 1–4, 2–5, **10–3**, **7–3**
2019	**Ville-Marie Pirates**	St. George Ravens	4–0	**5–3**, **3–1**, **6–5**, **8–3**
2020	Cancelled due to the COVID-19 pandemic

Year	North	South	Series	West Champion	West Finalist	Series
2021	Cancelled due to the COVID-19 pandemic			**High Prairie Red Wings**	Slave Lake Icedogs	4-0
2022	**Temiscaming Titans**	Durham Roadrunners	4–0	**High Prairie Red Wings**	Edson Eagles	4-0

**Russell Cup National Championship Tournament**
Year	Champions	Finalist	Score	Other Participants	Host
2023	**Bradford Rattlers** (4-0)	Temiscaming Titans (2-2)	7–0	High Prairie (0-3), North York (1-2)	Temiscaming, Quebec

Year	North	South	Series	Scores
2024	**Bradford Rattlers** (5th)	Bradford Bull	4-1	2-4, **5-1**, **3-1**, **5-3**, **5-4**
2025	**Bradford Rattlers** (6th)	North York Renegades	4-1	2-5, **8-1**, **5-1**, **4-2**, **6-3**

== College Showcase Tournament ==
Since 2009, the GMHL has had a mid-season prospect tournament. Generally, the top seven teams of the league compete in the tournament with an eighth team, the GMHL Selects representing the other teams in the league.

The 2012 tournament featured both the Bradford Rattlers and South Muskoka Shield being thrown out in the semifinal round. An incident, both on-ice and later off-ice, involving a player from each team and later two more players and a parent from one team entering the altercation, resulted in a police investigation and one team refusing to continue. The league disqualified both teams after the game failed to continue.

Since the 2012 tournament, the league changed the format to a prospect weekend with no championship rounds.

Year	Champion	Finalist	Score	Location
2009	Bradford Rattlers	Elliot Lake Bobcats	6–4	Elliot Lake, Ontario
2010	GMHL Selects	Elliot Lake Bobcats	7–6, OT	Elliot Lake, Ontario
2011	Sturgeon Falls Lumberjacks	Elliot Lake Bobcats	4–3, OT	Elliot Lake, Ontario
2012	Bracebridge Phantoms	Toronto Attack	6–3	Rama, Ontario

== Season leaders ==
=== Scoring champions ===
Season	Champion	Team	G–A–Pts
2006–07	Craig Peacock	Richmond Hill Rams	48–34–82
2007–08	Adam Palm	Bradford Rattlers	34–68–102
2008–09	Andre Leclair	Nipissing Alouettes	49–61–110
2009–10	Brad Clark	Deseronto Storm	59–68–127
2010–11	Alexander Nikulnikov	Shelburne Red Wings	69–71–140
2011–12	Andre Leclair	Temiscaming Titans	48–66–122
2012–13	Illes Gallo	Bradford Rattlers	47–61–108
2013–14	Donny Danroth	South Muskoka Shield	45–84–129
2014–15	Ferdinando Colella	Tottenham Steam	40–85–125
2015–16	Matt Fischer	Tottenham Steam	72–74–146
2016–17	Carl Lyden	South Muskoka Shield	55–74–129
2017–18	Chris Haigh	St. George Ravens	48–89–137
2018–19	Bryce Yetman	Windsor Aces	81–72–153
2019–20	Marc-Antoine Turcotte	Temiscaming Titans	49–106–155
2020–21	Mikal Chalifoux	High Prairie Red Wings	45–36–81
2021–22	Kory Silverio	Windsor Aces	68–77–145
2022–23	Ryan Fritz	North York Renegades	51–80–131
2023-24	Christopher Rende	North York Renegades	44-69-113
2024-25	Thomas Johnston	Northumberland Stars	40-77-117

=== Goals against average champions ===
*Min. 11 games, except 2020-21 due to COVID-19 (6 games).

Season	Champion	Team	GAA
2006–07	Andreas Götz	Bradford Rattlers	2.05
2007–08	Martin Oksala	Bradford Rattlers	2.11
2008–09	Shane Buckley	Elliot Lake Bobcats	2.47
2009–10	Rob Sutherland	South Muskoka Shield	1.70
2010–11	Matthew Perry	Elliot Lake Bobcats	3.08
2011–12	Aaron Boyce	Temiscaming Titans	2.42
2012–13	Alfred Metz	Bradford Rattlers	1.84
2013–14	Martin Kysa	Seguin Huskies	2.31
2014–15	Craig Wood	Temiscaming Titans	1.84
2015–16	Wes Werner	Kingsville Kings	1.20
2016–17	T.J. Sherwood	New Tecumseth Civics	1.95
2017–18	Nicklaus Robinson	North York Renegades	2.66
2018–19	Austin Strom	St. George Ravens	2.00
2019–20	Lane Timmons	Niagara Whalers	2.48
2020–21	Aidan Spraggs	High Prairie Red Wings	3.17
2021–22	Keygon Okemow	High Prairie Red Wings	2.02
2022–23	Dawson Holitzki	High Prairie Red Wings	1.64
2023-24	Maxim Ivanov	Bradford Rattlers	1.70
2024-25	Brody Pritchard	Wasaga River Dragons	2.79

== Team records ==
*Records reflect teams playing full 42-game schedule.

- Best record: 2012–13 Bradford Rattlers (42–0–0–0)
- Worst record: 2021–22 Gibbons Pioneers (1–41–0–0)
- Most goals for by team, one season: 2017–18 St. George Ravens (404)
- Fewest goals for by team, one season: 2021–22 Gibbons Pioneers (82)
- Fewest goals against by team, one season: 2015–16 Kingsville Kings (71)
- Most goals against by team, one season: 2015–16 Bobcaygeon Storm (491)
- Largest margin of victory: Elliot Lake Bobcats 29 - Ville-Marie Dragons 1 on December 6, 2008

== Individual records ==
- Most goals, one season: Bryce Yetman (81) — 2018–19 Windsor Aces
- Most assists, one season: Marc-Antoine Turcotte (106) — 2019–20 Temiscaming Titans
- Most points, one season: Marc-Antoine Turcotte (155) — 2019–20 Temiscaming Titans
- Lowest goals against average, one season: Wes Werner (1.20) — 2015–16 Kingsville Kings
- Highest save percentage, one season: Jan Pechek (0.951) — 2015–16 Kingsville Kings

== Former teams ==
Team	Centre	Joined	Exited	Status
Algoma Avalanche	Thessalon, Ontario	2009	2012	folded
Almaguin Spartans	South River, Ontario	2011	2022	Suspended operation prior to the 2022–23 season
Bancroft Rockhounds	Bancroft, Ontario	2019	2023	folded - Suspended operation prior to the 2023–24 season
Bobcaygeon Bucks	Kawartha Lakes, Ontario	2007	2014	Joined CIHL
Bobcaygeon Storm	Kawartha Lakes, Ontario	2015	2016	Membership revoked
Bracebridge Blues	Bracebridge, Ontario	2012	2016	Removed from schedule mid-season
Brantford Steelfighters	Brantford, Ontario	2015		Membership revoked, folded mid-season
Burns Lake Timbermen	Burns Lake, BC	2022	2023	To NJHL but folded
Cambridge Bears	Cambridge, Ontario	2014	2015	Went on hiatus; never returned
Cold Lake Wings	Cold Lake, Alberta	2019	2019	Became Edmonton Academy Wings before season
Coldwater Falcons	Severn, Ontario	2015	2016	Membership revoked
Deseronto Storm	Deseronto, Ontario	2006	2012	Joined EBJCHL
Edmonton Academy Wings	Edmonton, Alberta	2019	2019	Became High Prairie Red Wings during season
Edson Eagles	Edson, Alberta	2021	2023	To NJHL
Elliot Lake Bobcats	Elliot Lake, Ontario	2007	2012	Joined NOJHL
Espanola Kings	Espanola, Ontario	2007	2009	Folded
Fergus Force	Centre Wellington, Ontario	2017		Folded mid-season
Fox Creek Ice Kings	Fox Creek, Alberta	2020	2023	To NJHL
Gibbons Pioneers	Gibbons, Alberta	2021	2023	To NJHL
Grey County Grizzlies	Grey Highlands, Ontario	2015		Folded mid-season
Haliburton Wolves	Dysart et al, Ontario	2015	2016	Membership revoked
High Prairie Red Wings	High Prairie, Alberta	2019	2023	To NJHL
Hinton Wildcats	Hinton, Alberta	2019	2019	Folded before season
Innisfil Lakers	Innisfil, Ontario	2007	2010	Folded
Jamestown Jets	Jamestown, New York	2010	2011	Lost arena, folded
Kingsville Kings	Kingsville, Ontario	2015	2021	Not listed as a member for the 2021–22 season
Kitimat Saax	Kitimat, BC	2022	2023	To NJHL but folded
Komoka Dragons	Middlesex Centre, Ontario	2015	2016	Folded mid-season
Lincoln Mavericks	Lincoln, Ontario	2016	2016	Folded mid-season
Mackenzie Mountaineers	Mackenzie, BC	2021	2023	To NJHL but folded
Minden Riverkings	Minden Hills, Ontario	2008	2009	Folded
New Tecumseth Civics	New Tecumseth, Ontario	2015	2023	Folded
Niagara Whalers	Port Colborne, Ontario	2014	2021	Not listed as a member for the 2021–22 season
Niagara-on-the-Lake Nationals	Niagara-on-the-Lake, Ontario	2018	2019	Folded
Niagara Predators	2021	2026	leave of absence 2026-27
Nipissing Alouettes	West Nipissing, Ontario	2006	2009	Folded
Northern Alberta Tomahawks	Enoch, Alberta	2019	2023	To NJHL but folded
Orangeville Ice Crushers	Orangeville, Ontario	2011	2017	Suspended operations mid-season
Oro-Medonte 77's	Oro-Medonte, Ontario	2008	2011	Folded
Oshawa Riverkings	Oshawa, Ontario	2015	2019	Sold and rebranded as Durham RoadRunners
Ottawa Sharpshooters	Mississippi Mills, Ontario	2018	2019	Folded mid-season in 2019–20
Parry Sound Islanders	Parry Sound, Ontario	2014	2017	formerly Powassan Eagles – merged with Seguin Huskies
Powassan Dragons	Powassan, Ontario	2008	2011	purchased Ville Marie franchise
Plattsville Lakers	Blandford-Blenheim, Ontario	2020	2022	Investigation by league - suspended
Powassan Eagles	Powassan, Ontario	2012	2014	formerly Powassan Dragons franchise – relocated to Parry Sound
Rama Aces	Rama, Ontario	2012	2015	Folded
Richmond Hill Rams	Richmond Hill, Ontario	2006	2009	Folded
Rosetown Red Wings	Rosetown, Saskatchewan	2019	2019	Folded before season
Seguin Huskies	Seguin, Ontario	2013	2018	Folded
Shelburne Stars	Shelburne, Ontario	2010	2016	Folded
Slave Lake Ice Dogs	Slave Lake, Alberta	2019	2023	Left league and folded
South Muskoka Shield	Gravenhurst, Ontario	2006	2023	Suspended from league
Tamworth Cyclones	Stone Mills, Ontario	2007	2009	Folded
Temiscaming Titans	Temiscaming, Quebec	2011	2024	Folded
Temiscaming Royals	Temiscaming, Quebec	2007	2008	Joined NOJHL
Tillsonburg Hurricanes	Tillsonburg, Ontario	2016	2019	Folded
Toronto Attack	Toronto, Ontario	2012	2017	Folded
Toronto Blue Ice Jets	Markham, Ontario	2005	2016	Previously Toronto Canada Moose – folded
Tumbler Ridge Steel Kings	Tumbler Ridge, BC	2022	2022	Folded after 4 games
Vaughan Stars	Vaughan, Ontario	2011		Membership revoked
Ville-Marie Dragons	Ville-Marie, Quebec	2008	2009	folded mid-season – revived as Powassan Dragons
Wiarton Rock	South Bruce Peninsula, Ontario	2006	2016	Folded mid-season
Wiarton Schooners	South Bruce Peninsula, Ontario	2017	2017; 2018	Folded mid-season in both 2017 and 2018
Windsor Aces	Windsor, Ontario	2017	2023	Leave of Absence

== Timeline of teams ==
2006–07

- League is formed with seven teams: Bradford Rattlers, Deseronto Thunder, King Wild, Nipissing Alouettes, Richmond Hill Rams, South Muskoka Shield, Toronto Canada Moose

2007–08

- Deseronto Thunder become Deseronto Storm
- League expands by six teams: Douro Dukes, Elliot Lake Bobcats, Espanola Kings, Innisfil Lakers, Tamworth Cyclones, Temiscaming Royals

2008–09

- Douro Dukes move and become Brock Bucks
- Richmond Hill Rams become Ontario Lightning Rams
- Oro-Medonte 77's join league
- Ville-Marie Dragons join league
- Minden Riverkings join league
- Temiscaming Royals leave league for Northern Ontario Junior Hockey League

2009–10

- Ville-Marie Dragons fold mid-season (January)
- Tamworth Cyclones fold mid-season (January)
- Ontario Lightning Rams leave league
- Espanola Kings leave league
- Nipissing Alouettes leave league
- Algoma Avalanche join league
- Ville-Marie Dragons move and become Powassan Dragons
- Minden Riverkings fold mid-season (November)

2010–11

- Shelburne Red Wings join league
- Sturgeon Falls Lumberjacks join league
- King Wild move and become Vaughan Wild
- Brock Bucks move and become Bobcaygeon Bucks
- Innisfil Lakers leave league
- Jamestown Jets join league from Northern Junior Hockey League (league's first American team)

2011–12

- Mattawa Voyageurs join league
- Temiscaming Titans join league
- Halton Huskies join league
- Orangeville Americans join league
- Vaughan Stars join league
- Vaughan Wild move and become Lefroy Wave
- Powassan Dragons change name to Powassan Eagles
- Oro-Medonte 77's leave league
- Jamestown Jets leave league

2012–13

- Rama Aces join league
- Powassan Eagles return
- Bradford Bulls join league
- Toronto Attack join league
- Bracebridge Phantoms join league
- Elliot Lake Bobcats leave league for Northern Ontario Junior Hockey League
- Deseronto Storm leave league for Empire B Junior C Hockey League
- Algoma Avalanche leave league

2013–14

- Expansion granted to the Alliston Coyotes of Alliston, Ontario.
- Expansion granted to the Seguin Huskies of Seguin, Ontario.
- Expansion granted to the Toronto Predators of Toronto, Ontario.
- Expansion granted to Halton Ravens of Burlington, Ontario.
- Expansion granted to Knights of Meaford of Meaford, Ontario.
- Toronto Canada Moose renamed Toronto Blue Ice Jets.

2014–15

- Expansion granted to the Cambridge Bears of Cambridge, Ontario.
- Lefroy Wave relocate to Markdale, Ontario and become Grey Highlands Bravehearts.
- Expansion granted to the Tottenham Steam of Tottenham, Ontario.
- Bobcaygeon Bucks leave league for CIHL.
- Mattawa Voyageurs relocate to South River, Ontario and become Almaguin Spartans.
- Expansion granted to the North York Renegades of Toronto, Ontario.
- Bracebridge Phantoms change name to Bracebridge Blues.
- Expansion granted to Niagara Whalers of Port Colborne, Ontario.
- Powassan Eagles relocate to Parry Sound, Ontario and become Parry Sound Islanders.
- Shelburne Red Wings are sold; change name to Shelburne Stars and take season off to restructure.

2015–16

- Expansion granted to Bobcaygeon Storm of Bobcaygeon, Ontario.
- Expansion granted to Brantford Steelfighters of Brantford, Ontario.
- Expansion granted to Colborne Chiefs of Colborne, Ontario.
- Expansion granted to Coldwater Falcons of Coldwater, Ontario.
- Expansion granted to Grey County Grizzlies of Feversham, Ontario.
- Expansion granted to Haliburton Wolves of Haliburton, Ontario.
- Expansion granted to Kingsville Kings of Kingsville, Ontario.
- Expansion granted to Komoka Dragons of Komoka, Ontario.
- Expansion granted to London Lakers of London, Ontario.
- Expansion granted to Norfolk Vikings of Simcoe, Ontario.
- Expansion granted to Oshawa Riverkings of Oshawa, Ontario.
- Orangeville Americans were renamed the Orangeville Ice Crushers.
- Shelburne Stars were renamed the Shelburne Sharks.
- Brantford Steelfighters take leave of absence after 18 games played; league revokes membership.
- Grey County Grizzlies cease operations after 23 games played and only one win.
- Sturgeon Falls Lumberjacks end season early due to lack of players.

2016–17

- Grey Highlands Bravehearts relocate to Wiarton, Ontario. The newly named Wiarton Rock would then fold midway through their first season on 14 December.
- Expansion granted to Tillsonburg Hurricanes.
- Bobcaygeon Storm membership revoked
- Coldwater Falcons membership revoked
- Grey County Grizzlies membership revoked
- Haliburton Wolves membership revoked
- Brantford Steelfighters membership revoked.
- Expansion granted to Lincoln Mavericks of Lincoln, Ontario, but withdrew from the league on November 21 during their first season.
- Colbourne Chiefs rebranded as Northumberland Stars after ownership change.
- Alliston Coyotes rebranded as New Tecumseth Civics after ownership change.
- Sturgeon Falls Lumberjacks return to league. Change of ownership and rebranded as the West Nipissing Lynx.
- Shelburne Sharks rebrand as Shelbourne Stars but fold prior to the beginning of the season.
- Norfolk Vikings take 2016–17 hiatus
- Toronto Blue Ice Jets fold just before start of season.
- Bracebridge Blues removed from schedule after playing five games and forfeiting a sixth.
- Komoka Dragons folded after 12 games.
- Orangeville Ice Crushers suspended operations in January. Three of the team's owners had been arrested for drug distribution in November 2016 and were suspended by the league. The league transferred control to another shareholder who ceased operations of the team after two months.

2017–18

- Fergus Force granted membership as an expansion team. Folded after playing 16 games, all loses, with one credited win for a Wiarton forfeit.
- Ville-Marie Pirates granted membership as an expansion team.
- Wiarton Schooners granted membership as an expansion team. Folded after eight winless games and a 25–1 loss to the Knights of Meaford.
- Toronto Attack removed from GMHL's list of teams on website.
- Windsor Aces granted membership as an expansion franchise.
- Parry Sound Islanders cease operations and merged with Seguin Huskies.

2018–19

- Niagara-on-the-Lake Nationals expansion team added from the Canadian Premier Junior Hockey League after the Nationals decided to not participate in the CPJHL.
- Ottawa Sharpshooters joined as expansion team for 2018–19 season from the Canadian Premier Junior Hockey League.
- The Seguin Huskies folded prior to the 2018–19 season.
- Wiarton Schooners returned to league after folding during the previous season. Folded again after 17 games played, and a 1–16 record, in 2018.

2019–20

- Bancroft, Ontario, was granted an expansion franchise with the Bancroft Rockhounds.
- Oshawa Riverkings sold and rebranded as Durham RoadRunners.
- Niagara-on-the-Lake Nationals folded after one season.
- Tillsonburg Hurricanes ceased operations
- Cold Lake Wings of Cold Lake, Alberta coming from the Western States Hockey League granted membership as an expansion team in the West Division.
- Cold Lake Wings of Cold Lake, Alberta lost their lease in a dispute with the City of Cold Lake and became known as the Edmonton Academy Wings but were unable to obtain a satisfactory lease in Edmonton.
- Edmonton Academy Wings of Edmonton, Alberta, former Cold Lake Wings, played as Edmonton Academy Wings umtil November 10, 2019 when they switched names to High Prairie Red Wings and played in High Prairie, Alberta.
- High Prairie Red Wings of High Prairie, Alberta, former Edmonton Academy Wings moved to High Prairie part way through 2019-20 season.
- Hinton Wildcats of Hinton, Alberta coming from the Western States Hockey League granted membership as an expansion team in the West Division.
- Hinton Wildcats of Hinton, Alberta lost their lease in a dispute with the Town of Hinton and folded before the season started.
- Northern Alberta Tomahawks of Enoch, Alberta granted membership as an expansion team in the West Division.
- Rosetown Red Wings of Rosetown, Saskatchewan granted membership as an expansion team in the West Division.
- Rosetown Red Wings of Rosetown, Saskatchewan were announced to move to High Prairie, Alberta but the Alberta Academy Wings seems to have moved there instead but played with Rosetown Red Wing uniforms.
- Slave Lake Icedogs of Slave Lake, Alberta granted membership as an expansion team in the West Division.
- The Ottawa Sharpshooters folded in December 2019.

2020–21

- The London Lakers moved to Plattsville, Ontario, as the Plattsville Lakers.
- The Tottenham Steam rebranded as the Tottenham Thunder.
- Fox Creek Ice Kings of Fox Creek, Alberta granted membership as an expansion team in the West Division.

2021–22

- The Toronto Predators relocated to Niagara-on-the-Lake as the Niagara-on-the-Lake Predators.
- Edson Eagles of Edson, Alberta granted membership as an expansion team in the West Division.
- Gibbons Pioneers of Gibbons, Alberta granted membership as an expansion team in the West Division.
- Mackenzie Mountaineers of Mackenzie, British Columbia granted membership as an expansion team in the West Division.

2022–23

- Burns Lake Timbermen of Burns Lake, British Columbia granted membership as an expansion team in the West Division.
- Kitimat Saax of Kitimat, British Columbia granted membership as an expansion team in the West Division.
- Tumbler Ridge Steel Kings of Tumbler Ridge, British Columbia granted membership as an expansion team in the West Division.
- Tumbler Ridge Steel Kings of Tumbler Ridge, British Columbia folded after four games.

2023–24

- The Le Bécard de Senneterre joined from the defunct Canadian Premier Junior Hockey League.
- South Muskoka Shield was forced to suspended operations and put in dormancy with the option to return if new owners are found by February 1, 2024.
- Bancroft Rockhounds take leave of absence
- New Tecumseth Civics not active
- Tottenham Thunder rebranded as Tottenham Railers
- Windsor Aces take leave of absence
- The entire GMHL West was removed from the league prior to the 2023–24 season. The Burns Lake Timbermen of Burns Lake, British Columbia; Edson Eagles of Edson, Alberta; Fox Creek Ice Kings of Fox Creek, Alberta; Gibbons Pioneers of Gibbons, Alberta; High Prairie Red Wings of High Prairie, Alberta; Kitimat Saax of Kitimat, British Columbia; Mackenzie Mountaineers of Mackenzie, British Columbia; and Northern Alberta Tomahawks of Enoch, Alberta; formed the National Junior Hockey League (NJHL). The Slave Lake Icedogs of Slave Lake, Alberta folded. The British Columbia teams plus the Northern Alberta Tomahawks folded prior to the NJHL season opening. Most, if not all, the West Division teams were owned by a closely related group.

2025–26

- Temiscaming Titans not listed as an active team
- Almaguin announce new ownership. Returning the 2026-27 season
- Le Bécard de Senneterre of Senneterre, Quebec not listed on schedule
