= Tamworth, Ontario =

Coordinates: 44°29′N 76°59′W

Tamworth is a small community in Stone Mills township in Lennox and Addington County, Ontario, Canada. Tamworth is located due north of Napanee, and northeast of Belleville, near Beaver Lake. Beaver Lake flows into the Salmon River which runs through Tamworth and this flowing water was the source of much of the commerce of Tamworth's former mills.

== History ==
Originally settled in 1826, Calvin Wheeler built several mills here in the 1840s and it was originally known as Wheeler's Mills. In 1848, a post office opened under the current name, named after Tamworth, Staffordshire. Wheeler was an admirer of Sir Robert Peel, member of Parliament for Tamworth.

The area was settled by many Irish immigrants and by 1865 the population of the area was 500. In 1884 the Tamworth and Quebec Railway had three trains departing to Napanee each day. Once the forest cover had been removed the soil that remained was not of the best quality, but farmers persevered and the area included many cheese factories. Farmers could supplement their incomes cutting trees in winter to be floated down the Napanee River to mills in the south.

Tamworth today is a mix of farms, homes and cottages on Beaver Lake and includes the services such as churches, hockey arena, car wash, restaurants, a hardware store, grocery store, pharmacy, liquor store, library and many others.

== Gaeltacht ==
Tamworth is also home to the first Irish language-speaking area, or Gaeltacht, outside Ireland. Plans for the site include cabins to house upwards of 100 people, classrooms, and a museum.

== Sports ==
Tamworth had a Senior A amateur team from 2003 to 2005. The Braves played in the Eastern Ontario Senior Hockey League. A Tier II Junior "A" team, known as the Tamworth Cyclones, operated from 2007 to 2009 in the Greater Metro Junior A Hockey League.

== Noted people ==
- Franklin La Du Ferguson, second president of Pomona College
