= Tamworth Cyclones =

- City: Tamworth, Ontario, Canada
- League: Greater Metro Junior A Hockey League
- Operated: 2007-2009
- Home arena: Stone Mills Recreation Centre
- Colours: Black, Red, and White
- General manager: Rob Adams
- Head coach: Rob Adams

The Tamworth Cyclones were a Junior ice hockey team based in Tamworth, Ontario, Canada. They played in the Greater Metro Junior 'A' Hockey League.

== History ==
The Cyclones are one of six expansion teams for the 2007-08 GMHL season.

The Cyclones were noted for physical play during their two seasons in the GMHL.

The Tamworth Cyclones played their first ever game on September 7, 2007, against the Deseronto Storm in Deseronto, Ontario. The Storm defeated the Cyclones 3–2. On October 13, 2007, the Cyclones celebrated their first victory by defeating the Douro Dukes by a score of 9–2.

Despite a very slow start to their season, the Cyclone finished the season with a late run. Finishing tenth overall in the GMJHL with 14 wins in 42 games, the Cyclones were drafted to play the fourth place Deseronto Storm in the first round of the playoffs. The Cyclones competed closely with the Storm. Game one saw them lose to the Storm 4–3. The next game had the Cyclones lose a 2-1 nailbiter. When the games could not seem to get any closer, game three went into overtime with the Storm again prevailing 4–3. With their backs to wall, the Cyclone fought another close battle with the Storm, but lost by two, including an empty-netter, to bow out of their first ever playoff series 4-games-to-none.

In their second season, the Cyclones struggled finding the net as well as wins. Before what would have been the team's 75th game, the Cyclones called the game due to not having goaltenders to play the game. With both goaltender injured, it became clear that the Cyclone might struggle to ice a team anytime soon. This problem was compounded by the fact that they could not find ice time in their hometown and had to resort to buying ice time from surrounding communities and the poor health of the team's owner. On February 4, 2009, it became apparent that the Cyclones would not finish the 2008–09 season. It was announced the next day by the GMHL that the Cyclones would be granted a leave of absence.

== Season-by-Season Standings ==
Season	GP	W	L	T	OTL	GF	GA	P	Results
2007-08	42	14	25	-	3	209	251	31	10th GMJHL
2008-09	32	3	27	-	2	86	290	8	14th GMJHL*
2 Seasons	74	17	52	-	5	295	541	--	0.264

(*) Team folded.

=== Playoffs ===
- 2008 Lost bye round

Deseronto Storm defeated Tamworth Cyclones 4-games-to-none in bye round
