= Rama Aces =

- City: Rama, Ontario, Canada
- League: Greater Metro Junior A Hockey League
- Founded: 2012
- Folded: 2015
- Home arena: Mnjikaning Arena Sports Ki
- Colours: Dark Blue, Blue, and White
- Owner(s): TPA Sports
- General manager: Patrick Geary
- Head coach: Doug Taylor (2014-15)

The Rama Aces were a Junior ice hockey team based in Rama, Ontario, Canada. They played in the Greater Metro Junior A Hockey League.

== History ==
The Aces were announced on February 17, 2012, by the GMHL.

On May 7, 2015, after three years in the league, the Aces announced that the league had granted the team a one-year leave of absence. TPA Sports had purchased the team the previous year. They have not yet returned to action in the league.

== Season-by-season standings ==
Season	GP	W	L	T	OTL	GF	GA	Pts	Results	Playoffs
2012–13	42	23	16	0	3	211	199	49	6th GMHL	Lost Division Quarterfinals, 0-3 (Eagles)
2013–14	42	24	18	-	0	231	211	48	10th GMHL	Won Division Quarterfinals, 3-2 (Phantoms); Lost Division Semi - 0-3 - (Huskies)
2014–15	42	26	15	-	1	208	152	53	2nd NC Div; 9th GMHL	Won Division Semifinals, 3-2 (Bravehearts); Lost Conference Quarters, 0-3 -(Titans)
