= Ken Girard =

Canadian ice hockey player (1936–2023)

- Born: December 8, 1936 Toronto, Ontario, Canada
- Died: April 1, 2023 (aged 86) London, Ontario, Canada
- Height: 6 ft 0 in (183 cm)
- Weight: 184 lb (83 kg; 13 st 2 lb)
- Position: Right wing
- Shot: Right
- Played for: Toronto Maple Leafs
- Playing career: 1956–1962

Kenneth John Girard (December 8, 1936 – April 1, 2023) was a Canadian professional ice hockey player who played 7 games in the National Hockey League with the Toronto Maple Leafs between 1956 and 1960. The rest of his career, which lasted from 1956 to 1962, was spent in the minor leagues.

== Career statistics ==
=== Regular season and playoffs ===
			Regular season					Playoffs
Season	Team	League	GP	G	A	Pts	PIM	GP	G	A	Pts	PIM
1952–53	Toronto Marlboros U16	U16 AAA	—	—	—	—	—	—	—	—	—	—
1953–54	Weston Dukes	MetJBHL	—	—	—	—	—	—	—	—	—	—
1954–55	Toronto Marlboros	OHA	47	15	14	29	4	12	8	5	13	17
1954–55	Toronto Marlboros	M-Cup	—	—	—	—	—	11	3	2	5	0
1955–56	Toronto Marlboros	OHA	41	20	12	32	4	11	7	9	16	0
1955–56	Toronto Marlboros	M-Cup	—	—	—	—	—	13	9	7	16	8
1956–57	Toronto Maple Leafs	NHL	3	0	1	1	2	—	—	—	—	—
1956–57	Toronto Marlboros	OHA	35	23	11	34	4	1	0	0	0	0
1957–58	Toronto Maple Leafs	NHL	3	0	0	0	0	—	—	—	—	—
1957–58	Rochester Americans	AHL	52	13	10	23	2	—	—	—	—	—
1957–58	Shawinigan Falls Cataractes	QSHL	9	0	5	5	6	14	2	5	7	2
1959–60	Toronto Maple Leafs	NHL	1	0	0	0	0	—	—	—	—	—
1959–60	Sudbury Wolves	EPHL	15	5	2	7	0	9	0	1	1	4
1960–61	Sudbury Wolves	EPHL	65	23	18	41	6	—	—	—	—	—
1960–61	Rochester Americans	AHL	9	0	3	3	0	—	—	—	—	—
1961–62	Pittsburgh Hornets	AHL	21	4	2	6	2	—	—	—	—	—
1961–62	San Francisco Seals	WHL	31	9	11	20	2	2	0	0	0	0
AHL totals			82	17	15	32	4	—	—	—	—	—
EPHL totals			80	28	20	48	6	9	0	1	1	4
NHL totals			7	0	1	1	2	—	—	—	—	—
