= Oro-Medonte 77's =

- City: Guthrie, Ontario, Canada
- League: Greater Metro Junior A Hockey League
- Operated: 2008-2011
- Home arena: Oro-Medonte Community Centre
- Colours: Red, Black, and White
- General manager: Jeff Stack
- Head coach: Kirby Tokarski

The Oro-Medonte 77's were a Junior ice hockey team based out of Oro-Medonte, Ontario, Canada. Their arena was in the community of Guthrie, Ontario. They played in the Greater Metro Junior 'A' Hockey League.

== History ==
In April 2008, it was announced that Oro-Medonte had received its first junior hockey club since 1992. In May it was announced that the club would be known as the Oro-Medonte 77's. The name pays homage to Oro's long hockey history, and the team's predecessor the Oro 77's who participated in the Georgian Bay Junior C Hockey League from 1977 until 1992.

On September 15, 2008, the Oro-Medonte 77's played their first ever GMHL game, on the road, in Richmond Hill against the Ontario Lightning Rams. Oro emerged victorious, winning 8-6.

After three seasons in the GMHL, in the Summer of 2011, the 77's ceased operation.

== Season-by-Season Standings ==
Season	GP	W	L	T	OTL	GF	GA	P	Results
2008-09	43	22	15	-	6	205	165	50	8th GMJHL
2009-10	42	11	25	-	6	145	272	28	10th GMHL
2010-11	42	14	22	-	6	171	223	34	9th GMJHL
3 Seasons	127	47	62	-	18	521	660	--	0.441

=== Playoffs ===
- 2009 Lost division quarter-final

Nipissing Alouettes defeated Oro-Medonte 77's 3-games-to-none in division quarter-final

- 2010 Lost last minute qualifier

Toronto Canada Moose defeated Oro-Medonte 77's 6-4 in last minute qualifier

- 2011 Lost quarter-final

Oro-Medonte 77's defeated Algoma Avalanche 2-games-to-none in qualifier
South Muskoka Shield defeated Oro-Medonte 77's 3-games-to-none in quarter-final
