= Algoma Avalanche =

- City: Thessalon, Ontario, Canada
- League: Greater Metro Junior A Hockey League
- Operated: 2009-2012
- Home arena: Thessalon Community Arena
- Colours: Burgundy, Blue and White
- Owner(s): Earl Moffat
- General manager: Victor Duguay
- Head coach: Aaron Corbiere

The Algoma Avalanche were a Canadian Junior ice hockey team based in Thessalon, Ontario, Canada. They played in the Greater Metro Junior 'A' Hockey League.

== History ==
The Avalanche were formed in the summer of 2009. The Avalanche are the first junior team in Thessalon since the folding of the Thessalon Flyers of the North of Superior Junior B Hockey League.

On September 12, 2009, the Avalanche played their first game. On the road, Algoma lost 7-4 to the Deseronto Storm. The next evening, the Avalanche traveled to Beaverton, Ontario and picked up their first win, beating the Brock Bucks 6-3. On September 25, 2009, the Avalanche played their first home game and defeated their local rival Elliot Lake Bobcats 4-2. In a touching pre-game ceremony, local hockey legend, and multiple-time OHA champion Lloyd Boyer, who had died of cancer a few weeks before, was honored with a moment of silence. Surviving children Brad, Janna, Susan, and Karen (who is also battling cancer) provided the ceremonial puck drop.

In mid-January 2011, it was announced that the town of Iron Bridge, Ontario and its 500-seat Outdoor Arena would host a regular season game, known as the North Shore Winter Classic, between the Elliot Lake Bobcats and Algoma Avalanche on January 29, 2011. This is the first known regulation outdoor game in Ontario in the modern era. Elliot Lake would win the game 8-2 in front of an estimated 400 fans.

On July 17, 2012, the Avalanche announced that they were ceasing operation, but claim they may return for 2013-14.

== Season-by-Season Standings ==
Season	GP	W	L	T	OTL	GF	GA	P	Results	Playoffs
2009-10	42	19	22	-	1	162	196	39	8th GMHL	Lost quarter-final
2010-11	42	8	31	-	3	187	337	19	13th GMHL	Lost qualifier
2011-12	42	6	34	-	2	115	288	14	14th GMHL	Lost Bye Round

=== Playoffs ===
- 2010 Lost quarter-final

Algoma Avalanche defeated Powassan Dragons 6-2 in the last minute qualifier
Algoma Avalanche defeated Toronto Canada Moose 2-games-to-1 in qualifier series
Elliot Lake Bobcats defeated Algoma Avalanche 3-games-to-none in quarter-final

- 2011 Lost qualifier

Oro-Medonte 77's defeated Algoma Avalanche 2-games-to-none in qualifier

- 2012 Lost bye round

South Muskoka Shield defeated Algoma Avalanche 2-games-to-none in bye round
