= Richmond Hill Rampage =

Junior ice hockey team

- City: Richmond Hill, Ontario, Canada
- League: Greater Metro Junior A Hockey League
- Operated: 2006-2009; 2024-present
- Home arena: Elvis Stojko Arena
- Colours: Black, Red, and White
- General manager: Michael Squeo
- Head coach: Mario Cicchillo

Franchise history
- 2006-2008: Richmond Hill Rams
- 2008-2009: Ontario Lightning Rams
- 2024-current: Richmond Hill Rampage

The Richmond Hill Rampage is an expansion Junior ice hockey team based in Richmond Hill, Ontario, Canada. They play in the Greater Metro Junior 'A' Hockey League.

== History ==
=== Richmond Hill Rams ===
The Richmond Hill Rams were a Junior ice hockey team based in Richmond Hill, Ontario, Canada. They played in the Greater Metro Junior 'A' Hockey League.

The Rams were a resurrection of the Richmond Hill Rams of the old Metro Junior A Hockey League, which folded in 1995. The creation of the new team, although in a renegade league, was the first Junior team to be established in Richmond Hill in 12 seasons.

The Rams' first game was the first in the GMHL's history. The game was at the Ram's home arena and took place on September 8, 2006, against King Wild. The final result was a 6–0 victory for the Rams. The first goal in the team's history was scored by Darren Archebald, in the first period on the powerplay. Archebald's goal was also the first in the league's history as well. Daniel Jones had the honour of goaltending the team and league's first win and shutout. The Rams 100th goal was scored on November 3, 2006, against the Nipissing Alouettes, scored by Frank Spano with 9:19 remaining in the second period. English player Craig Peacock was also the first player in the league to score a Hat Trick, this was on the 2nd day of the season in a 5–1 win against Nipissing, he also went on to top the whole league in scoring with 39 games played 48 goals and 34 assists for a total of 82 points, 17 ahead of his nearest challenger.

On January 2, 2008, the Rams hosted the Moscow Selects All-star team in an exhibition game. The Selects won the game by a score of 7–4. This was the fourth game of seven that the Moscow team played against different GMJHL clubs.

After finishing the 2007–08 season with exactly the same record as they did in the 2006–07 season, the Rams took a bye during the first round, then were challenged by the Innisfil Lakers in the quarter-final. The Lakers initially took a 3-games-to-none series lead, but the Rams battled back to force a winner-take-all Game 7. The Rams ran out of steam in Game 7 and were defeated 6-4 by the Lakers.

In March 2008, the Rams and King Wild engaged in a 4-game exhibition series against the Mexico national ice hockey team. The first of two games for the Rams was on the 20th, and finished with the Mexico national team winning 6–4. On the 24th, the Rams played them again and lost 5–2.

=== Ontario Lightning Rams ===
On January 8, 2008, the ownership of the Rams announced a new sponsorship that changed the team name to the "Ontario Lightning Rams" for 2008–09, but the deal and the name were dropped after one season. In the summer of 2009, the Rams took a leave of absence and never returned to action, along with sister-franchise Espanola Kings.

=== Richmond Hill Rampage ===
In January 2024, the GMHL announced the return to Richmond Hill with the awarding of an expansion franchise

== Season-by-season standings ==
Season	GP	W	L	T	OTL	GF	GA	P	Results	Playoffs
2006-07	42	25	15	-	2	230	187	52	3rd GMJHL	Won Quarterfinals 4-2, (Nipissing Alouettes); Lost Semifinals 2-4 (King Wild)
2007-08	42	25	15	-	2	225	165	52	6th GMJHL	Lost Quarterfinals 3-4, (Innisfil Lakers)
ONTARIO LIGHTNING RAMS
2008-09	43	13	30	-	0	174	258	26	12th GMJHL	Lost Quarterfinals 1-3, (Innisfil Lakers)
3 Seasons	127	63	60	-	4	629	610	--	0.512	

RICHMOND HILL RAMPAGE
Season	GP	W	L	T	OTL	GF	GA	P	Results	Playoffs
2024-25	42	4	37	-	1	85	266	9	9th of 9 Sou Div; 15 of 15 GMHL	Won Playin GAME 5-0 (Bradford Bulls); Lost Div Quarters 0-2 9 (Northumberland Stars)
2025-26	42	6	34	-	2	83	275	14	8th of 8 Sou Div; 14 of 14 GMHL	Lost div Quarter 0-2 (Northumberland Stars)

== Notable alumni ==
- Darren Archibald (Vancouver Canucks prospect)
- Craig Peacock (Belfast Giants)
- Shaun Stackhouse (Amarillo Gorillas)
