= Nipissing Alouettes =

- City: Sturgeon Falls, Ontario, Canada
- League: Greater Metro Junior A Hockey League
- Operated: 2006-2009
- Home arena: Sturgeon Falls Arena
- Colours: Blue, Red, and White
- General manager: Gerry St-Onge

The Nipissing Alouettes were a Canadian Junior ice hockey team based out of Sturgeon Falls, Ontario. They played in the Greater Metro Junior 'A' Hockey League.

== History ==
The Alouettes follow in the town's hockey tradition of the Sturgeon Falls Lynx who played in the town from 1994 until 2002 when they became the North Bay Skyhawks.

The first game in the Alouettes' history took place on September 9, 2006, against the Richmond Hill Rams. The result was a 5–1 loss. The first goal in Alouette history was scored by Matt Mascarin. Justin Longchamps took the loss in goal in the first game in Alouettes history, but played well facing more than 50 shots. The first home game in the team's history was on September 22, 2006, against the Bradford Rattlers, a 6–3 loss.

The Als celebrated their first victory on September 29, 2006. They defeated the Toronto Canada Moose by a score of 5–3.

Nipissing finished their inaugural season in 6th place, losing out on a season-long battle for fourth place against the Deseronto Thunder and Toronto Canada Moose. They drew the Richmond Hill Rams in the league quarter-final, but lost out 4-games-to-2.

In their 2007–2008 season, the Alouettes welcomed an entirely new squad, having only 2 returning players, Mackenzie Charron and Kory Cashaback. The 1st ever shutout in Alouettes history was recorded on Friday, September 28 by Tristan Jones, making 30 saves and adding an assist on his way to a 9-0 destruction of the struggling Toronto Canada Moose.

In April 2008, the Alouettes announced that Lui Ricci as the club's new head coach. Ricci spent the last part of the season with the Alouettes. He also brought in assistants Kevin Gauthier, Patrick Geary and former North Bay Centennial and NHLer Steve McLaren.

In 2009, after the team's strongest season to date, the Alouettes ceased operations. A year later, the Sturgeon Falls Lumberjacks were founded to fill their void in the GMHL.

=== Season-by-Season Standings ===
Season	GP	W	L	T	OTL	GF	GA	P	Results
2006-07	42	17	20	-	5	143	169	39	6th GMJHL
2007-08	42	14	27	-	1	178	266	29	12th GMJHL
2008-09	43	29	13	-	1	233	157	59	6th GMJHL
3 Seasons	127	60	60	-	7	554	592	--	0.500

=== Playoffs ===
- 2007 Lost quarter-final

Richmond Hill Rams defeated Nipissing Alouettes 4-games-to-2 in quarter-final

- 2008 Lost Bye round

Elliot Lake Bobcats defeated Nipissing Alouettes 4-games-to-1 in bye round

- 2009 Lost Division semi-final

Nipissing Alouettes defeated Oro-Medonte 77's 3-games-to-none in division quarter-final
South Muskoka Shield defeated Nipissing Alouettes 3-games-to-none in division semi-final
