= Toronto Blue Ice Jets =

- City: Thornhill, Ontario, Canada
- League: Greater Metro Junior A Hockey League
- Founded: 2006; 20 years ago
- Folded: 2016; 10 years ago
- Home arena: Thornhill Community Centre
- Colours: Black, Silver, White
- General manager: Chris Beckford – Tseu (2014–15)
- Head coach: Chris Beckford – Tseu (2014–15)

Franchise history
- 2006–2013: Toronto Canada Moose
- 2013–2016: Toronto Blue Ice Jets

The Toronto Blue Ice Jets were a Junior ice hockey team based out of Thornhill, Ontario, Canada. The team played in the Greater Metro Junior A Hockey League (GMHL).

== History ==
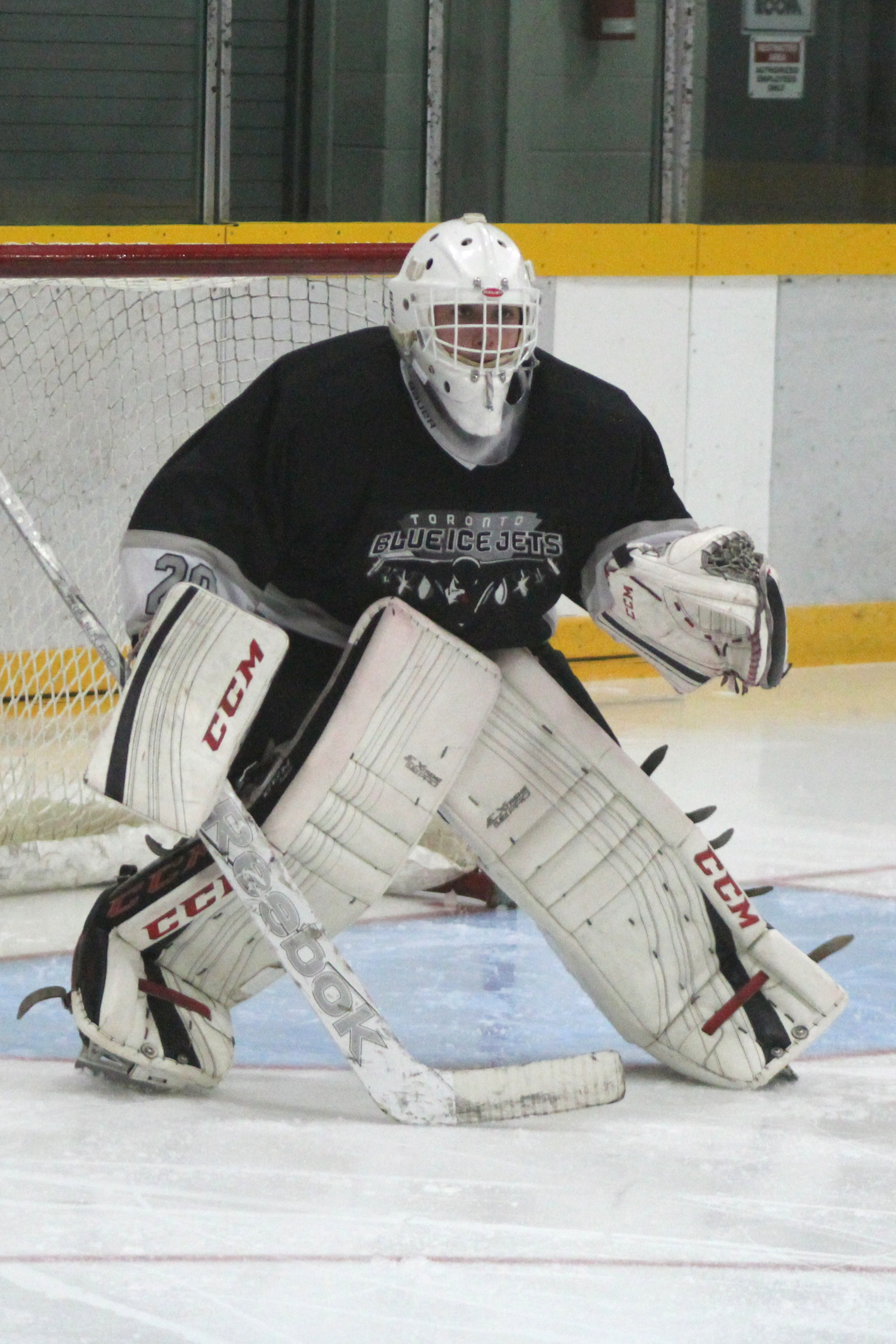
Blue Ice Jets goalie during 2015-16 season.

The Jets were Thornhill's only Junior hockey team after the Ontario Provincial Junior A Hockey League's Toronto Thunderbirds relocated to King City to become the Villanova Knights.

Logo of Moose 2006–2013.

They were founded as the Toronto Canada Moose in the inaugural year of the GMHL in the 2006–07 season as one of seven original league members. The first game took place on September 9, 2006, against the King Wild in Thornhill, Ontario resulting in a 5-1 loss. On September 11, 2006, the team earned their first win defeating the Deseronto Thunder by a score of 5-2. The Moose finished their inaugural season with a 19-20-0-3 record. They placed fifth in the league after a season long race for fourth with the Deseronto Thunder and Nipissing Alouettes. Their first playoff appearance put them up against the King Wild in the league quarterfinals. Unfortunately, the Moose were eliminated in five games in a best-of-seven series (3-8, 8-3, 3-5, 1-9, 2-6).

The Moose started their second season off very slowly. After breaking a long losing streak, the Moose managed to earn fourteen more wins but still only finished in eleventh place in the now thirteen team league. In the first round, the Moose were picked to oppose the top seeded Bradford Rattlers. The Moose managed to keep it close over the first three games but the Rattlers still swept the series in four games.

On January 3, 2008, the Moose played against Kazakhstan's Torpedo UST-Kamenogorsk Under-18 squad in an exhibition game. Despite rallying to tie the game 4-4 at the end of the second, the Moose fell to the Torpedo 8-5.

In spring 2013, the Moose were renamed the Blue Ice Jets. On September 6, 2013, the Blue Ice Jets played their first game since changing ownership against South Muskoka Shield and lost 5-4. The first win under the Blue Ice Jets name took place on September 7, 2013 against the Bobcaygeon Bucks in Thornhill, Ontario. The Blue Ice Jets beat the Bucks 17-2.

For the 2016–17 season, the Blue Ice Jets were scheduled to play their first home game on September 6, 2016. However, the team never took the ice and within a week the Blue Ice Jets had been removed from the GMHL. On September 13, the GMHL president stated that the Blue Ice Jets had taken the season off and possibly plans to relocate for the next season.

== Season-by-season records ==
Season	GP	W	L	T	OTL	GF	GA	Pts	Regular season finish	Playoffs
Toronto Canada Moose
2006–07	42	19	20	—	3	189	204	41	5th GMJHL	Lost quarter-finals
2007–08	42	14	27	—	1	154	254	29	11th GMJHL	Lost bye Round
2008–09	43	18	21	—	4	205	204	40	9th GMJHL	Lost division quarter-finals
2009–10	42	15	23	—	4	172	212	34	9th GMJHL	Lost qualifier series
2010–11	42	17	23	—	2	195	206	36	8th GMJHL	Lost semi-finals
2011–12	42	17	23	—	2	153	211	36	10th GMJHL	Lost bye round
2012–13	42	12	28	0	2	153	261	26	13th GMHL	Lost division quarter-finals
Toronto Blue Ice Jets
2013–14	42	32	9	—	1	304	150	65	5th GMHL	Lost division semi-finals
2014–15	42	33	9	—	0	257	107	66	2nd South-Central Div; 6th GMHL	Lost conference semi-finals
2015–16	42	18	22	1	1	151	196	38	8th South Div; 21st GMHL	Lost qualifier game

=== Playoffs ===
Moose player in away jersey

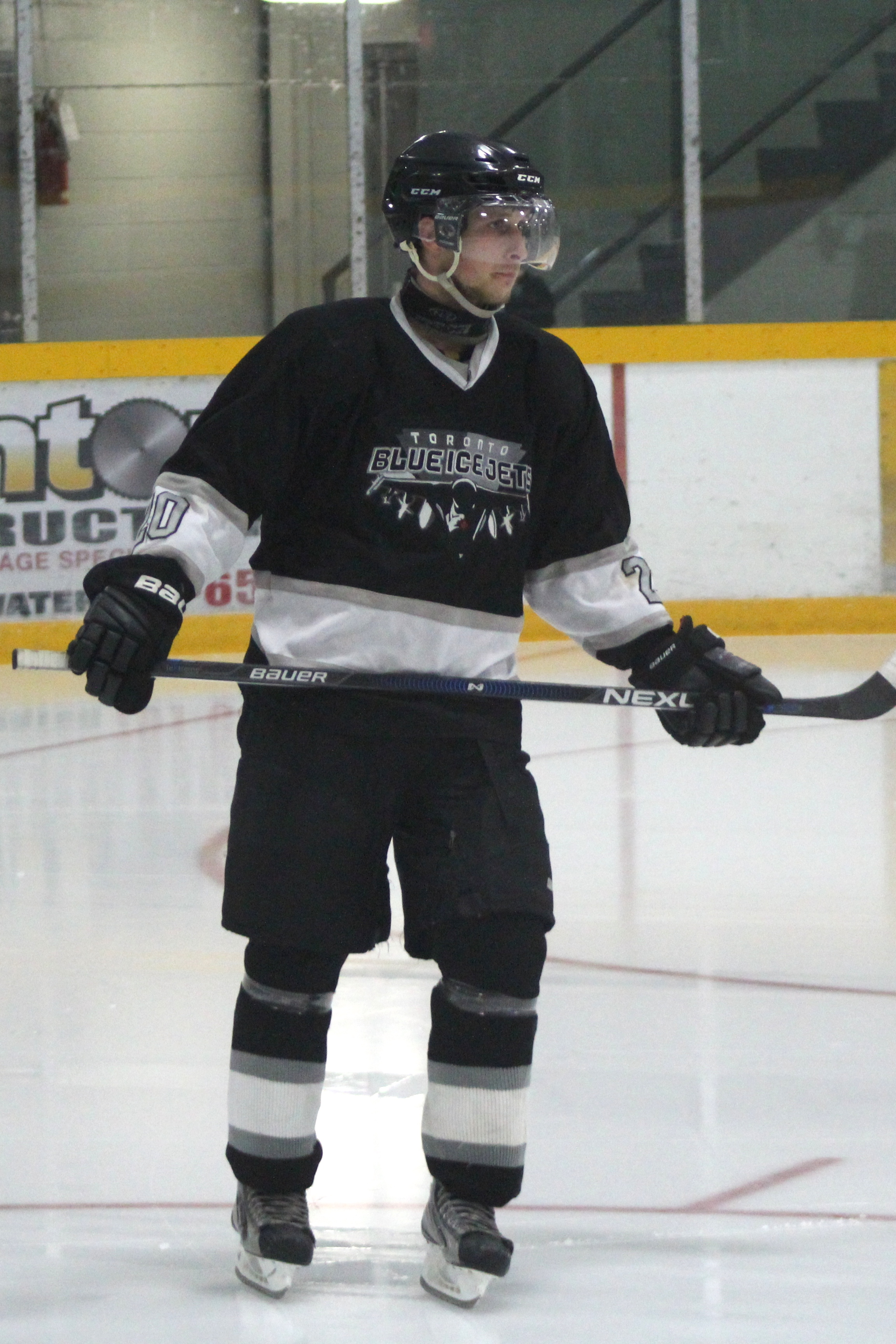
Blue Ice Jets skater during 2015-16 season.

- 2007 Lost quarter-final

King Wild defeated Toronto Canada Moose 4-games-to-1 in quarter-final

- 2008 Lost bye round

Bradford Rattlers defeated Toronto Canada Moose 4-games-to-none in bye round

- 2009 Lost division quarter-final

Bradford Rattlers defeated Toronto Canada Moose 3-games-to-2 in division quarter-final

- 2010 Lost qualifier series

Toronto Canada Moose defeated Oro-Medonte 77's 6-4 in last minute qualifier
Algoma Avalanche defeated Toronto Canada Moose 2-games-to-1 in qualifier series

- 2011 Lost semi-final

Toronto Canada Moose defeated Vaughan Wild 9-1 in last minute qualifier
Toronto Canada Moose defeated Shelburne Red Wings 2-games-to-none in qualifier
Toronto Canada Moose defeated Jamestown Jets 3-games-to-1 in quarter-final
Elliot Lake Bobcats defeated Toronto Canada Moose 4-games-to-none in semi-final

- 2012 Lost bye round

Deseronto Storm defeated Toronto Canada Moose 2-games-to-none in bye round

- 2013 Lost division quarter-final

Bradford Bulls defeated Toronto Canada Moose 3-games-to-1 in division quarter-final

- 2014 Lost division semi-final

Toronto Blue Ice Jets defeated Halton Ravens 3-games-to-none in division quarter-final
Bradford Rattlers defeated Toronto Blue Ice Jets 3-games-to-1 in division semi-final

- 2015 Lost conference quarter-final

Toronto Blue Ice Jets defeated Rattlers 3-games-to-2 in division semi-final
Toronto Attack defeated Toronto Blue Ice Jets 3-games-to-0 in conference semi-final

- 2016 Lost qualifier game

North York Renegades defeated Toronto Blue Ice Jets 5–1 in qualifier game
