= Shelburne Stars =

- City: Shelburne, Ontario, Canada
- League: Greater Metro Junior A Hockey League
- Founded: 2010; 16 years ago
- Folded: 2016; 10 years ago
- Home arena: Centre Dufferin Recreation Complex
- Owner(s): RCR Entertainment
- General manager: Ryan Zeng (2015)
- Head coach: Jeff Oliver (2015)

Franchise history
- 2010–2014: Shelburne Red Wings
- 2014–2015: Shelburne Stars (DNP)
- 2015–2016: Shelburne Sharks
- 2016: Shelburne Stars (DNP)

The Shelburne Stars were a junior ice hockey team based in Shelburne, Ontario, Canada. They played in the Greater Metro Junior A Hockey League (GMHL). Established in 2010, the team was originally known as the Shelburne Red Wings. They are also commonly known as the Shelburne HTI Stars due to a sponsorship agreement.

== History ==
The Red Wings were formed in 2010 by Russian businessman Igor Vasilyev. The team was composed primarily of imported Russian hockey players. The Red Wings were the first junior hockey club in Shelburne since the Shelburne Wolves of the Metro Junior A Hockey League and Ontario Provincial League.

On September 11, 2010, the Red Wings played their first game, a road game in Thornhill versus the Toronto Canada Moose. The Red Wings were victorious, 5–4.

In December 2010, the Red Wings and the town of Shelburne became the centre of attention due to a pair of articles written by the Toronto Star's Robert Cribb. Cribb interviewed the coach Jim Aldred, the players, the player's parents, and town residents to gain perspective on the team, the reaction of the town and Hockey Canada officials to the team. Aldred felt that the Russian players were tough on each other and needed strict guidance, and that he was privileged to coach them coming to Canada to "better themselves" despite his suspension by Hockey Canada for coaching in an unaffiliated league.

The Detroit Red Wings Alumni Association contacted the team to ask how they may help these players. The Mayor of Shelburne, Ed Crewson, held a town meeting to discuss Hockey Canada's policies, which he has labelled, "...severe and draconian."

In the autumn of 2011, the team decided to drop its exclusivity of Russian players, allowing players of all nationalities to participate in the Red Wings program.

In 2014, the team was sold and changed its name to the Shelburne HTI Stars. The team went on a one-year hiatus to reorganize and is scheduled to return to the GMHL for the 2015–16 season.

The Shelburne Sharks started operations under new ownership in 2015–16. The team's first Sharks captain was defenseman Storm Evans who played with the Red Wings in their last year of existence.

After the 2015–16 season, a new ownership was announced again and the team reverted to the Shelburne Stars. However, when the 2016–17 GMHL season schedule was released, the Stars were longer listed as an active team.

== Season-by-season standings ==
Season	GP	W	L	T	OTL	GF	GA	Pts	Results	Playoffs
Shelburne Red Wings
2010–11	42	25	15	—	2	230	195	52	5th of 13 GMHL	Lost Qualifier, 0-2 (Canada Moose)
2011–12	42	8	32	—	2	116	263	18	11th of 13 GMHL	Lost Bye Round, 0-2 (Wave)
2012–13	42	17	25	0	0	191	230	34	10th of 15 GMHL	Lost Division Quarterfinal, 2-3 (Americans)
2013–14	42	3	37	–	2	124	372	8	20th of 20 GMHL	Lost Qualifier Game, 7-16 (Knights)
Shelburne Stars
2014–15	Did not participate									
Shelburne Sharks
2015–16	42	7	35	0	0	123	332	14	10th Central Div; 28th GMHL	Lost 1st Round Play-in Game, 4-8 (Chiefs)

== League award winners ==
Marshall Uretsky Award (MVP)

- (Russia) Alexander Nikulnikov (2010–11)

Bob Bernstein Award (Top Scorer)

- (Russia) Stan Dzakhov (2010–11)

Al Donnan Award (Best Goaltender)

- (Russia) Anton Kodykov (2012–13)
