= Deseronto Storm =

- City: Deseronto, Ontario, Canada
- League: Empire B Junior C Hockey League
- Founded: 2006
- Folded: 2016
- Home arena: Deseronto Community Recreation Centre
- Colours: Orange, Black, and White
- Owner(s): Adam Maracle
- General manager: Adam Maracle
- Head coach: Rob Adams

Franchise history
- 2006-2007: Deseronto Thunder
- 2007-2016: Deseronto Storm

The Deseronto Storm were a Junior ice hockey team based in Deseronto, Ontario, Canada. They played in the Empire B Junior C Hockey League but are former original members of the Greater Metro Junior 'A' Hockey League.

== History ==
Brad Mallen (2006)

=== 2006-07 ===
Thunder Logo (2006)

The Thunder filled a gap left since 1998 in the Deseronto community. The Quinte Hawks of the Metro Junior A Hockey League left a troubled legacy in the town of Deseronto. The team moved to Bancroft, Ontario after the Metro folded in 1998. In early 2006, it became quite apparent that hockey was coming back to the town. As a member of the new renegade GMHL, the Thunder hope to bring junior hockey back to Deseronto for good.

The Deseronto Thunder's first ever game took place on September 9, 2006 against the South Muskoka Shield in Deseronto, Ontario. The Thunder were victorious, romping the Shield by a score of 8-1. The first goal scored in Thunder history was scored by Mitchell Wood. Brad Mallen picked up the historical first victory in net.

Alternate Thunder Logo (2007)

So far, the 2006-07 season has drawn an enthusiastic response from the Deseronto community. Large crowds have been attending the games. The Thunder have been putting up decent results. At the Christmas break of the 2006-07 season, the Thunder are sitting at a slightly better than .500 record and are looking good for a decent playoff seed at this point. On January 21, 2007, the Thunder ended the Bradford Rattlers record 31 game streak of games without a regulation loss with a 6-5 victory.

The Thunder finished the 2006-07 season in fourth place. They drew the South Muskoka Shield in the playoff quarter-final. The Thunder swept the Shield 4-games-to-none and summoned the resting first place Bradford Rattlers. The Rattlers drew a bye in the quarter-final and showed considerable rust in the semi-final versus the Thunder. The Thunder shocked the Rattlers and the entire league by taking an early 2-games-to-none lead in the series. The Rattlers regained their legs in game three and battled through 4 extremely tight games to end the Thunders first trip to the playoffs with a 4-games-to-2 series win. The Rattlers went on to win the Russell Cup as league champions and the Alliance Cup as NJHA champions.

=== 2007-08 ===
On June 10, 2007, it was announced that the Deseronto Thunder would not be returning to the GMHL. The Thunder became the first team in GMHL history to fold. Despite having some of the best crowds in the GMHL, the Thunder seemed to have suffered from financial difficulties. Many players were traded away before the announcement, but with the folding all carded players were officially released. On June 15, 2007, GMJHL President Bob Russell announced that the ownership of the team had been transferred to the Town of Deseronto and that the team will return in 2007-08, but under a new name. In late June, it was announced that the team would now be called the Deseronto Storm.

On January 1, 2008, the Storm hosted the Moscow Selects All-star team in an exhibition game. The Selects won the game by a score of 7-1. This was the seventh and final game that the Moscow team played against different GMJHL clubs.

The Bradford Rattlers were at a 28-game streak of games without a regulation loss (from the start of a season) on January 6, 2008, closing in on their record of 31. For the second season in a row Deseronto dug their heals into the ground and stopped the Rattlers' streak cold with a 5-3 win. As of that date, the Rattlers were given only their second regulation loss in 76 regular season games.

=== 2008-09 ===
After three years of playoff contentions the Deseronto Storm clinched the South Division Title and made their way to the Russell Cup Finals with a 4-3 overtime win over the Innisfil Lakers.

The Deseronto Storm would go on to play the South Muskoka Shield in the 2009 Russell Cup Finals. The Storm lost to the Shield in 6 games.

== Season-by-Season Standings ==
Season	GP	W	L	T	OTL	GF	GA	P	Results	Playoffs
2006-07	42	19	18	-	5	173	163	43	4th GMHL	Lost semi-final
2007-08	42	27	13	-	2	219	158	56	4th GMHL	Lost quarter-final
2008-09	43	29	11	-	3	224	121	61	5th GMHL	Lost final
2009-10	42	29	11	-	2	222	152	60	4th GMHL	Won League
2010-11	42	20	21	-	1	181	211	41	7th GMHL	Lost quarter-final
2011-12	42	22	17	-	3	193	193	47	7th GMHL	Lost quarter-final
2012-13	40	3	37	-	0	79	289	6	6th EBJCHL	DNQ
2013-14	40	3	36	-	1	59	329	7	6th EBJCHL	DNQ
2014-15	40	1	39	0	-	71	317	2	6th EBJCHL	DNQ

=== Playoffs ===
- 2007 Lost semi-final

Deseronto Thunder defeated South Muskoka Shield 4-games-to-none in quarter-final
Bradford Rattlers defeated Deseronto Thunder 4-games-to-2 in semi-final

- 2008 Lost quarter-final

Deseronto Storm defeated Tamworth Cyclones 4-games-to-none in bye round
Elliot Lake Bobcats defeated Deseronto Storm 4-games-to-2 in quarter-final

- 2009 Lost final

Deseronto Storm defeated King Wild 3-games-to-none in division quarter-final
Deseronto Storm defeated Bradford Rattlers 3-games-to-1 in division semi-final
Deseronto Storm defeated Innisfil Lakers 4-games-to-2 in division final
South Muskoka Shield defeated Deseronto Storm 4-games-to-2 in final

- 2010 Won League

Deseronto Storm defeated Innisfil Lakers 3-games-to-none in quarter-final
Deseronto Storm defeated Elliot Lake Bobcats 4-games-to-2 in semi-final
Deseronto Storm defeated South Muskoka Shield 4-games-to-3 in final

- 2011 Lost quarter-final

Deseronto Storm defeated Bobcaygeon Bucks 2-games-to-none in qualifier
Bradford Rattlers defeated Deseronto Storm 3-games-to-none in quarter-final

- 2012 Lost quarter-final

Deseronto Storm defeated Toronto Canada Moose 2-games-to-none in bye round
Sturgeon Falls Lumberjacks defeated Deseronto Storm 3-games-to-2 in quarter-final
