= Colborne Cramahe Hawks =

- City: Colborne, Ontario, Canada
- League: World United Hockey League
- Founded: 2007; 19 years ago
- Folded: 2015; 11 years ago
- Home arena: Keeler Centre
- Colours: Black, Red, and White
- General manager: Mike Jeschke
- Head coach: Mike Jeschke
- Media: The Sports Cave

Franchise history
- 2007–2008: Douro Dukes
- 2008–2010: Brock Bucks
- 2010–2014: Bobcaygeon Bucks
- 2014–2015: Colborne Cramahe Hawks

The Colborne Cramahe Hawks were a Canadian Junior ice hockey team based in Colborne, Ontario. The Hawks were members of the World United Hockey League.

Competing in the Greater Metro Junior 'A' Hockey League from 2007 until 2014, the Hawks originated as the Douro Dukes of Douro, Ontario in 2007. From 2008 until 2014, the team was known as the Bucks from Beaverton, Ontario and later Bobcaygeon, Ontario.

== History ==
The Douro Dukes were one of six expansion teams for the 2007–08 GMHL season.

On September 6, 2007, the Douro Dukes played their first-ever game at the Ennismore Arena against the Innisfil Lakers. John Minarik made 27 saves to record the Dukes first victory and first-ever shutout by a score of 2–0. Tony DeCarlo scored both the first and second goal in franchise history in the third period of this very close contest.

After a strong start to the season, the Dukes lost many of their key players to defections to other clubs including: Guy Wallace, Brad Meyers, Mike Banelopoulos, Andrew Bobas, John Minark and Mike Madgett. The Dukes won two of their first four games, beating Innisfil and the Nipissing Alouettes, but the bottom dropped out and the Dukes went on a horrid 38-game losing streak. Despite this, the Dukes ended up facing the King Wild in the first round of the playoffs. They kept the first game close, and games two, three, and four close until the third period, but the previous year's finalists swept the series 4 games to none.

In April 2008, it was announced that the Dukes had moved to become the Warsaw Redmen, but a month later it was disclosed that the team would instead move to Beaverton, Ontario and would be called the Brock Bucks.

On September 14, 2008, the Brock Bucks played their first ever game since relocation. The game was against the Minden Riverkings in Minden Hills. The Bucks won 7–5 which snapped the longest running multi-season losing streak in the GMHL at 38 losses. This win was the franchise's first win since September 22, 2007.

In the summer of 2010, it was announced that the team was moving to Kawartha Lakes and becoming the Bobcaygeon Bucks.

In the Spring of 2014, the team announced that after four seasons in the GMHL the team would relocate to Colborne, Ontario as members of the newly formed Canadian International Hockey League. The Hawks, after nine games would find themselves in seventh place out of eight teams. In mid-November, the Hawks left the CIHL with four other teams, but before they could join the other teams in a new league they were locked out of their arena over unpaid bills and forced to temporarily cease operations. The team reorganized and joined the new World United Hockey League with the former CIHL teams. After the demise of WUHL in 2015, the club has no activity.

== Season-by-season standings ==
Season	GP	W	L	T	OTL	GF	GA	Pts	Results	Playoffs
Douro Dukes
2007–08	42	2	40	-	0	108	392	4	13th, GMHL	Lost bye round
Brock Bucks
2008–09	43	15	26	-	2	191	242	32	11th, GMHL	Lost division quarter-final
2009–10	42	20	18	-	4	178	207	44	6th, GMHL	Lost quarter-final
Bobcaygeon Bucks
2010–11	42	23	18	-	1	212	181	47	6th, GMHL	Lost qualifier
2011–12	42	8	34	-	0	131	256	16	13th, GMHL	Lost bye round
2012–13	42	16	25	1	0	158	214	33	11th, GMHL	Lost division semi-final
2013–14	42	11	27	-	4	169	290	26	16th, GMHL	Lost division quarter-final
Colborne Cramahe Hawks
2014–15	9	1	8	0	0	17	53	2	DNF, CIHL	Did not play
2014–15	22	6	16	0	0	35	110	12	4th, WUHL	Lost semi-finals

=== Playoffs ===
2008

King Wild defeated Douro Dukes 4-games-to-none in bye round

2009

South Muskoka Shield defeated Brock Bucks 3-games-to-none in division quarter-final

2010

Bradford Rattlers defeated Brock Bucks 3-games-to-none in quarter-final

2011

Deseronto Storm defeated Bobcaygeon Bucks 2-games-to-none in qualifier

2012

Elliot Lake Bobcats defeated Bobcaygeon Bucks 2-games-to-1 in bye round

2013

Bobcaygeon Bucks defeated Toronto Attack 3-games-to-2 in division quarter-final
Bradford Rattlers defeated Bobcaygeon Bucks 3-games-to-none in division semi-final

2014

Bobcaygeon Bucks beat Sturgeon Falls Lumberjacks 9-8 in qualifier
Seguin Huskies defeated Bobcaygeon Bucks 3-games-to-none in division quarter-final

2015

St. Charles North Stars defeated Colborne Cramahe Hawks 2-games-to-none in semi-final

== Notable alumni ==
- Nikolai Skladnichenko , Derek Bristol
