= Bradford Bulls (ice hockey) =

- City: Bradford West Gwillimbury, Ontario, Canada
- League: Greater Metro Junior A Hockey League
- Division: South
- Founded: 2012; 14 years ago
- Home arena: Bob Fallis Sports Centre
- Colours: Dark blue, yellow, and white
- Owner: Darren Brown
- Head coach: Jesse Gatt (2025-)

The Bradford Bulls are a Canadian junior ice hockey team based in Bradford West Gwillimbury, Ontario, Canada. They play in the Greater Metro Junior A Hockey League (GMHL).

== History ==
The Bulls were announced on February 23, 2012, by the GMHL. They are the namesake of the old Bradford Bulls Junior C team that which became the Bradford Rattlers. The Ratters and Bulls play out of different arenas in Bradford, but gave the Rattlers a geographical rival.

The Bradford Bulls first regular season game was on September 16, 2012, in Bradford West Gwillimbury, Ontario. The game was on the road against the cross-town rivals the Bradford Rattlers. The game resulted in a 6–2 loss for the Bulls but had its first goal in franchise history scored by Clint Zumer, and assisted by Justin Tucker. On September 26, 2012, the Bulls would pick up their first franchise victory defeating the Lefroy Wave at home, 9–7. Donald Oldreive made 41 saves to pick up the victory.

On March 26, 2013, the Bradford Bulls won the GMHL playoffs in a 4-games-to-1 series victory against their hometown rival and defending champion Bradford Rattlers. The Bulls finished the regular season in first place in the South Division, fourth overall and three points out of second. They faced the Knights of Meaford in the first round and swept them 3-games-to-none. In the second round, they swept territorial rival Alliston Coyotes 3-games-to-none. Instead of a division final, the league elected to do a divisional crossover and the Bulls had to face the second seed from the North, the Temiscaming Royals. The Bulls took the series in a four-game sweep and were set to face the Rattlers in a "Sidewalk Series" as they knocked off the first seeded Seguin Huskies. Although the Rattlers gave the Bulls their only loss of the playoffs, it was not enough as the Bulls took their first league title after only two years of existence.

== Season-by-season standings ==
Season	GP	W	L	T	OTL	GF	GA	Pts	Regular season finish	Playoffs
2012–13	42	20	20	0	2	182	195	42	8th GMHL	Lost Division Semi-finals
2013–14	42	32	6	—	4	226	109	68	4th GMHL	Won League
2014–15	42	12	29	—	1	144	221	25	5th South-Central Div. 15th GMHL	Lost Conference Elimination
2015–16	42	25	13	0	4	226	168	54	4th Central Div. 12th GMHL	Lost Division Quarter-finals
2016–17	42	19	20	0	3	181	172	41	7th of 10, North Div. 14th of 21, GMHL	Lost Division Quarter-finals
2017–18	42	28	14	0	0	235	165	56	5th of 12, South Div. 9th of 21, GMHL	Lost in Division Semi-finals
2018–19	42	18	20	0	4	194	181	40	7th of 10, North Div. 15th of 22, GMHL	Lost in Division Quarter-finals
2019–20	42	29	12	0	1	180	140	59	3rd of 10, North Div. 6th of 23, GMHL	Lost in Division Semi-finals
2020–21	Lost season due to COVID-19 pandemic									
2021–22	38	25	9	0	4	154	109	54	3rd of 10, North Div. 6th of 19, GMHL	Won division Quarters, 2-0 (Rockhounds); Won Division Semi-finals, 3-2 (Bradford Rattlers); Lost division finals, 0-4 (Temiscaming Titans)
2022–23	42	31	8	0	3	250	117	65	3rd of 9, North Div. 5th of 16, GMHL	Won division Quarters, 2-0 (Northumberland Stars); Won Division Semi-finals, 3-0 (Durham Roadrunners); Lost division finals, 1-4 (North York Renegades)
2023–24	42	26	16	0	0	267	118	52	2nd of 8, North Div. 5th of 15, GMHL	Won division Quarters, 2-0 (Northumberland Stars); Won Division Semi-finals, 3-0 (Durham Roadrunners); Won Div Finals 4-0 (Renegades); Lost League Finals. 1-4 (Bradford Rattlers)
2024–25	42	14	26	0	2	167	213	30	8th of 9, South Div. 13th of 15, GMHL	Lost Playin GAME, 0-5 (Richmond Hill Rampage)
2025–26	42	11	30	0	1	102	196	23	7th of 8, South Div. 12th of 14, GMHL	Lost Siv Quarter, 0-2 (Durham Roadrunners)

=== Playoffs ===
- 2013

Bradford Bulls defeated Toronto Canada Moose 3-games-to-1 in division quarter-finals
Orangeville Americans defeated Bradford Bulls 3-games-to-1 in division semi-finals

- 2014

Bradford Bulls defeated Knights of Meaford 3-games-to-none in division quarter-finals
Bradford Bulls defeated Alliston Coyotes 3-games-to-none in division semi-finals
Bradford Bulls defeated Temiscaming Titans 4-games-to-none in crossover series
Bradford Bulls defeated Bradford Rattlers 4-games-to-1 in finals
Russell Cup Champions

- 2015

Orangeville Americans defeated Bradford Bulls 6–5 (game) in Conference Elimination Round 1

- 2016

Oshawa Riverkings defeated Bradford Bulls 3-games-to-none in division quarter-finals

- 2017

Parry Sound Islanders defeated Bradford Bulls 3-games-to-none in division quarter-finals

- 2018

Bradford Bulls defeated North York Renegades 2-games-to-1 in division quarter-finals
St. George Ravens defeated Bradford Bulls 3-games-to-none in division semi-finals

- 2019

Ville-Marie Pirates defeated Bradford Bulls 2-games-to-1 in division quarter-finals

- 2020

Bradford Bulls defeated Bancroft Rockhounds 2-games-to-1 in division quarter-finals
Bradford Rattlers defeated Bradford Bulls 3-games-to-2 in division semi-finals

== League award winners ==
- Marshall Uretsky Award

An annual award "to the player who is adjudged the most valuable player (MVP) in the regular season"
- (Finland) Tomi Taavitsainen 2014

- Tyler Fines Award

An annual award "to the player selected as the most proficient in his first year of competition in the GMHL"
- (United States) Zan Hobbs 2015
- (Russia) Sergei Bolshakov 2014
- (Canada) Devon Gillham 2013

- Louis Ricci Award

An annual award "to the forward who demonstrates throughout the season the greatest ability at the position"
- (Finland) Tomi Taavitsainen 2014

- Al Donnan Award

An annual award "to the goaltender adjudged to be the best at his position"
- (Russia) Sergei Bolshakov 2014

== Notable alumni ==
- Sergei Bolshakov
