= 2015–16 GMHL season =

2015-16 GMHL season
- League: Greater Metro Junior A Hockey League
- Sport: Hockey
- Duration: Regular season 2015-09-08 – 2016-02-14; Playoffs; 2016-02-15 – 2016-04-04
- Teams: 32
- Finals champions: Tottenham Steam

GMHL seasons
- 2014–15 2016–17

The 2015–16 GMHL season was the tenth season of the Greater Metro Junior A Hockey League (GMHL). The thirty-two teams of the GMHL played 42-game schedules.

Starting in February 2016, the top teams of the league played down for the Russell Cup, emblematic of the grand championship of the GMHL. Since the GMHL is independent from Hockey Canada and the Canadian Junior Hockey League, this is where the GMHL's season ended.

== Changes ==
- Expansion granted to the Bobcaygeon Storm of Bobcaygeon, Ontario.
- Expansion granted to the Brantford Steelfighters of Brantford, Ontario. Brantford folded and was removed from the league schedule on November 5, 2015.
- Cambridge Bears take the season off to restructure.
- Expansion granted to the Colborne Chiefs of Colborne, Ontario.
- Expansion granted to the Coldwater Falcons of Coldwater, Ontario.
- Expansion granted to the Grey County Grizzlies of Grey County, Ontario. Grey County folded and was removed from the league schedule on December 2, 2015.
- Expansion granted to the Haliburton Wolves of Haliburton, Ontario.
- Expansion granted to the Kingsville Kings of Kingsville, Ontario.
- Expansion granted to the Komoka Dragons of Komoka, Ontario.
- Expansion granted to the London Lakers of London, Ontario.
- Expansion was granted to the Norfolk Vikings of Norfolk, Ontario.
- Orangeville Americans renamed Orangeville Ice Crushers.
- Expansion granted to the Oshawa Riverkings of Oshawa, Ontario.
- Rama Aces take season off to restructure.
- Shelburne Stars was renamed Shelburne Sharks.
- Sturgeon Falls Lumberjacks folded February 1, 2016.

== Current Standings ==
Note: GP = Games played; W = Wins; L = Losses; T = Tie; OTL = Overtime losses; GF = Goals for; GA = Goals against; PTS = Points; x = clinched playoff berth; q = relegated to qualifier round; y = clinched division title; z = clinched league title

GMHL
Team	Centre	W–L–T-OTL	GF–GA	Points
North Division
xy-South Muskoka Shield	Gravenhurst	36-5-0-1	277-117	73
x-Temiscaming Titans	Témiscaming, Qc	34-6-0-2	330-107	70
x-Almaguin Spartans	South River	34-7-0-1	267-107	69
x-Parry Sound Islanders	Seguin	32-9-0-1	288-147	65
x-Seguin Huskies	Seguin	19-20-0-3	206-160	41
x-Bracebridge Blues	Bracebridge	19-20-0-3	194-220	41
Sturgeon Falls Lumberjacks	Sturgeon Falls	11-25-0-1	196-244	17
x-Haliburton Wolves	Haliburton	9-32-0-1	177-336	19
q-Coldwater Falcons	Coldwater	9-32-0-1	156-338	19
q-Bobcaygeon Storm	Bobcaygeon	3-38-0-1	138-491	7
Central Division
xyz-Tottenham Steam	Tottenham	41-1-0-0	351-81	82
x-Alliston Coyotes	Alliston	36-5-0-1	328-110	73
x-Bradford Rattlers	Bradford	29-11-0-2	219-145	60
x-Bradford Bulls	Bradford	25-13-0-4	226-168	54
x-Oshawa Riverkings	Oshawa	25-15-0-2	228-201	52
x-Knights of Meaford	Meaford	24-16-0-2	226-185	50
x-Grey Highlands Bravehearts	Markdale	18-22-0-2	217-256	38
q-Orangeville Ice Crushers	Orangeville	16-24-0-2	194-217	34
q-Colborne Chiefs	Colborne	13-25-0-4	167-289	30
q-Shelburne Sharks	Shelburne	7-35-0-0	123-332	14
Grey County Grizzlies	Feversham	1-21-0-1	60-238	3
South Division
xy-Kingsville Kings	Kingsville	39-3-0-0	314-71	78
x-Toronto Attack	Toronto	33-7-0-2	253-94	68
x-Halton Ravens	Burlington	29-11-0-2	218-152	60
x-Niagara Whalers	Port Colborne	26-14-0-2	231-149	54
x-Komoka Dragons	Komoka	21-18-0-3	200-195	45
x-Toronto Predators	Toronto	20-21-1-0	157-164	41
x-London Lakers	London	19-22-0-1	183-219	39
q-Toronto Blue Ice Jets	Thornhill	18-22-1-1	151-196	38
q-North York Renegades	Toronto	7-31-0-4	118-242	18
q-Norfolk Vikings	Norfolk	4-38-0-0	98-336	8
Brantford Steelfighters	Brantford	2-16-0-0	28-131	4

Teams listed on the official league website.

Standings listed on official league website.

== 2016 Russell Cup Playoffs ==
Division Champion Round Robin

Team	W–L–OTL	GF	GA
Kingsville Kings (S)	3-0-1	21	9
Tottenham Steam (C)	2-2-0	14	14
Almaguin Spartans (N)	1-3-0	7	19

Russell Cup Play-in and Finals

Semifinal			Final
			1	Kingsville	3
2	Tottenham	7	2	Tottenham	4
3	Almaguin	2

=== North Division ===
Division Quarterfinals
1	South Muskoka	3
8	Coldwater	0
4	Parry Sound	3
5	Seguin	0
2	Temiscaming	3
7	Haliburton	0
3	Almaguin	3
6	Bracebridge	1

Division Semifinals
1	South Muskoka	3
4	Parry Sound	2
2	Temiscaming	1
3	Almaguin	3

Division Finals
1	South Muskoka	2
3	Almaguin	4

=== Central Division ===
Division Quarterfinals
1	Tottenham	3
9	Colborne	0
3	Brd. Rattlers	1
6	Meaford	3
2	Alliston	3
7	Grey Highlands	0
4	Brd. Bulls	0
5	Oshawa	3

Division Semifinals
1	Tottenham	3
6	Meaford	0
2	Alliston	3
5	Oshawa	1

Division Finals
1	Tottenham	4
2	Alliston	0

=== South Division ===
Division Quarterfinals
1	Kingsville	3
9	North York	0
4	Niagara	3
5	Komoka	0
2	Tor. Attack	3
7	London	0
3	Halton	3
6	Tor. Predators	0

Division Semifinals
1	Kingsville	3
4	Niagara	0
2	Tor. Attack	2
3	Halton	3

Division Finals
1	Kingsville	4
3	Halton	0

=== 8th Place Qualifiers ===
North Division

Finals
8	Coldwater	7
9	Bobcaygeon	4

Central Division

Semifinal			Final
			8	Orangeville	3
9	Colborne	8	9	Colborne	5
10	Shelburne	4

South Division

Semifinal			Final
			8	Tor. Blue Ice Jets	1
9	North York	1	9	North York	5
10	Norfolk	0

Playoff results are listed on the official league website.

== Scoring leaders ==
Note: GP = Games played; G = Goals; A = Assists; Pts = Points; PIM = Penalty minutes

Player / Team / GP / G / A / Pts / PIM

== Leading goaltenders ==
Note: GP = Games played; Mins = Minutes played; W = Wins; L = Losses: OTL = Overtime losses; SL = Shootout losses; GA = Goals Allowed; SO = Shutouts; GAA = Goals against average

Player	Team	GP	Mins	W	L	T	GA	SO	Sv%	GAA
Wes Werner	Kingsville Kings	11	600	9	0	0	12	3	0.942	1.20
Jan Pechek	Kingsville Kings	27	1515	24	2	0	44	2	0.951	1.74
Sebastien Demassa-Carlson	Almaguin Spartans	15	862	12	2	0	27	1	0.937	1.88
Andreas Morger	Temiscaming Titans	15	830	11	2	0	26	1	0.929	1.88
Denny Dubblestyne	Tottenham Steam	13	820	13	0	0	27	3	0.936	1.98

== Awards ==
- Top Scorer: Matt Fischer (Tottenham Steam)
- Most Valuable Player: Slava Chegrintcev (Alliston Coyotes)
- Rookie of the Year: Kyle Challis (Bracebridge Blues)
- Top Forward: Ludwig Niederbach (Kingsville Kings)
- Top Defenceman: Kevin Walker (Tottenham Steam)
- Top Goaltender: Jan Pechek (Kingsville Kings)
- Top Defensive Forward: Erik Erkers (Almaguin Spartans)
- Most Sportsmanlike Player: Graham Pickard (Tottenham Steam)
- Most Heart: Alfred Panelin-Borg (South Muskoka Shield)
- Top Coach: Jesse Cook (Toronto Attack)

== See also ==
- 2015 in ice hockey
- 2016 in ice hockey

Preceded by 2014–15 GMHL season	GMHL seasons	Succeeded by 2016–17 GMHL season
