= 2014–15 GMHL season =

- League: Greater Metro Junior A Hockey League
- Sport: Hockey
- Duration: Regular season 2014-09-05 – 2015-02-16; Playoffs; 2015-02-17 – 2015-03-27
- Teams: 22
- Finals champions: Temiscaming Titans

GMHL seasons
- 2013–14 2015–16

The 2014–15 GMHL season was the ninth season of the Greater Metro Junior A Hockey League (GMHL). The twenty teams of the GMHL played 42-game schedules.

Starting in February 2015, the top teams of the league played down for the Russell Cup, emblematic of the grand championship of the GMHL. Since the GMHL is independent from Hockey Canada and the Canadian Junior Hockey League, this is where the GMHL's season ended. The Temiscaming Titans defeated their division rival Seguin Huskies in the final series 4 games to 1 to win the Championship.

== Changes ==
- Expansion granted to the Cambridge Bears of Cambridge, Ontario.
- Lefroy Wave relocate to Markdale, Ontario and become Grey Highlands Bravehearts.
- Expansion granted to the Tottenham Steam of Tottenham, Ontario.
- Bobcaygeon Bucks leave league for CIHL.
- Mattawa Voyageurs relocate to South River, Ontario and become Almaguin Spartans.
- Expansion granted to the North York Renegades of Toronto, Ontario.
- Bracebridge Phantoms change name to Bracebridge Blues.
- Expansion granted to Niagara Whalers of Port Colborne, Ontario.
- Expansion granted to Downsview Spitfires of Toronto, Ontario, begin play in 2015.
- Powassan Eagles relocate to Parry Sound, Ontario and become Parry Sound Islanders.
- Shelburne Red Wings change name to Shelburne Stars and takes season off to restructure.

== Standings ==
Note: GP = Games played; W = Wins; L = Losses; OTL = Overtime losses; SL = Shootout losses; GF = Goals for; GA = Goals against; PTS = Points; x = clinched playoff berth; y = clinched division title; z = clinched conference title

North
Team	Centre	W–L–T-OTL	Points
North Division
Seguin Huskies	Humphrey	30-5-0-0	60
Temiscaming Titans	Temiscaming, QC	28-5-0-1	57
Parry Sound Islanders	Parry Sound	15-17-0-2	32
Almaguin Spartans	South River	12-21-0-2	26
Sturgeon Falls Lumberjacks	Sturgeon Falls	10-25-0-0	20
North-Central Division
South Muskoka Shield	Gravenhurst	28-6-0-0	56
Rama Aces	Rama	23-13-0-1	47
Grey Highlands Bravehearts	Markdale	14-17-0-3	31
Bracebridge Blues	Bracebridge	10-25-0-0	20
Knights of Meaford	Meaford	5-27-0-3	13
South
Team	Centre	W–L–T-OTL	Points
South Division
Toronto Attack	Toronto	30-6-0-2	62
Halton Ravens	Burlington	24-12-0-1	49
Niagara Whalers	Port Colborne	20-15-0-2	42
Toronto Predators	Toronto	8-22-0-3	19
Cambridge Bears	Cambridge	7-26-0-1	15
North York Renegades	Toronto	3-27-0-5	11
South-Central Division
Tottenham Steam	Tottenham	31-4-0-0	62
Toronto Blue Ice Jets	Thornhill	27-7-0-0	54
Bradford Rattlers	Bradford	27-8-0-0	54
Alliston Coyotes	Alliston	16-20-0-0	32
Orangeville Americans	Orangeville	8-23-0-2	18
Bradford Bulls	Bradford	8-24-0-1	17

Teams listed on the official league website.

Standings listed on official league website.

== 2015 Russell Cup Playoffs ==
Elimination Qualifiers Rd 1

Cambridge Bears 3 - North York Renegades 2
Orangeville Americans 6 - Bradford Bulls 5

Elimination Qualifiers Rd 2

Sturgeon Falls Lumberjacks 5 - Almaguin Spartans 4
Knights of Meaford 3 - Bracebridge Blues 0
Toronto Predators 5 - Cambridge Bears 3
Alliston Coyotes 11 - Orangeville Americans 3

Divisional Round

Temiscaming Titans defeated Sturgeon Falls Lumberjacks 3-games-to-none
Seguin Huskies defeated Parry Sound Islanders 3-games-to-none
South Muskoka Shield defeated Knights of Meaford 3-games-to-none
Rama Aces defeated Grey Highlands Bravehearts 3-games-to-2
Tottenham Steam defeated Alliston Coyotes 3-games-to-2
Toronto Blue Ice Jets defeated Bradford Rattlers 3-games-to-2
Toronto Attack defeated Toronto Predators 3-games-to-none
Halton Ravens defeated Niagara Whalers 3-games-to-1

Quarter-final

Temiscaming Titans defeated Rama Aces 3-games-to-none
Seguin Huskies defeated South Muskoka Shield 3-games-to-1
Halton Ravens defeated Tottenham Steam 3-games-to-2
Toronto Attack defeated Toronto Blue Ice Jets 3-games-to-none

Semi-final

Temiscaming Titans defeated Halton Ravens 4-games-to-3
Seguin Huskies defeated Toronto Attack 4-games-to-none

Final

Temiscaming Titans defeated Seguin Huskies 4-games-to-1

Playoff results are listed on the official league website.

== Scoring leaders ==
Note: GP = Games played; G = Goals; A = Assists; Pts = Points; PIM = Penalty minutes

Player / Team / GP / G / A / Pts / PIM

== Leading goaltenders ==
Note: GP = Games played; Mins = Minutes played; W = Wins; L = Losses: OTL = Overtime losses; SL = Shootout losses; GA = Goals Allowed; SO = Shutouts; GAA = Goals against average

Player / Team / GP / Mins / W / L / T / GA / SO / Sv% / GAA

== Awards ==
- Top Scorer: Ferdinando Colella (Tottenham)
- Most Valuable Player: Shane Bennett (Halton)
- Rookie of the Year: Zan Hobbs (Bradford Bulls)
- Top Forward: Curtis Warren (Temiscaming)
- Top Defenceman: Kevin Yandon (Toronto Blue Ice Jets)
- Top Goaltender: Craig Wood (Temiscaming)
- Top Defensive Forward: Brandon Case (Temiscaming)
- Most Sportsmanlike Player: Mikko Lindbom (Bradford Rattlers)
- Most Heart: Brad Ferrell (Orangeville)
- Top Coach: Frank De Masi (South Muskoka)

== See also ==
- 2014 in ice hockey
- 2015 in ice hockey

Preceded by 2013–14 GMHL season	GMHL seasons	Succeeded by 2015–16 GMHL season
