= 2016–17 GMHL season =

- League: Greater Metro Junior A Hockey League
- Sport: Hockey
- Duration: Regular season September 6, 2016 – February 16, 2017; Playoffs; February 15, 2017 – TBD
- Finals champions: Niagara Whalers

GMHL seasons
- 2015–16 2017–18

The 2016–17 GMHL season is the eleventh season of the Greater Metro Junior A Hockey League (GMHL). The teams of the GMHL played 42-game schedules.

In February 2017, the top teams of the league play for the Russell Cup, the playoff championship of the GMHL. Since the GMHL is independent from Hockey Canada and the Canadian Junior Hockey League, this is where the GMHL's season ends.

== League changes ==
Once all the membership changes were completed and the games were scheduled there were 28 teams. The league realigned then from three divisions to two 14-team North and South Divisions. By the start of the Russell Cup playoffs, there were 21 teams with 10 teams in the North Division and 11 teams in the South Division.

=== Expansion ===
- Expansion granted to Tillsonburg Hurricanes.
- Expansion granted to Lincoln Mavericks of Lincoln, Ontario.

=== Relocation or renamed ===
- Alliston Coyotes rebranded as New Tecumseth Civics after ownership change.
- Colbourne Chiefs rebranded as Northumberland Stars after ownership change.
- Grey Highlands Bravehearts relocated to Wiarton, Ontario as the Wiarton Rock.
- Shelburne Sharks re-brand as Shelburne Stars.
- Sturgeon Falls Lumberjacks returned to league. The team changed ownership and re-branded as the West Nipissing Lynx.

=== Folded ===
- During the previous season, the Brantford Steelfighters folded and was removed from the league schedule on November 5, 2015. The Steelfighters had their membership revoked at the end of the season.
- In March 2016, the league announced Bobcaygeon Storm, Coldwater Falcons, Grey County Grizzlies, and Haliburton Wolves were no longer league members.
- Shelburne Stars folded prior to the start of the season.
- Toronto Blue Ice Jets were removed from the schedule in the first week of the season.
- Bracebridge Blues were removed from the schedule after playing five games and forfeiting the sixth.
- Komoka Dragons folded on October 21 after playing 12 games.
- First year team, the Lincoln Mavericks, withdrew from the league on November 21.
- The Wiarton Rock folded mid-season on December 14.
- Orangeville Ice Crushers suspended operations in January. Three of the team's owners had been arrested for drug distribution in November 2016 and were suspended by the league. The league transferred control to another shareholder who ceased operations of the team after two months.

=== On hiatus ===
- The Norfolk Vikings chose to sit out the 2016–17 season.

== Standings ==
Note: GP = Games played; W = Wins; L = Losses; T = Tie; OTL = Overtime losses; GF = Goals for; GA = Goals against; PTS = Points; x = clinched playoff berth; q = relegated to qualifier round; y = clinched division title; z = clinched league title

GMHL
Team	Centre	W–L–OTL	GF–GA	Points
North Division
New Tecumseth Civics	Alliston, Ontario	37-5-0	252-101	74
Parry Sound Islanders	Parry Sound, Ontario	34-7-1	273-114	69
South Muskoka Shield	Gravenhurst, Ontario	26-10-6	248-142	58
Bradford Rattlers	Bradford, Ontario	28-14-0	254-185	56
Temiscaming Titans	Temiscaming, Quebec	27-15-0	221-163	54
Almaguin Spartans	South River, Ontario	24-15-3	167-154	51
Bradford Bulls	Bradford, Ontario	19-20-3	181-172	41
Knights of Meaford	Meaford, Ontario	18-21-3	191-176	39
West Nipissing Lynx	Sturgeon Falls, Ontario	13-28-1	184-268	27
Seguin Huskies	Humphrey, Ontario	13-28-1	153-290	27
Orangeville Ice Crushers	Orangeville, Ontario	7-26-0	108-210	14
Wiarton Rock	Wiarton, Ontario	1-24-1	69-243	3
Bracebridge Blues	Bracebridge, Ontario	0-6-0	15-71	0
South Division
Niagara Whalers	Port Colborne, Ontario	38-3-1	311-112	77
St. George Ravens	St. George, Ontario	33-7-2	287-122	68
Kingsville Kings	Kingsville, Ontario	29-8-5	239-148	63
North York Renegades	Toronto, Ontario	29-10-3	197-133	61
London Lakers	London, Ontario	26-12-4	221-175	56
Toronto Attack	Toronto, Ontario	22-20-0	207-195	44
Toronto Predators	Toronto, Ontario	19-17-6	174-201	44
Oshawa Riverkings	Oshawa, Ontario	14-25-3	154-249	31
Tottenham Steam	Tottenham, Ontario	11-28-3	161-303	25
Northumberland Stars	Colborne, Ontario	11-29-2	150-257	24
Tillsonburg Hurricanes	Tillsonburg, Ontario	10-30-2	154-300	22
Lincoln Mavericks	Beamsville, Ontario	3-13-3	57-101	9
Komoka Dragons	Komoka, Ontario	3-10-0	60-70	6

Teams listed on the official league website.

Standings listed on official league website.

Teams in gray folded midseason.

== 2017 Russell Cup playoffs ==
Division Quarter-finals	Division Semi-finals
N1	New Tecumseth	3
N8	Meaford	0
N1	New Tecumseth	3
N5	Temiscaming	1
N2	Parry Sound	3
N7	Brd. Bulls	0
North Division
N3	South Muskoka	3
N6	Almaguin	2
N2	Parry Sound	3
N3	South Muskoka	1
N4	Brd. Rattlers	1
N5	Temiscaming	3
Note: Pairings are re-seeded after the first round.
S1	Niagara	3
S8	Oshawa	0
S1	Niagara	3
S4	North York	0
S2	St. George	3
S7	Tor. Predators	0
South Division
S3	Kingsville	3
S6	Tor. Attack	0
S2	St. George	3
S3	Kingsville	0
S4	North York	3
S5	London	1

Division Finals
N1	New Tecumseth	3
N2	Parry Sound	4
S1	Niagara	4
S2	St. George	0

Russell Cup
N2	Parry Sound	0
S1	Niagara	4

=== 8th Place Qualifiers ===
North Division

Round 1			Round 2
			N8	Meaford	8
N9	West Nipissing	6	N9	West Nipissing	0
N10	Seguin	5

South Division

Round 1
S8	Oshawa	5
S11	Tillsonburg	3
S9	Tottenham	5
S10	Northumberland	3

Round 2
S8	Oshawa	8
S9	Tottenham	0

Playoff results are listed on the official league website.

== Scoring leaders ==
Note: GP = Games played; G = Goals; A = Assists; Pts = Points; PIM = Penalty minutes

Player / Team / GP / G / A / Pts / PIM

== Leading goaltenders ==
Note: GP = Games played; Mins = Minutes played; W = Wins; L = Losses: OTL = Overtime losses; SL = Shootout losses; GA = Goals Allowed; SO = Shutouts; GAA = Goals against average

Player / Team / GP / Mins / W / L / T / GA / SO / Sv% / GAA

== Awards ==
- Top Scorer: Carl Lyden (South Muskoka Shield)
- Most Valuable Player: North — Stepan Timofeyev (Bradford Rattlers); South — Manny Manns (Niagara Whalers)
- Rookie of the Year: North — Zach Lefebvre (Temiscaming Titans); South — Noah Battaglia (Toronto Predators)
- Top Forward: North — Carl Lyden (South Muskoka Shield); South — Regan Yew (London Lakers)
- Top Defenceman: North — Zakk Bekolay (Bradford Bulls); South — Zach Wright (Oshawa Riverkings)
- Top Goaltender: North — TJ Sherwood (New Tecumseth Civics); South — Ryan Purcell (St. George Ravens)
- Top Defensive Forward: North — Carmine Vietri (New Tecumseth Civics); South — Blake Naida (Kingsville Kings)
- Most Sportsmanlike Player: North — Tom Stanislavski (Almaguin Spartans); South — Brody Dyck (Northumberland Stars)
- Most Heart: North — Connor Annett - (Knights of Meaford); South — Ryan Dasilva (Tottenham Steam)
- Top Coach: North — Doug Raymond (Parry Sound Islanders); South — Ryan Ramsay (North York Renegades)

== See also ==
- 2016 in ice hockey
- 2017 in ice hockey

Preceded by 2015–16 GMHL season	GMHL seasons	Succeeded by 2017–18 GMHL season
