= 2013–14 GMHL season =

- League: Greater Metro Junior A Hockey League
- Sport: Hockey
- Duration: Regular season 2013-09-05 – 2014-02-16; Playoffs; 2014-02-17 – 2014-03-26
- Teams: 20
- Finals champions: Bradford Bulls

GMHL seasons
- 2012–13 2014–15

The 2013–14 GMHL season was the eighth season of the Greater Metro Junior A Hockey League (GMHL). The twenty teams of the GMHL played 42-game schedules.

Starting in February 2014, the top teams of the league played down for the Russell Cup, emblematic of the grand championship of the GMHL. Since the GMHL is independent from Hockey Canada and the Canadian Junior Hockey League, this is where the GMHL's season ended.

In the end, second year team Bradford Bulls defeated the defending champion Bradford Rattlers in the "Sidewalk Series" 4-games-to-1 to win their first ever Russell Cup as GMHL playoff champions.

== Changes ==
- Toronto Canada Moose are renamed Toronto Blue Ice Jets
- Expansion granted to Halton Ravens of Burlington, Ontario
- Expansion granted to Knights of Meaford of Meaford, Ontario
- Expansion granted to Toronto Predators of Toronto
- Expansion granted to Seguin Huskies of Humphrey, Ontario
- Expansion granted to Alliston Coyotes of Alliston, Ontario

== Final standings ==
Note: GP = Games played; W = Wins; L = Losses; OTL = Overtime losses; SL = Shootout losses; GF = Goals for; GA = Goals against; PTS = Points; x = clinched playoff berth; y = clinched division title; z = clinched conference title

North
Team	Centre	W–L–OTL	GF–GA	Points
Seguin Huskies	Humphrey	39-1-2	295-106	80
Temiscaming Titans	Temiscaming, QC	34-5-3	298-119	71
South Muskoka Shield	Gravenhurst	33-6-3	324-152	69
Rama Aces	Rama	24-18-0	231-211	48
Bracebridge Phantoms	Bracebridge	19-19-4	199-221	42
Mattawa Voyageurs	Mattawa	16-24-2	185-279	34
Powassan Eagles	Powassan	14-27-1	155-253	29
Bobcaygeon Bucks	Bobcaygeon	11-27-4	169-290	26
Sturgeon Falls Lumberjacks	Sturgeon Falls	6-34-2	130-321	14
South
Team	Centre	W–L–OTL	GF–GA	Points
Bradford Bulls	Bradford	32-6-4	226-109	68
Toronto Blue Ice Jets	Thornhill	32-9-1	304-150	65
Bradford Rattlers	Bradford	30-8-4	230-116	64
Alliston Coyotes	Alliston	30-10-2	239-158	62
Orangeville Americans	Orangeville	25-15-2	239-201	52
Toronto Attack	Toronto	24-15-3	218-144	51
Halton Ravens	Burlington	20-21-1	178-176	41
Knights of Meaford	Meaford	18-22-2	197-254	38
Toronto Predators	Toronto	5-34-3	91-247	13
Lefroy Wave	Lefroy	5-34-3	121-274	13
Shelburne Red Wings	Shelburne	3-37-2	124-372	8

Teams listed on the official league website.

Standings listed on official league website.

== 2013-14 Russell Cup Playoffs ==
Playoff results are listed on the official league website.

Preliminary
N1	Seguin	3
N8	Bobcaygeon	0
N4	Rama	3
N5	Bracebridge	2
S2	Tor. Jets	3
S7	Halton	0
S3	Brd. Rattlers	3
S6	Tor. Attack	0
N2	Temiscaming	3
N7	Powassan	0
N3	South Muskoka	3
N6	Mattawa	0
S1	Brd. Bulls	3
S8	Meaford	0
S4	Alliston	3
S5	Orangeville	1

Quarter-final
N1	Seguin	3
N4	Rama	0
S2	Tor. Jets	1
S3	Brd. Rattlers	3
N2	Temiscaming	3
N3	South Muskoka	2
S1	Brd. Bulls	3
S4	Alliston	0

Semi-final
N1	Seguin	0
S3	Brd. Rattlers	4
N2	Temiscaming	0
S1	Brd. Bulls	4

Russell Cup Final
S3	Brd. Rattlers	1
S1	Brd. Bulls	4

=== Qualifier ===
Single game elimination for eighth seeds of North and South Divisions.

==== North ====
Qualifier Rd
N8	Bobcaygeon	9
N9	Sturgeon Falls	8

==== South ====
Rd 1
S8	Meaford	16
S11	Shelburne	7
S9	Tor. Predators	5
S10	Lefroy	3

R2
S8	Meaford	9
S9	Tor. Predators	3

== Scoring leaders ==
Note: GP = Games played; G = Goals; A = Assists; Pts = Points; PIM = Penalty minutes

Player	Team	GP	G	A	Pts	PIM
Donny Danroth	South Muskoka	39	45	84	129	129
Andrey Novikov	South Muskoka	40	65	58	123	38
Tomi Taavitsainen	Brd. Bulls	40	57	58	115	101
Chris Brown	Alliston	39	27	81	108	40
Phillip Koufis	Bobcaygeon	42	40	55	95	55
Filip Sedivy	Alliston	42	31	64	95	58
Ryder Murray	Temsicaming	40	30	64	94	65
Ryan Brain	Rama	40	48	42	90	120
Connor Scott	Seguin	42	28	62	90	68
Gordy Bonnel	Alliston	40	47	40	87	94

== Leading goaltenders ==
Note: GP = Games played; Mins = Minutes played; W = Wins; L = Losses: OTL = Overtime losses; SL = Shootout losses; GA = Goals Allowed; SO = Shutouts; GAA = Goals against average

Player	Team	GP	Mins	W	L	GA	SO	Sv%	GAA
Martin Kysa	Seguin	24	1376	19	3	53	4	0.939	2.31
Dominic Nyffeler	Brd. Rattlers	25	1550	18	7	56	5	0.936	2.17
Jonathan D'Onofrio	Temiscaming	14	756	12	0	23	5	0.933	1.83
Sergey Bolshakov	Brd. Bulls	24	1465	15	9	60	3	0.932	2.46
Donovan Auger	Tor. Attack	18	1004	11	7	51	0	0.926	3.05

== Awards ==
- Top Scorer: Don Danroth (South Muskoka)
- Most Valuable Player: Tomi Taavitsainen (Bradford Bulls)
- Rookie of the Year: Sergey Bolshakov (Bradford Bulls)
- Top Forward: Tomi Taavitsainen (Bradford Bulls)
- Top Defenceman: Derek Van Ness (Alliston)
- Top Goaltender: Sergey Bolshakov (Bradford Bulls)
- Top Defensive Forward: Brandon Luksa (South Muskoka)
- Most Sportsmanlike Player: Joel Ahlin (Temiscaming)
- Most Heart: Michel Dumont (Sturgeon Falls)
- Top Coach: Gary Astalos (Seguin)

== See also ==
- 2013 in ice hockey
- 2014 in ice hockey

Preceded by 2012–13 GMHL season	GMHL seasons	Succeeded by 2014–15 GMHL season
