= Thornhill Thunderbirds =

Ice hockey team in Ontario, Canada

Toronto Flyers
- City: Thornhill, Ontario
- League: Mid-Ontario Jr. B/ Central Jr. B Greater Metro Junior A Hockey League
- Home arena: Paramount Thornhill Arena
- Colours: Orange, Black, and White
- General manager: Bill Lochhead
- Head coach: Bill Lochhead

Franchise history
- 1975-1984: Thornhill Thunderbirds
- 2021-2023: Streetsville Flyers
- 2023-present: Toronto Flyers

The Toronto Flyers are a Canadian Junior ice hockey team from Thornhill, Ontario. They played in the Greater Metro Junior A Hockey League. They returned junior back to Thornhill when the Streetville Flyers re-located to play out of the Paramount Thornhill Arena.

== History ==
The Thornhill Thunderbirds were a Canadian Junior "B" ice hockey team from Thornhill, Ontario. They played in the Central Junior B Hockey League.[1] The Thornhill Thunderbirds were a junior hockey team in Ontario. The team existed in two phases. The first was a Junior B team that started in the Mid-Ontario Junior B league. After the league folded in 1978, the team moved to the Central Junior B league, where it folded after the 1984 season.

A second Thornhill Thunderbirds team is now known as the Mississauga Chargers. Hockey returned to Thornhill in 1988, when the Metro Junior B Richmond Hill Dukes moved to Thornhill again assuming the Thunderbirds nickname. In 1990 that team merged with the Markham Connection (which had been known as the Markham Travelways from 1983 until 1989), and for one year were named the Markham Thunderbirds. In 1991 they returned to their Thornhill Thunderbirds name for one season. In 1992, they moved to Mississauga.

== Thornhill Thunderbirds Junior "B" ==
Season	GP	W	L	T	OTL	GF	GA	P	Results	Playoffs
1975-76	36	7	23	6	-	131	218	20	7th MOJBHL	
1976-77	40	20	17	3	-	207	198	43	2nd MOJBHL	Lost Final
1977-78	32	14	15	3	-	171	196	31	3rd MOJBHL	
1978-79	44	14	22	8	-	--	--	36	8th CJBHL	
1979-80	44	14	28	2	-	196	263	30	10th CJBHL	
1980-81	44	18	24	2	-	242	272	38	8th CJBHL	
1981-82	40	20	16	4	-	226	185	44	5th CJBHL	
1982-83	42	14	23	5	-	189	211	33	6th CJBHL	
1983-84	40	9	27	4	-	151	244	22	9th CJBHL	
Streetsville Flyers
2021-22	38	12	26	0	0	156	189	24	7th of 9 South DivL; 19th of 26 GMJHL	Lost Div quarter-final 0-2 (North York Renegades)
2022-23	42	8	34	0	0	99	244	16	8th of 9 South DivL; 21st of 26 GMJHL	Lost Div quarter-final 1-2 (North York Renegades)
Toronto Flyers
2023-24	42	6	35	0	1	98	242	13	8th of 8 South DivL; 14th of 15 GMJHL	Lost Div quarter-final 0-2 (North York Renegades)
2024-25	42	19	18	0	5	175	184	43	4th of 8 South DivL; 14th of 15 GMJHL	Lost Div quarter-final 0-2 (Tottenham Railers)
2025-26	42	12	26	0	4	111	199	28	6th of 8 South DivL; 11th of 14 GMJHL	Lost Div quarter-final 0-2 (Niagara Predators)
