= Bradford Bulls (disambiguation) =

The Bradford Bulls are a rugby league club from Bradford, West Yorkshire, England.

Bradford Bulls may also refer to:

- Bradford Bulls (ice hockey), a junior hockey team from Bradford, Ontario, Canada
- Bradford Rattlers, a junior hockey team known as the Bradford Bulls from 1988 to 2006
