= Joe Murphy (ice hockey) =

Canadian ice hockey player (born 1967)

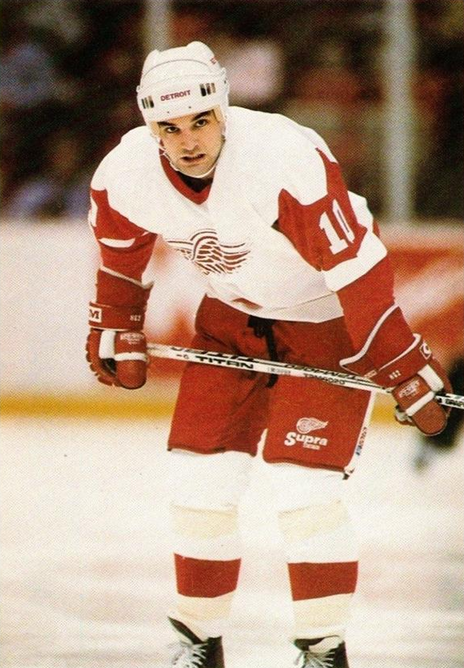
- Born: October 16, 1967 (age 58) London, Ontario, Canada
- Height: 6 ft 2 in (188 cm)
- Weight: 200 lb (91 kg; 14 st 4 lb)
- Position: Right wing
- Shot: Left
- Played for: Detroit Red Wings; Edmonton Oilers; Chicago Blackhawks; St. Louis Blues; San Jose Sharks; Boston Bruins; Washington Capitals
- NHL draft: 1st overall, 1986; Detroit Red Wings
- Playing career: 1986–2001

Joseph Patrick Murphy (born October 16, 1967) is a Canadian former professional ice hockey player who was chosen first overall in the 1986 NHL entry draft. Murphy won Calder Cup and NCAA championships before reaching the NHL.

Although Murphy struggled to make the expected impact after being selected first overall by the Detroit Red Wings, he was traded to the Edmonton Oilers in 1989. His production began to increase significantly in the 1990 playoffs to help Edmonton win their fifth Stanley Cup in seven seasons, and this success continued through his time in Edmonton. A contract dispute led to a trade to the Chicago Blackhawks in 1993, where he remained very productive. Murphy's later years were spent with the St. Louis Blues, San Jose Sharks, Boston Bruins, and Washington Capitals.

== Playing career ==
=== Detroit Red Wings ===
Joe Murphy became the first NCAA college player to be selected first overall when he was selected in the 1986 NHL entry draft by the Detroit Red Wings. Murphy had been a stand out centre with Michigan State, but with Steve Yzerman and Adam Oates handling the first and second line duties in Detroit, Murphy found little room to develop his game with the Red Wings. He spent the bulk of his rookie pro season in the American Hockey League with the Wings farm club in Adirondack.

The following season Murphy split time between the AHL and the NHL playing fifty games with Detroit after converting to right wing. He managed just ten goals and 19 points and ended up back in the minor leagues for the majority of the 1988–89 season where he really found his game putting up 31 goals and 66 points in just 47 games. That spring Murphy played a key role for the Adirondack Red Wings capturing the Calder Cup to complete his breakout pro season. The next season, 1989–90, Murphy scored three goals in the first nine games of the season for the Red Wings. He was then shipped to the Edmonton Oilers as part of a blockbuster six-player trade that landed Jimmy Carson and Kevin McClelland with the Red Wings and sent Murphy, Adam Graves, Petr Klíma and Jeff Sharples to Edmonton.

=== Edmonton Oilers and Chicago Blackhawks ===
With the Oilers, Murphy joined a young and up-and-coming core, but his development seemed to stall with just seven goals and 25 points in 62 games. However, that spring, in the playoffs, he found another gear. Coach John Muckler put Murphy with Adam Graves and Martin Gelinas on a line dubbed the "Kid Line" (Murphy and Graves were 21 while Gelinas was just 19) where he enjoyed great success, putting up 14 points in 22 playoff games and providing solid secondary scoring for the Oilers en route to a Stanley Cup triumph over the Boston Bruins. "They put our line together about the third game of the playoffs and all I recall is us just saying ‘Let’s go out there and work hard,’ Gelinas said of the 1990 Cup team. "Murph had a lot of skill and Gravy was the big, heavy guy. All three of us combined created a pretty good energy and a big buzz. We got some timely goals, but more importantly when we were on the ice we were just making things happen".

During a game the following season against the Detroit Red Wings, one of Murphy's former teammates, Shawn Burr, sent Murphy crashing into the boards with a hard check. Murphy's face hit the "dasher," the area where the glass met the boards at a 90-degree angle, at full speed. Despite the severity of the hit as well as massive bleeding from what he later claimed was a fractured skull, Murphy stayed in the game. During a shift in the second period, Murphy was racing down the ice on a breakaway, but his vision was so blurry that fired the puck into the glass in the corner rather than take a shot on net, leading a concerned teammate to grab him and pull him back to the bench.

Murphy built on this success the next year scoring 27 goals and 62 points then improved again the following year with career-best totals of 35 goals and 82 points. That spring Murphy led the surprising Oilers all the way to the Conference Finals where they fell to Chicago but Murphy's team leading 24 points in just 16 playoff games saw him finish fourth in post season scoring despite his team not playing in the final round. The breakthrough offensive totals came at the right time for Murphy whose contract expired following the season. Murphy and Oilers General Manager Glen Sather tried to work out a new contract through the summer with no success and ultimately broke off talks in September, before training camp with the two sides $300,000 apart. With Murphy holding out, the 1992–93 season went on with him working out with the Detroit Falcons of the Colonial Hockey League and awaiting a trade that wouldn't come until February.

Murphy was dealt to the Chicago Blackhawks and given a new three-year contract with an option year, joining the club for the final 19 games of the season, posting 7 goals and 17 points. His first full season in Chicago, the 1993–94 campaign, saw Murphy pot 31 goals and 70 points, which would prove to be his best year with the Blackhawks. The following year Murphy led the Hawks in goals with 23, and posted 41 points in 40 games in a lockout-shortened season.

In 1995–96 he scored 24 goals, just one more than the previous season despite playing 30 more games, and dipped to 51 points in 70 games, well off his point-a-game pace of the previous season. Perhaps more concerning was the fact he was one of only two forwards — the other being tough guy Jim Cummins — to finish the year with a negative plus/minus rating. With wingers Tony Amonte and Eric Daze eclipsing him as the primary scoring wings, Chicago did not renew his contract when it expired that spring.

=== St. Louis Blues and San Jose Sharks ===
On July 3, 1996, Murphy signed a 3-year, $10 million deal to join the St. Louis Blues but after scoring 20-goals and 45 points he fell short of the lofty expectations that came with his new contract. The next season, he posted just four goals and 13 points in 29 games before the Blues traded him to the San Jose Sharks for defensemen Todd Gill. Because of his large contract, the Blues also needed to send cash to San Jose in the transaction to get the deal done.

With the Sharks, Murphy rebounded and put up 9 points in ten games then led the team with 25 goals the following year and finished second on the team with 48 points. Despite his success, he left the team as a free agent in the off-season and was unable to find any takers.

=== Late career turmoil ===
The off-season came and went with Murphy not finding work before he eventually managed to land a try-out with the New York Rangers in November 1999. Rangers General Manager Neil Smith had been the GM of Adirondack when Murphy played for the club so the two had some history. However the tryout was very short lived as Murphy signed a contract with the Boston Bruins less than a week after beginning his try out with the Rangers. The Rangers, who weren't offered a chance to match the offer, felt spurned in the situation and Murphy made bizarre accusations about his sticks being partially sawed in half and one of his skates being "thrown in the river" by Smith.

Things in Boston didn't go much better for Murphy. He lasted just 26 games with the Bruins before the team suspended him indefinitely for "screaming profanities at coach Pat Burns." Murphy made few friends in the Bruins locker room and was said to have questioned his teammates' work ethic and was known to tell off both teammates and the coaching staff. "This has been going on for a while," Burns said at the time of the suspension. "The players have had enough and I have had enough." The Bruins, unable to find a team willing to trade for Murphy, placed the winger on waivers where he was claimed by the Washington Capitals.

With Washington, Murphy was given a very short leash. Team officials did their due diligence speaking with former coaches and teammates of Murphy before making the claim and General Manager George McPhee said if Murphy caused any issues with team he would be shipped out immediately. Murphy played 43 games with Washington over the next two years before ending his career on a particularly low note. Murphy, who had just one goal and six points in 14 games to start the 2000–01 season, was involved in an altercation in New York. After a team dinner and a trip to a night club, Murphy tried to talk a woman into joining him in a limo. She refused and a fight ensued which led to the woman's male companion striking Murphy in the head with a bottle.

The following day the Capitals demoted Murphy to their AHL affiliate, the Portland Pirates. When Murphy refused to report, the Capitals suspended him. He never played professional hockey again. Murphy tried — and failed — to file for workers compensation because the incident happened while he was traveling for work. The Department of Employment Services ruled that while Murphy was in New York for work reasons and the dinner was a team event, the bar Murphy traveled to after the dinner had nothing to do with his employment. Murphy appealed the decision and lost.

== Post-retirement life ==
In 2013, Murphy became the first coach and general manager of the GMHL Alliston Coyotes in their inaugural, 2013–14 season. However, he took a leave of absence from the team midway through the playoffs due to an undisclosed allegation which resulted in a Trespass Order issued against him by the Town of New Tecumseth, which includes Alliston. The order barred Murphy from all New Tecumseth recreation facilities, including the Coyotes' home rink, pending an Ontario Provincial Police investigation. On March 5, 2014, Murphy formally announced his resignation. While the OPP concluded there was nothing to investigate, the town's Trespass Order remained in place, making it all but impossible for Murphy to return.

In 2017, Murphy was living in Costa Rica. He ended up living on the streets and was eventually deported back to Canada.

On July 6, 2018, Murphy visited the studios of Q104 / KenoraOnline and DrydenNow to talk about his struggles with post-concussion symptoms, as well as his participation in the class action lawsuit with the NHL. He acknowledged that despite earning over $15 million during his NHL career, he was essentially homeless and destitute in Kenora, Ontario. Murphy further elaborated upon his situation in "Finding Murph", a SportsCentre feature that aired in August 2018. The segment's creators, Josh Shiaman, Rick Westhead, Stuart Roberts, Devon Burns and Michael Banani, received a Canadian Screen Award nomination for Best Sports Feature Segment at the 7th Canadian Screen Awards.

In October 2018, the Detroit Free Press reported that Murphy was still homeless in Kenora. The report stated that Murphy had spiraled into homelessness due to multiple concussions resulting in symptoms of frequent headaches, wild mood swings, and personality changes, including becoming an enforcer, starting to take drugs and alcohol. Murphy believed his decline started with Burr's hard check in 1991. That same month, the CTV News television program W5 produced a segment following two reporters from sister-network The Sports Network, as they looked in on Murphy, who admitted he had been living in shelters and tents around Ontario, where much of his earnings in the NHL had once been donated to various projects.

In March 2019, Murphy completed treatment through the Adult Mental Health Services (AMHS) live-in program at the Thunder Bay Regional Health Sciences Centre. In August 2019, USA Today reported Murphy was once again homeless in Kenora and "refusing help". In the summer of 2020, Murphy was living on the streets of Regina, Saskatchewan.

== Career statistics ==
=== Regular season and playoffs ===
			Regular season					Playoffs
Season	Team	League	GP	G	A	Pts	PIM	GP	G	A	Pts	PIM
1984–85	Penticton Knights	BCHL	51	68	84	152	92	—	—	—	—	—
1985–86	Michigan State University	CCHA	35	24	37	61	50	—	—	—	—	—
1986–87	Adirondack Red Wings	AHL	71	21	38	59	61	10	2	1	3	33
1986–87	Detroit Red Wings	NHL	5	0	1	1	2	—	—	—	—	—
1987–88	Adirondack Red Wings	AHL	6	5	6	11	4	—	—	—	—	—
1987–88	Detroit Red Wings	NHL	50	10	9	19	37	8	0	1	1	6
1988–89	Adirondack Red Wings	AHL	47	31	35	66	66	16	6	11	17	17
1988–89	Detroit Red Wings	NHL	26	1	7	8	28	—	—	—	—	—
1989–90	Detroit Red Wings	NHL	9	3	1	4	4	—	—	—	—	—
1989–90	Edmonton Oilers	NHL	62	7	18	25	56	22	6	8	14	16
1990–91	Edmonton Oilers	NHL	80	27	35	62	35	15	2	5	7	14
1991–92	Edmonton Oilers	NHL	80	35	47	82	52	16	8	16	24	12
1992–93	Chicago Blackhawks	NHL	19	7	10	17	18	4	0	0	0	8
1993–94	Chicago Blackhawks	NHL	80	31	39	70	11	6	1	3	4	25
1994–95	Chicago Blackhawks	NHL	40	23	18	41	89	16	9	3	12	29
1995–96	Chicago Blackhawks	NHL	70	22	29	51	86	10	6	2	8	33
1996–97	St. Louis Blues	NHL	75	20	25	45	69	6	1	1	2	10
1997–98	St. Louis Blues	NHL	27	4	9	13	22	—	—	—	—	—
1997–98	San Jose Sharks	NHL	10	5	4	9	14	6	1	1	2	20
1998–99	San Jose Sharks	NHL	76	25	23	48	73	6	0	3	3	4
1999–00	Boston Bruins	NHL	26	7	7	14	41	—	—	—	—	—
1999–00	Washington Capitals	NHL	29	5	8	13	53	5	0	0	0	8
2000–01	Washington Capitals	NHL	14	1	5	6	20	—	—	—	—	—
NHL totals			779	233	295	528	710	120	34	43	77	185

=== International ===
Year	Team	Event	GP	G	A	Pts	PIM
1986	Canada	WJC	7	4	10	14	2

== Awards and achievements ==
- 1985-86 - NCAA - NCAA Championship (Michigan State)
- 1988–89 - AHL - Calder Cup (Adirondack)
- 1989–90 - NHL - Stanley Cup (Edmonton)

Awards and achievements
Preceded by Paul Ysebaert	CCHA Rookie of the Year; 1985–86	Succeeded by Nelson Emerson
Preceded by Wendel Clark	NHL first overall draft pick 1986	Succeeded by Pierre Turgeon
Preceded by Brent Fedyk	Detroit Red Wings first-round draft pick 1986	Succeeded by Yves Racine
