= Niagara Predators =

- City: Niagara-on-the-Lake, Ontario
- League: Greater Metro Junior A Hockey League
- Division: South
- Founded: 2013
- Home arena: Meridian Credit Union Arena
- Colours: Blue, yellow, and white
- Owner: Robert Turnbull
- General manager: Robert Turnbull
- Head coach: Robert Turnbull

Franchise history
- 2013–2021: Toronto Predators
- 2021–present: Niagara Predators

The Niagara Predators are a Canadian junior ice hockey team based in Niagara-on-the-Lake, Ontario. They play in the Greater Metro Junior A Hockey League (GMHL).

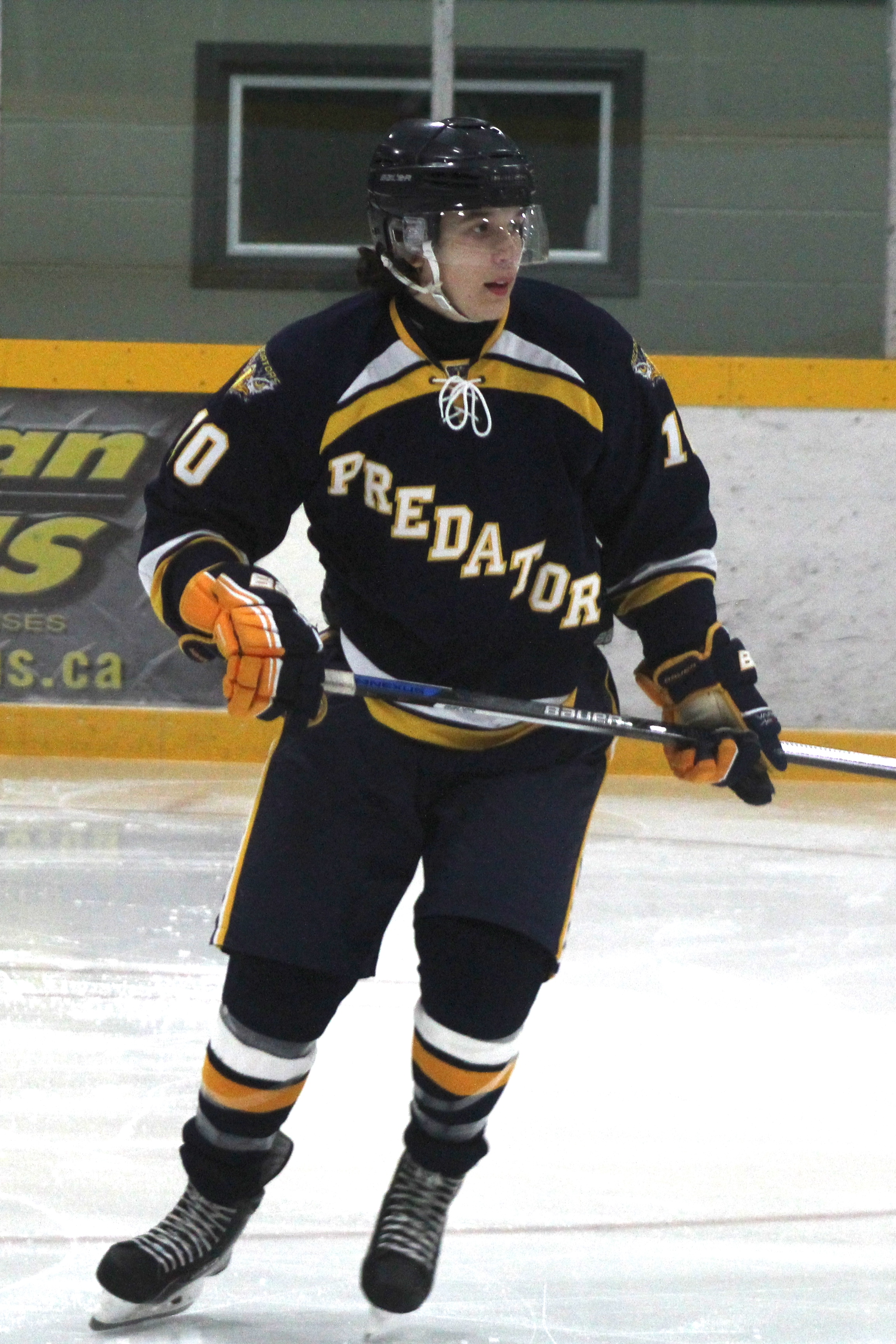
Predators defenceman Nikita Van during 2015–16 season

== History ==
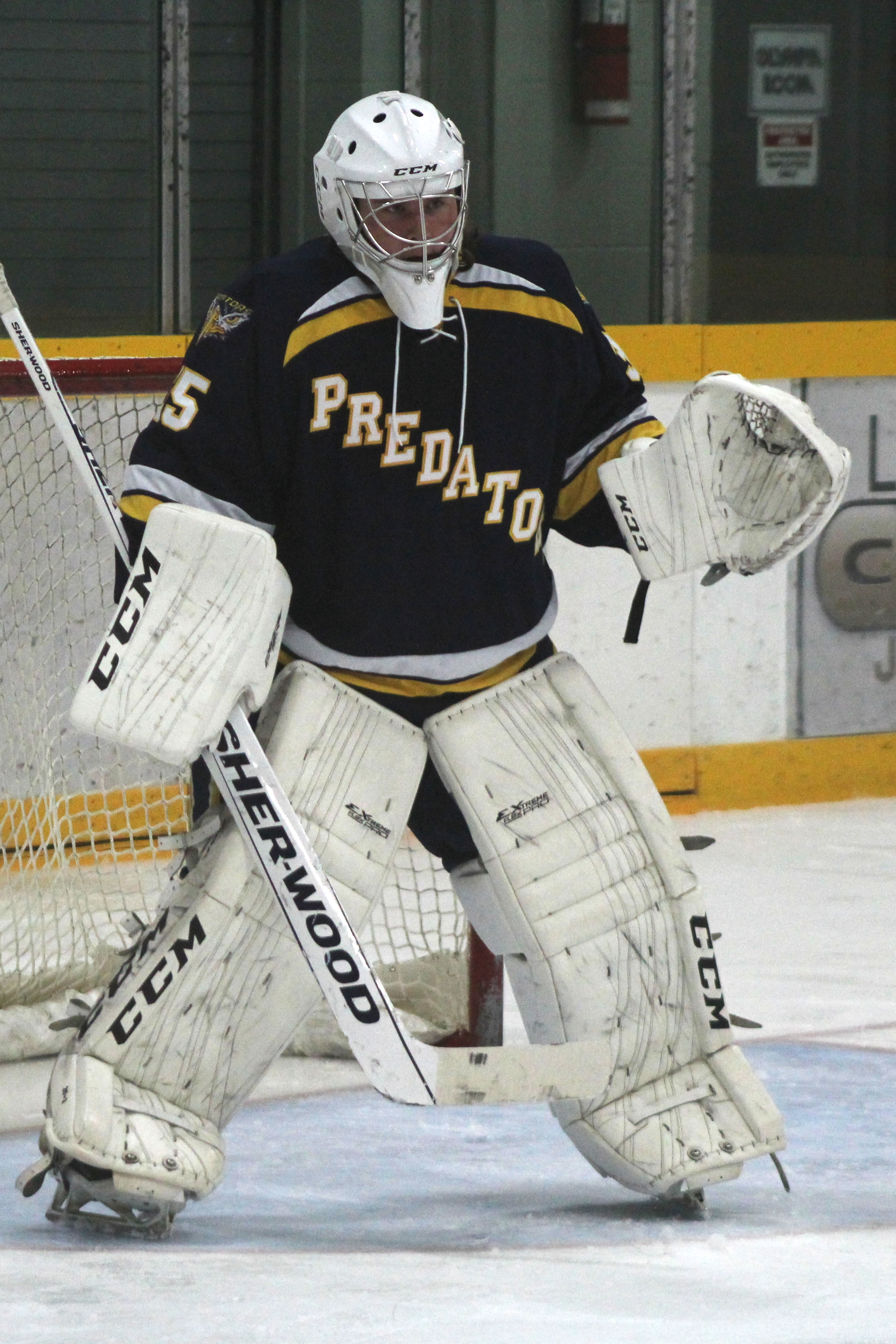
Predators goalie Brody Barbeau during 2015–16 season

The Toronto Predators joined the GMHL as an expansion franchise in February 2013. Founded by Allan Donnan, they called the historic Maple Leaf Gardens (now known as Mattamy Athletic Centre) home.

The Predators played their first game on September 7, 2013, at home, against the Orangeville Americans. Hockey Hall of Famers Ken Dryden and Darryl Sittler. Singer John McDermott did the opening puck drop, and the Americans won the game 4–2. Mitch Hebert scored the first goal in team history, just five seconds into the game, while goaltender Marc Villeneuve made 49 saves in a losing effort. On September 28, 2013, Robin Bonvin scored in overtime to give the Predators their first franchise victory. Playing on home ice, Marc Villeneuve made 58 saves in net, against the Knights of Meaford, in the 3–2 victory. Mitch Hebert scored a franchise record four goals on October 27, 2013, against the Powassan Eagles. Hebert was the first Predator to notch a hat trick.

After their inaugural season the Predators were taken over by Robert Turnbull. A longtime Hamilton Red Wings (1999–2014) general manager and team president, Turnbull took over from previous owner Allan Donnan (who also owned the Toronto Attack). Before the 2017–18 season, the Predators relocated their home games to Canlan Ice Sports – York in North York.

Following the 2020–21 season, which was cancelled due to the COVID-19 pandemic, the team relocated to Niagara-on-the-Lake for the 2021–22 season.

== Season-by-season standings ==
Season	GP	W	L	T	OTL	GF	GA	Pts	Regular season finish	Playoffs
2013–14	42	5	34	—	3	91	247	13	18th of 20, GMHL	Won qualifier round 1 game, 5–3 (Wave); Lost qualifier round 2 game, 3–9 (Knights)
2014–15	42	10	28	—	4	128	300	24	9th of 12, South Div. 16th of 22, GMHL	Won qualifier round 2 game, 5–3 (Bears); Lost div. semi-finals, 1–3 (Attack)
2015–16	42	20	21	1	0	157	164	41	6th of 10, South Div. 16th of 30, GMHL	Lost div. semi-finals, 0–3 (Ravens)
2016–17	42	19	17	0	6	174	201	44	7th of 11, South Div. 13th of 21, GMHL	Lost div. quarter-finals, 0–3 (Ravens)
2017–18	42	13	25	0	4	167	258	30	9th of 12, South Div. 17th of 21, GMHL	Won 1st elim. game, 5–3 (Lakers); Won 2nd elim game, 4–3 OT (Hurricanes); Won 8th pl. qualifier game, 9–4 (Riverkings); Lost div. quarter-finals, 0–2 (Ravens)
2018–19	42	11	28	0	3	154	219	25	11th of 12, South Div. 20th of 22, GMHL	Lost 1st elim. game, 3–5 (Steam)
2019–20	42	8	32	0	2	117	229	18	10th of 10, South Div. 23rd of 23, GMHL	Won 1st elim. game (Steam); Won 2nd elim. game, 4–1 (Aces); Lost div. quarter-finals, 0–2 (Ravens)
2020–21	Season lost due to COVID-19 pandemic									
Niagara-on-the-Lakes Predators
2021–22	38	28	9	0	1	200	111	57	3rd of 9, South Div. 5th of 19, GMHL	Won div. quarter-finals, 2-0 (Lakers); Lost div. semi-finals, 1-3 (Renegades)
Niagara Predators
2022–23	42	20	18	0	4	156	150	44	4th of 9, South Div. 7th of 16, GMHL	Won div. quarter-finals, 2-1 (Ravens); Lost div. semi-finals, 0-3 (Renegades)
2023–24	42	17	21	0	4	144	161	38	6th of 8, South Div. 11th of 15, GMHL	Lost div. quarter-finals, 0-2 (Roadrunners)
2024–25	42	15	24	0	3	141	158	33	6th of 9, South Div. 11th of 15, GMHL	Lost div. quarter-finals, 0-2 (Ravens)
2025–26	42	21	19	0	2	143	154	44	4th of 8, South Div. 7th of 14, GMHL	Won div. quarter-finals, 2-0 (Flyers); Lost div. semi-finals 0-3 (Roadrunners)
