= Knights of Meaford =

- City: Meaford, Ontario, Canada
- League: Greater Metro Junior A Hockey League
- Founded: 2013
- Home arena: Meaford & St. Vincent Community Centre
- Colours: Red, black, and white
- General manager: Nathan Parrish
- Head coach: Craig Cescon

The Knights of Meaford or the Meaford Knights are a Canadian junior ice hockey team based in Meaford, Ontario, Canada. They play in the Greater Metro Junior A Hockey League (GMHL).

== History ==
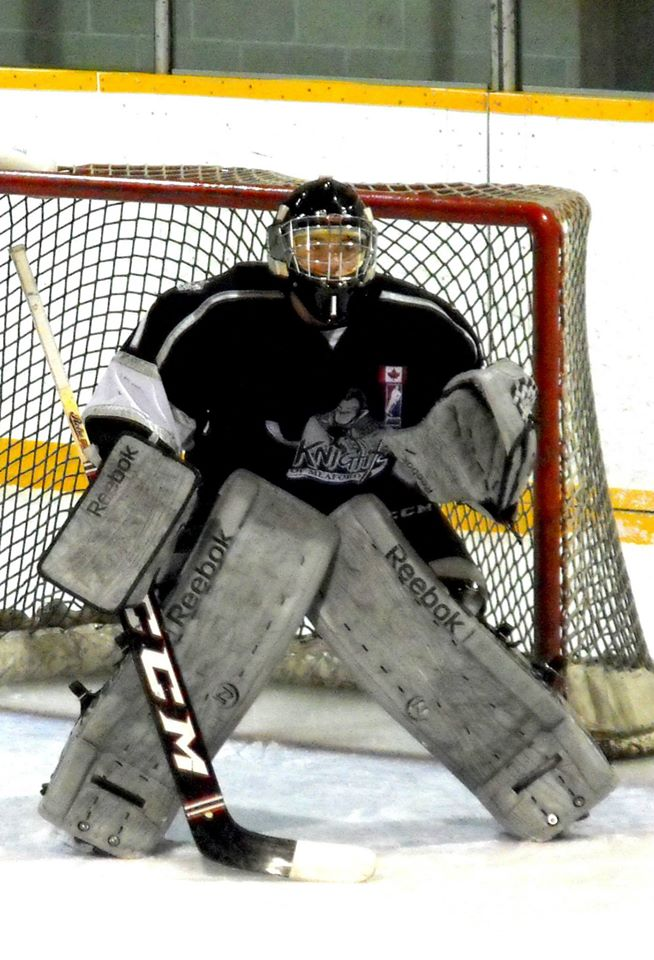
Knights goalie, Jaedon McConnell, during 2014 season.

The Knights of Meaford joined the GMHL in spring 2013. The Knights are the first junior team in Meaford since the Meaford Monarchs of the Mid-Ontario Junior C Hockey League in the late 1970s.

On September 8, 2013, the Knights traveled to Burlington, Ontario, to play their first game against the Halton Ravens. Despite trailing 6–3 in the second period, the Knights rallied to win the game 9–8. Zach Newman scored the first goal in team history at 3:52 of the first period. Jesse Martel picked up the win in net for the Knights. On October 17, 2013, the Knights played their first home game defeating the Lefroy Wave 5–3 in front of a sold out crowd. Connor Long picked up the eventual game-winning goal.

== Season-by-season standings ==
| Season | GP | W | L | T | OTL | GF | GA | Pts | Regular season finish | Playoffs |
|---|---|---|---|---|---|---|---|---|---|---|
| 2013–14 | 42 | 18 | 22 | — | 2 | 197 | 254 | 38 | 13th of 20, GMHL | Won 1st Rd. Qual. Gm, 16–7 (Red Wings); Won 2nd Rd. Qual. Gm, 9–3 (Predators); Lost Div Quarter-finals, 0–3 (Bulls) |
| 2014–15 | 42 | 8 | 30 | — | 4 | 132 | 262 | 12 | 5th of 10, North-Central Div. 20th of 22, GMHL | Lost Div Semi-finals, 0–3 (Shield) |
| 2015–16 | 42 | 24 | 16 | 0 | 2 | 226 | 185 | 50 | 6th of 10, Central Div. 14th of 30, GMHL | Won Div. Quarter-finals, 3–1 (Rattlers); Lost Div. Semi-finals, 0–3 (Steam) |
| 2016–17 | 42 | 18 | 21 | 0 | 3 | 191 | 176 | 39 | 8th of 11, North Div. 14th of 21, GMHL | Won 8th Pl. Qual. Game, 8–0 (Lynx); Lost Div. Quarter-finals, 0–3 (Civics) |
| 2017–18 | 42 | 22 | 15 | 0 | 5 | 207 | 164 | 49 | 5th of 9, North Div. 10th of 21, GMHL | Lost Div. Quarter-finals, 0–2 (Titans) |
| 2018–19 | 42 | 18 | 21 | 0 | 3 | 175 | 175 | 39 | 8th of 10, North Div. 16th of 22, GMHL | Won 8th Pl. Qualifying game, 6–1 (Shield); Lost Div. Quarter-finals, 0–2 (Rattlers) |
| 2019–20 | 42 | 12 | 29 | 0 | 1 | 149 | 204 | 25 | 10th of 10, North Div. 21st of 23, GMHL | Lost 9th Pl. Qualifying game, 4–6 (Shield) |
| 2020–21 | Lost season due to COVID-19 pandemic | | | | | | | | | |
| 2021–22 | 38 | 21 | 13 | 0 | 4 | 135 | 135 | 46 | 4th of 10, North Div. 8th of 18, GMHL | Lost Div. Quarter-finals, 0–2 (Pirates) |
| 2022–23 | 42 | 26 | 15 | 0 | 1 | 218 | 156 | 53 | 3rd of 7, North Div. 6th of 16, GMHL | Won Div. Quarter-finals, 2-0 (Shield); Lost Div. Semifinal, 1-3 (Pirates) |
| 2023–24 | 42 | 23 | 17 | 0 | 2 | 201 | 184 | 48 | 4th of 7, North Div. 6th of 15, GMHL | Lost Div. Quarter-finals, 1-2 (Titans) |
| 2024–25 | 42 | 24 | 14 | 0 | 4 | 193 | 158 | 52 | 5th of 6, North Div. 7th of 15, GMHL | Won Div. Quarter-finals, 2-0 (Lynx); Lost Div Semifinals 0-3 (Rattlers) |
| 2025–26 | 42 | 9 | 32 | 0 | 1 | 112 | 238 | 19 | 6th of 6, North Div. 13th of 14, GMHL | Lost Div. Quarter-finals, 0-2 (Lynx) |
