= Seguin Huskies =

- City: Humphrey, Ontario, Canada
- League: Greater Metro Junior A Hockey League
- Founded: 2013
- Folded: 2018
- Home arena: Humphrey Arena
- Colours: Black, burgundy, and white
- Owner(s): Jack Sports Group
- General manager: Martin Jansson (2015–16)
- Head coach: Doug Raymond (2017–18)
- Media: Moose FM / Metroland Media

The Seguin Huskies were a Canadian Junior ice hockey team based in Humphrey, Ontario, Canada. They played in the Greater Metro Junior A Hockey League (GMHL).

== History ==
The Seguin Huskies joined the GMHL in spring 2013. The Huskies are the first junior team in Humphrey since the Seguin Bruins of the Ontario Junior Hockey League folded in 2010.

On September 14, 2013, the Huskies played their first game as a franchise, traveling to Bracebridge, Ontario, to play the second year Bracebridge Phantoms. At 3:46 into the first period, Connor Scott scored the first goal in franchise history. Tanner Emerson made 28 saves to earn the team's first victory, a 15–3 romp of the Phantoms. On September 15, 2013, the Huskies played their first home game. They hosted and defeated the Phantoms 10–4. Kevin Munge scored the first home goal in team history along with totaling three goals and two assists on the night, while Tanner Emerson picked up the win with 36 saves. The Huskies finished their inaugural season 39–1–2.

In 2017, the team owners merged one of their other teams, the Parry Sound Islanders, into the Huskies for the 2017–18 season. The owners also made the Islanders' head coach Doug Raymond the new Huskies head coach. The next season, the Huskies were no longer listed as members of the GMHL.

== Season-by-season standings ==
Season	GP	W	L	T	OTL	GF	GA	Pts	Regular season finish	Playoffs
2013–14	42	39	1	—	2	295	106	80	1st of 20, GMHL	Won Div. Quarter-finals, 3–0 (Bucks); Won Div. Semi-finals, 3–0 (Aces); Lost League Semi-finals, 0–4 (Rattlers)
2014–15	42	34	7	—	1	319	97	69	2nd of 10, North Div. 5th of 22, GMHL	Won Div. Semi-finals, 3–0 (Islanders); Won Conf. Semi-finals, 3–1 (Shield); Won League Semi-finals, 4–0 (Attack); Lost League Finals, 1–4 (Titans)
2015–16	42	19	20	0	3	206	160	41	5th of 10, North Div. 17th of 30, GMHL	Lost Div. Quarter-finals, 0–3 (Islanders)
2016–17	42	13	28	0	1	153	290	27	10th of 10, North Div. 18th of 21, GMHL	Lost 1st Rd Qualifying Game, 5–6 (Lynx)
2017–18	42	9	32	0	1	161	251	19	9th of 9, North Div. 20th of 21, GMHL	Lost 8th Pl. Qualifying Game, 5–6 OT (Shield)
