= Tottenham Railers =

Canadian ice hockey team

- City: New Tecumseth, Ontario, Canada
- League: Greater Metro Junior A Hockey League
- Division: South
- Founded: 2014; 12 years ago
- Home arena: Tottenham Community and Fitness Centre
- Colours: White, navy, red
- Owner: Micheal Prock
- General manager: Micheal Prock (2023–present)
- Head coach: Micheal Prock (2025-present)

Franchise history
- 2014–2020: Tottenham Steam
- 2020–2023: Tottenham Thunder
- 2023–present: Tottenham Railers

The Tottenham Railers are a Canadian junior ice hockey team based in New Tecumseth, Ontario. They play in the Greater Metro Junior A Hockey League (GMHL). The team was known as the Tottenham Steam for its first six seasons and the Tottenham Thunder for the following three seasons.

== History ==
The Tottenham Steam joined the Greater Metro Junior A Hockey League (GMHL) in 2014. Their first general manager and head coach was Ryan Wood. The Steam played their first game, at home, on September 6, 2014. Hosting the Russell Cup champions Bradford Bulls, winning 7–5. The first goal in team history was scored by Brian Rupp after 3:44 into the first period.

Shortly after winning their first Russell Cup championship in 2016, the Tottenham Steam gained new owners in the DaSilva family. Cup-winning coach Ryan Wood left the team to take the same positions with the New Tecumseth Civics. The DaSilva's initially brought in Johan Moell as general manager and Jim Aldred as head coach for the 2016–17 season but would instead hire former NHL All-Star Dennis Maruk as head coach. However, Maruk had to take a leave of absence midseason and was replaced by Brandon Billie. For the 2017–18 season, the Steam brought in Matt Hamilton as head coach and general manager after previously coaching the Bradford Rattlers.

The 2018–19 season saw the Steam add Robert Babiak as general manager, coming off a season with the Port Huron Prowlers. Babiak would depart the team in January, with the team then trading away many of its key players. Following the 2018–19 season, the DaSilva's sold the team to new ownership, which retained Hamilton as general manager and head coach.

Following the 2019–20 season, Matt Hamilton becoming the sole owner of the team. The team briefly rebranded as the Tottenham Express for a fresh start in April 2020. Derek Robinson became head coach with Matt Hamilton acting as general manager and president. The 2020–21 season was delayed due to the COVID-19 pandemic restrictions and the team rebranded again as the Tottenham Thunder in November 2020.

For the 2023–24 season, ownership transitioned to Micheal Prock and Beth Prock and the team was branded as the Tottenham Railers, paying tribute to the former Steam name as well as Tottenham's railroading history. Vito Scaringi was named the first Railers coach in May 2023.

== Season-by-season standings ==
Season	GP	W	L	T	OTL	GF	GA	Pts	Regular season finish	Playoffs
2014–15	42	37	5	—	0	332	129	74	1st South-Central Div. 1st GMHL	Won Div. Round, 3–2 (Coyotes); Lost quarter-finals, 2–3 (Ravens)
2015–16	42	41	1	0	0	351	81	82	1st Central Div. 1st GMHL	Won Div. Quarter-finals, 3–0 (Chiefs); Won Div. Semi-finals, 3–0 (Knights); Won Div. Final, 4–0 (Coyotes); 2nd in Round Robin (2–2); Won Play-in Game, 7–2 (Spartans); Won Russell Cup Final, 4–3 (Kings)
2016–17	42	11	28	0	3	161	303	25	9th of 11, South Div. 19th of 21, GMHL	Won 1st Rd. Qualifier game, 5–3 (Stars); Lost 8th Place Qualifier game, 0–8 (Riverkings)
2017–18	42	13	27	0	2	184	267	28	11th of 12, South Div. 19th of 21, GMHL	Lost 1st Rd. Qualifier game, 2–8 (Hurricanes)
2018–19	42	14	23	0	5	164	229	33	10th of 12, South Div. 18th of 22, GMHL	Won 1st Rd. Qualifier game, 5–3 (Predators); Won 2nd Rd. Qualifier game, 3–2 (Stars); Won 8th Pl. Qualifying game, 4–3 (Riverkings); Lost div. quarter-finals, 0–2 (Ravens)
2019–20	42	9	30	0	3	135	278	21	9th of 10, South Div. 22nd of 23, GMHL	Lost 1st Rd. Qualifier game (Predators)
Tottenham Thunder
2020–21	Season lost due to COVID-19 pandemic									
2021–22	37	3	33	0	1	87	275	7	9th of 9, South Div. 19th of 19, GMHL	Won 1st Rd. Qualifier game (Aces); Lost div. quarter-finals, 0-2 (Roadrunners)
2022–23	42	14	27	0	1	152	241	29	7th of 9, South Div. 12th of 16, GMHL	Lost div. quarter-final, 0-2 (Roadrunners)
Tottenham Railers
2023–24	42	19	21	0	2	162	183	40	5th of 8, South Div. 10th of 15, GMHL	Lost div. quarter-final, 1-2 (Ravens)
2024–25	42	20	21	0	2	205	212	42	5th of 9, South Div. 10th of 15, GMHL	Won div. quarter-final, 2-0 (Flyers); Won Div Semis 3-2 (Stars); Lost Div Finals 0-4 (Renegades)
2025–26	42	19	22	0	1	193	200	39	5th of 9, South Div. 9th of 14, GMHL	Lost div. quarter-final, 0-2 (Pirates)

== Team captains ==
- Braedan Foote 2014–15
- Kevin Walker 2015–16
- Hayden Way 2016–17
- Alexander Andrews 2021–22
- Alex Fornari 22 end of season
- Alexander Andrews 22-23
