= Cambridge Bears =

- City: Cambridge, Ontario, Canada
- League: Greater Metro Junior A Hockey League
- Founded: 2014
- Operated: 2014–2015
- Home arena: Cambridge Sports Park
- Colours
- Owner(s): Cornerstone Sports Group
- Head coach: Ray Baumgaertner

The Cambridge Bears were a junior ice hockey team based in Cambridge, Ontario, Canada. The team was a member of the Greater Metro Junior A Hockey League during the 2014–15 season however they were pulled from the league by their owners. The club played their home games out of the Cambridge Sports Park.

== History ==
In July 2014, it was announced that Cornerstone Sports Group had been granted a franchise in the Greater Metro Junior A Hockey League (GMHL) for their Cambridge Bears team. The Bears were announced to play the 2014–15 season out of the Cambridge Sports Park. The Bears finished their debut regular season in twenty-first place overall and fifth in the South Division of the South Conference. All clubs advanced to the 2014–15 Russell Cup playoffs with the Bears being drawn against the North York Renegades in Round One of the sudden death Elimination Qualifiers. The Bears defeated the Renegades 3–2 and advanced to Round Two of the Elimination Qualifiers. The team was defeated by the Toronto Predators 5–3 in their sudden death game of Round Two, ending their playoff run. In June 2015, the Bears, along with Cornerstone's other franchise Halton Ravens, signed a partnership deal with the Federal Hockey League (FHL). The deal allows players from both teams to receive professional call-ups from any of the six teams in the FHL. A month later it was announced that Cornerstone Sports Group had withdrawn the Bears from the GMHL prior to the start of the 2015–16 season due to business reasons including ice time and the lack of quality of the team. The team was replaced in the market by four of Cornerstone's Griffins minor hockey teams which compete in the Ontario Rep Hockey League. The future of the Bears was under discussion to be sold or relocated but nothing ever came of it.

== Season-by-season results ==
Season	GP	W	L	OTL	PTS	GF	GA	Finish	Playoffs
2014–15	42	8	33	1	17	121	273	5th of 6, South Div. 21st of 22, GMHL	Won Round One Elimination Qualifier Game, 3–2(Renegades); Lost Round Two Elimination Qualifier Game, 3–5 (Predators)

== Personnel ==
=== Team captains ===
- Mackenzie Scott, 2014–15

=== Head coaches ===
- Ray Baumgaertner, 2014–15
