= Niagara Whalers =

- City: Port Colborne, Ontario, Canada
- League: Greater Metro Junior A Hockey League
- Founded: 2014; 12 years ago
- Operated: 2014–2020
- Folded: 2020; 6 years ago
- Home arena: Vale Health & Wellness Centre
- Colours
- General manager: Andrew Ferlatte
- Head coach: Terry Masterson (2016–17)
- Website: Niagarawhalershockey.com

The Niagara Whalers were a junior ice hockey team based in Port Colborne, Ontario, Canada. They are members of the South Division of the Greater Metro Junior A Hockey League (GMHL). The Whalers were founded in 2014 and joined the GMHL in the 2014–15 season. The club played their home games at the Vale Health & Wellness Centre.

== History ==
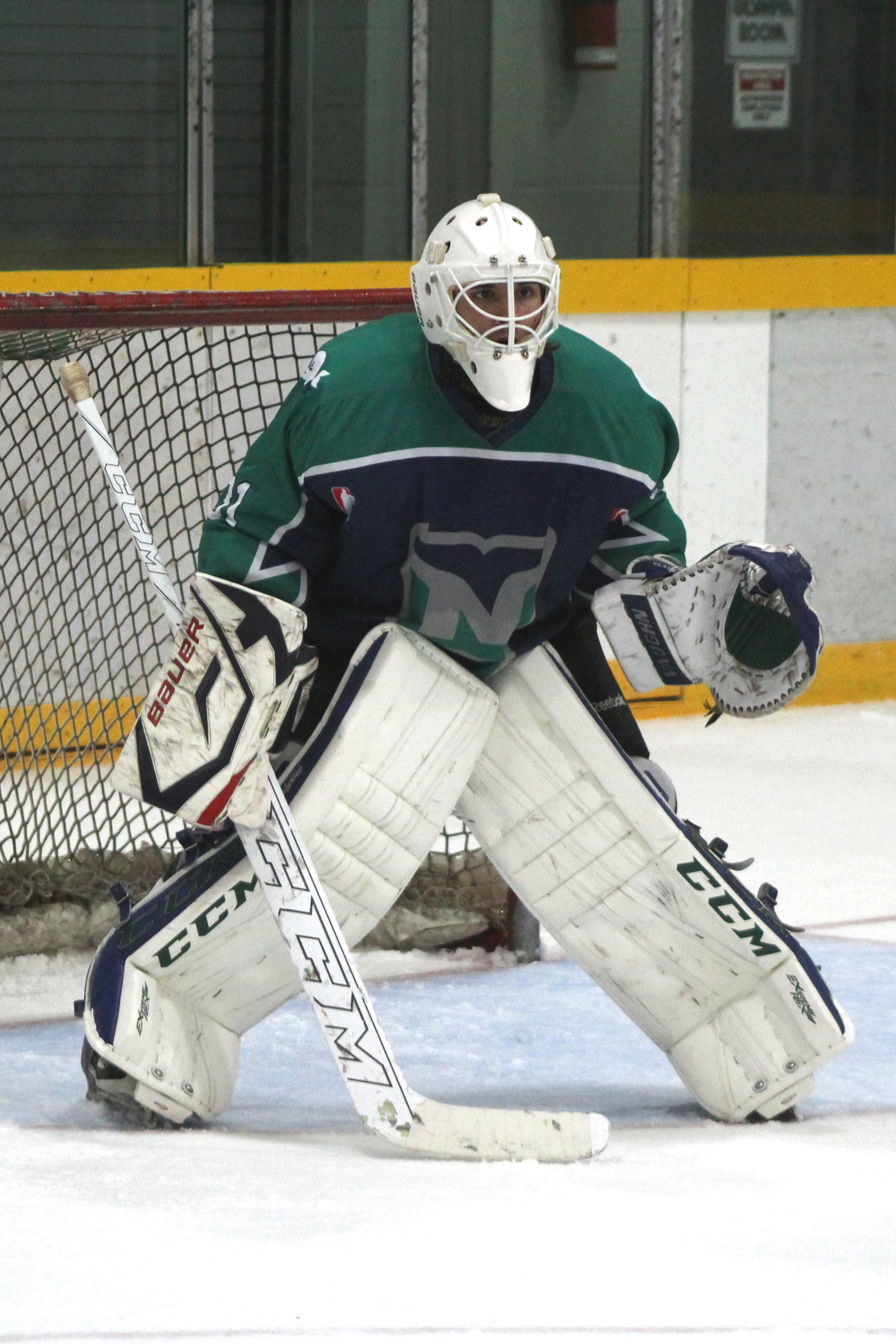
Whalers goalie during 2015–16 season.

In May 2014, the Whalers were granted a franchise in the Greater Metro Junior A Hockey League (GMHL) for the 2014–15 season. Prior to joining the GMHL, the Whalers competed as a showcase organization in Southern Ontario Bantam and Midget tournaments, winning nine of eleven tournaments. A prospects team will continue to compete in the showcase tournaments and will serve as an affiliate to the Junior A club. After being awarded a GMHL franchise, the Whalers were approved to play out of the Vale Health & Wellness Centre in Port Colborne, Ontario. The Whalers finished their debut regular season in tenth place overall and third in the South Division of the South Conference. The club advanced to Round One of the 2014–15 Russell Cup playoffs where they were drawn against the Halton Ravens. The Whalers were defeated by the Ravens three-games-to-one ending their playoff run. In 2015–16, the league realigned the teams into three divisions, North, Central and South. The Whalers finished the season in fourth place, defeated the Komoka Dragons in the first round in three straight games, before losing to the eventual division Champions in the division semifinals. In 2016–17, the league went back to the two conferences, North and South placing the Whalers in the 11 team South Division.

== Season-by-season results ==
Season	GP	W	L	T	OTL	GF	GA	PTS	Finish	Playoffs
2014–15	42	23	17	—	2	187	191	48	3rd of 12, South Div. 10th of 22, GMHL	Lost in Round One, 1–3 (Ravens)
2015–16	42	26	14	0	2	231	149	54	4th of 10, South Div. 11th of 30, GMHL	Won Div. Quarter-finals, 3–0 (Dragons); Lost Div. Semi-finals, 0–3 (Kings)
2016–17	42	38	3	0	1	311	112	77	1st of 11, South Div. 1st of 21, GMHL	Won Div. Quarter-finals, 3–0 (Riverkings); Won Div. Semi-finals, 3–0 (Renegades); Won Div. Finals, 4–0 (Ravens); Won League Finals, 4–0 (Islanders); Russell Cup Champions
2017–18	42	32	9	0	1	305	172	65	3rd of 12, South Div. 3rd of 21, GMHL	Won Div. Quarter-finals, 2–0 (Aces); Won Div. Semi-finals, 3–0 (Kings); Lost Div. Finals, 2–4 (Ravens)
2018–19	42	21	20	0	1	227	248	43	6th of 12, South Div. 11th of 22, GMHL	Won Div. Quarter-finals, 2–1 (Aces); Lost Div. Semi-finals, 1–3 (Ravens)
2019–20	42	30	10	0	2	264	132	62	2nd of 10, South Div. 3rd of 23, GMHL	Won Div. Quarter-finals, 2–0 (Roadrunners); Won Div. Semi-finals, 3–0 (Renegades); Trailed Div. Finals, 1–2 (Ravens); Postseason cancelled due to COVID-19 pandemic

== Head coaches ==
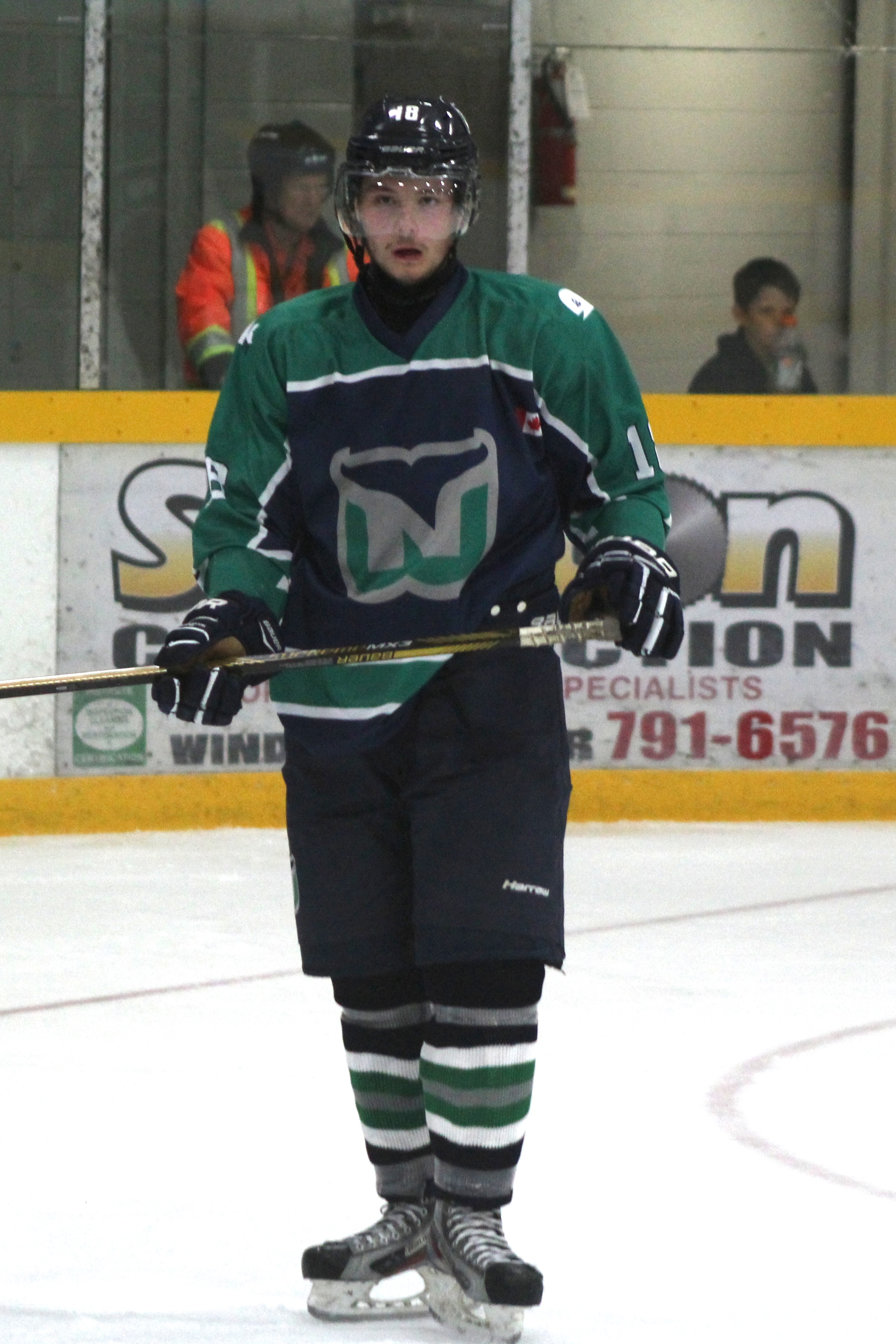
Whalers skater during 2015–16 season.

- Andrew Joyner, 2014–15
- Bryan Elliott, 2015–16
- Terry Masterson, 2016–
