= Toronto Attack =

- City: Toronto, Ontario, Canada
- League: Greater Metro Junior A Hockey League
- Operated: 2012–2017
- Home arena: Canlan Ice Sports – York
- Colours: Black, red and white

The Toronto Attack was a junior ice hockey team based in Toronto, Ontario, Canada. It played in the Greater Metro Junior A Hockey League (GMHL).

== History ==
The Attack was announced as an expansion team on March 19, 2012, by the GMHL. On September 15, 2012, it played its first game, in Thornhill, Ontario, against the Toronto Canada Moose, where it picked up its first victory 10–2. Andrew Magee scored the first goal in team history 4:09 into the first period. Caydon Edwards made 23 saves in the win. On September 18, it played its first home game, against the Moose, and won 9–7.

The team ceased operations after the 2016–17 season.

== Season-by-season standings ==
Season	GP	W	L	T	OTL	GF	GA	Pts	Regular season finish	Playoffs
2012–13	42	21	21	0	0	185	187	42	7th of 15, GMHL	Lost Div. Quarter-finals, 2–3 (Bucks)
2013–14	42	24	15	—	3	218	144	51	9th of 20, GMHL	Lost Div. Quarter-finals, 0–3 (Rattlers)
2014–15	42	34	6	—	2	262	119	70	2nd of 12, South Div. 4th of 22, GMHL	Won Div. Semi-finals, 3–0 (Predators); Won Conf. Semi-finals, 3–0 (Blue Ice Jets); Lost League Semi-finals, 0–4 (Huskies)
2015–16	42	33	7	0	2	253	94	68	2nd of 10, South Div. 7th of 30, GMHL	Won Div. Quarter-finals, 3–0 (Lakers); Lost Div. Semi-finals, 2–3 (Ravens)
2016–17	42	22	19	0	0	203	190	44	6th of 11, South Div. 12th of 21, GMHL	Lost Div. Quarter-finals, 0–3 (Kings)
