= Kingsville Kings =

- City: Kingsville, Ontario, Canada
- League: Greater Metro Junior A Hockey League
- Division: South
- Founded: 2015
- Operated: 2015–2021
- Folded: 2021
- Home arena: Kingsville Arena Complex
- Colours
- Owner(s): Global Hockey Management
- General manager: Andy Dowling(2017)
- Head coach: Doug Raymond(2017)
- Asst. coach: Mathias Gardiman(2018)
- Captain: C - Noah Shultz (2019-20) A - Zachary Dillen (2019-20) A - Dexter Gourlay (2019-20) A - Pavel Svoboda (2019-20)
- Website: KingsvilleKings.com

Championships
- Conference titles: 2015–16

The Kingsville Kings are a junior ice hockey team based in Kingsville, Ontario, Canada. They are members of the South Division of the Greater Metro Junior A Hockey League (GMHL). The Kings were founded in 2015 and joined the GMHL to compete in the 2015–16 season. The club plays their home games at Kingsville Arena Complex.

After ending of the 2020–21 season, they have been not listed as a league member for the 2021–22 season.

== History ==
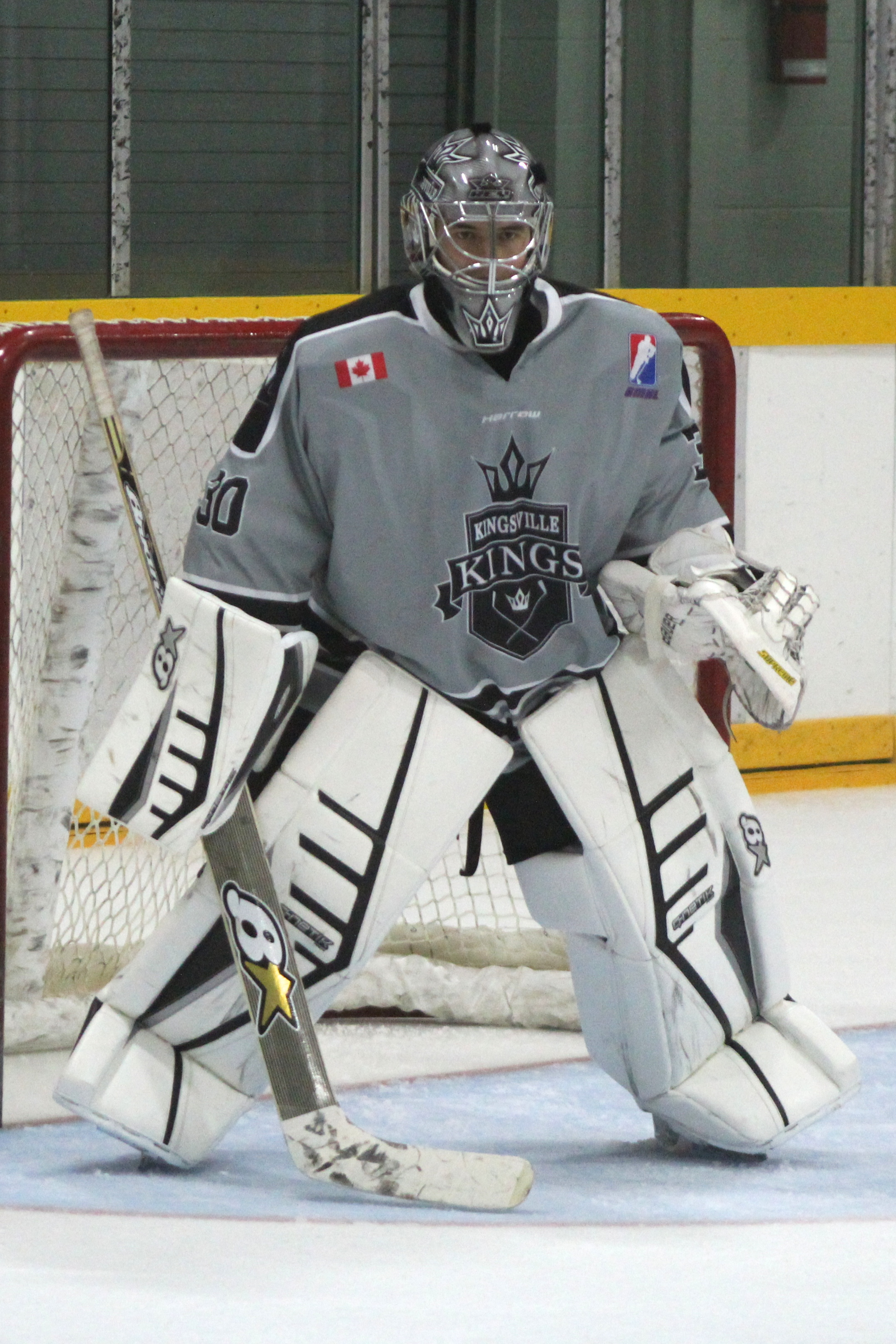
Kings' Jan Pechek in net in 2015.

The Kingsville Kings was announced to the public in summer 2015 with local Tom Schinkelshoek named the team president. The Kings started their first season with a lengthy undefeated streak. Their first game took place in Brantford, Ontario, on September 8, 2015, against the Brantford Steelfighters, winning 11–0. Jan Pechek and Léon Marty split the first win and shutout in team history, while Alexander Naskov scored the first goal in team history with 7:57 left in the first period. The Kings' first home game was on September 11 against the Toronto Blue Ice Jets, winning 4–3. Pechek picked up the team's first home victory in net with 27 saves. Kingsville's streak was snapped after 22 wins by the Komoka Dragons. The Kings finished first in the GMHL's South Division and second place overall with 39 wins, 2 losses, and a forfeit due to weather. Jan Pechek led the GMHL with wins (24) and saves percentage (0.951), while Wes Werner set a league record with a goals against average of 1.20. As a core, the Kings set a league record for lowest recorded goals allowed with 71.

The Kings gained international attention due to a video recorded during a road game against the London Lakers on November 20, 2015. A brawl broke out when a London player struck Kingsville's goalie Jan Pechek. During the fight, a linesman struck a London player and then was attacked by a member of the London Lakers' bench staff.

The Kings finished their inaugural season with the South Division's regular season and playoff championships, but eventually lost the GMHL Russell Cup final in seven games to the Tottenham Steam.

== Season-by-season results ==
Season	GP	W	L	T	OTL	GF	GA	PTS	Finish	Playoffs
2015–16	42	39	3	0	0	314	71	78	1st of 10, South Div. 2nd of 30, GMHL	Won Div. Quarter-finals, 3–0 (Renegades); Won Div. Semi-finals, 3–0 (Whalers); Won Div. Finals, 4–0 (Ravens); 1st in Round Robin (3–0–1); Lost Russell Cup Final Game, 4–3 (Steam)
2016–17	42	29	8	—	5	239	148	63	3rd of 11, South Div. 5th of 21, GMHL	Won Div. Quarter-finals, 3–0 (Attack); Lost Div. Semi-finals, 0–3 (Ravens)
2017–18	42	33	9	—	0	290	138	66	2nd of 12, South Div. 2nd of 21, GMHL	Won Div. Quarter-finals, 2–0 (Stars); Lost Div. Semi-finals, 0–3 (Whalers)
2018–19	42	25	16	—	1	246	164	51	4th of 12, South Div. 7th of 22, GMHL	Won Div. Quarter-finals, 2–0 (Nationals); Lost Div. Semi-finals, 1–3 (Hurricanes)
2019–20	42	28	11	—	3	207	165	59	4th of 10, South Div. 7th of 23, GMHL	Won Div. Quarter-finals, 2–1 (Stars); Lost Div. Semi-finals, 0–3 (Ravens)

== League awards ==
- 2015–16 Top Forward - Ludwig Niederbach
- 2015–16 Top Goaltender - Jan Pechek
- 2016–17 Top Defensive Forward - Blake Naida
- 2018–19 Top Defensive Forward - Zachary Dillen

== Championships ==
- 2015–16 GMHL South Division regular season champions
- 2016 GMHL South Division playoff champions
- 2016 GMHL playoff finalists
