= New Tecumseth Civics =

- City: Alliston, Ontario, Canada
- League: Greater Metro Junior A Hockey League
- Founded: 2013; 13 years ago
- Folded: 2022; 4 years ago
- Home arena: New Tecumseth Recreation Complex
- Colours: Red and white
- Owner(s): Nikita Vasiliev
- General manager: Jordan Richardson
- Head coach: Joseph Cathcart

Franchise history
- 2013–2016: Alliston Coyotes
- 2016–2022: New Tecumseth Civics

The New Tecumseth Civics were a Canadian Junior ice hockey team based in Alliston, Ontario. They played in the Greater Metro Junior A Hockey League (GMHL).

== History ==
The Alliston Coyotes joined the GMHL in spring 2013. The Coyotes played their first game, at home, on September 12, 2013. Hosting the Toronto Attack, the Coyotes lost 4-2. The first goal in team history was scored by Gordy Bonnel 18 seconds into the second period of play. Bruno Novotny played the first game in net, making 44 saves in the effort. On September 19, 2013, the Coyotes would pick up their first franchise win in an 8-1 victory over the Knights of Meaford. Filip Sedivy would pick up the eventual game-winning goal at 5:40 of the first period. In goal, Nicolas Lachance made 29 saves for the victory.

Jim Aldred coached the Coyotes during the 2014–15 GMHL season, leading them to a seventh place in the South Division with 20 wins in 42 games, and 40 points. He returned for the 2015–16 GMHL season, he developed a fast-skating, and puck-possession team, using systems-oriented coaching. Alliston led the Central Division with 28 wins in 31 games by January, with Aldred and two of his players named to Team World in the league's all-star game. Alliston finished the season second place in the Central Division with 36 wins in 42 games, having led the division for most of the season until surpassed by the Tottenham Steam.

In April 2016, Alliston Coyotes have been re-branded the New Tecumseth Civics after Ryan Wood, who had won two Russell Cup Champions in the previous three years, was brought in to manage the franchise.

== Season-by-season standings ==
Season	GP	W	L	T	OTL	GF	GA	Pts	Regular season finish	Playoffs
Alliston Coyotes
2013–14	42	30	10	—	2	239	158	62	7th GMHL	Won Div. Quarter-finals, 3–1 (Americans); Lost Division Semi-finals, 0–3 (Bulls)
2014–15	42	20	22	—	0	211	213	40	4th South-Central Div. 7th GMHL	Won 2nd Rd. Elimination Game, 11–3 (Americans); Lost Division Semi-finals, 2–3 (Steam)
2015–16	42	36	5	0	1	328	110	73	2nd Central Div. 4th GMHL	Won Div. Quarter-finals, 3–0 (Bravehearts); Won Div. Semi-finals, 3–1 (Riverkings); Lost Div. Finals, 0–4 (Steam)
New Tecumseth Civics
2016–17	42	37	5	0	0	252	101	74	1st of 10, North Div. 2nd of 21, GMHL	Won Div. Quarter-finals, 3–0 (Knights); Won Div. Semi-finals, 3–1 (Titans); Lost Div. Finals, 3–4 (Islanders)
2017–18	42	23	18	0	1	199	165	47	6th of 9, North Div. 11th of 21, GMHL	Lost Div. Quarter-finals, 0–2 (Pirates)
2018–19	42	24	15	0	3	192	173	51	4th of 10, North Div. 8th of 22, GMHL	Won Div. Quarter-finals, 2–1 (Spartans); Lost Div. Semi-finals, 0–3 (Pirates)
2019–20	42	25	15	0	2	224	160	52	5th of 10, North Div. 9th of 23, GMHL	Lost Div. Quarter-finals, 0–2 (Rattlers)
2020–21	Season lost to COVID-19 pandemic									
2021–22	38	10	26	0	2	110	167	22	8th of 10, North Div. 16th of 19, GMHL	Won 8th Pl Elimination game 6-4 (Shield); Lost Div. Quarter-finals, 0–2 (Titans)
2022–23	civics did not participate this season									
