= NFP Athletic Centre =

Ice hockey arena in Toronto, Ontario, Canada

- Location in Toronto Location in Ontario Location in Canada
- Former names: Beatrice Ice Gardens (1996–2007); Canlan Ice Sports – York (2007–2026)
- Address: 989 Murray Ross Pkwy, North York, Ontario
- Location: Toronto, Ontario
- Coordinates: 43°46′28″N 79°30′49″W
- Owner: Canlan Sports
- Capacity: 1,200
- Public transit: Pioneer Village station

Construction
- Opened: 1996

Tenants
- York Lions (OUA) 1996–present Toronto Attack (GMHL) (2012–2017); Toronto Predators (GMHL) (2017–2021); Toronto Six (PHF) 2020–2023

The NFP Athletic Centre – a Canlan Sports Community is an ice hockey arena in Toronto, Ontario, Canada, and is operated by Canlan Ice Sports Corporation. It is the main ice rink at York University's Keele Campus, as the home of the York Lions men's and women's varsity hockey teams. It was also the home of the Toronto Six of the Premier Hockey Federation. The facility opened in 1996 as the Beatrice Ice Gardens and has one Olympic-sized and five NHL-sized ice rinks. The seating capacity for the largest rink is 1,200. The arena has also been used for National Hockey League training camps.

The current complex replaced the York University Ice Palace, built in 1968. The building lacked seating for spectators and has since been converted into the Sherman Health Science Research Centre. The arena was purchased by Canlan Ice Sports in August 2007. On 1 October 2020, the Toronto Six announced they had an agreement in place to play their inaugural season in the Premier Hockey Federation, known at the time as the National Women's Hockey League, at the facility, as well as having locker rooms built out specifically for the team.

On February 4, 2026, NFP & Canlan Sports entered a branding agreement that included renaming the facility the NFP Athletic Centre – a Canlan Sports Community.
