= St. George Ravens =

- City: St. George, Ontario, Canada
- League: Greater Metro Junior A Hockey League
- Founded: 2013
- Home arena: Gaukel Memorial Community Centre
- Colours: Blue, light blue, and white
- Owner: Russ Lockwood
- General manager: Wade Clubb
- Head coach: Matt Overeem

Franchise history
- 2013–2016: Halton Ravens
- 2016–present: St. George Ravens

The St. George Ravens are a Canadian junior "A" ice hockey team based in Brant, Ontario. They play in the Greater Metro Junior A Hockey League (GMHL).

== History ==
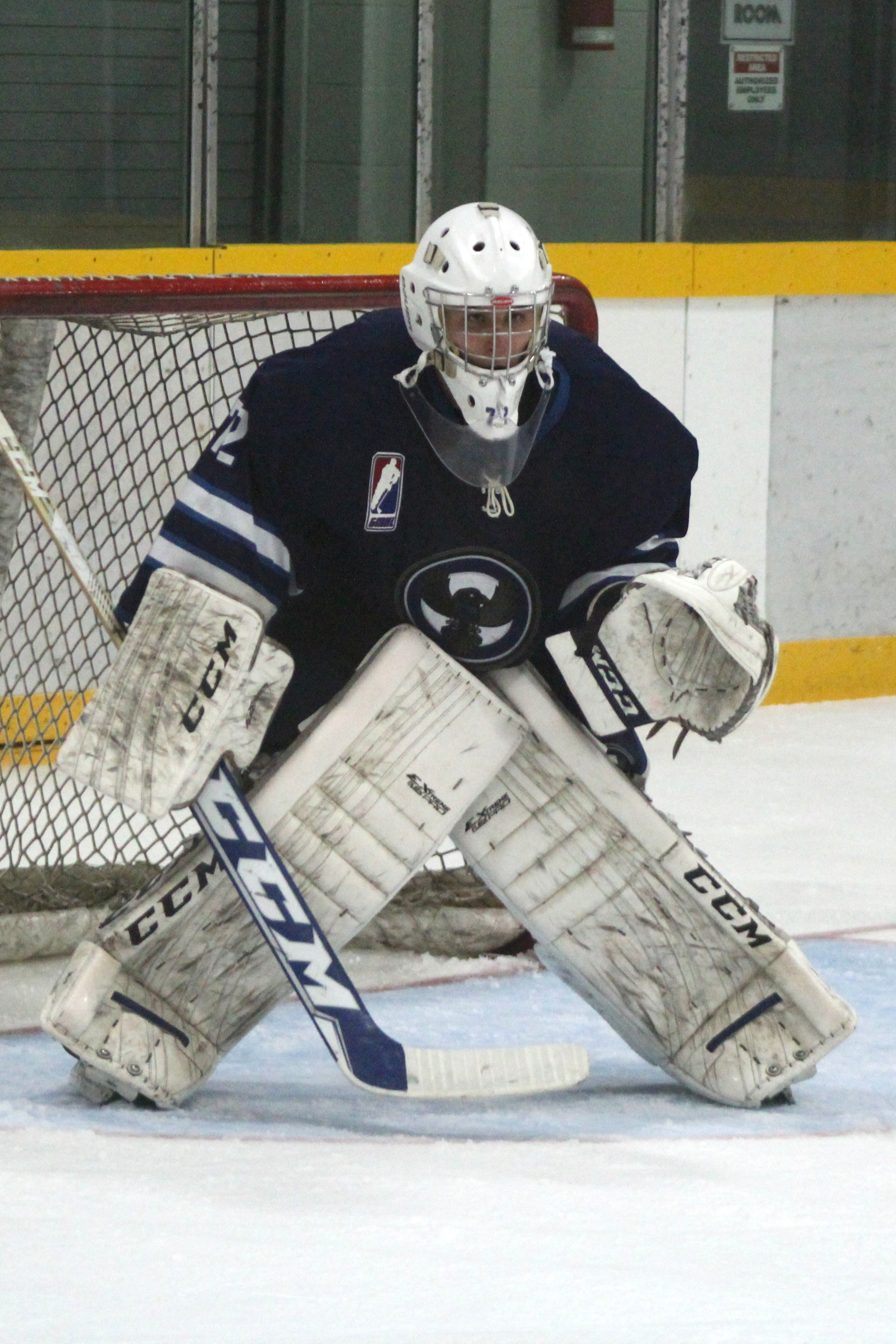
Ravens goalie during 2015–16 season

Originally announced as the Cyclones, the Halton Ravens joined the GMHL in spring 2013, based in Burlington, Ontario. On September 5, 2013, the Ravens played their first game in team history, at home, against the defending league champion Bradford Rattlers which the Ravens lost 6–1. Brett Lee scored the first goal in franchise history at 6:47 of the second period. On September 15, 2013, the Ravens won their first game, at home, versus the Powassan Eagles. The final score was 7–4, with Adam Ostermeier scoring the game winner halfway through the third. Mike Calouri made 29 saves for the win. In 2016–17, the Ravens moved from playing in Burlington to Brant, Ontario, and became the St. George Ravens. The Ravens had a 33–7–0–2 regular season record coming and made the division finals.

== Season-by-season standings ==
Season	GP	W	L	T	OTL	GF	GA	Pts	Regular season finish	Playoffs
Halton Ravens
2013–14	42	20	21	—	1	178	176	41	12th of 20, GMHL	Lost div. quarterfinals, 0–3 (Blue Ice Jets)
2014–15	42	29	12	—	1	275	174	59	2nd of 12, South Div. 8th of 22, GMHL	Won div. semifinals, 3–1 (Whalers); Won div. finals, 3–2 (Steam); Lost League semifinals, 3–4 (Titans)
2015–16	42	29	11	0	2	218	152	60	3rd of 10, South Div. 10th of 30, GMHL	Won div. quarterfinals, 3–0 (Predators); Won div. semifinals, 3–2 (Attack); Lost div. finals, 0–4 (Kings)
St. George Ravens
2016–17	42	33	7	0	2	287	122	68	2nd of 11, South Div. 4th of 21, GMHL	Won div. quarterfinals, 3–0 (Predators); Won div. semifinals, 3–0 (Kings); Lost div. finals, 0–4 (Whalers)
2017–18	42	38	3	0	1	404	136	77	1st of 12, South Div. 1st of 21, GMHL	Won div. quarterfinals, 2–0 (Predators); Won div. semifinals, 3–0 (Bulls); Won div. finals, 4–2 (Whalers); Lost Russell Cup Championships, 2–4 (Spartans)
2018–19	42	39	3	0	0	324	116	78	1st of 12, South Div. 1st of 22, GMHL	Won div. quarterfinals, 2–0 (Steam); Won div. semifinals, 3–1 (Whalers); Won div. finals, 2–0 (Hurricanes) (Note: Tillsonburg forfeited the final two games after they lost five players to food poisoning.); Lost Russell Cup Championships, 0–4 (Pirates)
2019–20	42	34	8	0	0	305	142	68	1st of 10, South Div. 1st of 23, GMHL	Won div. quarterfinals, 2–0 (Predators); Won div. semifinals, 3–0 (Kings); Led div. finals, 2–1 (Whalers); Postseason cancelled
2020–21	Season lost due to COVID-19 pandemic									
2021–22	38	24	13	0	1	212	138	49	4th of 9, South Div. 7th of 19, GMHL	Won div. quarterfinals, 2–0 (Stars); Lost div. semifinals, 2-3 (Roadrunners)
2022–23	42	20	21	0	1	145	214	41	5th of 9, South Div. 9th of 16, GMHL	Lost div. quarterfinals, 1-2 (Predators)
2023–24	42	20	20	0	2	137	144	42	4th of 8, South Div. 9th of 15, GMHL	Won div. quarterfinals, 2-1 (Railers); Lost div. semifinals, 0-3 (Renegades)
2024–25	42	20	18	0	4	165	178	44	3rd of 9, South Div. 8th of 15, GMHL	Won div. quarterfinals, 2-0 (Predators); Lost div. semifinals, 0-3 (Renegades)
2025–26	42	19	22	0	1	145	172	39	5th of 8, South Div. 10th of 14, GMHL	Won div. quarterfinals, 2-1 (Renegades); Lost div. semifinals, 0-3 (Stars)
