= Almaguin Spartans =

Canadian junior ice hockey team

- City: Sundridge, Ontario, Canada
- League: Greater Metro Junior A Hockey League
- Founded: 2011
- Home arena: Sundridge Strong Joly (SSJ) Arena
- Colours: Green, black, and white
- General manager: David Forde
- Head coach: Myles Pepin

Franchise history
- 2011–2014: Mattawa Voyageurs
- 2014–2024: Almaguin Spartans

The Almaguin Spartans were a Canadian junior ice hockey team based in South River, Ontario. They play in the Greater Metro Junior A Hockey League (GMHL). They were originally the Mattawa Voyageurs of Mattawa, Ontario.

== History ==
The Voyageurs were announced as a team in spring 2011. On September 16, 2011, the team played its first game, at home, against the Bobcaygeon Bucks. The Voyageurs lost the game in a shootout 5–4. On September 18, at home again, the Voyageurs picked up their first win, 5–4 in overtime over the Algoma Avalanche.

In July 2014, the team was approved for relocation to South River, Ontario, where they became the Almaguin Spartans.

In March 2015, Myles Pepin was promoted from assistant coach and was named the team's new head coach.

During the 2018 playoffs, the Spartans swept their first three playoff series with nine straight wins before losing two games to the St. George Ravens in the final series. The Spartans then claimed their first Russell Cup championship over the Ravens in six games.

For the 2019–20 season, Andre Laperriere was named the head coach when Pepin stepped aside for an advisory role to spend more time with family.

After eight games of the 2024-25 season the Spartans announced that they were ceasing operations.

== Season-by-season records ==
Season	GP	W	L	T	OTL	GF	GA	Pts	Regular season finish	Playoffs
Mattawa Voyageurs
2011–12	42	19	21	—	2	170	206	40	9th GMHL	Lost Bye Round
2012–13	42	10	30	1	1	169	289	22	14th GMHL	Lost Division Quarter-finals
2013–14	42	16	24	—	2	185	279	34	14th GMHL	Lost Division Quarter-finals
Almaguin Spartans
2014–15	42	16	24	—	2	196	211	26	4th North Div. 13th GMHL	Lost Elimination Qualifier
2015–16	42	34	7	0	1	267	107	69	3rd North Div. 5th GMHL	Lost Championship play-in game
2016–17	42	23	15	0	3	164	154	49	6th of 10, North Div. 11th of 21, GMHL	Lost Division Quarter-finals
2017–18	42	31	11	0	0	217	145	62	1st of 9, North Div. 4th of 21, GMHL	Russell Cup Champions
2018–19	42	21	19	0	2	183	187	44	5th of 10, North Div. 10th of 22, GMHL	Lost Division Quarter-finals
2019–20	42	18	21	0	3	191	218	39	7th of 10, North Div. 16th of 23, GMHL	Lost Division Semi-finals
2020–21	Season Lost to COVID 19 pandemic									
2021–22	38	7	28	0	3	94	177	17	10th of 10, North Div. 18th of 19, GMHL	Lost Play in Rd 0-1 (South Muskoka Shield)
2022–23	Spartans did not compete this season									
2023–24	42	11	29	0	2	130	236	24	6th of 7, North Div. 13th of 15, GMHL	Lost Play in Game 4-5 (Le Becard de Senneterre)
2024–25	Spartans folded start of season									

=== Playoffs ===
- 2012

Orangeville Americans defeated Mattawa Voyageurs 2-games-to-none in bye round

- 2013

Temiscaming Titans defeated Mattawa Voyageurs 3-games-to-none in division quarter-finals

- 2014

South Muskoka Shield defeated Mattawa Voyageurs 3-games-to-none in division quarter-finals

- 2015

Sturgeon Falls Lumberjacks defeated Almaguin Spartans 5–4 (OT) in the North Division Elimination Qualifier Game

- 2016

Almaguin Spartans defeated Bracebridge Blues 3-games-to-1 in division quarter-finals
Almaguin Spartans defeated Temiscaming Titans 3-games-to-1 in division semi-finals
Almaguin Spartans defeated South Muskoka Shield 4-games-to-2 in division finals
Almaguin Spartans 1–3 in Russell Cup Round Robin (Lost 1–4 vs. Steam, Lost 1–5 vs. Kings, Lost 1–7 vs. Kings, Won 4–3 vs. Steam)
Tottenham Steam defeated Almaguin Spartans 7–2 in the Russell Cup Championship play-in game.

- 2017

South Muskoka Shield defeated Almaguin Spartans 3-games-to-2 in division quarter-finals

- 2018

Almaguin Spartans defeated South Muskoka Shield 2-games-to-none in division quarter-finals
Almaguin Spartans defeated Temiscaming Titans 3-games-to-none in division semi-finals
Almaguin Spartans defeated Bradford Rattlers 4-games-to-none in division finals
Almaguin Spartans defeated St. George Ravens 4-games-to-2 in Russell Cup finals

- 2019

New Tecumseth Civics defeated Almaguin Spartans 2-games-to-1 in division quarter-finals

- 2020

Almaguin Spartans defeated Ville-Marie Pirates 2-games-to-1 in division quarter-finals
Temiscaming Titans defeated Almaguin Spartans 3-games-to-none in division semi-finals
