= North York Renegades =

- City: Toronto, Ontario, Canada
- League: Greater Metro Junior A Hockey League
- Founded: 2014; 12 years ago
- Operated: 2014–present
- Home arena: Canlan Ice Sports – York
- Colours
- Owner: Isac Karlsson
- Head coach: Darryl Lloyd (2018–19)
- Website: Renegadeshockeyclub.ca

The North York Renegades are a junior ice hockey team based in Toronto, Ontario, Canada. They are members of the South Division of the Greater Metro Junior A Hockey League (GMHL). The Renegades were founded in 2014 and joined the GMHL to compete in the 2014–15 season. The club plays their home games at Canlan Ice Sports – York.

== History ==
In June 2014, it was announced that the Renegades had been granted a franchise in the Greater Metro Junior A Hockey League (GMHL) for the 2014–15 season. The club was created by Allan Donnan and owned by TPA Sports and to play their home games out of York University's Canlan Ice Sports – York. The Renegades finished their debut regular season in last place overall and sixth in the South Division of the South Conference. All clubs advanced to the 2014–15 Russell Cup playoffs with the Renegades being drawn against the Cambridge Bears in Round One of the sudden death Elimination Qualifiers. The Renegades were defeated 2–3, ending their playoff run.

After the end of their first season, the team was sold by TPA Sports to Joey Gagne of Abrams Towing. In August 2015, it was announced that the Renegades had hired Ryan Ramsay has the new head coach, replacing Brad Davenport. Prior to the start of the 2015–16 season the GMHL realigned the teams into three divisions, North, Central and South, and dropped the two conferences for the season. The Renegades were placed into the eleven team South Division.

== Season-by-season results ==
Season	GP	W	L	T	OTL	GF	GA	PTS	Finish	Playoffs
2014–15	42	6	31	—	5	136	289	17	6th GMHL-South	Lost Rd. 1 Qualifier Game, 2–3 (Cambridge Bears)
2015–16	42	7	31	0	4	118	242	18	9th of 10, South Div. 27th of 30, GMHL	Won Rd. 1 Qualifier Game, 1–0 (Vikings); Won Rd. 2 Qualifier Game, 5–1 (Blue Ice Jets); Lost Div. Quarter-finals, 0–3 (Kings)
2016–17	42	29	10	0	3	197	133	61	4th of 11, South Div. 6th of 21, GMHL	Won Div. Quarter-finals, 3–0 (Lakers); Lost Div. Semi-finals, 0–3 (Whalers)
2017–18	42	29	9	0	4	218	134	62	4th of 12, South Div. 6th of 21, GMHL	Lost Div. Quarter-finals, 1–2 (Bulls)
2018–19	42	20	19	0	3	200	194	43	7th of 12, South Div. 12th of 22, GMHL	Lost Div. Quarter-finals, 1–2 (Hurricanes)
2019–20	42	29	11	0	2	222	124	60	3rd of 10, South Div. 5th of 23, GMHL	Won Div. Quarter-finals, 2–0 (Lakers); Lost Div. Semi-finals, 0–3 (Whalers)
2020–21	Season lost due to COVID-19 pandemic									
2021–22	38	31	7	0	0	244	130	62	2nd of 9, South Div. 4th of 19, GMHL	Won Div. Quarter-finals, 2–0 (Flyers); Won Div. Semi-finals, 3-1 (Predators); Lost Div. Finals, 3-4 (Roadrunners)
2022–23	42	36	6	0	0	281	107	72	1st of 9, South Div. 2nd of 16, GMHL	Won Div. Quarter-finals, 2–0 (Flyers); Won Div. Semi-finals, 3-0 (Predators); Won Div. Final, 4-0 (Bulls); South Division rep to Russell Cup finals (see below)
2023–24	42	35	5	0	2	267	118	72	1st of 7, South Div. 2nd of 15, GMHL	Won Div. Quarter-finals, 2–0 (Flyers); Won Div. Semi-finals, 3-0 (Ravens); Lost Div. Finals, 1-4 (Bulls)
2024–25	43	29	13	0	1	183	129	59	2nd of 9, South Div. 4th of 15, GMHL	Won Div. Quarter-finals, 2–0 (Roadrunners); Won Div. Semi-finals, 3-0 (Ravens); Won Div. Finals, 4-0 (Railers); Lost League Finals 1-4 (Rattlers)
2025–26	43	21	20	0	1	148	182	43	4th of 8, South Div. 8th of 14, GMHL	Lost Div. Quarter-finals, 1-2 (Ravens)

== Russell Cup Finals ==
National Championships (GMHL North and South and Western)

Year	Preliminary Round	Record	Standing	Bronze Medal Game	Gold Medal Game
2023	L, (Bradford Rattlers) 4-7; W,(High Prairie Red Wings) 6-3; L, (Temiscaming Titans) 0-4	1-2-0	3rd of 4	not competed	did not qualify

== Head coaches ==
- Brad Davenport, 2014–15
- Ryan Ramsay, 2015–2018
- Darryl Lloyd, 2018–present
