= Orangeville Ice Crushers =

Orangeville Blitz
- City: Orangeville, Ontario, Canada
- League: Greater Metro Junior A Hockey League
- Division: South
- Founded: 2026; 0 years ago
- Home arena: Alder Street Recreation Facility
- Colours: Blue, orange, and white
- Owner: RCR Entertainment
- General manager: CJ Schneider (suspended); Jeff Oliver(2016–17)
- Head coach: CJ Schneider (suspended); Jeff Oliver(2016–17)
- Media: Orangeville Banner

Franchise history
- 2011–2015: Orangeville Americans
- 2015–2017: Orangeville Ice Crushers
- 2026–next: Orangeville Blitz

The Orangeville Ice Crushers were a junior ice hockey team based in Orangeville, Ontario, Canada. They played in the Greater Metro Junior A Hockey League (GMHL).

Orangeville Americans logo used from 2011 to 2015.

== History ==
The Orangeville Americans were announced in the spring of 2011 with the roster to be composed of only American players.

On September 12, 2011, the Americans played their first game at home against the Bradford Rattlers. The Rattlers won the game 5–2. During this game, the first Americans' goal was scored by 16-year-old Dominic Poya from Chicago. On September 19, the Americans won their first game 7–2 at home against the Shelburne Red Wings.

On January 1, 2015, the club announced that RCR Entertainment had become the new team owners. The new ownership then renamed the team to the Orangeville Ice Crushers.

On November 15, 2016, three of the team's owners were arrested for growing and distributing marijuana including the head coach CJ Schneider. The GMHL immediately suspended those involved and named Ice Crushers shareholder Jeff Oliver as general manager and head coach.

In January 2017, the Ice Crushers website was deactivated. The Ice Crushers last played a game on January 11, losing to the Parry Sound Islanders 12–0. The team then forfeited a home game on January 18 and an away game on January 19 against the New Tecumseth Civics. The Civics reported on their social media pages that the game had been cancelled due to the Ice Crushers shutting down for the remainder of the season. The team was 7–26–0–0 before the forfeited games.

The team did not return the following season.

== Season-by-season standings ==
Season	GP	W	L	T	OTL	GF	GA	Pts	Regular season finish	Playoffs
Orangeville Americans
2011–12	42	19	18	—	5	172	174	43	8th GMHL	Lost quarter-final
2012–13	42	16	21	3	2	150	171	37	9th GMHL	Lost division final
2013–14	42	25	15	—	2	239	201	52	8th GMHL	Lost Division Quarter-final
2014–15	42	9	30	—	3	136	245	21	5th of 6, South-Central Div. 18th of 22, GMHL	Lost Round 2 elimination qualifiers
Orangeville Ice Crushers
2015–16	42	16	24	0	2	194	217	34	8th of 10, Central Div. 23rd of 29, GMHL	Lost 8th place playoff qualifier
2016–17	33	7	26	0	0	108	210	14	Suspended operations midseason	
Orangeville Blitz

=== Playoffs ===
- 2012 Lost quarter-final

Orangeville Americans defeated Mattawa Voyageurs 2-games-to-none
Temiscaming Titans defeated Orangeville Americans 3-games-to-none

- 2013 Lost division final

Orangeville Americans defeated Shelburne Red Wings 3-games-to-2
Orangeville Americans defeated Bradford Bulls 3-games-to-1
Bradford Rattlers defeated Orangeville Americans 4-games-to-none

- 2014 Lost division quarter-final

Alliston Coyotes defeated Orangeville Americans 3-games-to-1

- 2015 Lost South Conference Elimination Round 2

Orangeville Americans defeated Bradford Bulls 6–5(game)
Alliston Coyotes defeated Orangeville Americans 11–3 (game)

- 2016 Lost Central Division 8th place qualifier

Colborne Chiefs defeated Orangeville Ice Crushers 5–3 (game)
