= Muskoka Bears (PJHL) =

- City: Bracebridge, Ontario, Canada
- League: Provincial Junior Hockey League
- Division: Carruthers
- Founded: 2024
- Home arena: Muskoka Lumber Community Centre
- Colours: Red and White
- Owner: not-for-profit
- General manager: Joe Rockbrune

The Muskoka Bears are a Canadian Junior ice hockey team based in Bracebridge, Ontario, Canada. They play in the Provincial Junior Hockey League (PJHL).

== History ==
There have been Multiple junior hockey teams in Bracebridge. The last time Bracebridge had a junior C team was the Bracebridge Bears 1974-78. In between the Jr C affiliations Bracebridge had junior teams involved with the independent Greater Metro Junior A Hockey League and the Canadian International Hockey League.The Phantoms were announced on April 14, 2012, by the GMHL. In 2014, after a rough season and some ownership woes, the team was supposed to move out of the GMHL and into the rival Canadian International Hockey League. The GMHL ownership stepped in and stopped the move. In April 2014, the ownership of the team was changed by the league and the team became the Bracebridge Blues. After playing five games and forfeiting the sixth game of the 2016–17 season, the Blues were removed from the GMHL schedule.

The Provincial Junior Hockey League announced the Muskoka Bears as an expansion team starting in the 2024 season. The team was placed in the North Conference in the Carruthers Division.

== Season-by-season standings ==
	Muskoka Bears									
Season	GP	W	L	OTL	SOL	GF	GA	P	Results	Playoffs
2024–25	42	6	34	1	1	72	243	14	8 of 8 Carruthers; 16 of 16 Nor Conf; 60 of 63 PJHL	Lost Div Quarters Alliston 0-4
2025–26	42	13	26	3	0	118	181	29	6 of 8 Carruthers; 10 of 15 Nor Conf; 48 of 61 PJHL	Lost Div Quarters Orillia 0-4
