= Bradford Rattlers =

- City: Bradford West Gwillimbury, Ontario, Canada
- League: Greater Metro Junior A Hockey League
- Founded: 1971
- Home arena: BWG Leisure Centre
- Colours: Green, black, yellow, and white
- General manager: Sean Werth (2015–present)
- Head coach: Dave Mooney

Franchise history
- 1971–1975: Bradford Vasey Juniors
- 1975–1988: Bradford Blues
- 1988–2006: Bradford Bulls
- 2006–present: Bradford Rattlers

The Bradford Rattlers are a Canadian junior ice hockey team based out of Bradford West Gwillimbury, Ontario, and members of the Greater Metro Junior A Hockey League. The Rattlers, then known as the Bradford Bulls, were bought out towards the end of the 2005–06 season by a local group of investors for the purpose of moving the team up to Junior "A" from the Georgian Mid-Ontario Junior C Hockey League.

== History ==
The Bradford Vasey Juniors were founded in 1971 as they joined the South-Central Junior "D" Hockey League. The league soon became the Central Junior "C", then the Mid-Ontario Junior "C", and finally after merging with the Georgian Junior "C" league became the Georgian Mid-Ontario Junior "C" Hockey League. Their team's first championship was the Junior "D" OHA Cup in 1973. They won the All-Ontario Junior "D" title by defeating the Mitchell Hawks 4-games-to-1. That summer, the SCJDHL was promoted to Junior "C" for the 1974–75 season, and changed their name to the Bradford Blues for the 1975–76 season. In 1980, Bradford won their league and went all the way to the Clarence Schmalz Cup All-Ontario Final. In the end, they lost out to the Leamington Flyers 4-games-straight. In 1986, they made it all the way back to the All-Ontario final only to lose to the Norwich Merchants 4-games-to-3. The team changed its name to Bradford Bulls for the 1988–89 season, in which they immediately struck gold; they won their league and then followed it up with a 4-games-to-2 series victory to defeat the Hanover Barons to win their only ever Clarence Schmalz Cup. The Bulls won the league again in 1998, but did not reach the All-Ontario Final. The Most valuable Player of the playoffs was Noah Bell, who was drafted into the Ontario Hockey League a year later by the Sudbury Wolves.

Bulls' Logo

The Bradford Bulls were bought out towards the end of the 2005–06 season by a local party who owned an independent Junior "A" travelling team known as the Toronto Rattlers, though technically a Toronto-area franchise. The Rattlers toured the United States playing games in junior hockey tournaments and against college teams from 2004 until 2006. A number of alumni received US college offers and Russian-based player Kirill Tulupov, who made his presence known in North America by touring with the Toronto Rattlers, was taken by the New Jersey Devils in the third round of the 2006 NHL entry draft. The new ownership group believed that combining the operations and management of the thirty-five-year-old Branford franchise with the experience of the Toronto Rattlers would earn the Bradford franchise a move up to the Ontario Provincial Junior A Hockey League, but when the Ontario Hockey Association (OHA) turned down the request the team walked away from the OHA's version of Junior "A". The Bradford franchise adopted the nickname of the now disbanded travelling team, and the Bradford Rattlers became a member of the Greater Metro Junior A Hockey League (GMHL).

=== 2006–07 ===
The Bradford Rattlers first game in the GMHL was against the South Muskoka Shield on September 15, 2006, in Gravenhurst, Ontario. The Rattlers dismantled the Shield, winning by a score of 10–1. Andreas Goetz picked up the team's first Junior "A" victory in net. Their first home game was on September 17, 2006, against the Toronto Canada Moose, a 5–3 win.

On September 24, 2006, the Bradford Rattlers became the last undefeated team of the GMHL's inaugural season, moving to 5–0–0–0, defeating the (until then undefeated) Richmond Hill Rams by a score of 3–1. The winning streak lasted until October 15, 2006, 10–0–0–0, as the Rattlers picked up an overtime loss to the King Wild, but still had yet to lose a game in regulation. On January 21, 2007, the Rattlers had compiled a 27–0–0–4 record before playing the Deseronto Thunder. The Thunder were leading 5–2 but Bradford came only to lose for the first time in regulation by a score of 6–5.

The Rattlers finished the season in first place, earning a bye into the league semifinals. Their semifinals opponent was the Deseronto Thunder. The Thunder won the first two games of the series. The Rattlers pulled themselves together and won the next four games straight to play in the league finals. The finals were against the league's second seeded King Wild. The Rattlers started with a 2–1 victory but the Wild won the second game 6–3 to even the series. The Rattlers came back and won the next game 5–0 while the fourth and fifth games went to overtime with Bradford winning 2–1 and 4–3, respectively. The Bradford Rattlers won the first ever Bob Russell Cup as GMHL Champions.

The Rattlers faced the WHA Junior West Hockey League's New Westminster Whalers for the short-lived National Junior Hockey Alliance's "Alliance Cup," the only year in which this competition was contested. The Rattlers swept the series 3-games-to-none.

=== 2007–08 ===
On December 30, 2007, the Rattlers hosted the Moscow Selects All-star team in an exhibition game. The Selects won the game by a score of 8–4. This was the second game of seven that the Moscow team played against different GMHL clubs.

In 2007–08, the Rattlers challenged their 31-game record for regular season games without a regulation loss, but came up short with a still impressive 28-game streak with a 5–3 January 6 loss to the Deseronto Storm. The Rattlers did, however, set a new league record for regular season games without a regulation loss across multiple seasons with 38. This also marked the end of the longest winning streak in GMHL history of 27 straight wins.

The Rattlers began the 2008 playoffs against the Toronto Canada Moose, whom they swept. They then defeated the South Muskoka Shield 4-games-to-1. In the league semifinals, they swept the Elliot Lake Bobcats and in the league finals they swept the Innisfil Lakers to win their second straight Russell Cup.

=== 2008–09 ===
On January 5, 2009, the Rattlers played against Kazakhstan's Torpedo UST-Kamenogorsk Under-18 squad in Shelburne, Ontario. At one point leading 5–0, the Rattlers played a lot of their younger players in the second half of the game. The final score was 6–5 for Bradford.

The Rattlers finished the 2008–09 season with the second best record in the South Division and third best in the league. In the playoffs, the Rattlers first met the Toronto Canada Moose. After winning the first two games, the Moose came back and took game three and four of the best-of-five series to force a decisive game five. The Rattlers overcame the potential upset and won the series 3-games-to-2. In the division semifinals, the Rattlers drew the Deseronto Storm. The Rattlers took game one, but in game two and three the Storm took control. The Rattlers had to win game four to prolong the best-of-five series, and succeeded with a 5–1 victory. The next morning it was announced that the Deseronto Storm protested the result of game four due to a roster violation by Bradford. Upon review of the league, the result of game four was overturned and the Rattlers were disqualified from the remainder of the playoffs.

=== 2012–13 ===
The 2008 championship passed and in the four following years four different teams would claim the Russell Cup as GMHL. In those four years, the Rattlers failed to reach the finals in each of those years. The 2012–13 led to the Rattlers turning in the league's first undefeated season with a 42–0–0–0 record. There would be a black mark on this season though when the Rattlers competed in the league's showcase tournament in Bracebridge, Ontario, in late 2012. They turned in a less than stellar performance and were ejected from the tournament, along with longtime rival South Muskoka Shield, for a brawl and an off-ice altercation involving crowd members and ejected players that caused a police investigation. The Rattlers perfect season allowed them a date with the eighth seeded Lefroy Wave. Sweeping the Wave in three games extended the Rattlers winning streak to 45 games. They played the Bobcaygeon Bucks next, sweeping them in three games and extending their streak to 48 games. In the South Division final, the Rattlers faced the Orangeville Americans and swept them in four games. The series victory gave them a record of 52–0–0–0 so far that year. The perfect streak was snapped the very next game in the league final by the Temiscaming Titans 7–6 in overtime. Bradford would win games two and three to extend their record for streak of games without a regulation loss to 55 games before that streak was ended in regulation in game four by the Titans. The Rattlers would win games five and six and the series to claim their third Russell Cup.

== Season-by-season standings ==
Season	GP	W	L	T	OTL	GF	GA	Pts	Regular season finish	Playoffs
1971–72	30	16	12	2	—	168	144	34	4th SCJDHL	Lost semi-final
1972–73	29	20	4	5	—	175	99	47	2nd SCJDHL	Won League, won OHA Cup
1973–74	30	23	3	4	—	208	106	50	1st Central G1	Won League, lost CSC SF
1974–75	31	23	6	2	—	223	100	48	2nd Central G1	Won League, lost CSC QF
1975–76	32	17	10	5	—	159	132	39	4th Central G1	Lost final
1976–77	28	17	8	3	—	175	147	37	3rd Central G1	Lost final
1977–78	32	18	13	1	—	175	145	37	3rd MOJCHL	Lost final
1978–79	32	16	12	4	—	—	—	36	3rd MOJCHL	Lost final
1979–80	40	33	6	1	—	298	136	67	1st MOJCHL	Won League, lost CSC Final
1980–81	36	24	12	0	—	247	142	48	2nd MOJCHL	Won League, lost CSC QF
1981–82	40	34	5	1	—	328	154	69	2nd MOJCHL	Lost semi-final
1982–83	36	29	7	0	—	221	138	58	1st MOJCHL	Won League, lost CSC QF
1983–84	33	22	11	0	—	185	137	44	2nd MOJCHL	Lost quarter-final
1984–85	35	26	7	2	—	247	123	54	1st MOJCHL	Won League, lost CSC QF
1985–86	34	31	2	1	—	314	137	63	1st MOJCHL	Won League, lost CSC Final
1986–87	34	30	4	0	—	278	121	60	1st MOJCHL	Won League, lost CSC SF
1987–88	34	20	13	1	—	216	164	41	3rd MOJCHL	Lost final
1988–89	36	27	9	0	—	266	143	54	2nd MOJCHL	Won League, won CSC
1989–90	34	20	13	1	—	193	150	41	2nd MOJCHL	Lost final
1990–91	34	17	15	2	—	—	—	36	4th MOJCHL	Lost semi-final
1991–92	34	16	14	4	—	163	172	36	4th MOJCHL	Lost semi-final
1992–93	38	17	14	7	0	196	178	41	3rd MOJCHL	
1993–94	40	26	13	1	—	229	188	53	2nd MOJCHL	Lost final
1994–95	36	27	9	0	—	—	—	54	2nd GMOHL	
1995–96	44	26	17	1	—	220	159	53	3rd GMOHL	
1996–97	36	20	15	1	—	198	193	41	4th GMOHL	
1997–98	36	24	10	2	—	202	138	50	1st GMOHL	Won League
1998–99	36	21	14	1	—	188	170	43	4th GMOHL	
1999–00	36	21	13	2	—	178	174	44	3rd GMOHL	
2000–01	36	16	15	3	2	155	150	35	5th GMOHL	
2001–02	36	4	28	1	3	91	210	12	8th GMOHL	
2002–03	36	19	8	4	5	164	159	47	4th GMOHL	Lost quarter-final
2003–04	36	15	18	3	0	142	146	33	6th GMOHL	
2004–05	40	19	14	5	2	144	127	45	5th GMOHL	
2005–06	42	14	23	3	2	148	205	33	7th GMOHL	
2006–07	42	37	1	—	4	266	121	78	1st GMHL	Won League, won Alliance Cup
2007–08	42	37	4	—	1	314	110	75	1st GMHL	Won League
2008–09	43	34	6	—	3	284	132	71	3rd GMHL	Lost quarter-final
2009–10	42	34	6	—	2	273	150	70	3rd GMHL	Lost semi-final
2010–11	42	26	14	—	2	239	178	54	4th GMHL	Lost semi-final
2011–12	42	31	6	—	5	221	127	67	3rd GMHL	Lost semi-final
2012–13	42	42	0	0	0	301	95	84	1st GMHL	Won League
2013–14	42	30	8	—	4	230	116	64	6th GMHL	Lost final
2014–15	42	31	11	—	0	238	136	62	3rd South-Central Div. 7th GMHL	Lost Division Semi-finals
2015–16	42	29	11	0	2	219	145	60	3rd Central Div. 9th GMHL	Lost Division Quarter-finals
2016–17	42	28	14	0	0	254	185	56	4th of 10, North Div. 8th of 21, GMHL	Lost Division Quarter-finals
2017–18	42	31	11	0	0	222	124	56	2nd of 9, North Div. 5th of 21, GMHL	Lost Division Finals
2018–19	42	35	6	0	1	259	133	71	1st of 10, North Div. 2nd of 22, GMHL	Lost Division Finals
2019–20	42	27	13	0	2	230	148	56	4th of 10, North Div. 8th of 23, GMHL	Postseason cancelled
2020–21	season lost due to COVID-19 pandemic									
2021–22	38	31	5	0	2	230	190	93	2nd of 10, North Div. 3rd of 19, GMHL	Won Div. Quarterfinals, 2-0 (Lynx); Lost div. semi-finals, 2-3 (Bulls)
2022–23	42	38	2	0	2	270	97	78	1st of 9, North Div. 1st of 16, GMHL	Won Div. Semifinals, 3-0 (Titans); Won Div.Finals, 4-1 (Ville-Marie Pirates); North Division rep to Russell Cup finals (see below)
2023–24	42	38	3	0	1	294	101	77	1st of 7, North Div. 1st of 15, GMHL	Won Div. Semifinals, 3-0 (Titans); Div Finals, 4-0 (Lynx); Won League Finals, 4-1(Bulls); Russell Cup Champions
2024–25	42	37	3	0	2	269	128	76	1st of 6, North Div. 1st of 15, GMHL	Won Div. Semifinals, 3-0 (Knights); WonDiv Finals, 3-2 (River Dragons); Won League Finals, 4-1(Renegades); Russell Cup Champions
2025–26	42	33	9	0	0	255	112	66	2nd of 6, North Div. 3rd of 14, GMHL	Lost Div. Semifinals, 2-3 (Lynx)

(*) Standings incomplete.

== Russell Cup Finals ==
National Championships (GMHL North and South and Western)

Year	Preliminary Round	Record	Standing	Bronze Medal Game	Gold Medal Game
2023	W, (North York Renegades) 7-4; W, (Temiscaming Titans) 5-3; W, (High Prairie Red Wings) 11-2	3-0-0	1st of 4	not competed	Won (Temiscaming Titans) 7-0; National champions

=== Playoffs ===
- 2007 Won League, won Alliance Cup

Bradford Rattlers defeated Deseronto Thunder 4-games-to-2 in semi-finals
Bradford Rattlers defeated King Wild 4-games-to-1 in finals
Bradford Rattlers defeated New Westminster Whalers 3-games-to-none in Alliance Cup

- 2008 Won League

Bradford Rattlers defeated Toronto Canada Moose 4-games-to-none in bye round
Bradford Rattlers defeated South Muskoka Shield 4-games-to-1 in quarter-finals
Bradford Rattlers defeated Elliot Lake Bobcats 4-games-to-none in semi-finals
Bradford Rattlers defeated Innisfil Lakers 4-games-to-none in finals

- 2009 Lost Division Semi-finals

Bradford Rattlers defeated Toronto Canada Moose 3-games-to-2 in division quarter-finals
Deseronto Storm defeated Bradford Rattlers 3-games-to-1 in division semi-finals

- 2010 Lost semi-finals

Bradford Rattlers defeated Brock Bucks 3-games-to-none in quarter-finals
South Muskoka Shield defeated Bradford Rattlers 4-games-to-1 in semi-finals

- 2011 Lost semi-finals

Bradford Rattlers defeated Deseronto Storm 3-games-to-none in quarter-finals
South Muskoka Shield defeated Bradford Rattlers 4-games-to-3 in semi-finals

- 2012 Lost semi-finals

Bradford Rattlers defeated Lefroy Wave 3-games-to-2 in quarter-finals
Sturgeon Falls Lumberjacks defeated Bradford Rattlers 4-games-to-none in semi-finals

- 2013 Won League

Bradford Rattlers defeated Lefroy Wave 3-games-to-none in division quarter-finals
Bradford Rattlers defeated Bobcaygeon Bucks 3-games-to-none in division semi-finals
Bradford Rattlers defeated Orangeville Americans 4-games-to-none in division finals
Bradford Rattlers defeated Temiscaming Titans 4-games-to-2 in finals

- 2014 Lost finals

Bradford Rattlers defeated Toronto Attack 3-games-to-none in division quarter-finals
Bradford Rattlers defeated Toronto Blue Ice Jets 3-games-to-1 in division semi-finals
Bradford Rattlers defeated Seguin Huskies 4-games-to-none in crossover series
Bradford Bulls defeated Bradford Rattlers 4-games-to-1 in finals

- 2015 Lost Division Semi-finals

Toronto Blue Ice Jets defeated Bradford Rattlers 3-games-to-2 in division semi-finals

- 2016 Lost Division Quarter-finals

Knights of Meaford defeated Bradford Rattlers 3-games-to-1 in division quarter-finals

- 2017 Lost Division Quarter-finals

Temiscaming Titans defeated Bradford Rattlers 3-games-to-1 in division quarter-finals

- 2018 Lost Division Finals

Bradford Rattlers defeated West Nipissing Lynx 2-games-to-none in division quarter-finals
Bradford Rattlers defeated Ville-Marie Pirates 3-games-to-2 in division semi-finals
Almaguin Spartans defeated Bradford Rattlers 4-games-to-none in division finals

- 2019 Lost Division Finals

Bradford Rattlers defeated Knights of Meaford 2-games-to-none in division quarter-finals
Bradford Rattlers defeated West Nipissing Lynx 3-games-to-none in division semi-finals
Ville-Marie Pirates defeated Bradford Rattlers 4-games-to-2 in division finals

- 2020 Postseason cancelled prior to completion

Bradford Rattlers defeated New Tecumseth Civics 2-games-to-none in division quarter-finals
Bradford Rattlers defeated Bradford Bulls 3-games-to-2 in division semi-finals
Temiscaming Titans led Bradford Rattlers 3-games-to-1 in division finals before the postseason was cancelled due to COVID-19 pandemic

== Clarence Schmalz Cup appearances ==
1980: Leamington Flyers defeated Bradford Blues 4-games-to-none
1986: Norwich Merchants defeated Bradford Blues 4-games-to-3
1989: Bradford Bulls defeated Hanover Barons 4-games-to-2

== Organization staff history ==
Season	General manager	Head coach
2006–2008	Jenya Feldmen	
2008–2012	Johan Lundskog	
2012–2013	Johan Lundskog	John Duco
2013–2014	Johan Lundskog	Al Sims
2014–2015	Sylvain Cloutier	
2015–2017	Sean Werth	Matt Hamilton
2017–2021	Sean Werth	Ric Jackman
2021–present	Sean Werth	Dave Mooney

== Notable alumni ==
Blues

- Darrin Madeley
- Noah Bell
