= 2008–09 GMHL season =

- League: Greater Metro Junior A Hockey League
- Sport: Hockey
- Duration: Regular season 2008-09 – 2009-02; Playoffs; 2009-02 – 2009-04
- Teams: 15
- Finals champions: South Muskoka Shield

GMHL seasons
- 2007–08 2009–10

The 2008–09 GMHL season was the third season of the Greater Metro Junior A Hockey League (GMHL). The fifteen teams of the GMHL played 43-game schedules.

In February 2009, the top teams of the league played down for the Russell Cup, emblematic of the grand championship of the GMHL. Since the GMHL is independent from Hockey Canada and the Canadian Junior Hockey League, this is where the GMHL's season ended. The South Muskoka Shield won their first Russell Cup beating the Deseronto Storm 4-games-to-2.

== Changes ==
- Douro Dukes moved and become Brock Bucks
- Richmond Hill Rams become Ontario Lightning Rams
- Oro-Medonte 77's joined the league
- Ville-Marie Dragons joined the league
- Minden Riverkings joined the league
- Temiscaming Royals left the league for Northern Ontario Junior Hockey League
- Ville-Marie Dragons folded mid-season (January)
- Tamworth Cyclones folded mid-season (January)

With fifteen team starting the season, the league was split into a Northern Division (8 teams) and Southern Division (7 teams).

== Final standings ==
Note: GP = Games played; W = Wins; L = Losses; OTL = Overtime Losses; SL = Shootout Losses; GF = Goals For.

Northern Division
Team	Centre	W–L–T-OTL	GF	GA	Points
South Muskoka Shield	Gravenhurst	38-4-0-1	303	128	77
Elliot Lake Bobcats	Elliot Lake	31-8-0-4	276	119	66
Nipissing Alouettes	Sturgeon Falls	29-13-0-1	233	157	59
Oro-Medonte 77's	Guthrie	22-15-0-6	205	165	50
Minden Riverkings	Minden Hills	18-24-0-1	172	219	37
Brock Bucks	Beaverton	15-26-0-2	191	242	32
x-Espanola Kings	Espanola	8-34-0-1	110	334	17
x-Ville-Marie Dragons	Ville-Marie, PQ	2-24-0-0	71	286	4
Southern Division
Team	Centre	W–L–T-OTL	GF	GA	Points
Innisfil Lakers	Innisfil	36-6-0-1	286	130	73
Bradford Rattlers	Bradford	34-6-0-3	284	132	71
Deseronto Storm	Deseronto	29-11-0-3	224	121	61
King Wild	King City	26-15-0-2	241	200	54
Toronto Canada Moose	Thornhill	18-21-0-4	205	204	40
Ontario Lightning Rams	Richmond Hill	13-30-0-0	174	258	26
x-Tamworth Cyclones	Tamworth	3-24-0-2	86	290	8

Tamworth and Ville-Marie folded for the remainder of the season. Their remaining games are scored as 3-0 forfeit victories to their opponent.

(x-) denotes elimination from playoffs.

Teams listed on the official league website.

Standings listed on official league website.

== 2008–09 Russell Cup Playoffs ==
Quarter-finals	Semi-finals
N1	South Muskoka	3
N6	Brock	0
N1	South Muskoka	3
N3	Nipissing	0
N3	Nipissing	3
N4	Oro-Medonte	0
North
N2	Elliot Lake	3
N5	Minden	0
N2	Elliot Lake
--	Bye
S1	Innisfil	3
S6	Ontario	1
S1	Innisfil
--	Bye
South
S2	Bradford	3
S5	Toronto	2
S2	Bradford	1
S3	Deseronto	3
S3	Deseronto	3
S4	King	0

Division Finals
N1	South Muskoka	4
N2	Elliot Lake	1
S1	Innisfil	2
S3	Deseronto	4

Russell Cup Championship
N1	South Muskoka	4
S3	Deseronto	2

Playoff results are listed on the official league website.

== Torpedo UST-Kamenogorsk exhibition series ==
In late December 2008 and early January 2009, the teams of the GMHL played a series of exhibition games against the Torpedo Ust-Kamenogorsk Under-18 team of Oskemen, Kazakhstan.

South Muskoka Shield 5 - Torpedo Ust-Kamenogorsk 4
Torpedo Ust-Kamenogorsk 8 - Toronto Canada Moose 5
Innisfil Lakers 5 - Torpedo Ust-Kamenogorsk 3
Bradford Rattlers 6 - Torpedo Ust-Kamenogorsk 5
Elliot Lake Bobcats 5 - Torpedo Ust-Kamenogorsk 3
Nipissing/Ville-Marie 8 - Torpedo Ust-Kamenogorsk 5
King Wild 5 - Torpedo Ust-Kamenogorsk 4 (OT)
Elliot Lake Bobcats 5 - Torpedo Ust-Kamenogorsk 1

== Scoring leaders ==
Note: GP = Games played; G = Goals; A = Assists; Pts = Points; PIM = Penalty Minutes

Player	Team	GP	G	A	Pts	PIM
Andre Leclair	Nipissing Alouettes	41	49	61	110	111
Dylan Sontag	South Muskoka Shield	40	52	41	93	10
Travis Saltz	South Muskoka Shield	41	41	52	93	102
Maxwell Douglas	Innisfil Lakers	36	24	65	89	58
Brian Davidson	Innisfil Lakers	34	47	38	85	48
Connor Hendry	Innisfil Lakers	35	31	54	85	83
Robin Mendolsohn	Nipissing Alouettes	41	25	58	83	38
Jeff Morris	Deseronto Storm	38	29	49	78	50
Brendan Farrugia	King Wild	34	49	28	77	80
Steve Wicklum	King Wild	34	28	46	74	41

== Leading goaltenders ==
Note: GP = Games played; Mins = Minutes Played; W = Wins; L = Losses: OTL = Overtime Losses; SL = Shootout Losses; GA = Goals Allowed; SO = Shutouts; GAA = Goals Against Average

Player	Team	GP	Mins	W	L	GA	SO	GAA
Shane Buckley	Elliot Lake Bobcats	19	1067	12	7	44	3	2.47
Travis Elvin	Deseronto Storm	12	718	7	5	34	2	2.84
Geoffrey Sadjadi	Innisfil Lakers	17	930	14	3	45	1	2.90
Jens Kensell	Deseronto Storm	21	1284	14	7	62	0	2.90
Eric Pye	South Muskoka Shield	28	1636	26	2	81	2	2.97

== Awards ==
- Most Valuable Player - Brett Meyers (Minden Riverkings)
- Top Scorer - Adam Palm (Bradford Rattlers)
- Top Defenceman - Mitch Kriz (Elliot Lake Bobcats)
- Top Goaltender - Nikolajs Zurkovs (Brock Bucks)
- Top Forward - Travis Saltz (South Muskoka Shield)
- Rookie of the Year - Andre Leclair (Nipissing Alouettes)
- Most Heart - Matt Marchese (King Wild)
- Most Sportsmanlike Player - Dylan Sontag (South Muskoka Shield)
- Top Defensive Forward - Chad Meagher (South Muskoka Shield)
- Coach of the Year - Matt Barnhardt (Deseronto Storm)
- Official of the Year - Dave Avery

== See also ==
- 2008 in ice hockey
- 2009 in ice hockey

Preceded by 2007–08 GMHL season	GMHL seasons	Succeeded by 2009–10 GMHL season
