= 2011–12 NOJHL season =

- League: Northern Ontario Junior Hockey League
- Sport: Hockey
- Duration: Regular season 2011-09-07 – 2012-02-29; Playoffs; 2012-03-02 – 2012-04-10
- Teams: 7
- Finals champions: Soo Thunderbirds

NOJHL seasons
- 2010–11 2012–13

The 2011–12 NOJHL season is the 34th season of the Northern Ontario Junior Hockey League (NOJHL). The seven teams of the East and West Divisions will play 50-game schedules.

Come February, the top teams of each division will play down for the Copeland-McNamara Trophy, the NOJHL championship. The winner of the Copeland-McNamara Trophy will compete in the Central Canadian Junior "A" championship, the Dudley Hewitt Cup. If successful against the winners of the Ontario Junior Hockey League and Superior International Junior Hockey League, the champion would then move on to play in the Canadian Junior Hockey League championship, the 2012 Royal Bank Cup.

== Changes ==
- Sudbury Jr. Wolves change their name to the Sudbury Cubs.
- Manitoulin Islanders move to Kirkland Lake, Ontario and become Kirkland Lake Blue Devils.
- Temiscaming Royals ceased operations.
- Kirkland Lake Blue Devils (7-28-1) are sold mid-season and renamed Kirkland Lake Gold Miners.

== Current Standings ==
Note: GP = Games played; W = Wins; L = Losses; OTL = Overtime losses; SL = Shootout losses; GF = Goals for; GA = Goals against; PTS = Points; x = clinched playoff berth; y = clinched division title; z = clinched conference title

Eastern Division
Team	Centre	W–L–OTL	GF–GA	Points
Sudbury Cubs	Sudbury, Ontario	29-15-6	283-229	64
Abitibi Eskimos	Iroquois Falls, Ontario	28-18-4	241-222	60
North Bay Trappers	North Bay, Ontario	29-21-0	215-187	58
Kirkland Lake Gold Miners	Kirkland Lake, Ontario	9-39-2	138-288	20
Western Division
Team	Centre	W–L–OTL	GF–GA	Points
Soo Thunderbirds	Sault Ste. Marie, Ontario	37-11-2	245-156	76
Soo Eagles	Sault Ste. Marie, Michigan	36-10-4	290-171	74
Blind River Beavers	Blind River, Ontario	8-40-2	117-276	18

Teams listed on the official league website.

Standings listed on official league website.

== 2011-12 Copeland-McNamara Trophy Playoffs ==
Quarter-finals
E1	Sudbury	4
E4	Kirkland Lake	0
East
E2	Abitibi	1
E3	North Bay	4
West

Semi-finals
E1	Sudbury	3
E3	North Bay	4
W1	Soo Thunderbirds	4
W2	Soo Eagles	0

McNamara Trophy Finals
E3	North Bay	1
W1	Soo Thunderbirds	4

=== West Semi-final round robin ===
Team	W–L–OTL	GF–GA	Points
x-Soo Thunderbirds	3-0-1	26-13	7
x-Soo Eagles	3-0-1	22-12	7
Blind River Beavers	0-4-0	5-28	0

Playoff results are listed on the official league website.

== Dudley Hewitt Cup Championship ==
Hosted by the Thunder Bay North Stars in Thunder Bay, Ontario. The Soo Thunderbirds won the tournament and move on to the 2012 Royal Bank Cup.

Round Robin

Soo Thunderbirds 4 - Wisconsin Wilderness (SIJHL) 3 in overtime
Soo Thunderbirds 4 - Thunder Bay North Stars (SIJHL) 3
Stouffville Spirit (OJHL) 10 - Soo Thunderbirds 2

Semi-final

Soo Thunderbirds 8 - Thunder Bay North Stars (SIJHL) 5

Final

Soo Thunderbirds 5 - Stouffville Spirit (OJHL) 3

== 2012 Royal Bank Cup Championship ==
Hosted by the Humboldt Broncos in Humboldt Broncos. Soo Thunderbirds finished second in the round robin but were eliminated in the semi-final.

Round Robin

Soo Thunderbirds 2 - Penticton Vees (BCHL) 1
Portage Terriers (MJHL) 4 - Soo Thunderbirds 3 in double overtime
Humboldt Broncos (SJHL) 3 - Soo Thunderbirds 0
Soo Thunderbirds 7 - Woodstock Slammers (MHL) 4

Semi-final

Penticton Vees (BCHL) 3 - Soo Thunderbirds 0

== Scoring leaders ==
Note: GP = Games played; G = Goals; A = Assists; Pts = Points; PIM = Penalty minutes

Player	Team	GP	G	A	Pts	PIM
Jordan Carroll	Sudbury Cubs	50	70	66	136	26
Marc-Alain Begin	Abitibi Eskimos	39	31	92	123	29
Jamie Haines	Sudbury Cubs	42	39	68	107	74
Micky Sartoretto	Soo Thunderbirds	45	43	54	97	40
Nick Esposto	Sudbury Cubs	35	34	60	94	68
Richard Therrien	Abitibi Eskimos	48	44	47	91	48
Brian Depp	Soo Eagles	48	40	45	85	32
Matt Amadio	Soo Thunderbirds	45	30	48	78	16
Dallas McLaughlin	Soo Eagles	48	36	31	67	67
Shane Totten	Soo Eagles	50	27	40	67	46

== Leading goaltenders ==
Note: GP = Games played; Mins = Minutes played; W = Wins; L = Losses: OTL = Overtime losses; SL = Shootout losses; GA = Goals Allowed; SO = Shutouts; GAA = Goals against average

Player	Team	GP	Mins	W	L	T	GA	SO	Sv%	GAA
John Kleinhans	Soo Thunderbirds	37	2159:16	26	9	0	103	5	0.912	2.86
Chris Truehl	Soo Eagles	20	1140:34	14	3	1	63	0	0.907	3.31
Alex Laino	Sudbury Cubs	26	1519:35	13	9	3	109	0	0.898	4.30
Luis Puig	Soo Eagles	18	948:31	11	4	2	59	2	0.894	3.73
JP Fecteau	Abitibi Eskimos	42	2301:44	21	13	3	163	0	0.893	4.25

== Players selected in 2012 NHL entry draft ==
To be decided after season ends.

== Awards ==
To be decided after season ends.

== See also ==
- 2012 Royal Bank Cup
- Dudley Hewitt Cup
- List of NOHA Junior A seasons
- Ontario Junior Hockey League
- Superior International Junior Hockey League
- Greater Ontario Junior Hockey League

Preceded by 2010–11 NOJHL season	NOJHL seasons	Succeeded by 2012–13 NOJHL season
