= 2008–09 NOJHL season =

- League: Northern Ontario Junior Hockey League
- Sport: Hockey
- Duration: Regular season 2008-09-09 – 2009-03-03; Playoffs; 2009-03-06 – 2009-04-15
- Teams: 8
- Finals champions: Soo Thunderbirds

NOJHL seasons
- 2007–08 2009–10

The 2008–09 NOJHL season was the 31st season of the Northern Ontario Junior Hockey League (NOJHL). The eight teams of the East and West Divisions played 50-game schedules.

The top teams of each division played for the Copeland-McNamara Trophy, the NOJHL championship. The winner of the Copeland-McNamara Trophy competed in the Central Canadian Junior "A" championship, the Dudley Hewitt Cup.

== Changes ==
- Temiscaming Royals join league from Greater Metro Junior A Hockey League.
- Soo re-enters league as Soo Eagles.

== Final standings ==
Note: GP = Games played; W = Wins; L = Losses; OTL = Overtime losses; SL = Shootout losses; GF = Goals for; GA = Goals against; PTS = Points; x = clinched playoff berth; y = clinched division title; z = clinched conference title

Eastern Division
Team	Centre	W–L–T-OTL	GF	GA	Points
North Bay Skyhawks	North Bay	41-6-0-3	251	151	85
Abitibi Eskimos	Iroquois Falls	29-17-0-4	198	166	62
Sudbury Jr. Wolves	Garson	20-25-0-5	207	238	45
Temiscaming Royals	Temiscaming, PQ	17-29-0-4	173	238	38
Western Division
Team	Centre	W–L–T-OTL	GF	GA	Points
Soo Thunderbirds	Sault Ste. Marie, ON	35-14-0-1	244	153	71
Soo Eagles	Sault Ste. Marie, MI	26-21-0-3	257	209	55
Blind River Beavers	Blind River	25-21-0-4	188	182	54
Manitoulin Islanders	Little Current	7-40-0-3	141	322	17

Teams listed on the official league website.

Standings listed on official league website.

== 2008-09 Copeland-McNamara Trophy Playoffs ==
Quarter-finals
E1	North Bay	4
E4	Temiscaming	0
East
E2	Abitibi	4
E3	Sudbury	1
W1	SSM Thunderbirds	4
W4	Manitoulin	0
West
W2	SSM Eagles	0
W3	Blind River	4

Semi-finals
E1	North Bay	4
E2	Abitibi	3
W1	SSM Thunderbirds	4
W3	Blind River	0

McNamara Trophy Finals
E1	North Bay	1
W1	SSM Thunderbirds	4

Playoff results are listed on the official league website.

== Dudley Hewitt Cup Championship ==
Hosted by the Schreiber Diesels in Schreiber, Ontario. Soo finished in fourth.

Round Robin

Fort William North Stars (SIJHL) 2 - Soo Thunderbirds 0
Schreiber Diesels (SIJHL) 2 - Soo Thunderbirds 0
Kingston Voyageurs (OJHL) 3 - Soo Thunderbirds 0

== Scoring leaders ==
Note: GP = Games played; G = Goals; A = Assists; Pts = Points; PIM = Penalty minutes

Player	Team	GP	G	A	Pts	PIM
Dustin Fummerton	North Bay Skyhawks	47	32	51	83	37
Chris Kangas	Sudbury Jr. Wolves	48	39	38	77	46
Trevor McNutt	Soo Thunderbirds	49	28	47	75	6
Nick Minardi	Soo Thunderbirds	45	36	36	72	87
Solomon McCann	North Bay Skyhawks	44	42	28	70	27
Jeff Verrault	Sudbury Jr. Wolves	48	28	41	69	47
R.J. Kleiman	Soo Eagles	46	31	35	66	30
Zak LaRue	Soo Thunderbirds	50	33	32	65	53
Erik Belanger	Sudbury Jr. Wolves	47	29	36	65	92
Marc-Alain Begin	Abitibi Eskimos	49	22	40	62	14

== Leading goaltenders ==
Note: GP = Games played; Mins = Minutes played; W = Wins; L = Losses: OTL = Overtime losses; SL = Shootout losses; GA = Goals Allowed; SO = Shutouts; GAA = Goals against average

Player	Team	GP	Mins	W	L	T	GA	SO	Sv%	GAA
Billy Stone	Blind River Beavers	28	1683:15	14	14	0	92	1	0.919	3.28
Randy Willis	Blind River Beavers	19	1098:51	11	7	0	62	0	0.916	3.39
Jeff Michael	North Bay Skyhawks	29	1670:22	23	3	2	74	2	0.908	2.66
Francis Albert	Abitibi Eskimos	27	1337:47	12	10	1	69	1	0.905	3.09
Joel Vienneau	Abitibi Eskimos	30	1692:29	17	8	2	90	2	0.900	3.19

== Awards ==
- Player of the Year - Nick Minardi (Soo Thunderbirds)
- Most Valuable Player - Nick Minardi (Soo Thunderbirds)
- Most Gentlemanly Player - Tyler Liukkonen (Blind River Beavers)
- Rookie of the Year - Erik Belanger (Sudbury Jr. Wolves)
- Top Defenceman - Drew Otto (Soo Thunderbirds)
- Most Improved Player - Tanner Burton (Blind River Beavers)
- Top Defensive Forward - Gerrit Weller (Blind River Beavers)
- Top "Team Player" - Felix Boutin (Abitibi Eskimos)
- Director of the Year - Oscar Cloutier (Sudbury Jr. Wolves)
- Coach of the Year - Ian Swalucynski (North Bay Skyhawks)
- Team Goaltending Award - Jeff Michael, Riley Ross (North Bay Skyhawks)
- Top Goals Against Average - Jeff Michael (North Bay Skyhawks)
- Scoring Champion - Dustin Fummerton (North Bay Skyhawks)
- Scholastic Player of the Year - Giles Pickard (Blind River Beavers)
- Playoffs Most Valuable Player - Ryan Dube (Soo Thunderbirds)

== See also ==
- 2009 Royal Bank Cup
- Dudley Hewitt Cup
- List of NOHA Junior A seasons
- Ontario Junior Hockey League
- Superior International Junior Hockey League
- Greater Ontario Junior Hockey League

Preceded by 2007–08 NOJHL season	NOJHL seasons	Succeeded by 2009–10 NOJHL season
