= 2009–10 NOJHL season =

- League: Northern Ontario Junior Hockey League
- Sport: Hockey
- Duration: Regular season 2009-09-09 – 2010-03-03; Playoffs; 2010-03-06 – 2010-04-15
- Teams: 8
- Finals champions: Abitibi Eskimos

NOJHL seasons
- 2008–09 2010–11

The 2009–10 NOJHL season is the 32nd season of the Northern Ontario Junior Hockey League (NOJHL). The eight teams of the East and West Divisions will play 50-game schedules.

Come February, the top teams of each division will play down for the Copeland-McNamara Trophy, the NOJHL championship. The winner of the Copeland-McNamara Trophy will compete in the Central Canadian Junior "A" championship, the Dudley Hewitt Cup. If successful against the winners of the Ontario Junior Hockey League and Superior International Junior Hockey League, the champion would then move on to play in the Canadian Junior Hockey League championship, the 2010 Royal Bank Cup.

== Changes ==
- North Bay Skyhawks change their name to North Bay Trappers.

== Current Standings ==
Note: GP = Games played; W = Wins; L = Losses; OTL = Overtime losses; SL = Shootout losses; GF = Goals for; GA = Goals against; PTS = Points; x = clinched playoff berth; y = clinched division title; z = clinched conference title

Eastern Division
Team	Centre	W–L–T-OTL	GF	GA	Points
Abitibi Eskimos	Iroquois Falls	40-7-0-3	263	141	83
North Bay Trappers	North Bay	34-14-0-2	227	161	70
Sudbury Jr. Wolves	Copper Cliff	19-27-0-4	186	216	42
Temiscaming Royals	Temiscaming, QC	14-32-0-4	178	252	32
Western Division
Team	Centre	W–L–T-OTL	GF	GA	Points
Soo Thunderbirds	Sault Ste. Marie, ON	33-14-0-3	253	154	69
Blind River Beavers	Blind River	29-14-0-7	239	205	65
Soo Eagles	Sault Ste. Marie, MI	27-18-0-5	224	213	59
Manitoulin Islanders	Little Current	4-45-0-1	131	359	9

Teams listed on the official league website.

Standings listed on official league website.

== 2009-10 Copeland-McNamara Trophy Playoffs ==
Quarter-finals
E1	Abitibi	4
E4	Temiscaming	1
East
E2	North Bay	1
E3	Sudbury	4
W1	Soo Thunderbirds	4
W4	Manitoulin	0
West
W2	Blind River	1
W3	Soo Eagles	4

Semi-finals
E1	Abitibi	4
E3	Sudbury	1
W1	Soo Thunderbirds	4
W3	Soo Eagles	0

McNamara Trophy Finals
E1	Abitibi	4
W1	Soo Thunderbirds	3

Playoff results are listed on the official league website.

== Dudley Hewitt Cup Championship ==
Hosted by the Soo Thunderbirds in Sault Ste. Marie, Ontario. Soo finished in third, Abitibi finished fourth.

Round Robin

Oakville Blades (OJAHL) 6 - Abitibi Eskimos 0
Fort William North Stars (SIJHL) 3 - Soo Thunderbirds 2 OT
Abitibi Eskimos 4 - Fort William North Stars 3 OT
Oakville Blades (OJAHL) 3 - Soo Thunderbirds 1
Soo Thunderbirds 4 - Abitibi Eskimos 3

Semi-final

Fort William North Stars (SIJHL) 3 - Soo Thunderbirds 0

== Scoring leaders ==
Note: GP = Games played; G = Goals; A = Assists; Pts = Points; PIM = Penalty minutes

Player	Team	GP	G	A	Pts	PIM
Felix Boutin	Abitibi Eskimos	49	36	63	99	34
Marc-Alain Begin	Abitibi Eskimos	40	39	59	98	23
Brett Findlay	Blind River Beavers	50	28	59	87	51
Chris Kangas	Sudbury Jr. Wolves	49	35	50	85	100
Joshua Clancy	Abitibi Eskimos	48	42	42	84	28
Matt Dozois	Blind River Beavers	44	19	51	70	29
Aaron Leonard	Soo Eagles	48	22	45	67	28
Drew MacMillan	Blind River Beavers	44	26	40	66	8
Erik Belanger	Sudbury Jr. Wolves	47	22	44	66	107
Ryan McAleese	Soo Eagles	48	29	35	64	41

== Leading goaltenders ==
Note: GP = Games played; Mins = Minutes played; W = Wins; L = Losses: OTL = Overtime losses; SL = Shootout losses; GA = Goals Allowed; SO = Shutouts; GAA = Goals against average

Player	Team	GP	Mins	W	L	T	GA	SO	Sv%	GAA
Eddie Davey	Abitibi Eskimos	45	2615:13	38	4	2	108	2	0.925	2.48
John Kleinhans	Soo Eagles	31	1661:41	16	11	1	106	1	0.912	3.83
Eric Pye	Soo Thunderbirds	12	668:59	8	2	0	26	3	0.911	2.33
Sam Foley	Blind River Beavers	20	1158:03	14	4	1	67	0	0.908	3.47
Michael Mitchell	North Bay Trappers	33	1770:57	20	9	1	88	2	0.901	2.98

== Awards ==
- Player of the Year - Felix Boutin (Abitibi Eskimos)
- Most Valuable Player - Eddie Davey (Abitibi Eskimos)
- Most Gentlemanly Player - Chris Pontes (Sudbury Jr. Wolves)
- Rookie of the Year - Brett Findlay (Blind River Beavers)
- Top Defenceman - Bronson Kovacs (Soo Thunderbirds)
- Most Improved Player - Mathew Pepin (North Bay Trappers)
- Top Defensive Forward - Brodie Barron (North Bay Trappers)
- Top "Team Player" - Jerry Petingalo (Soo Thunderbirds)
- Director of the Year - Al Jones (Soo Thunderbirds)
- Coach of the Year - Paul Gagne (Abitibi Eskimos)
- Team Goaltending Award - Eddie Davey, Chandler Long (Abitibi Eskimos)
- Top Goals Against Average - Eddie Davey (Abitibi Eskimos)
- Scoring Champion - Felix Boutin (Soo Thunderbirds)
- Scholastic Player of the Year - Bronson Kovacs (Soo Thunderbirds)
- Playoffs Most Valuable Player - Matt St. Jacques (Abitibi Eskimos)

== See also ==
- 2010 Royal Bank Cup
- Dudley Hewitt Cup
- List of NOHA Junior A seasons
- Ontario Junior Hockey League
- Superior International Junior Hockey League
- Greater Ontario Junior Hockey League

Preceded by 2008–09 NOJHL season	NOJHL seasons	Succeeded by 2010–11 NOJHL season
