= Brett Perlini =

English-Canadian ice hockey player

- Born: 14 June 1990 (age 36) Sault Ste. Marie, Ontario, Canada
- Height: 1.88 m (6 ft 2 in)
- Weight: 91 kg (201 lb; 14 st 5 lb)
- Position: Forward
- Shoots: Left
- EIHL team Former teams: Coventry Blaze; Lake Erie Monsters; HC Pustertal Wölfe; Nottingham Panthers; Ringerike Panthers; Herning Blue Fox; Saale Bulls Halle; Cardiff Devils
- National team: Great Britain
- NHL draft: 192nd overall, 2010; Anaheim Ducks
- Playing career: 2012–present

Brett Perlini (born 14 June 1990) is a Canadian-born English professional ice hockey player who is a forward for the Coventry Blaze of the Elite Ice Hockey League (EIHL).

== International play ==
He represented Great Britain at the 2019 IIHF World Championship, 2021 IIHF World Championship, 2022 IIHF World Championship and 2024 IIHF World Championship.

== Personal life ==
His brother Brendan Perlini is a player for Lausanne HC of the National League (NL).

== Career statistics ==
=== Regular season and playoffs ===
			Regular season					Playoffs
Season	Team	League	GP	G	A	Pts	PIM	GP	G	A	Pts	PIM
2004–05	Soo Greyhounds U15 AAA	NOHL U15	34	28	35	63	8	5	2	1	3	2
2005–06	Sault Ste. Marie North Stars Midget AAA	GNML	36	20	20	40	6	10	5	6	11	4
2006–07	Soo Thunderbirds	NOJHL	48	38	19	57	20	12	6	6	12	6
2007–08	Ohio Junior Blue Jackets	USHL	19	1	4	5	0	—	—	—	—	—
2007–08	Soo Thunderbirds	NOJHL	16	16	16	32	12	6	4	3	7	6
2008–09	Michigan State University	NCAA	26	2	1	3	4	—	—	—	—	—
2009–10	Michigan State University	NCAA	20	7	5	12	10	—	—	—	—	—
2010–11	Michigan State University	NCAA	38	18	12	30	12	—	—	—	—	—
2011–12	Michigan State University	NCAA	39	9	22	31	22	—	—	—	—	—
2012–13	Bakersfield Condors	ECHL	39	7	13	20	14	—	—	—	—	—
2012–13	Lake Erie Monsters	AHL	2	0	0	0	2	—	—	—	—	—
2013–14	Greenville Road Warriors	ECHL	17	2	3	5	2	—	—	—	—	—
2013–14	Toledo Walleye	ECHL	35	8	5	13	10	—	—	—	—	—
2014–15	Indy Fuel	ECHL	12	2	3	5	4	—	—	—	—	—
2014–15	Fort Wayne Komets	ECHL	57	17	14	31	8	9	2	3	5	0
2015–16	Fort Wayne Komets	ECHL	52	15	19	34	8	13	3	6	9	6
2016–17	Rapid City Rush	ECHL	25	9	3	12	8	—	—	—	—	—
2016–17	Wichita Thunder	ECHL	2	0	0	0	2	—	—	—	—	—
2016–17	Fort Wayne Komets	ECHL	33	14	12	26	12	4	0	0	0	0
2017–18	Nottingham Panthers	EIHL	56	19	35	54	10	4	1	1	2	0
2018–19	Nottingham Panthers	EIHL	59	15	21	36	37	3	1	2	3	0
2019–20	Nottingham Panthers	EIHL	38	17	14	31	8	—	—	—	—	—
2020–21	HC Pustertal Wölfe	AlpsHL	31	13	25	38	4	2	0	0	0	2
2020–21	HC Pustertal Wölfe	Italy	3	0	1	1	2	—	—	—	—	—
2020–21	Nottingham Panthers	EIHL Series	13	4	10	14	6	—	—	—	—	—
2021–22	Ringerike Panthers	Norway	37	23	12	35	10	4	0	0	0	0
2022–23	Herning Blue Fox	Metal Ligaen	33	13	17	30	2	18	5	7	12	4
2023–24	Saale Bulls Halle	Oberliga	38	24	29	53	8	5	1	1	2	0
2024–25	Cardiff Devils	EIHL	44	16	12	28	2	4	0	2	2	0
2025–26	Cardiff Devils	EIHL	54	13	22	35	4	4	0	1	1	0
AHL totals			2	0	0	0	2	—	—	—	—	—
EIHL totals			251	80	104	184	61	15	2	6	8	0

=== International ===
Year	Team	Event	GP	G	A	Pts	PIM
2018	Great Britain	WC (D1A)	5	4	2	6	2
2019	Great Britain	WC	7	1	0	1	0
2020	Great Britain	OGQ	3	2	0	2	0
2021	Great Britain	WC	7	0	1	1	2
2022	Great Britain	WC	7	2	2	4	0
2023	Great Britain	WC (D1A)	5	3	1	4	0
2024	Great Britain	WC	7	2	2	4	0
2024	Great Britain	OGQ	6	4	0	4	0
2025	Great Britain	WC (D1A)	5	1	5	6	0
2026	Great Britain	WC	7	0	2	2	0
Senior totals			59	19	15	34	4
