= Jake Muzzin =

Canadian ice hockey player (born 1989)

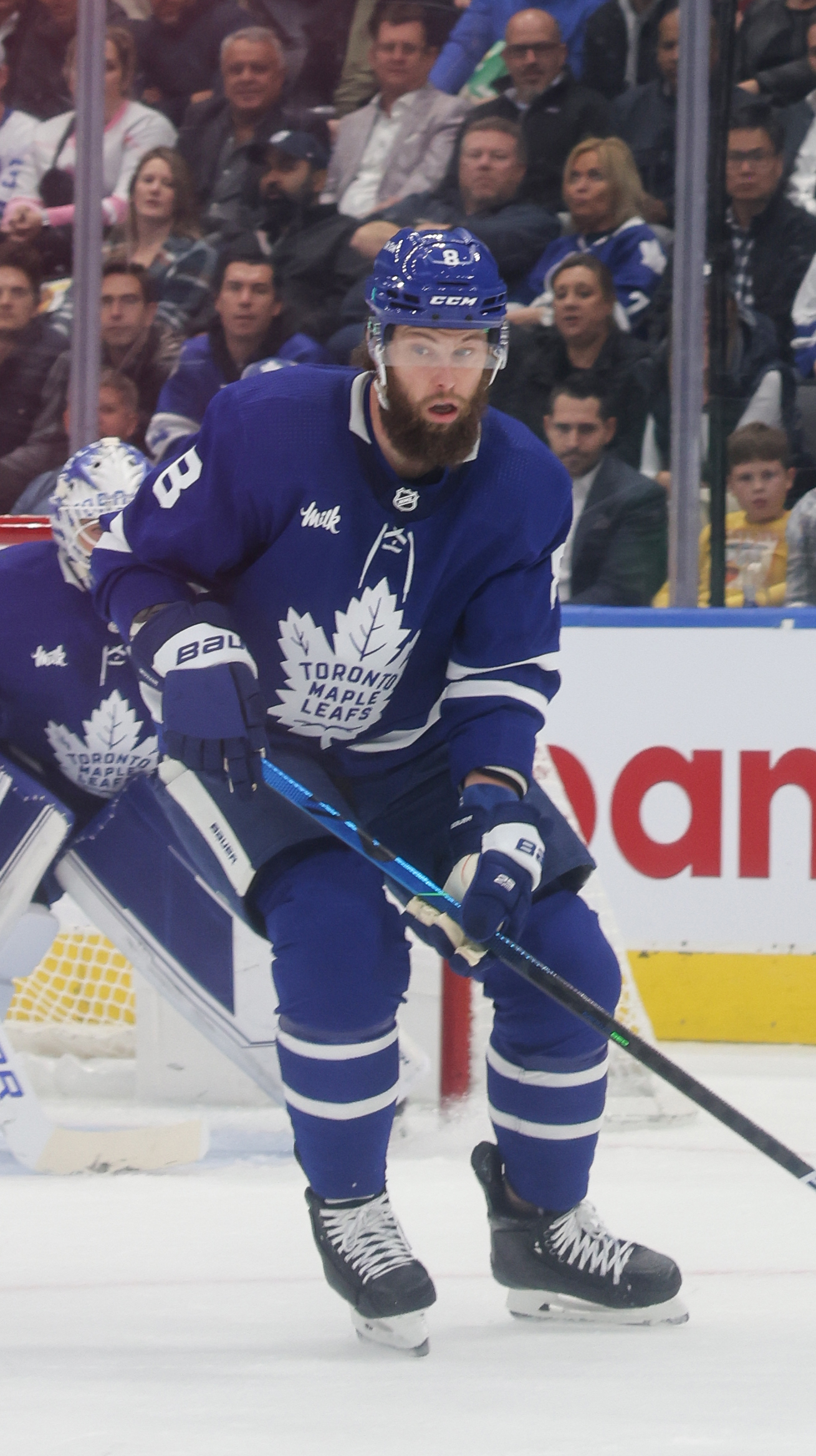
- Muzzin with the Toronto Maple Leafs in 2022
- Born: February 21, 1989 (age 37) Woodstock, Ontario, Canada
- Height: 6 ft 3 in (191 cm)
- Weight: 214 lb (97 kg; 15 st 4 lb)
- Position: Defence
- Shot: Left
- Played for: Los Angeles Kings; Toronto Maple Leafs
- National team: Canada
- NHL draft: 141st overall, 2007; Pittsburgh Penguins
- Playing career: 2010–2022

Jacob Muzzin (born February 21, 1989) is a Canadian former professional ice hockey defenceman and current member of the Player Development department for the Toronto Maple Leafs of the National Hockey League (NHL). He previously had played 12 seasons in the NHL for the Los Angeles Kings and Maple Leafs. Originally drafted by the Pittsburgh Penguins in the 2007 NHL entry draft, Muzzin went unsigned and returned to the Sault Ste. Marie Greyhounds of the Ontario Hockey League (OHL) as an overage player. There he served as team captain and won the Max Kaminsky Trophy as the top defenceman in the OHL. As a free agent, Muzzin signed with the Kings in 2010, winning a Stanley Cup with the team in 2014. Muzzin was traded to Toronto during the 2018–19 season, where he played parts of five seasons. After a spinal injury suffered in 2022 resulted in his placement on long-term injured reserve, Muzzin joined the Maple Leafs' front office as a professional scout in 2023.

Internationally, he represented Canada at the 2015 IIHF World Championship and 2016 World Cup of Hockey, winning gold in both tournaments.

== Playing career ==
=== Junior ===
Muzzin played his early minor hockey in the Woodstock Minor Hockey Association before moving on to play AAA in Brantford, Ontario. He had previously played both soccer and hockey but at the age of 13 he committed to hockey.

Muzzin was the first pick, 11th overall, by the Sault Ste. Marie Greyhounds of the Ontario Hockey League (OHL) in the 2005 OHL Priority Selection Draft from the Brantford 99'ers Minor Midgets. He did not play with the Greyhounds until late in 2006 after he required herniated disc surgery at age 16. Despite having played only 37 regular season games and 13 playoff games, he was drafted 141st overall in the 2007 NHL entry draft by the Pittsburgh Penguins. Although he was drafted, he went unsigned by the Penguins and re-entered the 2009 NHL entry draft but was not picked and returned for an overage year with the Greyhounds. In his final season in the OHL, Muzzin was named team captain and selected for the 2010 OHL All-Star Classic. Muzzin also won the Max Kaminsky Trophy for top defenceman in the league.

=== Professional ===
==== Los Angeles Kings ====
Muzzin signed as a free agent to a three-year, entry-level contract with the Los Angeles Kings on January 4, 2010.

Following the Kings' training camp and pre-season games, Muzzin made the Kings' opening night roster for the 2010–11 season. However, on November 3, 2010, he was assigned to the Kings' American Hockey League (AHL) affiliate, the Manchester Monarchs. Just six days later, on November 9, the Kings recalled Muzzin for a brief stint before again reassigning him to the Monarchs on November 23.

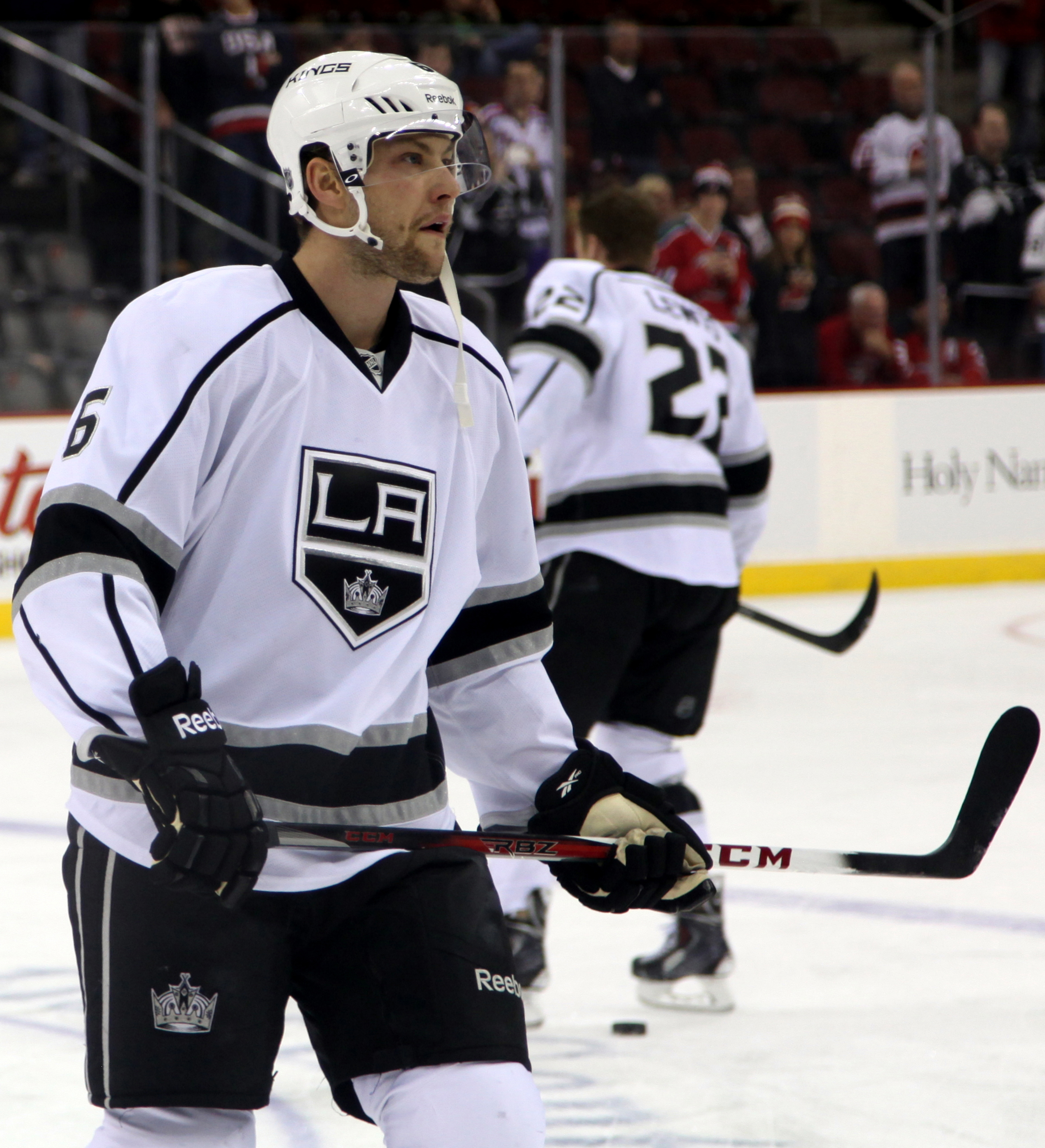
Muzzin with the Los Angeles Kings in 2013.

In 2012, Muzzin was recalled during the 2012 Stanley Cup playoffs as a Black Ace, and was on the roster as a healthy scratch when they won the Stanley Cup over the New Jersey Devils. He did not appear in any games that season. Although he did not qualify to have his name engraved on the Stanley Cup, he was nonetheless included in the team's celebratory picture.

Muzzin scored his first NHL goal in his third game following the 2012–13 NHL lockout on January 26, 2013, against Jason LaBarbera of the Phoenix Coyotes. He went on to become a regular in the Kings' lineup and scored 7 goals and 9 assists in 45 regular season games, while adding 3 assists in 17 playoff games. He was also named NHL Rookie of the Month for March 2013.

On July 12, 2013, Muzzin and the Kings agreed to a two-year contract extension.

At the beginning of the 2013–14 season, Muzzin began as a third line pairing and was a healthy scratch for a series of games. However, he quickly continued to develop and, after being paired with defensive star Drew Doughty, he continued to earn more playing time on the top defensive pairing. Muzzin continued to earn minutes for the Kings and finished the regular season averaging 19:01 minutes per game, in addition to registering 5 goals and 19 assists in 76 regular season games. In the 2014 playoffs, he scored 6 goals and 6 assists in 26 games, averaging 23:23 minutes of ice time per game, including 37:18 in game five of the 2014 Stanley Cup Final against the New York Rangers.

On October 15, 2014, Muzzin signed a five-year contract extension with the Kings. He went on to have a career-high 41 points in 76 games that season.

On January 6, 2018, Muzzin was placed on injured reserve by the Kings. He was activated from injured reserve on January 18 after missing three games. During the 2018 playoffs, due to an upper-body injury, Muzzin played in only two games in a 4–0 series loss to the Vegas Golden Knights.

==== Toronto Maple Leafs ====
On January 28, 2019, with the Kings one point from last place in the league standings, Muzzin was traded to the Toronto Maple Leafs in exchange for forward Carl Grundström, the playing rights to Sean Durzi, and Toronto's first-round pick in the 2019 NHL entry draft. He finished the season with 37 points, split between the Kings and Leafs.

On February 24, 2020, Muzzin agreed to a four-year, $22.5 million contract extension with the Maple Leafs.

During the 2021–22 season, Muzzin suffered two concussions within a span of a month. The first concussion occurred on January 15, 2022, in a game against the St. Louis Blues, when Muzzin was checked into the boards by Blues forward Klim Kostin. He missed seven games as a result. The second happened after a collision with Chris Wideman of the Montreal Canadiens on February 21, 2022 (his 33rd birthday). Muzzin did not return to the ice until April 2022 and played for the Leafs in the playoffs.

The following season, after appearing in only four games, Muzzin injured his spine after colliding with Arizona Coyotes forward Clayton Keller, and was placed on the injured reserve once again. He was later ruled out for the rest of the season on February 22, 2023.

Muzzin remained on injured reserve to start the 2023–24 season, with new Maple Leafs general manager Brad Treliving confirming in late September 2023 that Muzzin would miss the entire season due to his spinal injury suffered the prior year. Despite not officially retiring, Muzzin later joined the Maple Leafs' front office in early October as a professional scout. He was elevated the following year to their player development division.

== International play ==
Muzzin has represented Canada national team at the 2015 IIHF World Championship and 2016 World Cup of Hockey, winning gold in both competitions.

== Personal life ==
Muzzin is the son of Ed and Judy Muzzin and is of Italian and Dutch descent. He became engaged to Courtney Fischer in December 2015, and they married on August 5, 2016, in London, Ontario. They have one child together, a daughter born in April 2019.

== Career statistics ==
=== Regular season and playoffs ===
			Regular season					Playoffs
Season	Team	League	GP	G	A	Pts	PIM	GP	G	A	Pts	PIM
2004–05	Brantford 99'ers AAA	AH U16	57	20	23	43	78	12	1	2	3	34
2006–07	Soo Thunderbirds	NOJHL	4	0	3	3	2	—	—	—	—	—
2006–07	Sault Ste. Marie Greyhounds	OHL	37	1	3	4	10	13	0	4	4	6
2007–08	Sault Ste. Marie Greyhounds	OHL	67	6	12	18	53	10	1	3	4	4
2008–09	Sault Ste. Marie Greyhounds	OHL	62	6	23	29	57	—	—	—	—	—
2009–10	Sault Ste. Marie Greyhounds	OHL	64	15	52	67	76	5	0	1	1	2
2009–10	Manchester Monarchs	AHL	1	0	1	1	0	13	1	3	4	6
2010–11	Manchester Monarchs	AHL	45	3	15	18	39	7	3	1	4	2
2010–11	Los Angeles Kings	NHL	11	0	1	1	0	—	—	—	—	—
2011–12	Manchester Monarchs	AHL	71	7	24	31	40	3	0	1	1	2
2012–13	Manchester Monarchs	AHL	29	2	9	11	24	—	—	—	—	—
2012–13	Los Angeles Kings	NHL	45	7	9	16	35	17	0	3	3	6
2013–14	Los Angeles Kings	NHL	76	5	19	24	58	26	6	6	12	8
2014–15	Los Angeles Kings	NHL	76	10	31	41	22	—	—	—	—	—
2015–16	Los Angeles Kings	NHL	82	8	32	40	64	5	1	4	5	2
2016–17	Los Angeles Kings	NHL	82	9	19	28	46	—	—	—	—	—
2017–18	Los Angeles Kings	NHL	74	8	34	42	40	2	0	0	0	2
2018–19	Los Angeles Kings	NHL	50	4	17	21	33	—	—	—	—	—
2018–19	Toronto Maple Leafs	NHL	30	5	11	16	14	7	0	2	2	2
2019–20	Toronto Maple Leafs	NHL	53	6	17	23	40	2	0	0	0	2
2019–20	Toronto Marlies	AHL	1	0	0	0	0	—	—	—	—	—
2020–21	Toronto Maple Leafs	NHL	53	4	23	27	29	6	2	1	3	0
2021–22	Toronto Maple Leafs	NHL	47	3	11	14	16	7	2	1	3	2
2022–23	Toronto Maple Leafs	NHL	4	0	1	1	2	—	—	—	—	—
NHL totals			683	69	225	294	399	72	11	17	28	24

Medal record

Representing Canada

Ice hockey

World Championships
Gold medal – first place	2015 Czech Republic	

Canada Cup / World Cup
Gold medal – first place	2016 Toronto	

=== International ===
Year	Team	Event	Result	GP	G	A	Pts	PIM
2015	Canada	WC	1st place, gold medalist(s)	10	0	9	9	4
2016	Canada	WCH	1st place, gold medalist(s)	1	0	0	0	0
Senior totals				11	0	9	9	4

== Awards and honours ==
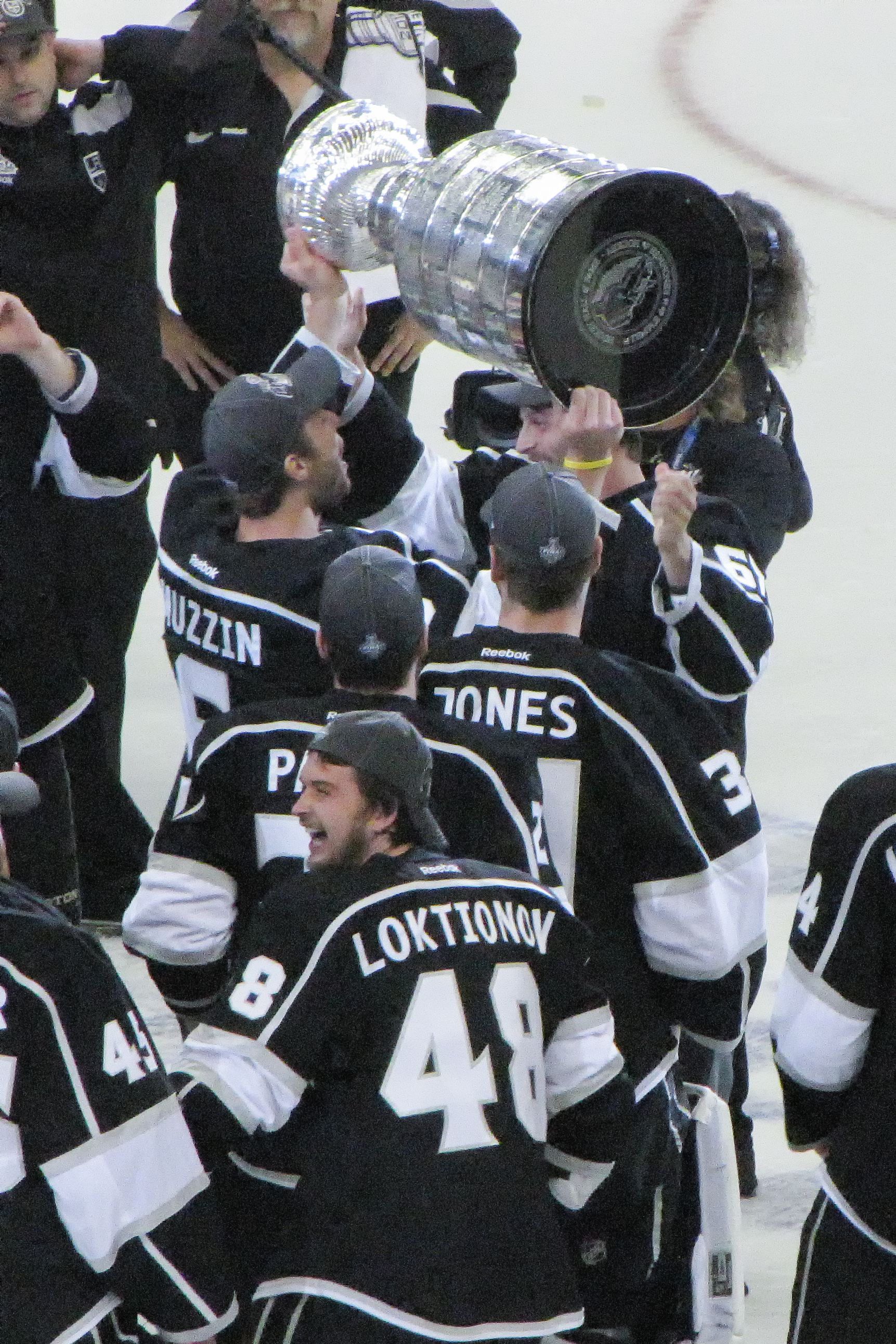
Muzzin lifts the Stanley Cup shortly after the 2012 Stanley Cup Final.

Award	Year
OHL
First All-Star Team	2010
Max Kaminsky Trophy	2010
CHL First All-Star Team	2010
NHL
Rookie of the Month	2013
Stanley Cup champion	2014
