= 2006–07 GMHL season =

- League: Greater Metro Junior A Hockey League
- Sport: Hockey
- Duration: Regular season 2006-09 – 2007-02; Playoffs; 2007-02 – 2007-04
- Teams: 7
- Finals champions: Bradford Rattlers

GMHL seasons
- 2007–08

The 2006–07 GMHL season was the first season of the Greater Metro Junior A Hockey League (GMHL). The seven teams of the GMHL played 42-game schedules.

In February 2007, the top teams of the league played down for the Russell Cup, emblematic of the grand championship of the GMHL. Since the GMHL is independent from Hockey Canada and the Canadian Junior Hockey League, the GMHL formed an alliance with the WHA Junior Hockey League of British Columbia under the name National Junior Hockey Alliance. At the end of the league playoffs, the WHA champion was invited to a 3-game series hosted by the GMHL champion. The Bradford Rattlers won the Russell Cup 4-games-to-1 over the King Wild and the Alliance Cup 3-games-to-none over the New Westminster Whalers.

== Changes ==
- GMHL is formed.
- Founding teams are: Bradford Rattlers, Deseronto Thunder, King Wild, Nipissing Alouettes, Richmond Hill Rams, South Muskoka Shield, and Toronto Canada Moose.
- National Junior Hockey Alliance is formed for one season with WHA Junior Hockey League.

== Final standings ==
Note: GP = Games played; W = Wins; L = Losses; OTL = Overtime Losses; SL = Shootout Losses; GF = Goals For.

Team	Centre	W–L–T-OTL	GF	GA	Points
Bradford Rattlers	Bradford	37-1-0-4	266	121	78
King Wild	King City	26-13-0-3	190	152	55
Richmond Hill Rams	Richmond Hill	25-15-0-2	230	187	52
Deseronto Thunder	Deseronto	19-18-0-5	173	163	43
Toronto Canada Moose	Thornhill	19-20-0-3	189	204	41
Nipissing Alouettes	Sturgeon Falls	17-20-0-5	143	169	39
South Muskoka Shield	Gravenhurst	4-34-0-4	110	299	12

Teams listed on the official league website.

Standings listed on official league website.

== 2006-07 Russell Cup Playoffs ==
Quarter-finals
1	Bradford	Bye
4	Deseronto	4
7	S. Muskoka	0
2	King	4
5	Toronto	1
3	Richmond Hill	4
6	Nipissing	2

Semi-finals
1	Bradford	4
4	Deseronto	2
2	King	4
3	Richmond Hill	2

Finals
1	Bradford	4
2	King	1

Playoff results are listed on the official league website.

== Alliance Cup ==
The National Junior Hockey Alliance championship between the WHA Junior Hockey League champion New Westminster Whalers and the GMHL champion Bradford Rattlers was hosted by the Rattlers in Bradford, Ontario. Although a best-of-3 series, the third game was played as a friendly, although Bradford won the first two games.

- Game 1: 03/30/07 - New Westminster 1 @ Bradford 6
- Game 2: 03/31/07 - New Westminster 6 @ Bradford 8
- Game 3: 04/01/07 - New Westminster 5 @ Bradford 6 (SO)

== Scoring leaders ==
Note: GP = Games played; G = Goals; A = Assists; Pts = Points; PIM = Penalty Minutes

Player / Team / GP / G / A / Pts / PIM; Craig Peacock / Richmond Hill Rams / - / 48 / 34 / 82 / -

== Leading goaltenders ==
Note: GP = Games played; Mins = Minutes Played; W = Wins; L = Losses: OTL = Overtime Losses; SL = Shootout Losses; GA = Goals Allowed; SO = Shutouts; GAA = Goals Against Average

Player / Team / GP / Mins / W / L / GA / SO / Sv% / GAA; Andreas Goetz / Bradford Rattlers / - / - / - / - / - / - / 0.939 / 2.05

== Awards ==
- Most Valuable Player - Karl Linden (Bradford Rattlers)
- Top Scorer - Craig Peacock (Richmond Hill Rams)
- Top Defenceman - Karl Linden (Bradford Rattlers)
- Top Goaltender - Andreas Goetz (Bradford Rattlers)
- Top Forward - Jordan Gidaro (King Wild)
- Most Heart - Ryan Henely (Nipissing Alouettes)
- Most Sportsmanlike Player - Brad Clark (Deseronto Thunder)
- Top Defensive Forward - Jake Gilbert (Nipissing Alouettes)
- Coach of the Year - Jenya Feldman (Bradford Rattlers)
- Official of the Year - John Klein

== See also ==
- 2006 in ice hockey
- 2007 in ice hockey

Preceded by --	GMHL seasons	Succeeded by 2007–08 GMHL season
