= Parry Sound Islanders =

- City: Parry Sound, Ontario, Canada
- League: Greater Metro Junior A Hockey League
- Founded: 2008; 18 years ago
- Folded: 2017; 9 years ago
- Home arena: Bobby Orr Community Centre
- Colours: Black, orange, and teal
- Owner(s): Jack Sports Group (Andy Palfrey; Mike Kolarik)
- General manager: Ken Thomas (2016–17)
- Head coach: Doug Raymond (2016–17)
- Media: MCTV

Franchise history
- 2008–2009: Ville-Marie Dragons
- 2009–2011: Powassan Dragons
- 2011–2014: Powassan Eagles
- 2014–2017: Parry Sound Islanders

The Parry Sound Islanders were a Junior ice hockey team based out of Parry Sound, Ontario, Canada. They played in the Greater Metro Junior A Hockey League.

== History ==
Powassan Eagles logo used from 2011 to 2014

In 2007, Ville-Marie first attempted to form a team in one of the established Ontario junior hockey leagues, making offers to both the Greater Metro Junior A Hockey League and the Northern Ontario Junior Hockey League. The GMHL turned down the offer due to their acceptance of a Temiscaming franchise that would have been compromised due to proximity. The NOJHL looked like they were going to accept the organization but the deal fell through in late summer. The NOJHL claimed that the Ville-Marie franchise would probably join in 2008.

In summer 2008, the NOJHL made no mention of interest in a Ville-Marie franchise but courted the already established Temiscaming Royals of the GMHL. Temiscaming accepted the offer to join the NOJHL and Ville-Marie reapplied for GMHL membership. On June 23, 2008, the GMHL officially announced the expansion of the Ville-Marie Dragons for the 2008–09 season.

Ville-Marie played their first ever game on September 12, 2008, at home against the Nipissing Alouettes. The Alouettes, who were entering their third season in the GMHL, dominated the expansion club 17–4. On October 16, 2008, the Dragons won their first game, defeating the Oro-Medonte 77's by a score of 4–3 at home.

On January 16, 2009, the Oro-Medonte 77's posted on their website that the upcoming game between the 77's and the Dragons had been cancelled as the Dragons had folded for the season. This marks the first time that a GMHL team has folded mid-season.

On April 8, 2009, it was announced that the team had been moved to Powassan, Ontario, and became the Powassan Dragons. On September 11, 2009, the Dragons played their first game in Powassan, a 6–3 victory over the Minden Riverkings. In December 2009, Dragons goalie Martijn Oosterwijk played as the starting goaltender for the Netherlands in the 2010 World Junior Ice Hockey Championships – Division II. He finished with a 4–1 record, leading his team to second place in their tournament and just missing promotion to Division I.

In May 2011, the team was sold and renamed the Powassan Eagles prior to the 2011–12 season. The new Czech-based ownership was planning on bringing up to 25 players from Europe to make up the team. However, the organization ran into work visa issues with several players and were unable to file a complete team at the start of the season. The organization went on hiatus for the 2011–12 season. The team returned to the GMHL in 2012.

In 2014, the Ontario Hockey League's North Bay Battalion elected to place a farm team in Powassan, called the Powassan Voodoos, as part of the NOJHL. The ownership of the Eagles chose to relocate and became the Parry Sound Islanders.

Prior to the start of the 2017–18 season, the owners announced that they would be merging the Islanders with one of their other teams, the Seguin Huskies, and playing out of the Seguin facilities. The ownership would also make Islanders' head coach Doug Raymond the new head coach of the Huskies.

== Season-by-season records ==
Season	GP	W	L	T	OTL	GF	GA	Pts	Regular season finish	Playoffs
Ville-Marie Dragons
2008–09	26	2	24	—	0	71	286	4	Folded midseason	
Powassan Dragons
2009–10	42	8	32	—	2	139	271	18	11th GMHL	Lost qualifier
2010–11	42	15	24	—	3	195	274	33	10th GMHL	Lost quarter-finals
Powassan Eagles
2011–12	Did not participate									
2012–13	42	25	13	2	2	194	171	54	5th GMHL	Lost Division Semi-finals
2013–14	42	14	27	—	1	155	253	29	15th GMHL	Lost Division Quarter-finals
Parry Sound Islanders
2014–15	42	16	24	—	2	175	258	34	3rd of 10, North Div. 14th of 22, GMHL	Lost div. semi-finals
2015–16	42	32	9	0	1	288	147	65	4th of 10, North Div. 8th of 30, GMHL	Lost div. semi-finals
2016–17	42	34	7	0	1	273	114	69	2nd of 10, North Div. 3rd of 21, GMHL	Lost League Finals

=== Playoffs ===
- 2010

Algoma Avalanche defeated Powassan Dragons 6–2 in the Last Minute Qualifier

- 2011

Powassan Dragons defeated Sturgeon Falls Lumberjacks 2-games-to-1 in qualifier round
Elliot Lake Bobcats defeated Powassan Dragons 3-games-to-none in quarter-finals

- 2013

Powassan Eagles defeated Rama Aces 3-games-to-none in division quarter-finals
Temiscaming Titans defeated Powassan Eagles 3-games-to-none in division semi-finals

- 2014

Temiscaming Titans defeated Powassan Eagles 3-games-to-none in division quarter-finals

- 2015

Seguin Huskies defeated Parry Sound Islanders 3-games-to-none in division quarter-finals

- 2016

Parry Sound Islanders defeated Seguin Huskies 3-games-to-none in division quarter-finals
South Muskoka Shield defeated Powassan Eagles 3-games-to-2 in division semi-finals

- 2017

Parry Sound Islanders defeated Bradford Bulls 3-games-to-none in division quarter-finals
Parry Sound Islanders defeated South Muskoka Shield 3-games-to-1 in division semi-finals
Parry Sound Islanders defeated New Tecumseth Civics 4-games-to-3 in division finals
Niagara Whalers defeated Parry Sound Islanders 4-games-to-0 in league finals

== Head coaches ==
	Nat	From	To	Regular Season					Playoffs		
	Nat	From	To	G	W	L	OTL	T	G	W	L
Gary Astalos	(United States)	2012	2013	42	25	13	2	2	6	3	3
Brandon Contratto	(United States)	2013	2015	84	30	51	3	-	6	0	6
Ken Thomas	(Canada)	2015	2016	42	32	9	1	0	8	5	3
Doug Raymond	(United States)	2016		42	34	7	1	-	18	10	8
