= 2012–13 NOJHL season =

35th season of the NOJHL

- League: Northern Ontario Junior Hockey League
- Sport: Hockey
- Duration: Regular season 2012-09-05 – 2013-03-13; Playoffs; 2013-03-15 – 2013-04-24
- Teams: 7
- Finals champions: North Bay Trappers

NOJHL seasons
- 2011–12 2013–14

The 2012–13 NOJHL season was the 35th season of the Northern Ontario Junior Hockey League (NOJHL). The seven teams of the NOJHL played 48-game schedules.

Come February, the top teams of each division will play down for the Copeland-McNamara Trophy, the NOJHL championship. The winner of the Copeland-McNamara Trophy will compete in the Central Canadian Junior "A" championship, the Dudley Hewitt Cup. If successful against the winners of the Ontario Junior Hockey League and Superior International Junior Hockey League, the champion would then move on to play in the Canadian Junior Hockey League championship, the 2013 Royal Bank Cup.

== Changes ==
- Soo Eagles leave league for North American Hockey League.
- Elliot Lake Bobcats join league from Greater Metro Junior A Hockey League.
- Sudbury Cubs change ownership, renamed Sudbury Nickel Barons.

== Current Standings ==
Note: GP = Games played; W = Wins; L = Losses; OTL = Overtime losses; SL = Shootout losses; GF = Goals for; GA = Goals against; PTS = Points; x = clinched playoff berth; y = clinched division title; z = clinched conference title

Team	Centre	W–L–T-OTL	GF–GA	Points
North Bay Trappers	North Bay, Ontario	34-7-3-4	215-120	75
Soo Thunderbirds	Sault Ste. Marie, Ontario	33-9-3-3	223-123	72
Sudbury Nickel Barons	Sudbury, Ontario	29-18-0-1	186-177	59
Kirkland Lake Gold Miners	Kirkland Lake, Ontario	25-18-2-3	173-145	55
Blind River Beavers	Blind River, Ontario	13-27-2-6	178-226	34
Elliot Lake Bobcats	Elliot Lake, Ontario	15-31-0-2	147-238	32
Abitibi Eskimos	Iroquois Falls, Ontario	14-31-0-3	165-258	31

Teams listed on the official league website.

Standings listed on official league website.

== 2012-13 Copeland-McNamara Trophy Playoffs ==
Quarter-finals
4	Kirkland Lake	4
5	Blind River	0
2	Soo	4
7	Abitibi	0
3	Sudbury	4
6	Elliot Lake	3

Semi-finals
1	North Bay	4
4	Kirkland Lake	1
2	Soo	4
3	Sudbury	0

McNamara Trophy Finals
1	North Bay	4
2	Soo	3

Playoff results are listed on the official league website.

== Dudley Hewitt Cup Championship ==
Hosted by the North Bay Trappers in North Bay, Ontario. North Bay finished 4th, while the Soo Thunderbirds finished 3rd.

Round Robin

St. Michael's Buzzers (OJHL) 4 - Soo Thunderbirds 2
North Bay Trappers 4 - Minnesota Wilderness (SIJHL) 1
Minnesota Wilderness (SIJHL) 7 - Soo Thunderbirds 0
St. Michael's Buzzers (OJHL) 5 - North Bay Trappers 2
Soo Thunderbirds 4 - North Bay Trappers 3 OT

Semi-final

St. Michael's Buzzers (OJHL) 5 - Soo Thunderbirds 1

== Scoring leaders ==
Note: GP = Games played; G = Goals; A = Assists; Pts = Points; PIM = Penalty minutes

Player	Team	GP	G	A	Pts	PIM
Sebastien Leroux	Sudbury	44	29	53	82	58
Darcy Haines	Sudbury	46	39	42	81	30
Darcy Casola	Soo	48	28	38	66	19
Adam Ritchie	Soo	38	28	33	61	22
Richard Therrien	Abitibi	27	29	27	56	10
Samuel Wilbur	Blind River	48	21	34	55	53
Brennen Dubchak	North Bay	47	21	30	51	25
Corey McEwen	Blind River	46	20	28	48	28
Trevor Hunt	North Bay	43	22	26	48	56
Anthony Miller	Soo	45	21	26	47	23

== Leading goaltenders ==
Note: 1000 Minutes minimum; GP = Games played; Mins = Minutes played; W = Wins; L = Losses: OTL = Overtime losses; SL = Shootout losses; GA = Goals Allowed; SO = Shutouts; GAA = Goals against average

Player	Team	GP	Mins	GA	W	L	T	SO	Svs	Sv%	GAA
Greg Dodds	North Bay	39	2235.38	84	28	6	3	3	1089	0.928	2.25
Joel Horodziejczk	Soo	32	1915.07	76	19	10	2	2	855	0.918	2.38
Steve Dombrowski	Soo	17	1000.32	42	13	2	1	3	449	0.914	2.52
Chris Komma	Kirkland Lake	41	2301.43	100	21	17	1	3	930	0.903	2.61
Alexander Laino	Sudbury	30	1625.34	100	17	10	0	1	925	0.902	3.69

== Awards ==
- Top Defenceman (NOJHL Award) - Adam Newkirk (Blind River)
- Most Improved (Gilles Laperriere Trophy) - Trevor Hunt (North Bay)
- Top Defensive Forward (Mitch Tetreault Memorial Trophy) - Brandon Bazinet (Blind River)
- Team Goaltending (NOJHL Award) - Greg Dodds/Dustin Hummel (North Bay)
- Top GAA (Wayne Chase Memorial Award) - Greg Dodds (North Bay)
- Top Scorer (Jimmy Conners Memorial Trophy) - Sebastien Leroux (Sudbury)
- Most Valuable Player (Carlo Catterello Trophy) - Darcy Haines (Sudbury)
- Top Rookie (John Grignon Trophy) - Joel Horodziejczyk (Soo)
- Most Gentlemanly Player (Onaping Falls Huskies Trophy) - Brandon Janke (North Bay)
- Top Team Player (NOJHL Trophy) - Darcy Casola (Soo)
- Scholastic Award (NOJHL Trophy) - Tait Seguin (North Bay)
- CJHL Scholastic Nominee Award - Tait Seguin (North Bay)
- Playoff's Most Valuable Player (NOJHL Trophy) - Trevor Hunt (North Bay)
- Coach of the Year (Mirl "Red" McCarthy Memorial Award) - Marc Lafleur (Kirkland Lake)
- Top Executive (Joe Drago Trophy) - Rusty Joncas (Blind River)

== See also ==
- 2013 Royal Bank Cup
- Dudley Hewitt Cup
- List of NOHA Junior A seasons
- Ontario Junior Hockey League
- Superior International Junior Hockey League
- Greater Ontario Junior Hockey League
- 2012 in ice hockey
- 2013 in ice hockey

Preceded by 2011–12 NOJHL season	NOJHL seasons	Succeeded by 2013–14 NOJHL season
