= Minden Riverkings =

- City: Minden Hills, Ontario, Canada
- League: Greater Metro Junior A Hockey League
- Operated: 2008-2009
- Home arena: S.G. Nesbitt Memorial Arena
- Colours: Blue, Yellow, and White
- General manager: Dan Garneau
- Head coach: Brooks Robinson

The Minden Riverkings were a Junior ice hockey team based in of Minden, Ontario, Canada. They played in the Greater Metro Junior 'A' Hockey League.

== History ==
In April 2008, it was announced that Minden had been chosen as a 2008-09 season expansion team within the Greater Metro Junior A Hockey League. This marks the first time the region has received a team since nearby Haliburton had one in the 1970s.

Minden played their first ever game on September 13, 2008 against the South Muskoka Shield in Gravenhurst. Despite the Riverkings leading most of the game, the Shield crept back in late to tie the game and won it in a five-man shootout 1-0 to win the game 6-5.

On September 20, 2008, the Riverkings recorded their first ever victory by defeating the Ville-Marie Dragons 6-3 at a showcase weekend in Thornhill, Ontario.

On November 11, 2009, the GMHL announced that the Minden Riverkings had ceased operations.

== Season-by-Season Standings ==
Season	GP	W	L	T	OTL	GF	GA	P	Results
2008-09	43	18	24	-	1	172	219	37	10th GMJHL
2009-10	15	2	13	-	0	56	87	4	12th GMJHL (Folded)
2 Seasons	58	20	37	-	1	228	306	--	0.353

=== Playoffs ===
- 2009 Lost division quarter-final

Elliot Lake Bobcats defeated Minden Riverkings 3-games-to-none in division quarter-final
