= 2013–14 NOJHL season =

- League: Northern Ontario Junior Hockey League
- Sport: Hockey
- Duration: Regular season 2013-09-04 – 2014-03-09; Playoffs; 2014-03-14 – 2014-04-22
- Teams: 8
- Finals champions: Kirkland Lake Gold Miners

NOJHL seasons
- 2012–13 2014–15

The 2013–14 NOJHL season was the 36th season of the Northern Ontario Junior Hockey League (NOJHL). The seven teams of the NOJHL played 56-game schedules.

Come February, the top teams of each division will play down for the Copeland-McNamara Trophy, the NOJHL championship. The winner of the Copeland-McNamara Trophy will compete in the Central Canadian Junior "A" championship, the Dudley Hewitt Cup. If successful against the winners of the Ontario Junior Hockey League and Superior International Junior Hockey League, the champion would then move on to play in the Canadian Junior Hockey League championship, the 2014 Royal Bank Cup.

== Changes ==
- Espanola Rivermen join league.

== Current Standings ==
Note: GP = Games played; W = Wins; L = Losses; OTL = Overtime losses; SL = Shootout losses; GF = Goals for; GA = Goals against; PTS = Points; x = clinched playoff berth; y = clinched division title; z = clinched conference title

| Team | Centre | W–L–T-OTL | GF–GA | Points |
|---|---|---|---|---|
| Soo Thunderbirds | Sault Ste. Marie, Ontario | 48-5-1-2 | 245-102 | 99 |
| Kirkland Lake Gold Miners | Kirkland Lake, Ontario | 43-7-1-5 | 234-118 | 92 |
| Espanola Rivermen | Espanola, Ontario | 32-23-0-1 | 218-187 | 65 |
| Abitibi Eskimos | Iroquois Falls, Ontario | 30-22-0-4 | 212-212 | 64 |
| Elliot Lake Bobcats | Elliot Lake, Ontario | 26-24-0-6 | 200-203 | 58 |
| Sudbury Nickel Barons | Sudbury, Ontario | 19-30-0-7 | 170-219 | 46 |
| North Bay Trappers | North Bay, Ontario | 15-35-0-6 | 154-238 | 36 |
| Blind River Beavers | Blind River, Ontario | 10-42-0-4 | 127-281 | 24 |

Teams listed on the official league website.

Standings listed on official league website.

== 2014 Copeland-McNamara Trophy Playoffs ==
Quarter-finals
1 | Soo | 4
8 | Blind River | 1
4 | Abitibi | 4
5 | Elliot Lake | 3
2 | Kirkland Lake | 4
7 | North Bay | 0
3 | Espanola | 4
6 | Sudbury | 0

Semi-finals
1 | Soo | 4
4 | Abitibi | 0
2 | Kirkland Lake | 4
3 | Espanola | 0

McNamara Trophy Finals
1 | Soo | 2
2 | Kirkland Lake | 4

Playoff results are listed on the official league website.

== Dudley Hewitt Cup Championship ==
Hosted by the Wellington Dukes in Wellington, Ontario. The Kirkland Lake Gold Miners represented the NOJHL and finished fourth in the round robin.

Round Robin

Wellington Dukes (OJHL) 4 - Kirkland Lake Gold Miners 1
Toronto Lakeshore Patriots (OJHL) 4 - Kirkland Lake Gold Miners 1
Fort Frances Lakers (SIJHL) 6 - Kirkland Lake Gold Miners 3

== Scoring leaders ==
Note: GP = Games played; G = Goals; A = Assists; Pts = Points; PIM = Penalty minutes

| Player | Team | GP | G | A | Pts | PIM |
|---|---|---|---|---|---|---|
| Gavin Burbach | Soo | 56 | 48 | 39 | 87 | 48 |
| Brennan Dubchak | Espanola | 55 | 35 | 48 | 83 | 37 |
| Samuel Wilbur | Kirkland Lake | 56 | 34 | 49 | 83 | 38 |
| Steven Babin | Kirkland Lake | 56 | 24 | 55 | 79 | 20 |
| Brett Wagner | Elliot Lake | 56 | 41 | 33 | 74 | 4 |
| Brandon Janke | Espanola | 57 | 27 | 47 | 74 | 37 |
| Corbin Bean | Espanola | 56 | 30 | 43 | 73 | 27 |
| Anthony Miller | Soo | 56 | 29 | 37 | 66 | 29 |
| Austin Rust | Kirkland Lake | 56 | 35 | 30 | 65 | 40 |
| Darcy Haines | Soo | 33 | 21 | 44 | 65 | 41 |

== Leading goaltenders ==
Note: 1000 Minutes minimum; GP = Games played; Mins = Minutes played; W = Wins; L = Losses: OTL = Overtime losses; SL = Shootout losses; GA = Goals Allowed; SO = Shutouts; GAA = Goals against average

| Player | Team | GP | Mins | GA | W | L | T | SO | Svs | Sv% | GAA |
|---|---|---|---|---|---|---|---|---|---|---|---|
| Joel Horodziejczyk | Soo | 33 | 1992:18 | 57 | 29 | 2 | 1 | 4 | 817 | 0.935 | 1.72 |
| Jeremy Pominville | Kirkland Lake | 18 | 1059:05 | 36 | 11 | 6 | 1 | 4 | 439 | 0.924 | 2.04 |
| Kenny Fitzgerald | Kirkland Lake | 29 | 1716:00 | 59 | 22 | 5 | 0 | 0 | 660 | 0.918 | 2.06 |
| Brian Kment | Soo | 24 | 1401:33 | 45 | 19 | 5 | 0 | 2 | 467 | 0.912 | 1.93 |
| Evan Cormier | North Bay | 37 | 1975:18 | 124 | 8 | 27 | 0 | 0 | 1221 | 0.908 | 3.77 |

== Awards ==
- Top Defenceman (NOJHL Award) -
- Most Improved (Gilles Laperriere Trophy) -
- Top Defensive Forward (Mitch Tetreault Memorial Trophy) -
- Team Goaltending (NOJHL Award) -
- Top GAA (Wayne Chase Memorial Award) -
- Top Scorer (Jimmy Conners Memorial Trophy) -
- Most Valuable Player (Carlo Catterello Trophy) -
- Top Rookie (John Grignon Trophy) -
- Most Gentlemanly Player (Onaping Falls Huskies Trophy) -
- Top Team Player (NOJHL Trophy) -
- Scholastic Award (NOJHL Trophy) -
- CJHL Scholastic Nominee Award -
- Playoff's Most Valuable Player (NOJHL Trophy) -
- Coach of the Year (Mirl "Red" McCarthy Memorial Award) -
- Top Executive (Joe Drago Trophy) -

== See also ==
- 2014 Royal Bank Cup
- Dudley Hewitt Cup
- List of NOHA Junior A seasons
- Ontario Junior Hockey League
- Superior International Junior Hockey League
- Greater Ontario Junior Hockey League
- 2013 in ice hockey
- 2014 in ice hockey

| Preceded by 2012–13 NOJHL season | NOJHL seasons | Succeeded by 2014–15 NOJHL season |
