= 2010–11 NOJHL season =

- League: Northern Ontario Junior Hockey League
- Sport: Hockey
- Duration: Regular season 2010-09-08 – 2011-03-02; Playoffs; 2011-03-04 – 2011-04-11
- Teams: 8
- Finals champions: Soo Eagles

NOJHL seasons
- 2009–10 2011–12

The 2010–11 NOJHL season is the 33rd season of the Northern Ontario Junior Hockey League (NOJHL). The eight teams of the East and West Divisions will play 50-game schedules.

Come February, the top teams of each division will play down for the Copeland-McNamara Trophy, the NOJHL championship. The winner of the Copeland-McNamara Trophy will compete in the Central Canadian Junior "A" championship, the Dudley Hewitt Cup. If successful against the winners of the Ontario Junior Hockey League and Superior International Junior Hockey League, the champion would then move on to play in the Canadian Junior Hockey League championship, the 2011 Royal Bank Cup.

== Changes ==
- No major changes.

== Current Standings ==
Note: GP = Games played; W = Wins; L = Losses; OTL = Overtime losses; SL = Shootout losses; GF = Goals for; GA = Goals against; PTS = Points; x = clinched playoff berth; y = clinched division title; z = clinched conference title

Eastern Division
Team	Centre	W–L–OTL	Points
Sudbury Jr. Wolves	Sudbury, Ontario	30-14-6	66
Abitibi Eskimos	Iroquois Falls, Ontario	26-23-1	53
North Bay Trappers	North Bay, Ontario	22-23-5	49
Temiscaming Royals	Temiscaming, Quebec	18-29-3	39
Western Division
Team	Centre	W–L–OTL	Points
Soo Thunderbirds	Sault Ste. Marie, Ontario	38-9-3	79
Soo Eagles	Sault Ste. Marie, Michigan	37-10-3	77
Blind River Beavers	Blind River, Ontario	25-21-4	54
Manitoulin Islanders	Little Current, Ontario	4-46-0	8

Standings listed on official league website.

== 2010-11 Copeland-McNamara Trophy Playoffs ==
Quarter-finals
E1	Sudbury	4
E4	Temiscaming	0
East
E2	Abitibi	4
E3	North Bay	2
W1	Soo Thunderbirds	4
W4	Manitoulin	0
West
W2	Soo Eagles	4
W3	Blind River	1

Semi-finals
E1	Sudbury	4
E2	Abitibi	1
W1	Soo Thunderbirds	3
W2	Soo Eagles	4

McNamara Trophy Finals
E1	Sudbury	2
W2	Soo Eagles	4

Playoff results are listed on the official league website.

== Dudley Hewitt Cup Championship ==
Hosted by the Huntsville Otters in Huntsville, Ontario. The Soo Eagles finished in third place.

Round Robin

Huntsville Otters (OJHL) 6 - Soo Eagles 4
Wellington Dukes (OJHL) 7 - Soo Eagles 1
Soo Eagles 2 - Wisconsin Wilderness (SIJHL) 1 in quadruple overtime

Semi-final

Wellington Dukes (OJHL) 3 - Soo Eagles 2 in quadruple overtime

== Scoring leaders ==
Note: GP = Games played; G = Goals; A = Assists; Pts = Points; PIM = Penalty minutes

Player	Team	GP	G	A	Pts	PIM
Andre Leclair	Temiscaming Royals	46	40	55	95	77
Evan Daciuk	Sudbury Jr. Wolves	47	28	47	75	59
Erik Robichaud	Abitibi Eskimos	50	31	42	73	28
Jerry Petingalo	Soo Thunderbirds	50	29	44	73	20
Brian Depp	Soo Eagles	50	28	45	73	43
Robin Mendelsohn	Temiscaming Royals	48	21	51	72	16
Brock Raffaele	Soo Eagles	50	27	44	71	18
Travis Payne	Soo Eagles	50	25	46	71	40
Robbie Payne	Soo Eagles	49	39	29	68	61
Aaron Leonard	Soo Eagles	50	28	39	67	28

== Leading goaltenders ==
Note: GP = Games played; Mins = Minutes played; W = Wins; L = Losses: OTL = Overtime losses; SL = Shootout losses; GA = Goals Allowed; SO = Shutouts; GAA = Goals against average

Player	Team	GP	Mins	W	L	T	GA	SO	Sv%	GAA
Jake Paterson	Soo Eagles	13	793:12	10	1	2	39	2	.921	2.95
John Kleinhans	Soo Eagles	25	1413:54	19	4	0	74	1	.917	3.14
Michael Doan	Soo Thunderbirds	37	2122:53	25	8	8	94	3	.916	2.66
Landon Noel	North Bay Trappers	15	799:20	6	5	2	39	1	.908	2.93
Aaron Beutenmiller	Soo Eagles	15	792:42	8	5	1	42	1	.908	3.18

== Award winners ==
- Player of the Year: Brett Campbell (Blind River Beavers)
- Best Defenceman: Joel Gagnon (Sudbury Jr. Wolves)
- Most Improved Player: Darnell Koosees (North Bay Trappers)
- Mitch Tetreault Memorial Trophy (Top Defensive Forward): Jake Wright (Soo Thunderbirds)
- NOJHL Award (Top Goaltender): Michael Doan, Remo Febbraro (Soo Thunderbirds)
- Wayne Chase Memorial Award (Best GAA): Michael Doan (Soo Thunderbirds)
- Jimmy Conners Memorial Trophy (Scoring Champion): Andre Leclair (Temiscaming Royals)
- Carlo Cattarello Trophy (Most Valuable Player): Jerry Petingalo (Soo Thunderbirds)
- John Grignon Trophy (Top Rookie): Erik Robichaud (Abitibi Eskimos)
- Onaping Falls Huskies Trophy (Most Gentlemanly): Joshua Clancy (Abitibi Eskimos)
- Best Team Player: Brett Campbell (Blind River Beavers)
- Scholastic Player of the Year: Geoff Gieni (Soo Thunderbirds)
- Playoffs Most Valuable Player: Jake Paterson (Soo Eagles)
- Mirl "Red" McCarthy Memorial Trophy (Top Coach): Bruno Bragagnolo (Soo Eagles)
- Joe Drago Trophy (Top Executive): Chris Dawson (North Bay Trappers)

== See also ==
- 2011 Royal Bank Cup
- Dudley Hewitt Cup
- List of NOHA Junior A seasons
- Ontario Junior Hockey League
- Superior International Junior Hockey League
- Greater Ontario Junior Hockey League

Preceded by 2009–10 NOJHL season	NOJHL seasons	Succeeded by 2011–12 NOJHL season
