= Espanola Kings =

- City: Espanola, Ontario, Canada
- League: Greater Metro Junior A Hockey League
- Operated: 2007-2009
- Home arena: Espanola Regional Recreation Complex Arena
- Colours: Black, Yellow, and White
- General manager: Dave Blyth
- Head coach: Rory Wardell

The Espanola Kings were a junior ice hockey team based in Espanola, Ontario, Canada. They played in the Greater Metro Junior 'A' Hockey League.

== History ==
On February 18, 2007, Bob Russell announced the expansion of the Espanola Kings for the 2007-08 season . The announcement corresponded with two games that took place in Espanola between the King Wild and the Richmond Hill Rams franchises. The Kings are owned by the same ownership group as the Rams and were named after the 1970s Oak Ridges Kings of the Metro Junior B Hockey League.

The expansion of the Kings makes them the eighth team in the independent GMJHL and one of six 2007 expansion teams.

On September 7, 2007, the Espanola Kings played their first ever game in Elliot Lake against the Elliot Lake Bobcats. The Bobcats defeated the Kings 3-2. On September 14, the Kings played their first ever home game, against the South Muskoka Shield. This resulted in a 6-4 victory — the Kings' first ever win.

After the 2009 GMHL Spring General Managers' meeting, it was announced that the Kings would not take part in the 2009-10 season. The Kings did not return, and nor did their sister franchise, Richmond Hill Rams.

== Season-by-season standings ==
Season	GP	W	L	T	OTL	GF	GA	P	Results
2007-08	42	15	26	-	1	151	226	31	9th GMJHL
2008-09	43	8	34	-	1	110	334	17	13th GMJHL
2 Seasons	85	23	60	-	2	261	560	--	0.282

=== Playoffs ===
- 2008 Lost bye round

Temiscaming Royals defeated Espanola Kings 4-games-to-none in bye round

- 2009 Did not qualify
