= 2012 Royal Bank Cup =

National Junior A Championship

Tournament details
- Venue: Elgar Peterson Arena in Humboldt, Saskatchewan
- Dates: May 5, 2012 – May 13, 2012
- Teams: 5

Final positions
- Champions: Penticton Vees (2nd title)
- Runners-up: Woodstock Slammers

Tournament statistics
- Games played: 13

Awards
- MVP: John Kleinhans (Soo)

The 2012 Royal Bank Cup was the 42nd Junior "A" 2012 ice hockey National Championship for the Canadian Junior Hockey League. The 2012 Royal Bank Cup marked the 42nd consecutive year a national championship had been awarded to this skill level since the breakaway of Major Junior hockey in 1970.

The Royal Bank Cup was competed for by the winners of the Doyle Cup, Anavet Cup, Dudley Hewitt Cup, the Fred Page Cup and the host team, the Humboldt Broncos of the Saskatchewan Junior Hockey League.

The tournament's round robin stage began on May 5, 2012, and the final was played on May 13, 2012. Tournament games were played at the Elgar Peterson Arena in Humboldt, Saskatchewan. Like every other year of the RBC round robin, it consisted of 5 teams in 2012.

== Format ==
Since the Humboldt Broncos were the 2012 SJHL regular season champions and playoff champions, the Broncos still moved on to compete for the 2012 Anavet Cup. The Broncos turned out to be successful in the best of 7 2012 Anavet Cup series, defeating the 2012 MJHL playoff champion the Portage Terriers 4–3. Since the Humboldt Broncos hosted the 2012 RBC, the Portage Terriers received a berth in the tournament because every year during the RBC tournament the host teams automatically play, even if they missed or lost out of the playoffs early.

The Penticton Vees of the BCHL entered the tournament as BCHL and Doyle Cup champions, with a BCHL record 42-game winning streak under their belt from earlier in the year. While breaking the BCHL record, the Vees rivaled but did not surpass the nationwide Junior A records of the 1999-2000 Rayside-Balfour Sabrecats (49 games, NOJHL), 1989-90 Sudbury Cubs (48 games, NOJHL), or 1981-82 Flin Flon Bombers (46 games, NJHL).

== Final ==
The Penticton Vees won their second-ever National Junior A Championship with a 4–3 come-from-behind victory over the Maritime Junior Hockey League's Woodstock Slammers. The Vees led 2–0, but the Slammers stormed back to take a 3–2 lead past the halfway point of the third period. Soon after, the Vees scored to tie it in a game that seemed destined for overtime. In the final eight and a half minutes of play, the Slammers took three consecutive penalties, in which the Vees scored in the final minute of the final power play with 51 seconds remaining in the game to clinch the Royal Bank Cup. During the regular season, the Vees and Slammers were both nationally ranked #1 teams for most of the season, setting up a very evenly matched final.

== Teams ==
- Humboldt Broncos (Host)

Regular season: 42-11-2-3 (1st overall)
Playoffs: Defeated La Ronge 4-0, Defeated Battlefords 4-2, Defeated Weyburn 4-2 (SJHL Champions), Defeated Portage 4-3 (Won Anavet Cup).

- Portage Terriers (West)

Regular season: 42-15-0-5 (1st overall)
Playoffs: Defeated Selkirk 4-0, Defeated Winnipeg Blues 4-2, Defeated Winnipeg Saints 4-1 (MJHL Champions), Lost to Humboldt 3-4.

- Soo Thunderbirds (Central)

Regular season: 37-11-0-2 (1st overall)
Playoffs: Won round robin (3-0-1), Defeated Soo Eagles 4-0, Defeated North Bay 4-1 (NOJHL Champions), Won Dudley Hewitt Cup (4-1).

- Penticton Vees (Pacific)

Regular season: 54-4-0-2 (1st overall)
Playoffs: Defeated Chilliwack 4-2, Defeated Merritt 4-1, Defeated Powell River 4-0 (BCHL Champions), Defeated Brooks 4-1 (Won Doyle Cup).

- Woodstock Slammers (East)

Regular season: 45-6-0-1 (1st overall)
Playoffs: Defeated Campbellton 4-0, Defeated Summerside 4-0, Defeated Yarmouth 4-3 (MHL Champions), Won Fred Page Cup (4-0).

== Tournament ==
=== Round Robin ===
Pos	League (Ticket)	Team	Pld	W	L	GF	GA	GD	Qualification
1	SJHL (Host/Anavet Cup)	Humboldt Broncos	4	4	0	15	6	+9	Semi-final
2	NOJHL (Dudley Hewitt Cup)	Soo Thunderbirds	4	2	2	12	12	0	Semi-final
3	BCHL (Doyle Cup)	Penticton Vees	4	2	2	8	7	+1	Semi-final
4	MHL (Fred Page Cup)	Woodstock Slammers	4	1	3	10	14	−4	Semi-final
5	MJHL (Anavet Cup finalist)	Portage Terriers	4	1	3	9	15	−6	Eliminated

==== Results ====
All games at the Elgar Peterson Arena in Humboldt, SK.

Game	Home team	Score	Away team	Score	Notes
Saturday, May 5, 2012
1	Penticton Vees	1	Soo Thunderbirds	2	Final - Shots: 45-15 PEN
2	Woodstock Slammers	1	Humboldt Broncos	4	Final - Shots: 37-35 HUM
Sunday, May 6, 2012
3	Portage Terriers	4	Soo Thunderbirds	3	2OT Final - Shots: 72-44 POR
4	Humboldt Broncos	3	Penticton Vees	2	OT Final - Shots: 43-31 HUM
Monday, May 7, 2012
5	Portage Terriers	1	Woodstock Slammers	4	Final - Shots: 35-29 WST
Tuesday, May 8, 2012
6	Soo Thunderbirds	0	Humboldt Broncos	3	Final - Shots: 42-19 HUM
7	Woodstock Slammers	1	Penticton Vees	2	Final - Shots: 41-21 PEN
Wednesday, May 9, 2012
8	Penticton Vees	3	Portage Terriers	1	Final - Shots: 27-26 PEN
Thursday, May 10, 2012
9	Soo Thunderbirds	7	Woodstock Slammers	4	Final - Shots: 35-19 WST
10	Humboldt Broncos	5	Portage Terriers	3	Final - Shots: 35-30 POR

=== Semi-final ===
Game	Home team	Score	Away team	Score	Notes
Saturday, May 12, 2012
11	Humboldt Broncos	3	Woodstock Slammers	4	OT Final - Shots: 43-24 HUM
12	Soo Thunderbirds	0	Penticton Vees	3	Final - Shots: 33-20 PEN

=== Final ===
Game	Home team	Score	Away team	Score	Notes
Sunday, May 13, 2012
13	Penticton Vees	4	Woodstock Slammers	3	Final - Shots: 34-25 PEN

== Awards ==
Roland Mercier Trophy (Tournament MVP): John Kleinhans (Soo Thunderbirds)
Top Forward: Andrew Johnston (Humboldt Broncos)
Top Defencemen: Troy Stecher (Penticton Vees)
Top Goaltender: John Kleinhans (Soo Thunderbirds)
Tubby Smaltz Trophy (Sportsmanship): Micky Sartoretto (Soo Thunderbirds)

== Roll of League Champions ==
AJHL: Brooks Bandits
BCHL: Penticton Vees
CCHL: Nepean Raiders
MHL: Woodstock Slammers
MJHL: Portage Terriers
NOJHL: Soo Thunderbirds
OJHL: Stouffville Spirit
QJAAAHL: Princeville Titans
SJHL: Humboldt Broncos
SIJHL: Wisconsin Wilderness

== See also ==
- Canadian Junior A Hockey League
- Royal Bank Cup
- Anavet Cup
- Doyle Cup
- Dudley Hewitt Cup
- Fred Page Cup
