= 2007–08 NOJHL season =

- League: Northern Ontario Junior Hockey League
- Sport: Hockey
- Duration: Regular season 2007-09-05 – 2008-03-02; Playoffs; 2008-03-05 – 2008-04-12
- Teams: 6
- Finals champions: Sudbury Jr. Wolves

NOJHL seasons
- 2006–07 2008–09

The 2007–08 NOJHL season is the 30th season of the Northern Ontario Junior Hockey League (NOJHL). The six teams of the East and West Divisions will play 50-game schedules.

Come February, the top teams of each division will play down for the Copeland-McNamara Trophy, the NOJHL championship. The winner of the Copeland-McNamara Trophy will compete in the Central Canadian Junior "A" championship, the Dudley Hewitt Cup. If successful against the winners of the Ontario Junior Hockey League and Superior International Junior Hockey League, the champion would then move on to play in the Canadian Junior Hockey League championship, the 2008 Royal Bank Cup.

== Changes ==
- Soo Eagles take one year's leave.

== Final standings ==
Note: GP = Games played; W = Wins; L = Losses; OTL = Overtime losses; SL = Shootout losses; GF = Goals for; GA = Goals against; PTS = Points; x = clinched playoff berth; y = clinched division title; z = clinched conference title

Final Standings
Team	Centre	W-L-T-OTL	GF	GA	Points
Soo Thunderbirds	Sault Ste. Marie	33-9-0-8	206	145	101
Abitibi Eskimos	Iroquois Falls	31-14-0-5	224	157	94
North Bay Skyhawks	North Bay	31-14-0-5	191	152	91
Sudbury Jr. Wolves	Copper Cliff	28-17-0-5	216	176	84
Blind River Beavers	Blind River	25-20-0-5	189	194	74
Manitoulin Islanders	Little Current	2-47-0-1	109	311	6

Teams listed on the official league website.

Standings listed on official league website.

== 2007-08 Copeland-McNamara Trophy Playoffs ==
Quarter-finals
4	Sudbury	4
5	Blind River	2
3	North Bay	4
6	Manitoulin	1

Semi-finals
1	Soo	2
4	Sudbury	4
2	Abitibi	4
3	North Bay	2

McNamara Trophy Finals
4	Sudbury	4
2	Abitibi	0

Playoff results are listed on the official league website.

== Dudley Hewitt Cup Championship ==
Hosted by the Newmarket Hurricanes in Newmarket, Ontario. Sudbury finished in fourth.

Round Robin

Newmarket Hurricanes (OPJHL) 5 - Sudbury Wolves 1
Oakville Blades (OPJHL) 5 - Sudbury Wolves 3
Dryden Ice Dogs (SIJHL) 4 - Sudbury Wolves 0

== Scoring leaders ==
Note: GP = Games played; G = Goals; A = Assists; Pts = Points; PIM = Penalty minutes

Player	Team	GP	G	A	Pts	PIM
Scott Restoule	Sudbury Jr. Wolves	41	37	48	85	130
Russel Morin	Abitibi Eskimos	50	37	27	64	37
Nick Minardi	Soo Thunderbirds	50	31	29	60	75
Brenden Biedermann	Sudbury Jr. Wolves	48	29	31	60	64
Dustin Fummerton	North Bay Skyhawks	48	16	44	60	40
Chris Kangas	Sudbury Jr. Wolves	44	20	36	56	63
Chris Pontes	Sudbury Jr. Wolves	47	25	30	55	24
Matt Amadio	Soo Thunderbirds	50	22	33	55	25
Brandon Ingraham	Manitoulin Islanders	50	21	34	55	23
Jeremie Dorval	Abitibi Eskimos	49	30	24	54	21

== Leading goaltenders ==
Note: GP = Games played; Mins = Minutes played; W = Wins; L = Losses: OTL = Overtime losses; SL = Shootout losses; GA = Goals Allowed; SO = Shutouts; GAA = Goals against average

Player	Team	GP	Mins	W	L	T	GA	SO	Sv%	GAA
Miles Williams	Abitibi Eskimos	20	1045:42	14	2	1	40	2	0.927	2.30
Ryan Dube	Soo Thunderbirds	24	1388:26	13	5	6	56	1	0.916	2.42
Jake Rosenthal	Blind River Beavers	29	1623:41	15	11	1	91	1	0.911	3.36
Travis O'Brien	Soo Thunderbirds	29	1677:03	20	5	1	79	1	0.903	2.83
Andre Laperriere	North Bay Skyhawks	22	1160:33	15	4	1	48	1	0.899	2.48

== Awards ==
- Player of the Year - Mussel Morin (Abitibi Eskimos)
- Most Valuable Player - Jeremie Dorval (Abitibi Eskimos)
- Most Gentlemanly Player - Adam Pyymaki (Soo Thunderbirds)
- Rookie of the Year - Jarret Burton (Blind River Beavers)
- Top Defenceman - Ben Davey (Soo Thunderbirds)
- Most Improved Player - Dan Vernelli (Soo Thunderbirds)
- Top Defensive Forward - Kody Carnevale (North Bay Skyhawks)
- Top "Team Player" - Brandon Ingraham (Manitoulin Islanders)
- Director of the Year - Al Jones (Soo Thunderbirds)
- Coach of the Year - Paul Gagne (Abitibi Eskimos)
- Team Goaltending Award - Ryan Dube, Travis O'Brien (Soo Thunderbirds)
- Top Goals Against Average - Miles Williams (Abitibi Eskimos)
- Scoring Champion - Scott Restoule (Sudbury Jr. Wolves)
- Playoff Most Valuable Player - Joey Delwo (Sudbury Jr. Wolves)

== See also ==
- 2008 Royal Bank Cup
- Dudley Hewitt Cup
- List of NOHA Junior A seasons
- Ontario Junior Hockey League
- Superior International Junior Hockey League
- Greater Ontario Junior Hockey League

Preceded by 2006–07 NOJHL season	NOJHL seasons	Succeeded by 2008–09 NOJHL season
