= 2006–07 NOJHL season =

- League: Northern Ontario Junior Hockey League
- Sport: Hockey
- Duration: Regular season 2006-09-09 – 2007-03-11; Playoffs; 2007-03-13 – 2007-04-14
- Teams: 7
- Finals champions: Sudbury Jr. Wolves

NOJHL seasons
- 2005–06 2007–08

The 2006–07 NOJHL season is the 29th season of the Northern Ontario Junior Hockey League (NOJHL). The seven teams of the NOJHL will play 48-game schedules.

Come February, the top teams of each division will play down for the Copeland-McNamara Trophy, the NOJHL championship. The winner of the Copeland-McNamara Trophy will compete in the Central Canadian Junior "A" championship, the Dudley Hewitt Cup. If successful against the winners of the Ontario Junior Hockey League and Superior International Junior Hockey League, the champion would then move on to play in the Canadian Junior Hockey League championship, the 2007 Royal Bank Cup.

== Changes ==
- Northern Michigan Black Bears become the Soo Indians.

== Final standings ==
Note: GP = Games played; W = Wins; L = Losses; OTL = Overtime losses; SL = Shootout losses; GF = Goals for; GA = Goals against; PTS = Points; x = clinched playoff berth; y = clinched division title; z = clinched conference title

Final Standings
Team	Centre	W–L–T-OTL	GF	GA	Points
Soo Indians	Sault Ste. Marie, MI	31-15-0-2	193	145	64
Sudbury Jr. Wolves	Copper Cliff	29-13-0-6	207	166	64
Abitibi Eskimos	Iroquois Falls	26-16-0-6	177	174	58
Blind River Beavers	Blind River	26-18-0-4	201	180	56
Soo Thunderbirds	Sault Ste. Marie, ON	22-22-0-4	170	184	48
North Bay Skyhawks	North Bay	23-24-0-1	164	169	47
Manitoulin Islanders	Little Current	11-30-0-7	138	232	29

Teams listed on the official league website.

Standings listed on official league website.

== 2006-07 Copeland-McNamara Trophy Playoffs ==
Quarter-finals
1	Soo Indians	Bye
3	Abitibi	2
6	North Bay	4
2	Sudbury	4
7	Manitoulin	2
4	Blind River	3
5	Soo Thunderbirds	4

Semi-finals
1	Soo Indians	4
6	North Bay	3
2	Sudbury	4
5	Soo Thunderbirds	1

McNamara Trophy Finals
1	Soo Indians	4
2	Sudbury	1

Playoff results are listed on the official league website.

== Dudley Hewitt Cup Championship ==
Hosted by the Abitibi Eskimos in Iroquois Falls, Ontario. Abitibi finished third and Soo finished fourth.

Round Robin

Aurora Tigers (OPJHL) 4 - Soo Indians 1
Schreiber Diesels (SIJHL) 5 - Abitibi Eskimos 4
Abitibi Eskimos 4 - Soo Indians 2
Soo Indians 2 - Schreiber Diesels (SIJHL) 1
Aurora Tigers (OPJHL) 7 - Abitibi Eskimos 0

Semi-final

Schreiber Diesels (SIJHL) 6 - Abitibi Eskimos 5

== Scoring leaders ==
Note: GP = Games played; G = Goals; A = Assists; Pts = Points; PIM = Penalty minutes

Player	Team	GP	G	A	Pts	PIM
Scott Restoule	Sudbury Jr. Wolves	42	33	47	80	163
Brenden Biedermann	Sudbury Jr. Wolves	43	38	29	67	77
Dan Dube	Abitibi Eskimos	48	27	37	64	46
Matt Brunet	Abitibi Eskimos	48	24	39	63	20
Jon Drake	Blind River Beavers	43	29	33	62	16
Anthony Libonati	Blind River Beavers	43	26	33	59	86
Sean Farley	Soo Indians	45	31	27	58	65
Brett Perlini	Soo Thunderbirds	48	38	19	57	20
Tyler Gendron	Soo Thunderbirds	44	16	40	56	35
J. F. Houle	Sudbury Jr. Wolves	32	21	30	51	67

== Leading goaltenders ==
Note: GP = Games played; Mins = Minutes played; W = Wins; L = Losses: OTL = Overtime losses; SL = Shootout losses; GA = Goals Allowed; SO = Shutouts; GAA = Goals against average

Player	Team	GP	Mins	W	L	T	GA	SO	Sv%	GAA
Shawn Sirman	Blind River Beavers	24	1248:19	13	6	2	65	0	0.911	3.12
Brennan Poderzay	Soo Indians	22	1215:13	17	3	0	55	1	0.906	2.72
Darren Rowlandson	Sudbury Jr. Wolves	32	1794:57	18	11	1	101	0	0.902	3.38
Alain Valiquette	Sudbury Jr. Wolves	20	1059:02	10	7	0	58	0	0.902	3.29
Billy Stone	Manitoulin Islanders	31	1647:26	5	21	1	118	0	0.900	4.30

== Awards ==
- Player of the Year - Anthony Libonati (Blind River Beavers)
- Most Valuable Player - Dan Dube (Abitibi Eskimos)
- Most Gentlemanly Player - Matt Brunet (Abitibi Eskimos)
- Rookie of the Year - Brett Perlini (Soo Thunderbirds)
- Top Defenceman - Mitch Champagne (Abitibi Eskimos)
- Most Improved Player - Dylan King (Soo Thunderbirds)
- Top Defensive Forward - Jeremy Hilliard (Blind River Beavers)
- Top "Team Player" - Anthony Libonati (Blind River Beavers)
- Director of the Year - Scott Marshall (Abitibi Eskimos)
- Coach of the Year - Todd Stencill (Blind River Beavers)
- Team Goaltending Award - Brennan Poderzay, Elliot Hogue (Soo Indians)
- Top Goals Against Average - Brennan Poderzay (Soo Indians)
- Scoring Champion - Scott Restoule (Sudbury Jr. Wolves)
- Playoff Most Valuable Player - Brendan Biedermann (Sudbury Jr. Wolves)
- Scholastic Player of the Year - Brad Hummel (North Bay Skyhawks)

== See also ==
- 2007 Royal Bank Cup
- Dudley Hewitt Cup
- List of NOHA Junior A seasons
- Ontario Junior Hockey League
- Superior International Junior Hockey League
- Greater Ontario Junior Hockey League

Preceded by 2005–06 NOJHL season	NOJHL seasons	Succeeded by 2007–08 NOJHL season
