= WHA Junior Hockey League =

- Sport: Hockey
- Founded: 2006
- First season: 2006
- Folded: 2008
- CEO: Bobby Hull (Commissioner); Ricky Smith (President)
- No. of teams: 6 (original)
- Country: Canada
- Last champion: Oliver Jets
- Website: WHA Junior Hockey League

The WHA Junior Hockey League was an independent Canadian junior ice hockey league based out of British Columbia, Canada. The league marketed itself as a Junior A league, but was an unsanctioned independent loop with its own rules, processes and procedures, and was marked by franchise instability. Its team logos were based on the old WHA pro league of the 1970s.

== History ==
The first game in league history (when it was known as the WHA Junior West Hockey League) took place on September 21, 2006, between the Lumby Fighting Saints and the Armstrong Sharks in Armstrong, British Columbia. The result of the game was a 6-4 victory for Lumby.

On November 15, 2006, the Greater Metro Junior A Hockey League announced its affiliation with the World Hockey Association and the creation of the "National Junior Hockey Alliance," an agreement to play for the "Alliance Cup" between the GMHL playoff champion and the winner of the WHA Junior West Hockey League. On March 2, 2007, the JWHL final was awarded to New Westminster after winning the best of five series. Lumby pulled out of the league final after a financial dispute between Lumby's coach and the league; the league chose to remove Lumby's coach and continued the series without him. The Whalers won the last two games to take the league title. The Whalers moved on to compete for the Alliance Cup against the Greater Metro League's Bradford Rattlers, and were swept three games straight by the GMJHL champion.

On March 2, 2007, Vancouver Tours Bus Lines was awarded $71,348 CAD in unpaid fees by the WHA by a British Columbia Court.

The WHA lost its Bellingham franchise in the fall of 2007, but gained the Fort Vancouver Pioneers. The Pioneers received much scrutiny in USA Hockey's NorPac league due to allegations of "overcompensating" their players and violating their amateur status. The team was founded in 2003 as the Portland Pioneers and won two league championships. On October 28, 2007, the Fort Vancouver Pioneers ceased operations following the WHA reneging on travel arrangements made with the club. The Pioneers had a league best 7-1-0-0 record with 61 goals for and 27 goals against. Late in November, the transplanted 2007 champion Whalers (3-6-0-0 with 40 GF and 49 GA) seemingly folded and their players were moved in with the Osoyoos Spurs franchise. The remaining teams played little more than half the schedule before the season was cut short, and a "championship" series played between the Oliver Jets and the Armstrong Sharks.

After a second season cut short and the playoffs won by the Oliver Jets with little notice, there was no sign of any renewal of the "Alliance Cup."

In the summer of 2008, the WHA announced the addition of teams in Hope, Ashcroft, Nakusp, Clinton and Logan Lake. From the 2007-08 season, the WHA lost Barrhead, Fort Vancouver, Osoyoos, Squamish, and Vancouver, but announced that it had retained Armstrong, Lumby and Oliver. Furthermore, the league announced in July 2008 that it had secured affiliation deals with the Varkaus Eagles of Finland and Red Star-Sofia in Bulgaria. As part of the arrangement, WHA owner Ricky Smith was given control of the Eagles, but subsequently defaulted on a $75,000 bond and unilaterally folded the team. No WHA franchise apparently attempted to field a roster for the scheduled start of the 2008-2009 season, and no games were ever played. The last post to the league's website was on September 15, 2008 - which as of July 2009 was shut down for lack of payment - addressing the possible suspension by Hockey Canada of any player suiting up for a WHA team.

On January 16, 2009, the WHA was successfully sued by Global Developments Inc. for US$4.3 Million in losses in a District of Nevada courtroom for purposely diluting the worth of Global's interest in the company. In addition, the WHA was ordered to repay $277,386 in loans provided to them by Global. Under Smith, the share price of the WHA fell from $3.45 to less than one cent, before being taken off the trading market.

On November 24, 2009, Ricky Smith filed a lawsuit in British Columbia against Hockey Canada, the Pacific International Junior Hockey League, BC Hockey, former WHA Coach Matt Samson, and Squamish Manager of Recreational Services Janet Gugins. The charges stem from Smith's belief that Hockey Canada and BC Hockey maliciously targeted the WHA in the summer of 2008 with a series of bulletins targeted at keeping players from joining the WHA. The charges put against Samson, Gugins, and the PIJHL revolve around allegations that Samson and Gugins were in breach of a contract between them and the WHA when attempting to secure a PIJHL franchise. The outcome of the lawsuit is unclear.

== WHAJHL Teams ==
=== Former member teams ===
- Armstrong Sharks (2006–08)
- Barrhead River Kings (2007–08)
- Bellingham Bulls (2006–07)
- Fort Vancouver Pioneers (2007)
- Lumby Fighting Saints (2006–08)
- New Westminster Whalers (2006–07)

- Moved to Burnaby in 2007
- Moved to Vancouver in 2007
- Merged with Osoyoos in 2007

- Oliver Jets (2007–08)
- Osoyoos Spurs (2006–08)
- Squamish Cougars (2006–08)

=== Announced teams that never played ===
- Ashcroft Stingers (2008)
- Clinton Cowboys (2008)
- HNM Jr. A Canadians (2007)
- Hope Screaming Eagles (2008)
- Kitsap County Crusaders (2007)
- Logan Lake Toros (2008)
- Montreal Nordiques (2007)
- Nakusp Aeros (2008)
- NY Black Knights (2007)
- Quebec Gladiators (2007)

== Champions ==
2008 Oliver Jets
2007 New Westminster Whalers
