= 2008 Royal Bank Cup =

Tournament details
- Venue: Ed Lumley Arena in Cornwall, Ontario
- Dates: May 3, 2008 – May 11, 2008
- Teams: 5

Final positions
- Champions: Humboldt Broncos (2nd title)
- Runners-up: Camrose Kodiaks

Tournament statistics
- Games played: 13
- Scoring leader: Edward Gale (7 pts.) (Humboldt)

Awards
- MVP: Darcy Findlay (Cornwall)

The 2008 Royal Bank Cup was the 38th Junior "A" 2008 ice hockey National Championship for the Canadian Junior Hockey League. The national championship was won by the Humboldt Broncos of the Saskatchewan Junior Hockey League.

The Royal Bank Cup was competed for by the winners of the Doyle Cup, Anavet Cup, Dudley Hewitt Cup, the Fred Page Cup and the host team, the Cornwall Colts of the Central Junior A Hockey League.

The tournament ran from May 3–11, 2008 with games played at the Ed Lumley Arena in Cornwall, Ontario.

== Teams ==
- Cornwall Colts (Host) - The Colts are the hosts of the Royal Bank Cup. They lost the Central Junior A Hockey League quarter-final and have not played since. The Colts struggled through the first half of their season and were inconsistent in the second half. Finishing second in their division, the Colts finished sixth place in an eleven team league. This ranking resulted their first round match up with the dominant Smiths Falls Bears, who made quick work of the Colts.

Regular Season: 31 wins, 24 losses, 1 tie, 4 overtime losses
Playoffs: Lost to Smiths Falls Bears 1-4

- Camrose Kodiaks (Pacific) - The Kodiaks are the Alberta Junior Hockey League and Doyle Cup champions. The Kodiaks are led by CJAHL Player of the Year Joe Colborne. Colborne is ranked 28th overall by NHL Central Scouting for the 2008 NHL entry draft.

Regular Season: 49 wins, 8 losses, 5 overtime losses
Playoffs: Defeated Olds Grizzlys 4-2, Defeated Drumheller Dragons 4-1, Defeated Fort McMurray Oil Barons 4-3, Defeated Penticton Vees (BCHL) 4-1

- Humboldt Broncos (Western) - The Broncos are the Saskatchewan Junior Hockey League and Anavet Cup champions. The Broncos survived a scare in the SJHL Final, coming back from a 3–1 deficit to the underdog Kindersley Klippers. The Broncos made quick work of the MJHL champion Portage Terriers in the Anavet Cup, sweeping them in four games.

Regular Season: 48 wins, 9 losses, 1 overtime loss
Playoffs: Defeated Nipawin Hawks 4-2, Defeated Flin Flon Bombers 4-0, Defeated Kindersley Klippers 4-3, Defeated Portage Terriers (MJHL) 4-0

- Oakville Blades (Central) - The Blades are the Ontario Provincial Junior A Hockey League and Dudley Hewitt Cup champions. Star goaltender Scott Greenham will not be attending the tournament despite leading the Blades to the OPJHL and Central Canadian Championships. Having accepted a scholarship to play for the Alaska Nanooks, he would lose his NCAA eligibility if he played in the Royal Bank Cup because his age (21).

Regular Season: 39 wins, 6 losses, 4 overtime losses
Playoffs: Defeated Milton Icehawks 4-1, Defeated Georgetown Raiders 4-1, Defeated Aurora Tigers 4-2, Defeated Markham Waxers 4-1, Won Dudley Hewitt Cup (4-0)

- Weeks Crushers (Eastern) - The Crushers are the Fred Page Cup champions. They lost the Maritime Junior A Hockey League semi-final, but hosted and won the Fred Page Cup. The Crushers upset the CJAHL's top ranked team, the Pembroke Lumber Kings, in the Eastern Canadian final.

Regular Season: 35 wins, 22 losses, 2 overtime losses
Playoffs: Defeated Truro Bearcats 4-2, Lost to Yarmouth Mariners 1-4, Hosted and Won Fred Page Cup (4-1)

== Event ==
The 2008 Royal Bank Cup was kicked off with an announcement from the CJAHL that it was shortening its name to the Canadian Junior Hockey League.

The first game of the tournament was between the Western Champion Humboldt Broncos and the Host Cornwall Colts. The Colts, who finished the season barely breathing and only played five playoff games, held the Broncos to only one goal in the first period. In the second period, the Colts fell apart and allowed six more goals on the next 16 shots over the last forty minutes. Humboldt's Laurent Benjamin scored a hat trick, while Taylor Nelson made 21 saves in the 7–0 shutout victory.

The early game on day two was between the Eastern Champion Weeks Crushers and the Pacific Champion Camrose Kodiaks. Weeks came out strong and took an early 1–0 lead, but the Crushers started taking a lot of penalties which killed their momentum. The Kodiaks scored five unanswered goals to win the game 5–1. In the late game, the Eastern Champion Oakville Blades challenged Cornwall. The Blades came out flat and left the first period down 2–0. Oakville returned on fire in the second period, scoring three goals in less than three and a half minutes. The momentum did not last, and the Colts took advantage by eventually pulling out an unexpected 5–4 victory.

On day three, the Kodiaks defeated the Broncos 2–1 in a very close game. The Broncos led the game until the final nine minutes by a score of 1–0, but the Kodiaks finally solved Taylor Nelson's 111+ minute shutout streak by score two quick goals to win the game. The late game placed the Oakville Blades against the Weeks Crushers. The Blades outshot the Crushers 49–25, but the Crushers kept it close and came from behind to tie it in the third period. The Crushers took advantage of a Too Many Men penalty in the extra frame as Geoff Hum scored a powerplay marker to win the game for the Crushers.

The only game of day four was between the Host Colts and the Fred Page Cup champion Weeks Crushers based in New Glasgow, Nova Scotia. A strong opening period from the hometown Colts allowed for a 3–0 lead that was never breached by the Crushers. A lone goal by the Crushers in the second period would be as close as they would get to the Colts. Another three goal period by Cornwall in the final frame sealed the deal as the Colts skated to a 6–1 win.

On day five, the early game had the Oakville Blades, on the brink of elimination, versus the Humboldt Broncos. The Broncos blew three leads in the game; 1–0, 2–1, and 5–3; to allow the Blades to live another day with a 7–6 victory. The loss for the Broncos kills their ability to clinch a semi-final spot before their final game. The next game was between Cornwall and Camrose. Cornwall came out to send a message and caught the Kodiaks on their heels. Camrose came out with a tight 2–1 victory despite badly outshooting them. Because of Humboldt's loss, both Camrose and Cornwall clinch a spot in the semi-finals.

Despite the fact that they didn't play each other on day six, the day was a battle between Oakville and Humboldt. If Weeks defeated Humboldt, Oakville was in and Humboldt was out. If Oakville beat the undefeated Kodiaks in a game that meant nothing to them statistically, Humboldt was out and Oakville was in. If Humboldt won, they were in. If neither Weeks or Oakville won, Humboldt was in. The day began by the Humboldt showing their worth in a 4–1 victory over the Weeks Crushers. The day closed out with Camrose dismantling the Oakville Blades 6–1, even though the Blades outshot them.

After six days of play, the Oakville Blades were eliminated from the tournament by virtue of their head-to-head loss to the Weeks Crushers. The Blades were suspect in the goaltending department. Goalie Oliver Wren sported an 0.810 save percentage, the worst amongst starting goaltenders in the tourney. Wren came into the tournament cold, having barely played in Oakville's long playoff run. Season and Playoff long starter Scott Greenham, left the team in the middle of the Dudley Hewitt Cup and could not return due to NCAA eligibility issues.

=== Semi-finals ===
The Camrose Kodiaks defeated the Weeks Crushers by a score of 3–0 in the early semi-final. Two early first period goals and a strong patient defense held off the Crushers' attack. A late goal was added by the Kodiaks to ensure a fifth straight tournament victory.

In the late semi-final, the host Cornwall Colts played off against the Humboldt Broncos. The Broncos proved dominant, but the Colts kept the score tight. The score was 2-1 Humboldt after the first and 3-1 after the second, but the Colts could not hold on any longer as the Broncos cracked the twine three times in the third to complete the 6-1 route.

=== Final ===
The RBC final was a battle of the goaltenders. Columbus Blue Jackets draft pick Allen York 27 of 28 shots for the Camrose Kodiaks, while a rock solid Taylor Nelson held a 31-save shutout for the Humboldt Broncos to win the Royal Bank Cup. Nelson made a game saving glove save with less than a second to go to hold on for Humboldt's second ever Royal Bank Cup. The game-winning goal was scored by Edward Gale in the first period on the power play. Gale is the cousin of former NHLer Gary Leeman. This marks the fourth time in six years that the Kodiaks have made the RBC tournament and have failed to win. The victory for the Humboldt Broncos marks their first national championship since 2003.

== Tournament ==
=== Round Robin ===
Pos	League (Ticket)	Team	Pld	W	L	GF	GA	GD	Qualification
1	AJHL (Doyle Cup)	Camrose Kodiaks	4	4	0	15	4	+11	Semi-final
2	SJHL (Anavet Cup)	Humboldt Broncos	4	2	2	18	10	+8	Semi-final
3	CJHL (Host)	Cornwall Colts	4	2	2	12	14	−2	Semi-final
4	MJAHL (Fred Page Cup)	Weeks Crushers	4	1	3	7	18	−11	Semi-final
5	OPJHL (Dudley Hewitt Cup)	Oakville Blades	4	1	3	15	21	−6	

==== Results ====
Round-robin results
Game	Team	Score	Team	Score	Notes
Saturday, May 3, 2008
1	Humboldt	7	Cornwall	0	Final - Shots: 27-21 HUM
Sunday, May 4, 2008
2	Weeks	1	Camrose	5	Final - Shots: 34-18 CAM
3	Cornwall	5	Oakville	4	Final - Shots: 33-23 OAK
Monday, May 5, 2008
4	Humboldt	1	Camrose	2	Final - Shots: 28-26 CAM
5	Oakville	3	Weeks	4	OT Final - Shots: 45-29 OAK
Tuesday, May 6, 2008
6	Cornwall	6	Weeks	1	Final - Shots: 36-26 COR
Wednesday, May 7, 2008
7	Oakville	7	Humboldt	6	Final - Shots: 35-33 OAK
8	Camrose	2	Cornwall	1	Final - Shots: 29-11 CAM
Thursday, May 8, 2008
9	Weeks	1	Humboldt	4	Final - Shots: 46-26 HUM
10	Camrose	6	Oakville	1	Final - Shots: 26-25 OAK

=== Semi-final ===
Semi-final Results
Game	Team	Score	Team	Score	Notes
Saturday, May 10, 2008
11	Camrose (1st)	3	Weeks (4th)	0	Final - Shots: 31-17 CAM
12	Humboldt (2nd)	6	Cornwall (3rd)	1	Final - Shots: 30-21 HUM

=== Final ===
RBC Final Results
Game	Team	Score	Team	Score	Notes
Sunday, May 11, 2008
13	Camrose	0	Humboldt	1	Final - Shots: 31-28 CAM

== Awards ==
Roland Mercier Trophy (Tournament MVP): Darcy Findlay (Cornwall Colts)
Top Forward: Jeremy Welsh (Oakville Blades)
Top Defencemen: Brady Wacker (Humboldt Broncos)
Top Goaltender: Allen York (Camrose Kodiaks)
Tubby Smaltz Trophy (Sportsmanship): Andre Herman (Camrose Kodiaks)

== Roll of League Champions ==
AJHL: Camrose Kodiaks
BCHL: Penticton Vees
CJHL: Pembroke Lumber Kings
MJHL: Portage Terriers
MJAHL: Yarmouth Mariners
NOJHL: Sudbury Jr. Wolves
OPJHL: Oakville Blades
QJAAAHL: Sherbrooke Cougars
SJHL: Humboldt Broncos
SIJHL: Dryden Ice Dogs

== See also ==
- Canadian Junior A Hockey League
- Royal Bank Cup
- Anavet Cup
- Doyle Cup
- Dudley Hewitt Cup
- Fred Page Cup
