= South Muskoka Shield =

- City: Gravenhurst, Ontario, Canada
- League: Greater Metro Junior A Hockey League
- Founded: 2006
- Folded: 2023
- Home arena: Graeme Murray Arena
- Colours: Red, black, and white
- Owner(s): Troy Kahler & Erika Rendon-Kahler
- General manager: Troy Kahler
- Head coach: Troy Kahler
- Media: TVCogeco; 99.5 Moose FM; Gravenhurst Banner

The Muskoka Shield were a Canadian junior ice hockey team based in Gravenhurst, Ontario. The Shield were members of the Greater Metro Junior A Hockey League (GMHL).

== History ==
The Shield are a community-based team with a number of corporate sponsors helping the team to be a viable club. Originally playing in Gravenhurst, Ontario, the Shield followed the Gravenhurst Indians and the Gravenhurst Cubs who played in the Georgian Mid-Ontario Junior C Hockey League from 1980 to 1987 and 1994 to 2000, respectively.

The South Muskoka Shield Goaltender in action (2006)

The Shield's first game was on September 9, 2006, against the Deseronto Thunder in Deseronto, Ontario, and an 8–1 loss. The Shield's first goal was scored by Dustin Curran. Their first home game at the Gravenhurst Centennial Centre took place on September 15, 2006, against the eventual league, playoff, and Alliance Cup champion Bradford Rattlers. The result was a 10–1 blowout loss. The Shield's first win came on October 13, 2006, against the struggling Toronto Canada Moose by a score of 9–6.

On November 21, 2006, Shield left winger and captain Garrett Hamel was heavily injured in a head-on collision. He was flown to Sunnybrook Hospital in Toronto and required surgery to repair his broken talus, knee cap, femur, radius, pinky finger, and a shattered pelvis. The next game, on November 22 against the Nipissing Alouettes, was cancelled out of respect of the Hanmer, Ontario, native. After extensive rehab, Garrett rejoined the team in November 2007. On January 11, 2008, Garrett returned to the ice against the Nipissing Alouettes and scored a goal in a 9–5 victory for the Shield.

The Shield finished their inaugural season in dead last with a 4–34–0–4 record. Seventh place out of seven teams, the Shield were forced to face the fourth-place Deseronto Thunder in the league quarter-final. In game one, the Thunder blew out the Shield 7–1, but in game two the Shield took the Thunder to overtime but still lost 5–4. Game three saw the Shield lead after the first period 3–1 and the second 5–3. In the third, the Shield fell apart and the Thunder outscored them in the third 6–1. The game was called early due to violence breaking out at the game with both the Shield bench and the crowd involved; final score 9–6 Thunder. Game four was another overtime showdown, which the again Shield lost 5–4 in overtime, to complete the four-game sweep for the Deseronto Thunder.

On January 3, 2008, the Shield hosted the Moscow Selects All-star team in an exhibition game. The Selects won the game by a score of 5–1. This was the fifth game of seven that the Moscow team played against different GMHL clubs.

The 2007–08 season saw an improved South Muskoka Shield take the ice. At times, the Shield were ranked among the top of the GMHL, but faltered slightly late in the season to drop to a record of 19 wins, 18 losses, and 5 losses in overtime. The Shield had the best season-to-season record improvement of any of the seven clubs that also participated in the 2006–07 season. The Shield elected to take a bye in the first round of the playoffs and found themselves in the quarter-finals with the defending champions Bradford Rattlers. The Shield, who managed to be one of the few teams to defeat the Rattlers over the course of the last two seasons, fought a tough series. They kept each game rather tight, but ended up being eliminated 4-games-to-1.

On December 29, 2008, the South Muskoka Shield played an exhibition game against Kazakhstan's Torpedo UST-Kamenogorsk Under-18 squad. The Shield won the game 5–4 despite a late rally by the Torpedo. The Shield finished the 2008–09 season with a record of 38 wins, 4 losses, and 1 overtime loss, to finish first in the league and win the John Klinck Award.

On April 2, 2011, the South Muskoka Shield lost the Russell Cup championship in game seven to the Elliot Lake Bobcats, 8–5.

On September 20, 2013, in Rosseau, Ontario, the Shield organization was awarded the 2013 Muskoka Community Award for its contributions to local community and for its work with and donations to the non-for-profit A Child's Voice Foundation.

For the 2018–19 season, the Shield management had been unhappy with the Gravenhurst officials pushing back their Friday evening start times to 8:30pm at Graeme Murray Arena in the Gravenhurst Centennial Centre. After slow communication with the city officials, the team decided to play its home games at Port Carling Arena in Port Carling, Ontario. The team was replaced in Gravenhurst by the Muskoka Anglers of the Canadian Premier Junior Hockey League. The Shield played one season in Port Carling before relocating to Bracebridge Memorial Arena in Bracebridge, Ontario, for 2019–20. In 2020, the Shield returned to Graeme Murray Arena in Gravenhurst.

Before the 2023–24 season, the club was suspended by the league management.

== Season-by-season standings ==
Season	GP	W	L	T	OTL	GF	GA	Pts	Regular season finish	Playoffs
2006–07	42	4	34	—	4	110	299	12	7th GMHL	Lost quarter-finals, 0–4 (Thunder)
2007–08	42	19	18	—	5	207	207	43	7th GMHL	Lost quarter-finals, 1–4 (Rattlers)
2008–09	43	38	4	—	1	303	128	77	1st of 15, GMHL	Won Div. Quarter-finals, 3–0 (Bucks); Won Div. Semi-finals, 3–0 (Alouettes); Won Div. Finals, 4–1 (Bobcats); Won League Finals, 4–2 (Storm)
2009–10	42	35	5	—	2	228	121	72	2nd of 12, GMHL	Won quarter-finals, 3–0 (Wild); Won semi-finals, 4–1 (Rattlers); Lost finals, 3–4 (Storm)
2010–11	42	36	5	—	1	280	151	73	2nd of 13, GMHL	Won quarter-finals, 3–0 (77's); Won semi-finals, 4–3 (Rattlers); Lost finals, 3–4 (Bobcats)
2011–12	42	29	9	—	4	255	126	62	4th of 13, GMHL	Won Bye Round, 3–0 (Avalanche); Won quarter-finals, 3–1 (Bobcats); Lost semi-finals, 0–4 (Titans)
2012–13	42	27	13	0	2	219	168	56	4th of 15, GMHL	Won Div. Quarter-finals, 3–0 (Lumberjacks); Lost div. semi-finals, 0–3 (Phantoms)
2013–14	42	33	6	—	3	324	152	69	3rd of 20, GMHL	Won Div. Quarter-finals, 3–0 (Eagles); Lost div. semi-finals, 2–3 (Titans)
2014–15	42	35	6	—	1	302	149	71	1st of 10, North Div. 3rd of 22, GMHL	Won Div. Semi-finals, 3–0 (Knights); Lost Div. Finals, 1–3 (Huskies)
2015–16	42	36	5	0	1	277	117	73	1st of 10, North Div. 3rd of 30, GMHL	Won Div. Quarter-finals, 3–0 (Falcons); Won Div. Semi-finals, 3–2 (Islanders); Lost Div. Finals, 2–4 (Spartans)
2016–17	42	26	10	0	6	248	142	58	3rd of 10, North Div. 7th of 21, GMHL	Won Div. Quarter-finals, 3–2 (Spartans); Lost div. semi-finals, 1–3 (Islanders)
2017–18	42	14	24	0	4	143	173	32	8th of 9, North Div. 15th of 21, GMHL	Won 8th Pl. Qualifying Game, 6–5 OT (Huskies); Lost div. quarter-finals, 0–2 (Spartans)
2018–19	42	14	25	0	3	145	213	31	9th of 10, North Div. 19th of 22, GMHL	Won Qualifying Game, 4–3 OT (Sharpshooters); Lost 8th Pl. Qualifying game, 1–6 (Knights)
2019–20	42	13	26	0	3	144	238	29	9th of 10, North Div. 20th of 23, GMHL	Won 9th Pl. Qualifying Game, 6–4 (Knights); Lost 8th Pl. Qualifying game, 3–7 (Lynx)
2020–21	Season lost to COVID-19 pandemic									
2021–22	39	9	26	0	2	144	238	20	9th of 10, North Div. 17th of 19, GMHL	Won 9th Pl. Qualifying Game, 6–5 (Spartans); Lost 8th Pl. Qualifying game, 4-6 (Civics)
2022–23	42	12	26	0	4	145	257	28	6th of 7, North Div. 13th of 16, GMHL	Lost div. quarter-finals, 0-2 (Knights)
2023–24	Suspend by League									

== League award winners ==
- Bob Bernstein Award

An annual award "to the player who accumulates the most points in the regular season"
- (Canada) Donny Danroth 2014

- Louis Ricci Award

An annual award "to the forward who demonstrates throughout the season the greatest ability at the position"
- (United States) Travis Saltz 2009
- (Latvia) Nikita Jevpalovs 2011

- Tyler Fines Award

An annual award "to the player selected as the most proficient in his first year of competition in the GMHL"
- (Latvia) Nikita Jevpalovs 2011

- Vincent Labranche Award

An annual award "to the player adjudged to have exhibited the best type of sportsmanship and gentlemanly conduct combined with a high standard of playing ability"
- (Canada) Dylan Sontag 2009
- (Canada) Dylan Sontag 2010

- Naz Marchese Award

An annual award "to the forward who demonstrates throughout the season the greatest ability at the position of defensive forward"
- (Canada) Chad Meagher 2009
- (Canada) Chad Meagher 2010
- (Canada) Brandon Luksa 2014

- Mark Trost Award

An annual award "to the defenseman who demonstrates throughout the season the greatest ability at the position"
- (Canada) Adam MacBeth 2010

- Ken Girard Award

An annual award "to the GMHL coach adjudged to have contributed the most to his team's success"
- (Canada) Dallyn Telford 2010
- (Canada) Frank Demasi 2015

- Al Donnan Award

An annual award "to the goaltender adjudged to be the best at his position"
- (Canada) Mark Wardell 2010
- (United States) Rob Sutherland 2011

== Notable alumni ==
- Nikita Jevpalovs
- Eric Fraser Pye
