= Temiscaming Royals =

- City: Témiscaming, Quebec, Canada
- League: Northern Ontario Junior Hockey League
- Division: Eastern
- Operated: 2007-2011
- Home arena: Le Centre de Temiscaming
- Colours: Green, Black, and White

The Temiscaming Royals were a Junior ice hockey team based in Témiscaming, Quebec, Canada. They were members of the Northern Ontario Junior Hockey League, but originated in the Greater Metro Junior A Hockey League.

== History ==
The announcement of the Temiscaming Royals as the first Quebec-based team in the Greater Metro Junior A Hockey League came on April 4, 2007.

The expansion of the Royals makes them the ninth team in the independent GMHL and one of six 2007 expansion teams. Temiscaming is roughly 65 kilometers from North Bay, Ontario and will make for decent locational rivalries with the Nipissing Alouettes and Espanola Kings.

The Temiscaming Royals played their first game on September 7, 2007 in Verner, Ontario against the Nipissing Alouettes. The Royals defeated the Alouettes 6-4 for their first ever win.

The Royals were undefeated in regulation in their first fourteen games of the season. Their first loss came on November 1, 2007, 7-4, at the hands of the Nipissing Alouettes, largely in part to Alouettes former goaltender Tristan Jones and his 58 save performance. The Royals would later acquire Jones at the deadline to help Piche guide the Royals on their playoff run.

On January 4, 2008, the Royals hosted the Moscow Selects All-star team in an exhibition game. The Selects won the game by a score of 9-3. This was the sixth game of seven that the Moscow team played against different GMHL clubs.

In the 07-08 Greater Metro Junior A playoffs, the Temiscaming Royals selected to play the Espanola Kings in the 1st round. Game 1 took place in Temiscaming with the Royals defeating the Kings with a score of 8-0 to win their first ever playoff game in team history. Marc Desgagnes recorded the first ever Temiscaming Royals playoff goal in the team's history. Guillaume Piche recorded the first ever win and shutout in the club's playoff history.

In June 2008, the GMHL announced that the Royals have left the league with ambitions of joining the NOJHL. Temsicaming is the second Québécois team in NOJHL history, after the Rouyn-Noranda Capitales who were in the league from 1989 to 1996.

On September 7, 2008, the Royals played their first Northern Ontario Jr. game against the North Bay Skyhawks. The Skyhawks won 2-0. The Royals first NOJHL win came on September 19, 2008, as they defeated the Sudbury Jr. Wolves 9-5 at home.

On December 4, 2010, Matt Zawadzki recorded a 48 save shutout against the Abitibi Eskimos. With his shutout he has the Royals first ever shutout in NOJHL history.

On May 7, 2011, the NOJHL's Spring AGM was concluded. The Royals were officially listed as disbanded from the league. Owner Steve McCharles has failed to make a deal with a group from Temiscaming for a sale. That group turned around and negotiated with the Town of Temiscaming and created a new team in the GMHL called the Temiscaming Titans and took the Royals' allotted ice time. McCharles then failed to make a deal with an ownership group from Kirkland Lake, Ontario and left the team to fold.

== Season-by-season standings ==
Season	GP	W	L	T	OTL	GF	GA	P	Results	Playoffs
2007-08	42	31	9	-	2	258	135	64	2nd GMHL	Lost semi-final
2008-09	50	17	29	-	4	173	238	38	7th NOJHL	Lost quarter-final
2009-10	50	14	32	-	4	178	252	32	7th NOJHL	Lost quarter-final
2010-11	50	18	29	-	3	205	247	39	7th NOJHL	Lost quarter-final
4 Seasons	192	80	99	0	13	814	872	--	0.456	--

=== Playoffs ===
- 2008 Lost semi-final

Temiscaming Royals defeated Espanola Kings 4-games-to-none in bye round
Temiscaming Royals defeated King Wild 4-games-to-2 in quarter-final
Innisfil Lakers defeated Temiscaming Royals 4-games-to-2 in semi-final

- 2009 Lost quarter-final

North Bay Skyhawks defeated Temiscaming Royals 4-games-to-none in quarter-final

- 2010 Lost quarter-final

Abitibi Eskimos defeated Temiscaming Royals 4-games-to-one in quarter-final

- 2011 Lost quarter-final

Sudbury Jr. Wolves defeated Temiscaming Royals 4-games-to-none in quarter-final

== Head coaches ==
	Nat	From	To	Regular Season				Playoffs		
	Nat	From	To	G	W	L	OTL	G	W	L
Steve McCharles	(Canada)	2007	2011	176	77	86	13	25	11	14
Chris Cloutier	(Canada)	2011	2011	16	3	13	0	4	0	4

== Team captains ==
- Michael Sauvageau, 2007–08
- Pier-Paul Landry, 2008–09
- No Captain, 2009–10
- Robin Mendelsohn, 2010–11

== All Time Royals ==
Guillaume Piche	Kevin Wierda	Brian Lawson	Sebastien Porier
Lance McMahon	Rob Ridell	Ryan Larocque	Mike Mesaros
Jean-Sebastien Gagne-Bisson	Felix Gilbert	Michael Sauvageau	Guillaume Brisebois
Marcus Brien	Axel Bousquet	Andrew Bobas	Pier-Paul Landry
Darcy Vaillancourt	Marc Desgagnes	Cedric Boutin	Alain Pouliot
Chris Shawanda	Darren Shecapio	Kory Cashaback	Brad Clark
Benoit Fiset	Alexandre Brazeau	Corey Raymond	Sylvain Babin
Clayton Happyjack	Oliver Deschenes	Matt Rogers	Tyler Dever
Sebany Guimond	Chris Hebert	Cory Marquardt	Rylan Henley
Jessy Lecours	Niko Tonello	Caleb Buehrer	Tristan Awashish
Brandon Blanche	Stephan Gunner	Francis Bernard	Michael Gauthier
Jim Murray	Jeff Lobman	Tyler Stevenson	Rylan Gull-Chum
Robbie Bird	Mike Heino	Shayne Derochers	Maxime Gauthier
Shane Golden	Andre Leclair	Robin Mendelshon	Kelvin Blackned
Justin Murray	Tim Revell	Tristan Jones	Chris Fraser
Joshua Blacksmith	Adam Avison	Alexander Cooper	Justin Kohler
Pierrick Picard-Fiset	Ben Bruha	Mike Robertson	Rick Batenburg
Nick Turro	Eric Rochefort	Stephen McGeary	Jason Sills
Josh Ogden	Ryan Davis	Braedun Ruud	Zac Wourms
Gilbert Neeposh	Anthony Gagnon	Zac Himmel	Ben Collins
Erwin Bosum	Mikell Bilodeau	Matt Zawadzki	Jesse Berthiaume
T.J. Tootoo	Zachary Moses	Thomas Brown	Tanner Miness
Eddie Slade	Cole Workman	Jean-Michel Naud	Jordan Cunningham
Griffen Hodges	Brandon Windsor	Jonathan Hannums	Christopher Saganash
Bruce-Lee George	Brendan Phelps	Casey Restoule	Randall Blackned
Dave Pelchat	Adam Newkirk	Samuel Sandford-Roy	Jeremie Brisebois
Sam Matthews	Todd Knaus	Lonnie Murphy	Andrew Glasser

== Sources ==
- "New Hockey North Hall of Fame inducts first members". BayToday.ca. Village Media. 7 August 2025.
