= 2014–15 CIHL season =

- League: Canadian International Hockey League
- Sport: Hockey
- Duration: Regular season 2014-10-04 – 2015-02-28; Playoffs; TBD – TBD
- Teams: 4 (Started with 8)
- Finals champions: TBD

CIHL seasons
- 2015–16

The 2014–15 CIHL season was the inaugural season of the Canadian International Hockey League (CIHL). The four teams of the CIHL played 42-game schedules.

In February 2015, the top teams of the league played down for the league championship. Since the CIHL is independent from Hockey Canada and the Canadian Junior Hockey League, this is when the CIHL's season ended.

== Changes ==
- League announces expansion into Espanola, Colborne, Bracebridge, St. Charles, Greater Sudbury, Batchewana, Collingwood, Barrie, Milton, and Toronto.
- Bracebridge and Barrie leave the league without playing.
- League joins United Hockey Union before season starts.
- On Nov. 10, league leaves UHU and adds American team from Kalkaska.
- Collingwood Ice, Milton Cobras, Colborne Cramahe Hawks, and Toronto Hockey Academy all elect to leave the league over insurance dispute, form World United Hockey League.
- St. Charles Spirit cease operations.

== Current Standings ==
Note: GP = Games played; W = Wins; L = Losses; OTL = Overtime losses; SL = Shootout losses; GF = Goals for; GA = Goals against; PTS = Points; x = clinched playoff berth; y = clinched division title; z = clinched conference title

Team	Centre	W-L-T-OTL	Points
Batchewana Attack	Sault Ste. Marie	14-0-0-0	28
Espanola Rivermen	Espanola	9-5-0-0	18
Kalkaska Rhinos	Kalkaska, MI	1-3-0-1	3
Greater Sudbury Royals	Capreol	0-12-0-0	0
St. Charles Spirit	St. Charles	8-5-0-1	17
Collingwood Ice	Collingwood	8-1-0-0	16
Milton Cobras	Milton	4-2-0-1	9
Toronto Hockey Academy	Toronto	1-5-0-2	4
Colborne Cramahe Hawks	Colborne	1-8-0-0	2

Please note: Shaded teams are no longer league members.

Teams listed on the official league website.

Standings listed on official league website.

== 2015 Playoffs ==
To be determined.

Playoff results are listed on the official league website.

== Scoring leaders ==
Note: GP = Games played; G = Goals; A = Assists; Pts = Points; PIM = Penalty minutes

Player / Team / GP / G / A / Pts / PIM

== Leading goaltenders ==
Note: GP = Games played; Mins = Minutes played; W = Wins; L = Losses: OTL = Overtime losses; SL = Shootout losses; GA = Goals Allowed; SO = Shutouts; GAA = Goals against average

Player / Team / GP / Mins / W / L / T / GA / SO / Sv% / GAA

== Awards ==
- Top Scorer:
- Most Valuable Player:
- Rookie of the Year:
- Top Forward:
- Top Defenceman:
- Top Goaltender:
- Top Defensive Forward:
- Most Sportsmanlike Player:
- Most Heart:
- Top Coach:

== See also ==
- 2014 in ice hockey
- 2015 in ice hockey

Preceded by Inaugural	CIHL seasons	Succeeded by 2015–16 CIHL season
