= 2016–17 CPJHL season =

- League: Canadian Premier Junior Hockey League
- Sport: Ice hockey
- Duration: 48 games
- Teams: 8
- Season champions: Muskoka Wild
- Finals champions: Almonte Jr. Sharpshooters

Seasons
- none 2017–18

The 2016–17 CPJHL season is the inaugural season of the Canadian Premier Junior Hockey League (CPJHL). The eight teams of the CPJHL play a 48-game schedule.

== League formation ==
The CPJHL was announced in the spring of 2016. Originally, eleven teams were divided into two divisions and scheduled to begin play in September. The league plans to feature a 48-game schedule concluding in March and include an all-star game, college showcase event, and a league playoff. The league gained sanctioning by the United Hockey Union (UHU), the junior hockey branch of the Amateur Athletic Union, in June 2016.

Before the league's first season would start, several of the announced teams had some further organizational changes:

- Burk's Falls was initially introduced as the Warriors, but an ownership change saw the team renamed the Bruins.
- The Almonte Jr. Sharpshooters were initially announced as the Ottawa Sharpshooters before making Almonte Community Center the home for the junior club. The Sharpshooters also included a U-18 team that compete in the National College Prospects Hockey League, another UHU league.
- On September 16, the day the first games were set to take place, the league announced that the Akwesasne Chiefs and Coldwater Falcons would not play in the first season due to lack of players on each team.

Both the Burk's Falls Bruins and Norwood Nemesis were granted delayed starts to their seasons due to a coaching change for the Bruins and lack of players for both teams. However, after the second week of the season, the Bruins still had trouble with recruiting enough players to fill their roster and the CPJHL decided to suspend the team for the season.

== Standings ==
Final standings
Note: W = Wins; L = Losses; T = Ties; OTL = Overtime losses; GF = Goals for; GA = Goals against; Pts = Points; Pct = Points percentage; x = clinched playoff berth; y = clinched division title; z = clinched league title.

East division
Team	Centre	W	L	T	OTL	GF	GA	Pts	Pct
Almonte Jr. Sharpshooters	Almonte, Ontario	34	8	1	2	206	94	71	0.789
Glengarry Highlanders	Maxville, Ontario	23	19	1	5	192	177	52	0.542
O-Town Rebels	Ottawa, Ontario	23	19	0	2	170	153	48	0.545
Norwood Nemesis	Norwood, Ontario	7	37	2	1	89	247	17	0.181
West division
Team	Centre	W	L	T	OTL	GF	GA	Pts	Pct
Muskoka Wild	Port Carling, Ontario	35	7	3	3	197	110	76	0.792
Essa Stallions	Angus, Ontario	29	13	1	5	204	138	64	0.667
Grey Highlands Hawks	Markdale, Ontario	29	18	1	0	216	149	59	0.615
Seaforth Generals	Seaforth, Ontario	3	44	1	0	96	298	7	0.073

== Playoffs ==
All teams qualify for the playoffs and seeded one through eight, with the highest seed facing the lowest remaining seed in the first round. The first round is a two-game series with a total goal aggregate. After the first round, the four remaining teams play a round robin with the top two teams meeting in a championship game.

=== First round ===
(1) Muskoka Wild vs. (8) Seaforth Generals
Team	March 10	March 12	Total Goals
Wild	8	6	14
Generals	0	5	5

(3) Essa Stallions vs. (6) O-Town Rebels
Team	March 8	March 11	Total Goals
Stallions	7	—	7
Rebels	3	Forfeit	3

(2) Almonte Jr. Sharpshooters vs. (7) Norwood Nemesis
Team	March 11	March 12	Total Goals
Jr. Sharpshooters	3	9	12
Nemesis	1	1	2

(4) Grey Highlands Hawks vs. (5) Glengarry Highlanders
Team	March 10	March 12	Total Goals
Hawks	9	4	13
Highlanders	3	6	9

=== Round Robin ===
Team	W	L	OTL	GF	GA	GD
Muskoka Wild	3	0	0	16	4	+12
Almonte Jr. Sharpshooters	2	1	0	9	9	0
Essa Stallions	1	1	1	9	12	-3
Grey Highlands Hawks	0	2	1	8	17	-9

=== President's Cup Championship game ===
Team	Period				Final
Team	1st	2nd	3rd	OT	Final
Jr. Sharpshooters	2	1	0	1	4
Wild	0	0	3	0	3
