= Cobourg Galaxy =

- City: Baltimore, Ontario
- League: Canadian Premier Junior Hockey League
- Division: East
- Founded: 2016
- Folded: 2017
- Home arena: Baltimore Recreation Centre
- Owner(s): Brian Bell
- General manager: Brian Bell
- Head coach: Brian Bell

Franchise history
- 2016–2017: Norwood Nemesis
- 2017: Coburg Galaxy

The Cobourg Galaxy were a United Hockey Union-sanctioned junior ice hockey team that played in Baltimore, Ontario, near Cobourg. They were a member of the Canadian Premier Junior Hockey League.

== History ==
Formed in 2016 as the Norwood Nemesis, the franchise began play in the 2016–17 season. The Nemesis went through several management changes during the season, including their head coach. Mike Jeschke was named the first coach, but was replaced before the season opener by Chad Birkhof in September. Another change was made in January when Wayne Verge replaced Birkhof, who resigned.

One-time AHCA All-American Brian Bell, the second all-time leading scorer at SUNY Potsdam after playing two seasons (1983–85), bought the team on January 31, 2017.

The team relocated after one season and rebranded as the Coburg Galaxy. They announced they would play out of the Baltimore Recreation Centre in nearby Baltimore, Ontario. The team lasted six games in Cobourg before the league terminated its membership for not having enough players.

== Season-by-season records ==
Season	GP	W	L	T	OTL	Pts	GF	GA	Regular season finish	Playoffs
2016–17	47	7	37	2	1	17	89	247	4th of 4, East; 7th of 8, CPJHL	Lost First Round, 2–12 (two-game total) vs. Almonte Jr. Sharpshooters
2017–18	6	1	5	0	0	2	18	47	Membership revoked midseason	
