= Tom McCarthy (ice hockey, born 1960) =

Canadian ice hockey player (1960–2022)

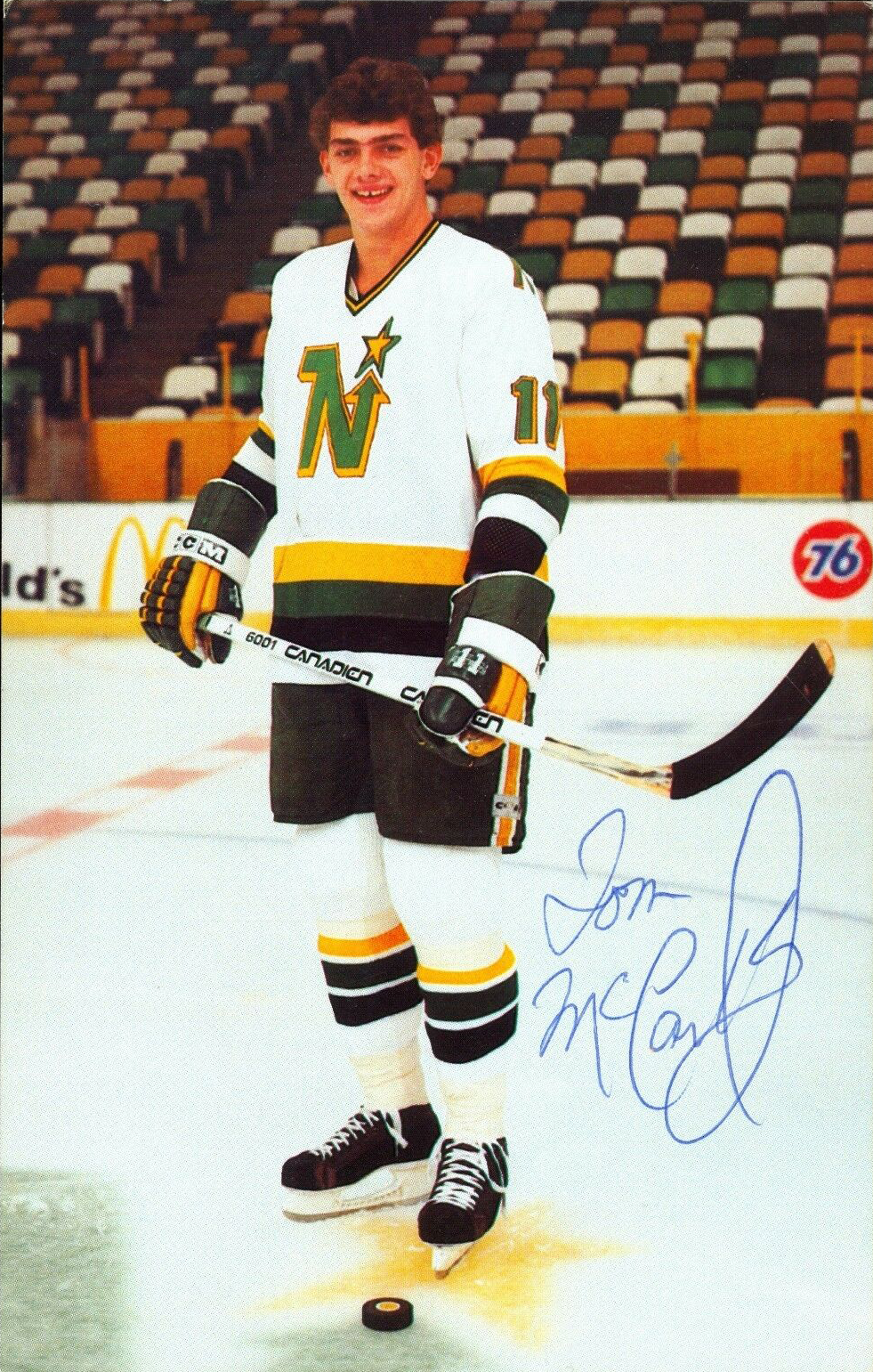
- McCarthy with the Minnesota North Stars in 1982
- Born: July 31, 1960 Toronto, Ontario, Canada
- Died: April 13, 2022 (aged 61) Chuburna, Yucatán, Mexico
- Height: 6 ft 2 in (188 cm)
- Weight: 200 lb (91 kg; 14 st 4 lb)
- Position: Forward
- Shot: Left
- Played for: HC Asiago; Minnesota North Stars; Boston Bruins
- NHL draft: 10th overall, 1979; Minnesota North Stars
- Playing career: 1979–1988

Thomas Joseph McCarthy (July 31, 1960 – April 13, 2022) was a Canadian professional ice hockey player who played nine seasons in the National Hockey League (NHL). He played for the Minnesota North Stars and Boston Bruins from 1979 to 1988. He featured in the 1981 Stanley Cup Finals with the North Stars and the 1988 Stanley Cup Finals with the Bruins.

After retiring as a player, he became a part-owner of the Espanola Express hockey team in the Northern Ontario Junior Hockey League (NOJHL).

== Early life ==
McCarthy was born in Toronto, on July 31, 1960. He was the first overall pick in the 1977 OMJHL Midget Draft, making him one of two players drafted ahead of Wayne Gretzky. Oshawa Generals general manager Sherwood Bassin chose McCarthy over Gretzky primarily because Gretzky had made it known prior to the draft he only intended to play one season in the OHL before signing with the World Hockey Association. McCarthy scored 69 goals in 63 games played for the Oshawa Generals during the 1978–79 season.

Prior to the NHL entry draft in 1979, McCarthy who was 19 at the time, and his agent Art Kaminsky threatened to sue the NHL over the minimum age of 20 to be eligible for the entry draft. The NHL moved the draft from June to August and lowered to minimum age for draft eligibility. McCarthy was drafted in the first round (tenth overall selection) of the 1979 NHL entry draft by the Minnesota North Stars.

== Playing career ==
McCarthy joined the North Stars after the draft at the age of 19 and made the team's opening day roster for the 1979–80 NHL season, playing in a 4–1 win over the Hartford Whalers on October 11, 1979. His first NHL point came in his third game against the Buffalo Sabres on October 14, 1979, and his first two NHL goals against the New York Rangers in a 7–2 win on October 27, 1979. McCarthy finished the regular season with 36 points, scoring 16 goals and logging 39 penalty minutes. The North Stars finished 3rd in the Adams Division with a record of 36–38–16 and qualified for the 1980 Stanley Cup playoffs. In the first round, the North Stars swept the Toronto Maple Leafs in three games with McCarthy scoring 5 points with 2 goals. In the second round, the North Stars defeated the Montreal Canadiens in 4 games to 3, and during the series, McCarthy had one goal and one assist. In the semi-finals, the North Stars were eliminated four games to one by the Philadelphia Flyers, with McCarthy scoring 4 points with 2 goals.

He was selected to play in the 1983 NHL All-Star Game and ended that year with 28 goals in a career-high 80 games played. During the 1983–84 season, he finished fifth in the NHL in game-winning goals (7), seventh in power play goals (16), and ninth in shooting percentage (23.6). In the summer of 1985, he checked into rehab in California for alcohol dependency. Later in the 1985–86 season, McCarthy had a number of injuries, missing the season opener with a knee injury, then later suffered injuries to his wrist, shoulder, thumb and contracted influenza.

McCarthy was later traded to the Boston Bruins on May 16, 1986 for second and third-round picks. The trade came after a series of injuries and McCarthy arriving late for practice on multiple occasions, McCarthy also did not agree to a contract extension with the North Stars and was set to become a free agent. McCarthy did agree to a new contract with the Bruins before the trade was completed. During his first season with the franchise, he recorded the fourth-highest shooting percentage (24.8). McCarthy retired as a player at the end of the 1987–88 season, finishing his career with 178 goals and 399 points. He had 12 goals and 38 points in the playoffs. At the start of the 1989–90 season, McCarthy tried out for the Vancouver Canucks, failing to make the roster.

Former North Stars general manager Lou Nanne described McCarthy as "one of the most talented" North Star players of all time. During his playing time he earned the nickname "Jughead", and often played on a line with centre Neal Broten and Hall of Fame winger Dino Ciccarelli.

== Legal issues ==
After McCarthy retired from the NHL, he resided in Minnesota. There, he became involved with drug dealer Carl Thompsen. His activities resulted in McCarthy receiving a prison sentence of five years and ten months for conspiracy to traffic a truck full of marijuana in 1994. As he was considered an illegal alien by U.S. authorities, he was sent to the U.S. Federal Leavenworth Penitentiary. He started a hockey program at Leavenworth, earning the respect of his fellow inmates and, eventually, a transfer to a prison in Canada to complete the final year of his full sentence. McCarthy credited the hockey program he began in prison for stirring his passion for coaching.

== Coaching career ==
After his release from prison, McCarthy coached junior hockey in Mississauga, Ontario, before becoming head coach of the Huntsville Otters of the OPJHL, and later the Trenton Golden Hawks of the OJHL.

McCarthy was named head coach of the North Bay Trappers Junior "A" Hockey Club of the Northern Ontario Junior Hockey League (NOJHL) on June 27, 2011. He remained there for two seasons, leading the team to a NOJHL championship in 2013. Later that same year, Tim Clayden – the Trappers' owner – founded an expansion team that same year called the Espanola Rivermen and brought McCarthy on as head coach. McCarthy stayed with the Rivermen when they left the NOJHL to join Clayden's new league, the Canadian International Hockey League, which lasted just one season before folding in 2015.

The NOJHL announced in May 2015 the establishment of another expansion team in Espanola called the Express. McCarthy joined the team as one of the owners and its head coach. In August of the following year, McCarthy announced he was taking a head coaching position with HSC Csíkszereda in the Romanian Hockey League but would continue to remain involved with the Express as one of the owners. He later resigned as Csíkszereda‘s coach in late November 2016. He subsequently returned to Espanola as the Express' head coach for the 2017–18 season.

== Personal life and death ==
After retiring from coaching, McCarthy resided in Chuburna, Yucatán, Mexico. He was married to Tina McCarthy at the time of his death.

McCarthy suffered a dissected aortic aneurysm and died in the hospital following surgery in Chuburna, Yucatán, Mexico, at the age of 61.

== Career statistics ==
			Regular season					Playoffs
Season	Team	League	GP	G	A	Pts	PIM	GP	G	A	Pts	PIM
1976–77	North York Rangers	OPJHL	43	49	47	96	12	—	—	—	—	—
1976–77	Kingston Canadiens	OMJHL	2	1	0	1	0	—	—	—	—	—
1977–78	Oshawa Generals	OMJHL	62	47	46	93	72	6	3	5	8	4
1978–79	Oshawa Generals	OMJHL	63	69	75	144	98	3	1	0	1	9
1979–80	Minnesota North Stars	NHL	68	16	20	36	39	15	5	6	11	20
1980–81	Minnesota North Stars	NHL	62	23	25	48	62	8	0	3	3	6
1981–82	Minnesota North Stars	NHL	40	12	30	42	36	4	0	2	2	4
1982–83	Minnesota North Stars	NHL	80	28	48	76	59	9	2	4	6	9
1983–84	Minnesota North Stars	NHL	66	39	31	70	49	8	1	4	5	6
1984–85	Minnesota North Stars	NHL	44	16	21	37	36	7	0	2	2	0
1985–86	Minnesota North Stars	NHL	25	12	12	24	12	—	—	—	—	—
1986–87	Boston Bruins	NHL	68	30	29	59	31	4	1	1	2	4
1986–87	Moncton Golden Flames	AHL	2	0	1	1	0	—	—	—	—	—
1987–88	Boston Bruins	NHL	7	2	5	7	6	13	3	4	7	18
1987–88	Maine Mariners	AHL	17	7	6	13	14	—	—	—	—	—
1988–89	HC Asiago	ITA	7	2	5	7	6	13	3	4	7	18
NHL totals			460	178	221	399	330	68	12	26	38	67

Preceded by Craig Hartsburg	Minnesota North Stars first-round draft pick 1979	Succeeded by Brad Palmer
