= Ottawa Sharpshooters =

- City: Almonte, Ontario
- League: Greater Metro Junior A Hockey League
- Founded: 2016
- Folded: 2019
- Home arena: Almonte & District Community Centre
- Colours: Maroon, black, and white
- General manager: Angelo Gallo
- Head coach: Charles Mills

Franchise history
- 2016–2018: Almonte Jr Sharpshooters
- 2018–2019: Ottawa Sharpshooters

The Ottawa Sharpshooters were a junior ice hockey team from Almonte, Ontario, Canada. They began play in the 2016–17 season in the Canadian Premier Junior Hockey League (CPJHL). After two seasons in the CPJHL, the Sharpshooters joined the Greater Metro Junior A Hockey League (GMHL) for 2018–19. In December 2019, the Sharpshooters folded during their second season in the GMHL.

== History ==
Originally part of the Ottawa Sharpshooters youth organization, the Jr. Sharpshooters were among the first organizations approved to play in the new United Hockey Union-sanctioned Canadian Premier Junior Hockey League. In June 2016, the Almonte Town Council passed a motion to have the new Jr. Sharpshooters team play out of the Almonte & District Community Centre for the 2016–17 season and took on the name Almonte Jr. Sharpshooters. The organization also fielded an U18 team in the National College Prospects Hockey League (NCPHL) that retained the Ottawa Sharpshooters name.

During the 2016–17 season, Almonte placed first in the East Division at the end of the regular season and earned the second overall seed for the playoffs. The made it to the inaugural championship game where they defeated the regular season champion Muskoka Wild 4–3 in overtime.

After the 2016–17 season, the Jr. Sharpshooters announced their intentions to leave the league and were removed from the CPJHL website. At the same time, the Sharpshooters' organization announced that it would be replacing its U18 team in the NCPHL with the Almonte team and launched a second team, called the Eastern Ontario Hockey Academy (EOHA) Wolves, as part of a NCPHL Canada Division. However, by September 2017, the NCPHL had several teams struggling to sign enough players and the league ceased operations. The four NCPHL teams that had enough players, including the Sharpshooters and Wolves, then joined the CPJHL for the 2017–18 season. At the start of the season, Sharpshooters and EOHA ended their affiliation with the Ottawa Valley Wolves and the EOHA teams dropped the use of the Wolves nickname.

Both the EOHA and Jr. Sharpshooters teams would end the 2017–18 regular season in fourth and fifth places, respectively, in their division, leading to an elimination playoff game between the two teams. However, it appears this game was never played and EOHA was then scheduled to face the top-seeded Smiths Falls Settlers. After splitting the first two games of the best-of-three series, the CPJHL forced EOHA to forfeit the series due to illegally using Jr. Sharpshooters' players in the series. Both teams were immediately removed from the league upon the completion of the 2018 playoffs and the league confirmed it had terminated the two teams' membership with the CPJHL on April 6.

In April 2018, the Sharpshooters announced they would be joining the Greater Metro Junior A Hockey League (GMHL) for the 2018–19 season as the Ottawa Sharpshooters.

In December 2019, the Sharpshooters forfeited their last two games before the winter break with the opposing home teams posting identical messages claiming weather and travel related issues, although it had been reported that the owner could no longer fund the team. On 3 January 2020, before the GMHL was to resume play after the winter the break, the league president announced the Sharpshooters had been folded by the owner.

== Season-by-season records ==
Season	GP	W	L	T	OTL	Pts	GF	GA	Finish	Playoffs
2016–17	45	34	8	1	2	71	206	94	1st of 4, East; 2nd of 8, CPJHL	Won First Round, 12–2 (two-game total) vs. Nemesis; 2–1–0, 2nd of 4 round-robin (OTW, 4–3 vs. Stallions; L, 1–4 vs. Wild; W, 4–2 vs. Hawks); Won Championship game, 4–3(OT) vs. Muskoka Wild; League champions
2017–18	42	9	32	—	1	19	101	262	5th of 5, East; 10th of 10, CPJHL	Forfeit Elimination game to EOHA
2018–19	32	4	26	—	2	10	88	225	10th of 10, North; 21st of 22, GMHL	Lost Qualifying game, 3–4 (OT) vs. South Muskoka Shield
2019–20	28	3	25	—	0	6	63	201	Folded midseason	
