= Muskoka Wild =

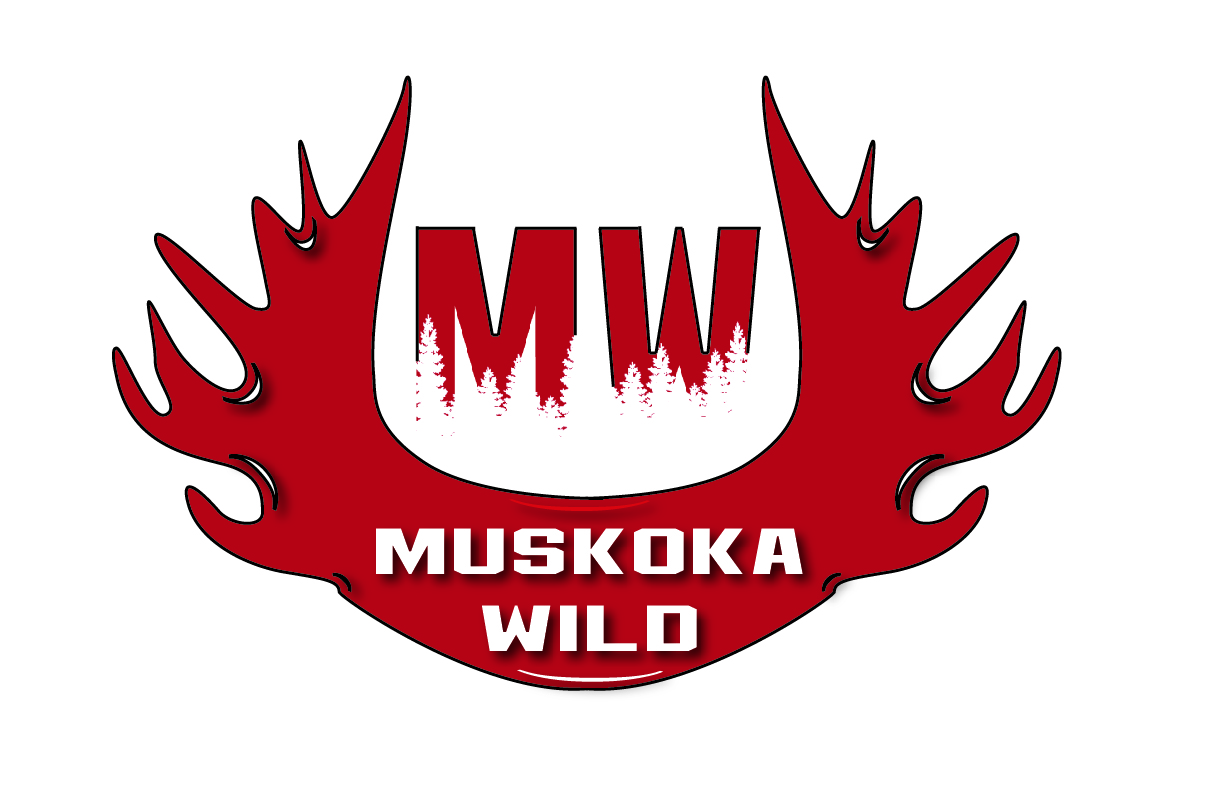
- City: Port Carling, Ontario
- League: Canadian Premier Junior Hockey League
- Division: West
- Founded: 2016
- Folded: 2017
- Home arena: Port Carling Arena
- Colours: Red, White
- General manager: Scott Baker
- Head coach: Ben Murdoch
- Website: Wild website

The Muskoka Wild were a United Hockey Union-sanctioned junior ice hockey team from Port Carling, Ontario, Canada. They were a member of the Canadian Premier Junior Hockey League and played in the 2016–17 season.

== History ==
The Muskoka Wild came to fruition when Northern Athletic Education (NAE), an athletic training company based out of Port Carling, partnered with the newly formed Canadian Premier Junior Hockey League (CPJHL) to bring junior hockey to the Muskoka region.

The Wild played their inaugural game on September 24, 2016, defeating the Seaforth Generals 6-2. They opened the season on an eight-game winning streak leading to a 9–1–0 record through the first quarter of the season. However, their first defeat came on the road against the Grey Highlands Hawks on October 24 due to the Wild having to forfeit the game after some players sustained injuries in the previous game and the Wild did not have enough players to safely compete. Even with this minor setback, the team would finish the regular season in first place in the league.

Entering the playoffs with the first overall seed, the Wild defeated the Seaforth Generals in the first round, advancing to the CPJHL Super 4. The Wild went 3–0 against the Grey Highland Hawks, Essa Stallions and Almonte Jr. Sharpshooters to secure a spot in the Championship game on March 19, 2017. Playing the Sharpshooters, the Wild fell behind 3–0 through two periods, before tying the game with just over a minute to play, forcing the game to overtime. The comeback would ultimately fall short, with the Sharpshooters defeating the Wild 4–3.

During the first week of the 2017–18 season, the CPJHL announced the Wild would not participate in the season and were removed from the schedule.

== Season-by-season records ==
| Season | GP | W | L | T | OTL | Pts | GF | GA | Regular season finish | Playoffs |
|---|---|---|---|---|---|---|---|---|---|---|
| 2016–17 | 48 | 35 | 7 | 3 | 3 | 76 | 197 | 110 | 1st of 4, West; 1st of 8, CPJHL | Won First Round, 14–5 Two-game Total (Generals); 3–0–0, 1st of 4 in Round Robin (W, 8–2 vs. Hawks; W, 4–1 vs. Stallions; W, 4–1 vs. Sharpshooters); Lost Championship game, 3–4 (OT) vs. Almonte Jr. Sharpshooters |
