= Grey Highlands Hawks =

- City: Markdale, Ontario, Canada
- League: Canadian Premier Junior Hockey League
- Division: West
- Founded: 2016
- Folded: 2019
- Home arena: Markdale Public Arena
- Colours: Red, black, and white
- Owner(s): Carrie Robertson and Cory Lafonte
- General manager: Cory Lafonte
- Head coach: Cory Lafonte

Franchise history
- 2016–2019: Grey Highlands Hawks

The Grey Highlands Hawks were a United Hockey Union-sanctioned junior ice hockey team from Markdale, Ontario, Canada. They were a member of the Canadian Premier Junior Hockey League and began play in the 2016–17 season.

== History ==
In 2016, a two-year agreement was reached between Grey Highlands and Hawks owners Carrie Robertson and Cory Lafonte. The team played their first season in 2016–17 and won the first round playoff series over the Glengarry Highlanders. They were eliminated in the round-robin, losing to all three other teams. The following season, the Brampton Royals, a 2017 expansion team, was merged into the Hawks roster a week before the start of the season.

After three seasons, the Hawks were removed from the league in the first week of the 2019–20 season.

== Season-by-season records ==
Season	GP	W	L	T	OTL	Pts	GF	GA	Regular season finish	Playoffs
2016–17	48	29	18	1	0	59	216	149	3rd of 4, West; 4th of 8, CPJHL	Won First Rround, 13–9 two-game total vs. Glengarry Highlanders; 0–2–1, 4th of 4 round-robin (L, 2–8 vs. Wild; OTL, 4–5 vs. Stallions; L, 2–4 vs. Sharpshooters)
2017–18	44	16	28	0	0	32	132	199	5th of 5, West; 7th of 10, CPJHL	Lost Elimination game, 4–5 vs. Seaforth Generals
2018–19	44	36	7	0	1	73	238	121	1st of 7, CPJHL	First Round bye Lost Semifinals, 0–2 vs. Muskoka Anglers
