= Seaforth Generals =

- City: Seaforth, Ontario, Canada
- League: Canadian Premier Junior Hockey League
- Division: West
- Founded: 2016
- Folded: 2020
- Home arena: Seaforth & District Community Centre
- Colours: Green, orange, black, and white
- General manager: T.J. Runhart
- Head coach: Norm Maracle

Franchise history
- 2016–2020: Seaforth Generals

The Seaforth Generals were a United Hockey Union-sanctioned junior ice hockey team from Seaforth, Ontario, Canada. They are a member of the Canadian Premier Junior Hockey League and began play in the 2016–17 season.

== History ==
Prior to settling on Seaforth, Generals' owner 28-year-old T.J. Runhart, also considered Monkton Ontario. There was also the possibility of placing the team in the Greater Metro Junior A Hockey League (GMHL) but operating costs were too high. On April 15, 2016, the Generals became the fourth franchise to join the Canadian Premier Junior Hockey League (CPJHL).

== Season-by-season records ==
Season	GP	W	L	T	OTL	Pts	GF	GA	Regular season finish	Playoffs
2016–17	48	3	44	1	0	7	96	298	4th of 4, West; 8th of 8, CPJHL	Lost First Round, 5–14 two-game total vs. Muskoka Wild
2017–18	44	16	26	0	2	34	138	211	4th of 5, West; 6th of 10, CPJHL	Won Elimination game, 5–4 vs. Grey Highlands Hawks; Lost First Round, 0–2 vs. Essa Stallions
2018–19	44	18	23	0	3	39	154	205	5th of 7, CPJHL	Lost First Round, 0–2 vs. Muskoka Anglers
2019–20	39	31	8	0	0	62	189	91	1st of 9, CPJHL	Won Semifinals, 2–0 vs. Severn Stallions; Championship cancelled due to COVID-19 pandemic.
