= Chapman's =

Canadian ice cream manufacturer

Chapman's Ice Cream
- Type: Private
- Industry: Manufacturing
- Founded: 1973; 53 years ago
- Headquarters: Markdale, Ontario, Canada; 100 Chapman's Crescent; N0C 1H0
- Area served: Canada
- Key people: Penny Chapman and David Chapman (founders)
- Products: Ice cream Frozen yogurt
- Website: chapmans.ca

Chapman's is a Canadian manufacturer of ice cream. It is the largest independent ice cream and ice water manufacturer in Canada. Chapman's produces products under the company brand name, as well as store brand products. They are also known for their range of ice creams for people with special dietary needs. Chapman's products are distributed nationally.

The company was founded by David and Penny Chapman in 1973. Their son, Ashley, currently runs the business.

== History ==
In 1973, David and Penny Chapman purchased the Creamery in Markdale, Ontario, a village just south of Georgian Bay. The company started out as a small creamery with four employees and two trucks.

In 2001, a distribution centre was opened in New Brunswick to better serve Chapman's Atlantic Canada.

On September 4, 2009, a major fire gutted the Chapman's creamery. No employees were hurt in the blaze. Chapman's had been using a smaller plant since the fire.

On September 4, 2010, they opened their new facility on the anniversary of the destruction of the old plant. The smaller plant was converted into a nut facility, while the addition of the new plant became a nut-free facility (the larger of the two plants is about quadruple the size of the old one), allowing the hiring of 50 to 100 new employees.

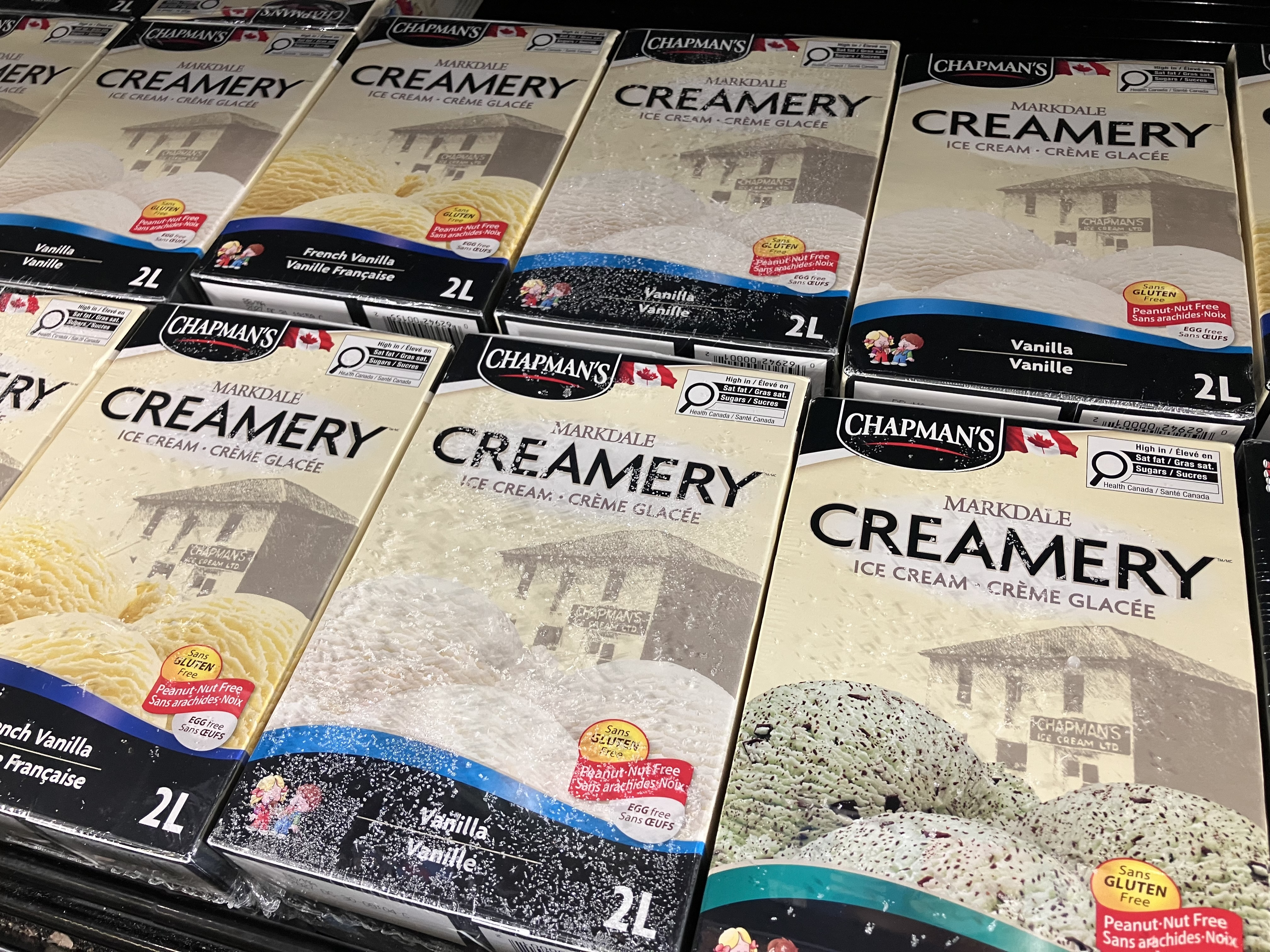
A selection of Chapman's ice cream at a grocery store. Note the boxed ice cream is from Chapman's Markdale plants

During the COVID-19 pandemic, when the Pfizer and Moderna vaccines were being readied for distribution, which require strong refrigeration for storage, Chapman's volunteered the use of their industrial freezers for the Grey Bruce Health Unit for the vials. When the company decided upon a vaccine mandate where any unvaccinated employees must submit to a company paid COVID-19 rapid antigen test twice a week, while their vaccinated employees would get a $1 raise as the equivalent compensation for the cost of the tests, the company was subject to calls for a boycott by anti-vaccination groups. However, there was also a wave of public support around Canada for the business in reaction to this hostility, although it was not clear how the activism of either side was affecting sales. Company vice-president Ashley Chapman said on CBC Radio's As It Happens that the boycott had no effect on the company's bottom line.

After U.S. president Donald Trump announced 25 percent tariffs on all goods imported from Canada, Chapman's announced they would source ingredients that previously came from the United States from other countries, such as Italy. In addition, they began absorbing all immediate increases to the costs of the tariffs.

== Facilities ==
Production is centered in Markdale, with two plants located in the town; the 65,000 square feet (6,000 m^{2}) smaller plant is a nut facility, while the larger 150,000 square feet (14,000 m^{2}) plant is nut-free. The company also operates a 140,000 sq ft (13,000 m^{2}) distribution centre south of town on Highway 10. There is another distribution centre in Hampton, New Brunswick to serve the Atlantic provinces. Chapman's owns a wastewater treatment plant to purify 675,000 litres (178,000 US gal) of wastewater daily produced from the cleaning and production processes.
