= Markdale =

- Unincorporated community
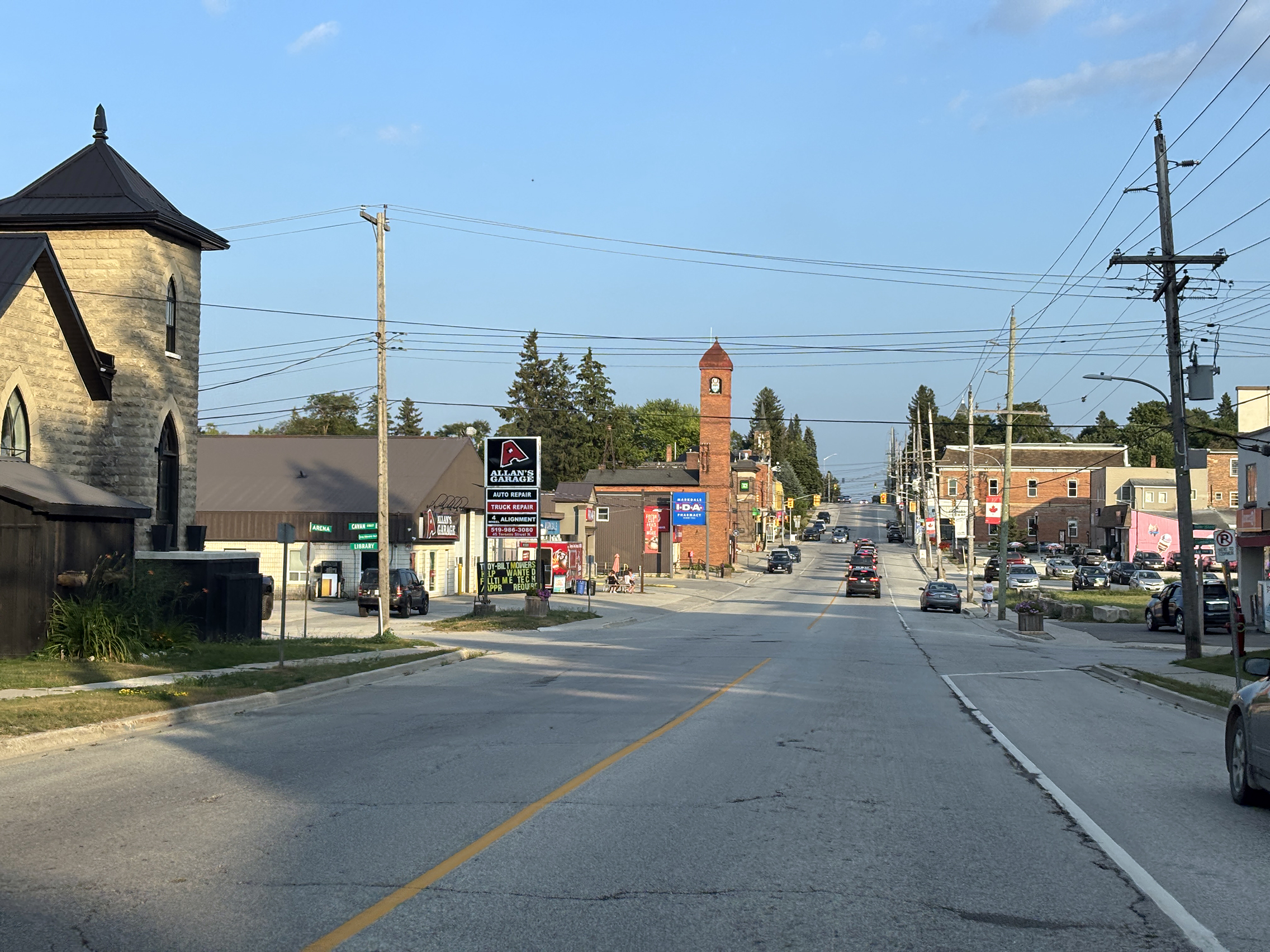
- Downtown area in Markdale (2025)

- Location within Southern Ontario
- Coordinates: 44°19′N 80°39′W
- Country: Canada
- Province: Ontario
- County: Grey
- Municipality: Grey Highlands
- Settled: 1846
- Incorporated: 1888
- Dissolved (amalgamated): January 1, 2001

Area
  - Land: 2.30 km^{2} (0.89 sq mi)

Population (2021)
  - Total: 1,206
  - Density: 524.8/km^{2} (1,359/sq mi)
- Time zone: UTC−5 (EST)
  - Summer (DST): UTC−4 (EDT)
- Postal code FSA: N0C
- Area codes: 519, 226, 548
- Highways: Highway 10

Markdale is a community in the Municipality of Grey Highlands, in Grey County, Ontario, Canada.

== History ==
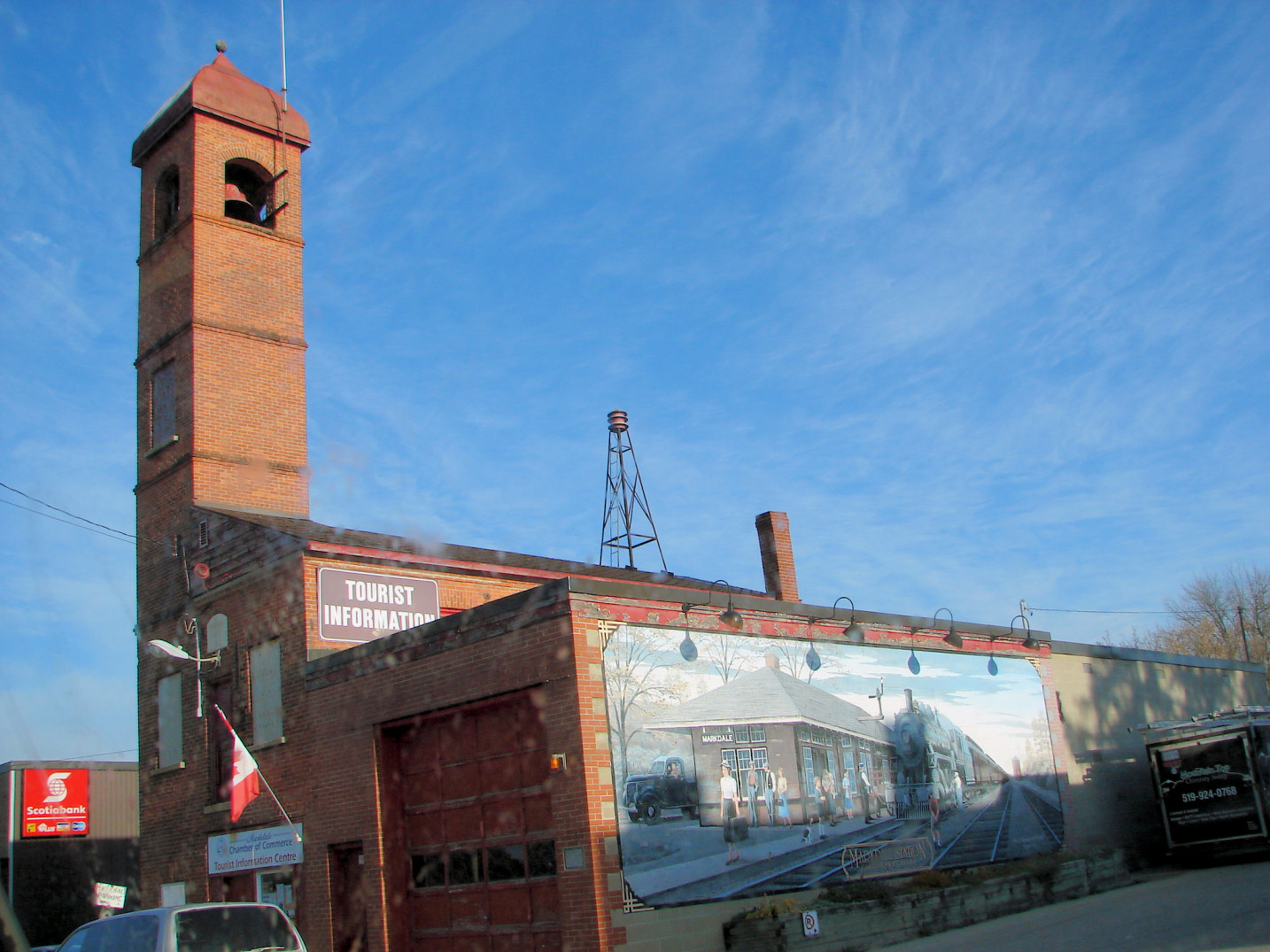
Historic fire station in Markdale

Markdale was first settled in 1846 and originally called East Glenelg, after a nearby township. In 1864, it was renamed Cornabus after the Scottish hometown, Islay, of the postmaster, Donald MacDuffie (1814–1892). The post office was established in 1869.

In the 1870s, new railways were a vital economic engine for small Ontario towns, as evidenced by nearby Flesherton, which had failed to prosper after the Toronto, Grey and Bruce Railway decided to bypass it. In 1873, the same railway wanted to make Cornabus a stop on its route from Toronto to Owen Sound if it could find land on which to build a station. A local landowner, Mark Armstrong, sold a parcel of land to the railway on the condition if the new station bore his name. Accordingly, the hamlet of Cornabus became Markdale and saw an immediate increase in business when the railway station opened. Fifteen years later, Markdale was incorporated as a village in 1888.

The local newspaper, The Markdale Standard, was first published in 1880 and continued until 2012.

In 1957, the Regal Films production of the 1958 B film, Wolf Dog, starring Allison Hayes and Jim Davis, was filmed on location in Markdale as well as nearby Holland Township.

In 2001, Markdale was amalgamated with the Townships of Artemesia, Euphrasia, and Osprey to form Grey Highlands.

On August 20, 2009, an F2 tornado originated in Durham, 20 km southwest of Markdale, with one fatality. It continued on to Markdale and caused F0 damage locally.

== Demographics ==
The population was 1,216 in 2016, an increase of 3.5% from 1,175 in 2011. In 2016, the average age of the population was approximately 43 years old.

Historical census populations – Markdale (Village 1888–2000; Population Centre 2001–present)

Year	Pop.	±%
1891	756	—
1901	892	+18.0%
1911	925	+3.7%
1921	882	−4.6%
1931	892	+1.1%
1941	870	−2.5%
1951	1,007	+15.7%

Year	Pop.	±%
1956	986	−2.1%
1961	1,090	+10.5%
1966	1,113	+2.1%
1971	1,236	+11.1%
1976	1,361	+10.1%
1981	1,289	−5.3%
1986	1,226	−4.9%

Year	Pop.	±%
1991	1,370	+11.7%
1996	1,354	−1.2%
2001	1,433	+5.8%
2006	1,409	−1.7%
2011	1,325	−6.0%
2016	1,216	−8.2%
2021	1,206	−0.8%

Population counts are not adjusted for boundary changes.
Source: Statistics Canada

== Amenities ==
Markdale is home to several industries including Chapman's Ice Cream and Medike Leather Products. Public services include an Ontario Provincial Police detachment, a fire department, 80-bed Bright Shores Health System Hospital, a public library, an arena and community centre, and a curling and golf club.

== Events ==
There are several annual festivities, including the Rotary Club's Street Frolic in July, and the Agricultural Society's Markdale Fall Fair in late August.

== Sports ==
The village was a charter member of the Central Ontario Hockey League and participated at the senior and junior levels under several nicknames, including Markdale Majors. For two seasons, the Grey Highlands Bravehearts of the Greater Metro Junior A Hockey League played out of the Centre Grey Recreation Complex. The Grey Highlands Hawks are an original member of the Canadian Premier Junior Hockey League that played out of the Centre Grey Recreation Complex.

== Notable people ==
- William Mulock, lawyer, businessman, educator, farmer, politician, judge, and philanthropist
- Chris Neil, Enforcer for the Ottawa Senators
- Thomas Simpson Sproule, builder; Member of Parliament; Speaker of the House of Commons; member of the Senate
- Brad Tiley, professional ice hockey player
- Harris Turner, soldier, journalist and politician
