= The Markdale Standard =

Newspaper

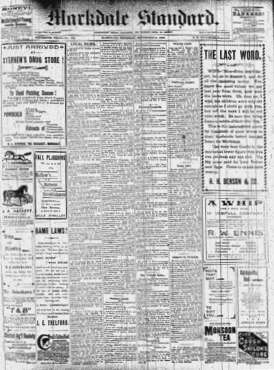
- The front page of the Markdale Standard
- Type: Daily newspaper
- Format: Broadsheet
- Founder: Charles Wesley Rutledge
- Launched: 1880; 146 years ago
- Ceased publication: 2012; 14 years ago
- Headquarters: Markdale Ontario
- Circulation: 1300

The Markdale Standard was a newspaper in Markdale, Ontario, in Grey County Canada from 1880 until 2012. The paper was continuously published for 132 years with a circulation of 1,300. The paper was known for its longevity and outlasting its peers, in 1880 there were 16 local newspapers in Grey County, but by 1920 only one remained, The Markdale Standard.

== History ==
=== The Markdale Expositor ===
The newspaper began operating under the name of the Markdale Expositor. The paper was started on October 29, 1875 under editor George Jackson Blyth. Born in 1845, Blyth would publish the Expositor until 1880, and five years started up the Chatsworth News on March 12, 1885. He was a member of the International organization of Good Templars, as a District Lecturer regarding the Temperance movement. Blyth died on January 19, 1908, having suffered a stroke June of the previous year, and buried in St. Paul's Anglican cemetery. His daughter Edith would continue to manage the paper.

=== The Markdale Standard ===
==== Rutledge years ====
On September 17, 1880 the first issue of newly renamed Markdale Standard began under Charles Wesley Rutledge, who had purchased it from Blyth. In 1899 Rutledge moved the presses from the Hill Block on Toronto Street to the Standard Block he had constructed at Main St. West & Eliza Street. On January 16, 1908, the Standard Printing Company of Markdale, under the control of J.W. Tucker, joined Rutledge in ownership. Tucker had been with the staff for nine years as a printer, five of those as foreman. The partnership between Rutledge and Tucker dissolved in 1914. Rutledge himself championed updating the library in Markdale, as Secretary-Treasurer of the Library Board when the new location was opened in 1915, relocated from the cramped confines of the local Mechanic's Institute. After retiring from the paper, Rutledge purchased Knarsboro Hall on Main Street E. from Senator Thomas Sproule, from which Rutledge's wife leased a portion of for a hospital in 1929 and to the Canadian Legion in 1946.

==== Colgan family years ====
Albert Edward Colgan took over as editor and publisher from Rutledge in January 1921. A. E., son of pioneers of Proton Township John & Sarah, was born in Dundalk in 1877. Colgan stood in provincial elections as a Conservative, winning once, and President of the South Grey Conservative Association As a young man, "Ed" Colgan served as Magistrate for both Dundalk and Markdale, A member of Odd Fellows, Orange, and Masonic organizations and leader of the local Citizen's Band, Colgan also served as chairman of the Markdale Cemetery Board. Colgan also had a partner named MacIntyre in a partnership that lasted until 1926, the next year Colgan expanding into publishing the Chatsworth Banner. Colgan became the sole owner of the Markdale Standard until his retirement and then passing in January 1945. Colgan's son Jack then became the publisher/editor. W. Jack Colgan stayed in his position until 1946, when he left for tuberculosis treatment. The paper was then run by a female family member with the help of two printers. After treatment, Jack returned and stayed with the paper until April 1949.

The paper was published from offices located at 13 Toronto Street North. Circulation for the Standard is estimated at 1,300. On occasion of its 25th anniversary the Standard was recognized in The Globe's "The Spirit of the Press" column where it was noted that: "To the uninitiated, it may appear a soft snap to run a newspaper, but there is perhaps no business which requires closer application and more methodical attention to matters of detail than that of publishing a rural newspaper."

In the late-19th century, the paper published a dedicated half column to reporting railroad accidents and delays, which were then a constant feature of rural existence.

After the 1935 federal election of Agnes MacPhail to the newly formed riding of Grey-Bruce, she kept her constituents appraised through a Weekly Letter From Ottawa in 1936-1937 issues.

=== 20th century ===
The Colgan family ownership ended in April 1949, when the paper was purchased by R. Gordon Craig of Ingersoll. Craig had been the editor of the Ingersoll Tribune previously. Craig published the paper until 1968 when William Kennedy, editor and publisher of the Durham Chronicle, bought the paper. In 1971 Kennedy was joined by former Hanover Post photographer Melvin John Gateman, who served as editor until 1998. Adam Freill took over from Mel, serving as the editor and general manager until 2000. John McPhee was the editor until 2001. In 2001 Lori Ledingham began her tenure as editor for the Standard until its closure in 2012. At the time, publisher Cheryl McMenemy explained the decision to end publication was strictly a business decision telling the Owen Sound Sun Times that: "There is no longer an advertising base within the Markdale area to sustain a community newspaper."

== Cookbook ==
In the late 1920s, The Markdale Standard published a cookbook. The author said that "proper diet" was essential, and called diabetes a "money-making disease," proffering the counsel that insulin is not a cure, but keeps the disease in a "stagnant position". He also counseled that aluminium pots should never be used for cooking.

== See also ==
- List of newspapers in Canada
