= Severn Stallions =

- City: Severn, Ontario, Canada
- League: Canadian Premier Junior Hockey League
- Division: West
- Founded: 2016
- Folded: 2020
- Home arena: Coldwater Community Centre
- Colours: Green, black, and white
- Head coach: Sylvain Cloutier

Franchise history
- 2016–2019: Essa Stallions
- 2019–2020: Severn Stallions

The Severn Stallions were a United Hockey Union-sanctioned junior ice hockey team from Severn, Ontario, Canada. They are a member of the Canadian Premier Junior Hockey League and began play in the 2016–17 season. For the team's first three seasons, it was known as the Essa Stallions in Essa, Ontario.

== History ==
On May 4, 2016, proposals were made to Essa Township Council where it was agreed the Essa Stallions would be allowed to play in the fall of 2016 in the Angus Recreation Centre. Their first head coach would be Sylvain Cloutier, a 20-year hockey journeyman who has played in North America and England. Cloutier has coached several teams including the Corpus Christi IceRays (CHL) in 2008–09. The Stallions qualified for 2017 playoffs after their inaugural season. The first round consisted of a two-game series with an aggregate total score to move on. Their opponent, the O-Town Rebels, forfeited the second game and the Stallions played in the four team round-robin where they were eliminated.

The Essa Stallions then won the league championship in 2018 and 2019. After three seasons in Angus, the team relocated to the Coldwater Community Centre in Severn, Ontario, and was renamed the Severn Stallions.

== Season-by-season records ==
Season	GP	W	L	T	OTL	Pts	GF	GA	Regular Season Finish	Playoffs
2016–17	48	29	13	1	5	64	204	138	2nd of 4, West; 3rd of 8, CPJHL	Won First Round, 7–3 two-game total (Note: Only played one game, Rebels forfeited the second) vs. O-Town Rebels; 1–1–1, 3rd of 4 round-robin (L, 1–4 vs. Wild; OTL, 3–4 vs. Sharpshooters; OTW, 5–4 vs. Hawks)
2017–18	44	42	2	—	0	84	241	63	1st of 5, West; 1st of 10, CPJHL	Won First Round, 2–0 vs. Seaforth Generals; Won Second Round, 2–1 vs. Bracebridge Pioneers; Won Championships, 2–0 vs. Smiths Falls Settlers; CPJHL Champions
2018–19	44	36	7	—	1	73	256	98	2nd of 7, CPJHL	Won First Round, 2–0 vs. Smiths Falls Settlers; Won Semifinals, 2–0 vs. Maniwaki Mustangs; Won Championships, 2–0 vs. Muskoka Anglers; CPJHL Champions
2019–20	42	28	12	—	2	58	201	136	3rd of 9, CPJHL	Won First Round, 2–0 vs. Langton Royals; Lost Semifinals, 0–2 vs. Seaforth Generals

== Roster (2020-2021) ==
Goaltenders:

- David Barrett - Parker Simpson

Defence:

- Jeremy Fortin - Brendan Jang - Gage Polhill - Thomas Zwiers

Forwards:

- Dylan Beattie - Caleb Boylan - Christopher Champaigne - Colton Cunnington - Owen Gouin - Jake Grinnell - Theron Iron-Opikokew - Seth Keltamaki - Carson Latimer - Colton Latimer - Kevin Logan - Steven Van Hoorelbeke
