= World United Hockey League =

Defunct Canadian ice hockey league

- Sport: Ice hockey
- Founded: 2014
- Folded: 2015
- No. of teams: 4
- Country: Canada
- Last champion: St. Charles North Stars (2014–15)
- Website: WUHL Website

The World United Hockey League (WUHL) was a junior ice hockey league. The WUHL were members of the United Hockey Union (UHU), an affiliate of the Amateur Athletic Union (AAU).

== History ==
Formed in November 2014, the WUHL was formed by four teams who were previously members of the Canadian International Hockey League (CIHL). On November 10, 2014 the CIHL decided to leave the UHU and became an independent league. The four teams decided to separate and stay under the UHU umbrella, forming the new league.

On November 15, 2014, the Milton Battle Arts Cobras won the first-ever WUHL game, 7-4 against Toronto Junior Hockey Academy. Defensemen Brody Heleno of Missassauga, Ontario scored the historic opening goal just 42-seconds into the game. Heleno recently committed to play college hockey at Salem State University in the Fall of 2015.

After playing nine league games, Collingwood Ice owner Tim Dickieson folded the team. The Ice won five of eight games, but Dickieson alleged a lack of local support ended the team.

All four teams competed in the 2015 WUHL Playoffs. Regular season winner St. Charles easily swept their best-of-three semifinals series over Colborne (9-3, 12-2) while Milton had a much tougher series win over Toronto Hockey Academy (6-5, 1-0). The league finals were a best-of-five series with the North Stars defeating Milton in three straight games (5-2, 8-5, 5-1).

Two expansion teams were announced in July 2015: Acton Rhinos and Mississauga Red Dogs. However, by early September, the Red Dogs had removed their website and appears to have folded sometime after holding a training camp on August 26, 2015, due to lack of league transparency. On September 14, 2015, the WUHL announced another expansion team called the Lake of Bays Snappers based out of Lake of Bays, Ontario. However, since the announcement stating the Snappers would take the ice in October 2015, there had been no updates on any teams or league news by the end of October and the league has appeared to have ceased operations.

== Teams ==
Team	Arena	City/area
Acton Rhinos	Acton Arena	Acton, Ontario
Lake of Bays Snappers	Baysville Arena	Lake of Bays, Ontario
St. Charles North Stars	St. Charles Arena	St. Charles, Ontario
Toronto Junior Hockey Academy	MasterCard Centre	Toronto, Ontario

=== Former teams ===
- Colborne Cramahe Hawks (2014–15)
- Collingwood Ice (2014–15)
- Milton Battle Arts Cobras (2014–15)
- Mississauga Red Dogs (Announced for 2015–16 but appears to have ceased operations in September 2015)

== League champions ==
Season	Regular Season Champion	Playoff Champion	Runner-up
2014–15	St. Charles North Stars	St. Charles North Stars	Milton Cobras

== 2015 Playoffs ==
Semifinals
1	St. Charles North Stars	2
4	Colborne Cramahe Hawks	0
2	Milton Cobras	2
3	Toronto Hockey Academy	0

WUHL Finals
1	St. Charles North Stars	3
2	Milton Cobras	0
