= Canadian International Hockey League =

Canadian junior ice hockey league

- Current season or competition: 2014–15 CIHL season
- Region(s): Northeastern Ontario and Michigan
- President: Tim Clayden
- Vice-President: Dean Pauli
- Founded: 2014
- Recent champions: Batchewana Attack (2014-15)
- Headquarters: Thornhill, Ontario
- Website: CIHL website

The Canadian International Hockey League (CIHL) was a Canadian independent Junior ice hockey league based in Northern Ontario, Central Ontario, and the Greater Toronto Area.

== History ==
The CIHL was officially announced on April 8, 2014 with the unveiling of its website. The league was started by Tim Clayden, owner of the Espanola Rivermen, a team that just finished their first year in the Northern Ontario Junior Hockey League and then left.

In May 2014, the league was accepted into the Amateur Athletic Union's United Hockey Union. The AAU provides insurance and oversight to its leagues, but is not a recognized governing body of ice hockey by Hockey Canada or the International Ice Hockey Federation.

The league initially announced two other confirmed teams: the Bracebridge Phantoms and the Colborne Cramahe Hawks (formerly Bobcaygeon Bucks) from the Greater Metro Junior A Hockey League. A week after announcing Bracebridge as a team, the team decided to stay with the GMHL under new ownership.

The league then announced the following teams for its inaugural season: Barrie Stars, Batchewana Attack, Collingwood Ice, Greater Sudbury Royals, Milton Cobras and St. Charles Spirit. In early August it was announced that Barrie would not continue with the league.

On August 27, the CIHL officially announced the Toronto Junior Hockey Academy as a league member.

On October 4, 2014, the CIHL kicked off its inaugural hockey weekend. The first-ever puck drop took place in St. Charles, Ontario where the St. Charles Spirit hosted the Greater Sudbury Royals. The Spirit would win the first-ever CIHL game 5-3. That same day in Sault Ste. Marie, Ontario, the Batchewana Attack hosted the Espanola Rivermen, winning 6-2.

On November 10, 2014, the CIHL left the United Hockey Union and the AAU. In addition, the CIHL allowed its first American team into the league, the Kalkaska Rhinos. Within a week, the CIHL experienced an exodus of teams, seeing Colborne, Collingwood, Milton and Toronto leaving the league to form their own AAU-sanctioned World United Hockey League (WUHL). The St. Charles Spirit folded days later. The Collingwood Ice would also fold after playing nine games in the WUHL.

In late November, the CIHL announced the formation of the Markstay-Warren Spirit Warriors, a new team who would assume the St. Charles' schedule and win-loss record. After playing one game (losing 6-0), the Markstay-Warren Spirit Warriors joined the ever-growing list of former teams when they folded in order to send players to the Greater Sudbury Royals. This provided a boost to the winless Royals, who were also on the verge of folding. The Royals would fold in later January. In February, the Kalkaska Rhinos left the CIHL to become an independent team, leaving only the Espanola Riverman and the Batchewana Attack, putting the league's future in question.

In April 2015, the league decided against operating for a 2nd season.

== Teams ==
Team	City	Arena
Batchewana Attack	Sault Ste. Marie, Ontario	Rankin Arena
Espanola Rivermen	Espanola, Ontario	Espanola Regional Recreational Complex

== Regular season champions ==
Season	Champion	W-L-T-OTL	Pts
2014–15	Batchewana Attack	35-0-0-1	71

== Playoff champions ==
Season	Champion	Finalist	Series
2014–15	Batchewana Attack	Espanola Rivermen	4-0

== Former teams ==
Team	City	Joined	Folded	Status
Barrie Area Stars	Lefroy	Never played
Bracebridge Phantoms	Bracebridge	Never played
Colborne Cramahe Hawks	Colborne	2014	2014	Joined WUHL
Collingwood Ice	Collingwood	2014	2014	Joined WUHL
Greater Sudbury Royals	Capreol	2014	2015	Folded
Kalkaska Rhinos	Kalkaska, MI	2014	2015	Pulled Out, Independent
Milton Cobras	Milton	2014	2014	Joined WUHL
St. Charles Spirit	St. Charles	2014	2014	Folded
Markstay-Warren Spirit Warriors	Markstay-Warren	2014	2014	Folded
Toronto Junior Hockey Academy	Toronto	2014	2014	Joined WUHL
