= National College Prospects Hockey League =

Junior Ice Hockey League in Northest United States and Ontario

- Director of Operations: Bob Black
- Deputy Commissioner: Peter Preteroti
- Founded: 2016
- Folded: 2017
- Recent Champions: Rochester Rebels (2017)
- Headquarters: Pittsburgh, Pennsylvania
- Website: NCPHL

The National College Prospects Hockey League was a junior ice hockey league based in Northeast United States and Ontario. During its first season, the NCPHL was sanctioned as a Tier III league by the United Hockey Union, the junior hockey branch of the Amateur Athletic Union.

== History ==
The NCPHL was announced in the spring of 2016. Originally announced as an eight-team league, as many as twelve different teams were announced for the 2016–17 season with several team changes before making it to opening night. Some teams also announced an affiliation with teams from the Western States Hockey League. By the start of the inaugural season, the league had six active teams.

One of the original eight teams, the Lake Erie Warriors, garnered media attention when the logo was largely criticized for its depiction of a Native American warrior and was called racially insensitive. The team quickly rebranded as the Lake Erie Gulls for one day and then again to the Lake Erie Eagles on July 30, 2016.

The Toronto Stealth defeated the Lake Erie Eagles 7–5 in the first league game on October 6, 2016. On February 18, 2017, the NCPHL hosted its first All-star competition and game. In the end, Team White won by a score of 7–4 with the MVP, Curtis Anderson of the Toronto Stealth, recording 3 goals and 2 assists. Despite dominating the regular season with a record of 28–2–0, the Stealth chose not to participate in the NCPHL's playoffs, called the "Frosty Four," in Erie, Pennsylvania. Four teams participated in the playoffs with the Mississauga Bruins also sitting out after not playing a league game since January. With the Rochester Rebels the only remaining team with a winning record (20–15–5), they earned an automatic berth to the championship game. The bottom two teams then played a two-game aggregate qualifier series with the winner facing the Lake Erie Eagles in a semifinal game.

After its first season, the NCPHL was removed as a junior program by the United Hockey Union and then listed itself as a junior-aged academic league. In the 2017 offseason, the league announced several new teams including an NCP Canada division led by the Almonte Jr. Sharpshooters organization. However, after many of the teams folded after failing to sign enough players, the league website and all social media was shut down in September 2017. Four of the NCPHL teams joined the Canadian Premier Junior Hockey League: the Almonte Jr. Sharpshooters, EOHA Wolves, Lake Erie Eagles, and the Maniwaki Mustangs.

== Teams ==
=== Teams at the time of folding ===
Division	Team	City	Arena	Joined
Canada
Canada	Almonte Jr. Sharpshooters	Almonte, Ontario	Almonte & District Community Centre	2017
Canada	Chelsea Hurricanes	Chelsea, Quebec	Meredith Centre	2017
Canada	Eastern Ontario Hockey Academy (EOHA) Wolves	Ottawa, Ontario		2017
Canada	Maniwaki Mustangs	Maniwaki, Quebec	Gino Odjick Center	2017
Canada	Toronto Stealth	Burlington, Ontario	Wave Twin Rinks	2016
USA
USA	Lake Erie Eagles	Erie, Pennsylvania	Erie Insurance Arena	2016

=== Former teams ===
- Adirondack Jr. Thunder (Glens Falls, New York) – Announced as an expansion team for the 2017–18 season, folded on July 30, 2017.
- Belmont Bruins (Kittanning, Pennsylvania) – Announced as an expansion team for the 2017–18 season, removed from website on August 1, 2017.
- Buffalo Hornets (Buffalo, New York) – One of the first eight announced teams for 2016–17; folded in July 2016 and immediately replaced by the New York Sharks.
- House O' Hockey Mallers (Kittanning, Pennsylvania) – One of the first eight announced teams for 2016–17; rebranded as the Blyth Pittsburgh Yellow Jackets on August 29, 2016, but folded just prior to the first week of the season.
- Lockport Lightning (Lockport, New York) – Announced as an expansion team for the 2017–18 season, folded in September 2017.
- Mississauga Bruins (Rexdale, Ontario) – Competed during the beginning of the 2016–17 season until mid-January; did not participate in playoffs despite having a winning record.
- NBH Fighting Spirit (Syracuse, New York) – Announced as an expansion team for the 2017–18 season, folded in July 2017.
- New York Sharks (Niagara Falls, New York) – Replaced the Buffalo Hornets for 2016–17; folded in September 2016 and immediately replaced on the NCPHL website by the Mississauga Bruins organization.
- Niagara Red Cats (Lockport, New York) – One of the first eight announced teams for 2016–17 but were removed from the schedule one week into the season; folded.
- Ottawa Sharpshooters U-18 (Almonte, Ontario) – Played the inaugural 2016–17 season; the Sharpshooters' organization added their U-20 team, the Almonte Jr. Sharpshooters, to the league for the 2017–18 season and added another junior-aged team called the Eastern Ontario Hockey Academy Wolves.
- Pittsburgh Kings (Connellsville, Pennsylvania) – Played the inaugural 2016–17 season; left the league prior to the 2017–18 season.
- Pittsburgh Royal Knights (Bakerstown, Pennsylvania) – One of the first eight announced teams for 2016–17; folded in July 2016 and immediately replaced on the NCPHL website by the Ottawa Sharpshooters U-18 team.
- Rochester Rebels (Rochester, New York) – One of the first eight announced teams for 2016–17; won the first NCPHL playoff championship; deleted from website in April 2017.

== Champions ==
Season	Season Champions	Playoff Champions
2016–17	Toronto Stealth	Rochester Rebels (Note: The Toronto Stealth and Mississauga Bruins did not participate in the 2017 "Frosty Four" playoffs)
