= Canadian Premier Junior Hockey League =

Canada-based junior ice hockey league

- Region: Ontario
- Commissioner: Bryan Elliott
- Founded: 2016
- Folded: 2020
- No. of teams: 4
- Recent champions: Essa Stallions (2018–19)
- Headquarters: Port Colborne, Ontario
- Website: CPJHL.com

The Canadian Premier Junior Hockey League (CPJHL) was a Canadian-based junior ice hockey league based in Ontario. The CPJHL was sanctioned by the United Hockey Union, the junior hockey branch of the Amateur Athletic Union.

== History ==
The CPJHL was announced in the spring of 2016. Originally, eleven teams were divided into two divisions and scheduled to begin play in September. The league planned to feature a 48-game schedule concluding in March and include an all-star game, college showcase event, and a league playoff.

The league gained sanctioning by the United Hockey Union (UHU) in June 2016. Before the league's first season would start, several of the announced teams had some further organizational changes. Burk's Falls was initially introduced as the Warriors, but an ownership change saw the team renamed the Bruins. The Almonte Jr. Sharpshooters were initially announced as the Ottawa Sharpshooters before making Almonte Community Center the home for the junior club. The Sharpshooters also included a U-18 team that compete in the National College Prospects Hockey League, another UHU league.

On September 16, the day the first games were set to take place, the league announced that the Akwesasne Chiefs and Coldwater Falcons would not play in the first season due to lack of players on each team. After delaying the Burk's Falls Bruins first game by two weeks, the Bruins still struggled to roster enough players and the club delayed their entry to the league. The Muskoka Wild finished the regular season as champions before losing the playoff championship game to the Jr. Sharpshooters.

After the inaugural season, the league removed the Almonte Jr. Sharpshooters and O-Town Rebels. Soon after, the league began announcing further changes with expansion teams the Bracebridge Pioneers, Brampton Royals, Coldwater Ice Wolves, Creemore Barley Kings, and the Madawaska Valley Falcons. The Glengarry Highlanders and Norwood Nemesis also relocated and became the Smiths Falls Settlers and the Cobourg Galaxy, respectively. The Barley Kings and Brampton Royals were removed later in the offseason. In September 2017, the league added the four remaining teams from the recently folded National College Prospects Hockey League: the Almonte Jr. Sharpshooters, Eastern Ontario Hockey Academy (EOHA), Lake Erie Eagles, and Maniwaki Mustangs. The Lake Erie Eagles had every scheduled game cancelled for the first seven weeks, citing prohibitive costs of international insurance, before playing their first CPJHL game on October 21. The Cobourg Galaxy, Muskoka Wild, and Madawaska Valley Falcons also folded early in the season.

During the 2018 playoffs, the Jr. Sharpshooters and EOHA, both owned by Angelo Gallo, were scheduled to face each other in an elimination game, which was then forfeited by the lower seeded Jr. Sharpshooters. EOHA then faced the Smiths Falls Settlers, splitting the series after two games in a best-of-three series. However, after the second game, the league cancelled the series in favor of the Settlers when it was found that EOHA had been using players from the Jr. Sharpshooters in the playoffs. The Essa Stallions defeated the Settlers in the championship. Both the Jr. Sharpshooters and EOHA were immediately removed from the league upon the end of the season.

For the 2018–19 season, the league announced additions of the Brampton Royals, Muskoka Anglers, Niagara-on-the-Lake Nationals, Universel College Unik, and Wexford Raiders. The Lake Erie Eagles left the league after one season citing insurance and travel costs. The Nationals left for the Greater Metro Junior A Hockey League, joining the Jr. Sharpshooters, instead of the joining the CPJHL. The league then announced the addition of the Shawville Express. Universel College Unik was removed from the league website prior to the release of the 2018–19 schedule, the Bracebridge Pioneers were removed after the schedule was released, while Shawville postponed their start and then announced they would join the next season. During the season, the Brampton Royals' franchise was revoked by the league and given to an organization called the Greater Toronto Jaguars under new ownership. The Jaguars were also removed from the schedule in December 2018.

Following the 2018–19 season, the ownership of the league was transferred from founder Stephane Laveault to Smiths Falls Settlers' general manager Barry DeGray. The expansion teams for the 2019–20 season was announced as the Langton Royals, Le Bécard de Senneterre, and Les Buffalos de Ferme-Neuve. In the first week of the season, the Grey Highlands Hawks were removed from the league and the Essa Stallions relocated to Coldwater as the Severn Stallions. On February 15, 2020, the league banned team owner Brian Fish for life for repeatedly not upholding the contract obligations to his players and terminated both his teams, the Muskoka Anglers and Scarborough Wexford Raiders, midseason. Prior to playing for the league playoff championship between the Seaforth Generals and Le Bécard de Senneterre, the series was cancelled due to the onset of the COVID-19 pandemic on March 12, 2020.

Due to the ongoing restrictions during the pandemic, the league did not play a 2020–21 season with only a few teams playing a couple of exhibition games in late 2020. In a July 2021 league update, CPJHL president Barry DeGray stated the league would focus on reduced travel with teams only located in Eastern Ontario and Western Quebec. The league announced a new team called Montreal-Est Oilers, but the announcement was removed a couple of weeks later. In September 2021, a schedule was announced with four teams: Les Buffalos de Ferme-Neuve, Maniwaki Mustangs, Smiths Falls Settlers, and Universal College. Le Bécard de Senneterre announced they would not be participating in the season. A week before the 2021–22 season was scheduled to begin, the league cancelled the season.

As of August 2022, the league appears to be defunct.

== Teams ==
Team	Location	Arena	Joined
Le Bécard de Senneterre	Senneterre, Quebec	Centre Sportif André Dubé	2019
Les Buffalos de Ferme-Neuve	Ferme-Neuve, Quebec	Centre Sportif Ben Leduc	2019
Maniwaki Mustangs	Maniwaki, Quebec	Gino Odjick Center	2017
Smiths Falls Settlers	Smiths Falls, Ontario	Smiths Falls Memorial Community Centre	2016 (Note: Relocated)

=== Former teams ===
- Akwesasne Chiefs – Announced team for the 2016–17 season; ceased operations before playing.
- Almonte Jr. Sharpshooters – Played the 2016–17 season, winning the inaugural championship; removed by the league at the end of the season. The organization joined the National College Prospects Hockey League (NCPHL). The NCPHL then folded and the Jr. Sharpshooters re-joined the CPJHL for 2017–18. Immediately removed from the league upon completion of the season. Joined the Greater Metro Junior A Hockey League for 2018–19 season as the Ottawa Sharpshooters.
- Bracebridge Pioneers – Played in the 2017–18 season, removed from the league after the 2018–19 season schedule was released.
- Brampton Royals – Originally announced to join in 2017–18, but were merged in the Grey Highlands Hawks for the season. Returned for 2018–19, but on November 7, 2018, the Royals' franchise was revoked by the league after 1–11 record, including two forfeits, and created the Greater Toronto Jaguars to replace the Royals under new ownership.
- Burk's Falls Bruins – Folded two weeks into the 2016–17 season without playing a game.
- Cobourg Galaxy – Membership revoked by the league after six games into the 2017–18 season for not having enough players.
- Coldwater Falcons – Announced team for the 2016–17 season; ceased operations before playing.
- Coldwater Ice Wolves – Expansion team for the 2017–18 season; the team was terminated in February 2019 during the 2018–19 season due to player disciplinary issues.
- Creemore Barley Kings – Announced for the 2017–18 season but removed from the league in early July.
- Eastern Ontario Hockey Academy (EOHA) – Joined from the recently defunct National College Prospects Hockey League (NCPHL) in 2017 and was also operated by the same organization of the Almonte Jr. Sharpshooters. The team was immediately removed from the league after the 2018 playoffs after the organization had broken league player participation rules.
- Essa Stallions – Founding members of CPJHL 2016–17, relocated to Coldwater as the Severn Stallions in the first week of the 2019–20 season.
- Grey Highlands Hawks – Founding members of CPJHL 2016–17, removed from the schedule in the first week of the 2019–20 season.
- Glengarry Highlanders – Founding members of CPJHL 2016–17. Relocated and rebranded as Smiths Falls Settlers for 2017–18.
- Greater Toronto Jaguars – Midseason replacement for the Brampton Royals in 2018. Played seven games, with a 3–4 record, from November 11 to December 16, 2018, before being removed from the schedule for the remainder of the season.
- Lake Erie Eagles – Founded in 2016 and joined CPJHL in 2017 from the National College Prospects Hockey League. After one season in the CPJHL, the Eagles' owner/head coach was offered to join a new franchise in the United States Premier Hockey League called the Lake Erie Bighorns and folded the Eagles citing operating costs in the CPJHL. The Bighorns also were removed from the USPHL just prior to the start of the 2018–19 season, but were re-added in 2019.
- Langton Royals – Played the 2019–20 season; not included in the reorganized league for 2021–22.
- Madawaska Valley Falcons – Expansion team for the 2017–18 season; suspended operations after 13 games.
- Muskoka Anglers – Played the 2018–19 season; franchise terminated during the 2019–20 season when the team owner was banned by the league.
- Muskoka Islanders – Announced for the 2020–21 season that was eventually never played; not included in the reorganized league for 2021–22 and never played a league game.
- Muskoka Wild – Played the 2016–17 season and were regular season champions. Team folded in the first week of the 2017–18 season.
- Niagara-on-the-Lake Nationals – Announced as a 2018–19 expansion franchise, officially terminated on July 29, 2018, as a CPJHL franchise citing recruiting concerns. The Nationals were added to the Greater Metro Junior A Hockey League the next day claiming they had already notified the CPJHL they were leaving the league prior to their franchise being terminated.
- Norwood Nemesis – Played the 2016–17 season in Norwood. Team relocated and rebranded as Cobourg Galaxy for 2017–18.
- O-Town Rebels – Played the 2016–17 season; membership revoked by the league.
- Scarborough Wexford Raiders – Played the 2018–19 season; franchise terminated during the 2019–20 season when the team owner was banned by the league.
- Seaforth Generals – One of the eight inaugural teams in the 2016–17 season; not included in the reorganized league for 2021–22.
- Severn Stallions – Relocated from Essa in the first week of the 2019–20 season; not included in the reorganized league for 2021–22.
- Shawville Express – Announced as a 2018–19 expansion team, during the beginning of the season the Express games were removed from the schedule and replaced by existing teams with a neutral site in Shawville. The team was then listed as a 2019–20 team but removed after the 2018–19 season ended.
- Universel College Unik – Announced as a 2018–19 expansion team, removed from league prior to schedule release. The team was then listed as a 2019–20 team but removed after the 2018–19 season ended.

== Regular season champions ==
Season	Team	Record	Pts
2016–17	Muskoka Wild	35–7–3–3	76
2017–18	Essa Stallions	42–2–0–0	84
2018–19	Grey Highlands Hawks	36–7–1	73
2019–20	Seaforth Generals	31–8–0	62

== Playoff champions ==
Season	Playoff Champions	Runner-up	Result
2017	Almonte Jr. Sharpshooters	Muskoka Wild	4–3 (OT)
2018	Essa Stallions	Smiths Falls Settlers	2-games-to-none
2019	Essa Stallions	Muskoka Anglers	2-games-to-none
2020	Not awarded due to COVID-19 pandemic		
