= Espanola Rivermen =

- City: Espanola, Ontario, Canada
- League: NOJHL; CIHL
- Operated: 2013–2015
- Home arena: Espanola Regional Recreational Complex
- Owner: Tim Clayden
- General manager: Chad Clarke
- Head coach: Tom McCarthy

The Espanola Rivermen were a Canadian junior ice hockey franchise based in Espanola, Ontario, Canada. They were founded as a part of the Northern Ontario Junior Hockey League, but joined the Canadian International Hockey League after one season.

== History ==
The Espanola Rivermen were granted expansion in the summer of 2013 to the Northern Ontario Junior Hockey League. They are the first junior club in Espanola since the demise of the Espanola Kings of the Greater Metro Junior A Hockey League and first NOJHL franchise since the Espanola Screaming Eagles.

As a condition of expansion, Tim Clayden, former owner of the North Bay Trappers and the Trenton Golden Hawks, would have to sell his Trappers' franchise to get the team in Espanola. When a buyer was found for the Trappers, his expansion was granted.

The Rivermen's first game was played in Kirkland Lake, Ontario against the Kirkland Lake Gold Miners on September 6, 2013. Despite an early 2–0 lead, the Rivermen would lose the game 8–3. Brandon Janke scored the first goal in team history, while Griffin Strain played the game in net. The next night, the Rivermen traveled to Iroquois Falls, Ontario to play the Abitibi Eskimos where the Rivermen won 3–1 to pick up their first franchise victory. Strain would get the win in net. The Rivermen's first home game was on September 27, 2013, as they host the Sudbury Nickel Barons. The Rivermen would win the game 5–4. The first home ice goal was scored by Cray Roberge, 14:35 into the first period, on a penalty shot. Brennan Dubchak would score the eventual winning goal 9:04 into the third period while Griffin Strain made 44 saves to pick up the historic win.

In the summer of 2014, Clayden opted to pull the Rivermen out of the NOJHL to form his own league. The newly formed Canadian International Hockey League boasted 8 teams, but within months lost most of its teams. The CIHL season ended with only two teams and the Town of Espanola cancelling their contract with the Rivermen organization. The CIHL folded in the spring of 2015 and Espanola had an NOJHL team within weeks, with the Espanola Express for the 2015–16 season.

== Season-by-season results ==
Season	GP	W	L	T	OTL	GF	GA	P	Results	Playoffs
2013–14	56	32	23	0	1	218	187	65	3rd NOJHL	Lost semi-final
2014–15	38	22	14	0	2	123	117	46	2nd CIHL	Lost final, 0-4 (Attack)
