= United Hockey Union =

Group of ice hockey leagues in North America

- Sport: Ice hockey
- Abbreviation: UHU
- Founded: 2012
- Affiliation: Amateur Athletic Union
- Chairman: Keith Noll
- CEO: Ron White

Official website
- www.unitedhockeyunion.com
- (United States)
- (Canada)

The United Hockey Union (UHU), founded in 2012, is a group of ice hockey leagues in North America. The UHU is overseen and insured by the Amateur Athletic Union. Neither body is recognized by USA Hockey, Hockey Canada, or the International Ice Hockey Federation.

== History ==
In 2011, the AAU expressed interest in sanctioning junior ice hockey leagues. Until this time, USA Hockey was the only governing body of ice hockey in the United States and is still the only organization recognized by the International Ice Hockey Federation.

In the summer of 2011, the Western States Hockey League (WSHL) defected from USA Hockey to join the AAU. As a test case, their 2011–12 season went without a hitch. In 2012, they were joined by the Northern States Junior Hockey League (NSHL) and the Midwest Junior Hockey League (MWJHL). At this point, their partnership, under AAU supervision, was named the United Hockey Union.

The UHU finished off the 2012–13 hockey season with the first-ever UHU National Junior Hockey Championship. The UHU Championship went to the WSHL's Idaho Jr. Steelheads in its inaugural run, with the Steelheads going undefeated in a six-team tournament held in Las Vegas, Nevada in April 2013.

In May 2014, the UHU added a fourth league, the Canadian International Hockey League (CIHL). In July 2014, the Canadian Independent Junior Hockey League (CIJHL) of British Columbia applied for AAU sanctioning as well, but despite the sanctioning, the league shuttered its doors in September without playing a single game.

On September 10, 2014, the NSHL left the AAU umbrella. On November 10, the CIHL also left the AAU umbrella over insurance and expansion disagreements. In turn, half the CIHL broke away and formed the World United Hockey League as UHU members. In March 2015, the MWJHL announced it was joining the United States Premier Hockey League (a USA Hockey-sanctioned league) as part of its new Midwest Division starting in the 2015–16 season.

In 2015, the AAU announced that WSHL had been promoted to "Tier II" and that it was adding a "Tier III" prospect league for WSHL development teams called the Western Prospects League. Despite using the USA Hockey sanctioning terms of Tier II and III, the UHU-sanctioned leagues continued to operate under pay-to-play terms (called tuition) similar to USA Hockey Tier III or Hockey Canada Junior A guidelines.

In 2016, the UHU added two new junior hockey leagues; the Canadian Premier Junior Hockey League and the National College Prospects Hockey League, The CPJHL planned to have no more than 12 teams centered around Barrie, Ontario, for the 2016–17 season and would start the season with eight teams. The NCPHL began its season with six teams. With the launch of these two leagues and several WSHL teams' affiliating with the NCPHL, it appeared the Western Prospects League had been dissolved.

On September 5, 2016, the UHU announced they would be launching a free-to-play Tier I league for the 2017–18 season. The new league was to consist of six founding teams affiliated with the current Tier II and Tier III leagues. On September 12, the new league was announced as the Central One Hockey League (C1HL) and composed of six WSHL organizations: the Colorado Jr. Eagles, Casper Coyotes, El Paso Rhinos, Ogden Mustangs, Oklahoma City Blazers, and the Springfield Express, although Ogden was later removed. However, sometime in early 2017, the C1HL website was taken down, replaced near the end of the year, and removed again in March 2018. Some teams have since mentioned that the launch of the C1HL had been postponed to the 2018–19 season. The UHU has also announced plans to launch a western Canada-based Tier II league in 2018, called the Western Provinces Hockey Association (WPHA), that began play as the Provinces Division of the WSHL in 2018–19. After one season, the WPHA's relationship with the WSHL dissolved and the WPHA teams left for the Ontatio-based Greater Metro Junior A Hockey League.

In the 2019–20 season, both the UHU's junior leagues had to cancel their postseasons due to the effects of the COVID-19 pandemic limiting travel and arena availability. The WSHL subsequently lost 11 teams to the United States Premier Hockey League (which had left USA Hockey sanctioning in 2017) and the North American 3 Hockey League. In May 2020, the WSHL also announced they had cancelled their 2020–21 season due to the pandemic.

== Leagues ==
League	Level	Joined	Teams	Most recent champion
Western States Hockey League	Tier II Junior	2012	9	El Paso Rhinos
Canadian Premier Junior Hockey League	Tier III Junior	2016	8	Essa Stallions

== Former members ==
- Canadian Independent Junior Hockey League (2014; announced, but never played)
- Canadian International Hockey League (2014; became an independent league in November 2014 and ceased operations after one season)
- Central One Hockey League (2016; announced for 2017–18, but never launched)
- Midwest Junior Hockey League (2013–15; joined the USPHL as part of the new USPHL-Midwest Division)
- National College Prospects Hockey League (2016–17; were removed from the UHU as a junior program and then described itself as a "junior-aged academic" league)
- National Collegiate Hockey Association (2014–17; a college league that was sanctioned by the UHU for some time but was removed from their list of leagues in 2017)
- Northern States Junior Hockey League (2012–14; became NA3EHL in October 2014)
- Tropical Elite Hockey League (2012; announced, but never played)
- Western Prospects League (2015–16; Tier III level prospect league for the newly promoted Tier II Western States Hockey League; replaced by the National College Prospects League as the WSHL's developmental league in 2016)
- World United Hockey League (2014–15; split from the CIHL in 2014 when it dropped UHU-sanctioning in November 2014; announced new teams for 2015–16 season but never played a game)

== Junior National Championships ==
Year	Champion	Runner-up	Score	Location
2013	Idaho Jr. Steelheads	(California) Bay Area Seals	5–1	Las Vegas, Nevada
2014	(Texas) El Paso Rhinos	Idaho Jr. Steelheads	6–3	Las Vegas, Nevada
