= Ringette Canada Hall of Fame =

Canadian sports hall of fame for ringette

Ringette Canada Hall of Fame French: Temple de la Renommée de Ringuette Canada
- Established: 1988
- Website: Ringette Canada Hall of Fame
- Inductees: 2 Founders; 8 Teams; 19 Athletes; 9 Coaches; 26 Builders; 13 Officials; 77 total

The Ringette Canada Hall of Fame was established in 1988 by Ringette Canada, Canada's governing body for ringette, to honor notable individuals and groups associated with the sport.

The Ringette Canada Hall of Fame includes six categories: founder, builder, official, team, coach, and athlete. A number of Canadian national ringette teams and their players have been inducted over the course of its existence, as well as organizers, administrators, coaches, and officials.

The first two Canadians were inducted in 1988: the two founders of ringette, Sam Jacks and Red McCarthy. Agnes Jacks CM, the wife of Sam Jacks, was inducted as a Builder in 1996.

The first builders to be inducted were June Tiessen and Terry Youngman (1989). Tiessen was Ringette Canada's first President (1974–75, 1976–77) while Youngman served as its president from 1981 to 1983. Youngman later lead the international development of the sport from 1983 to 1985 while serving as Ringette Canada's Past-President.

The first two teams to be inducted were world title winners Team Alberta from the 1990 World Ringette Championships (2005), and Team Canada West from the 1992 World Ringette Championships (2005). The first athlete to be inducted was Deb Marek (2001), the first coach to be inducted was Lyndsay Wheelans (2002), and the first official to be inducted was Denise Weeks (2001).

== List of members of the Ringette Canada Hall of Fame ==
The following is the list of Ringette Canada Hall of Fame members:

- Sam Jacks – 1988: Founder
- Mirl (Red) McCarthy – 1988: Founder
- June Tiessen – 1989: Builder
- Terry Youngman – 1989: Builder
- Bruce Kettles – 1990: Builder
- Herb Abrahams – 1990: Builder
- Betty Shields – 1992: Builder
- Nelson Ball – 1993: Builder
- Agnes Jacks CM – 1996: Builder
- Leon Morrissette – 1999: Builder
- Deb Marek – 2001: Athlete
- Denise Weeks – 2001: Official
- Reg Wood – 2001: Builder
- Audra Antoniuk – 2002: Builder
- Lyndsay Wheelans – 2002: Coach
- Doug MacQuarrie – 2002: Official
- Cara Brown – 2002: Athlete
- Jim Benning – 2003: Builder
- Jane Larkworthy – 2003: Official
- Linda (Tippin) Anderson – 2004: Coach
- 1990 world ringette championship team – 2005: Team
- 1992 world ringette championship team – 2005: Team
- Carolyn Bogusz – 2006: Athlete
- Clémence Duchesneau – 2006: Athlete
- MaryLee Ross – 2006: Coach
- Bernie Cockburn – 2006: Builder
- Marge (Marjorie) Knowles – 2007: Builder
- Cindy Annala – 2008: Athlete
- Lisa Brown – 2008: Athlete
- Lorrie Horne – 2008: Coach
- George McKenzie – 2009: Coach
- Maria (McKenzie) Thompson – 2009: Athlete
- Judy Diduck – 2009: Athlete
- Joanne Dearden – 2009: Builder
- 2002 World Ringette Championship Team – 2010: Team
- 1996 World Ringette Championship Team – 2010: Team
- Norm Laforest – 2010: Official
- Mark Renkiewicz – 2010: Official
- Rene Trumpler – 2010: Builder
- Steve Blacklock – 2010: Official
- Wes Clark – 2010: Builder
- Don Sally – 2010: Builder
- Bruce Heaslip – 2010: Builder
- Shelley (Reynolds) Derewianka – 2011: Athlete
- Herman Wills – 2011: Builder
- Stephan Blackman – 2011: Builder
- Chris George – 2011: Official
- Megan Todd – 2012: Athlete
- Jennifer (Willan) Krochak – 2012: Athlete
- Phyllis Sadoway – 2012: Coach
- Jim Dawson – 2012: Builder
- Peter Maik – 2013: Coach
- Iris Todd – 2013: Official
- Carly Ross – 2013: Athlete
- Laura Warner – 2013: Athlete
- 2012 U19 Team Canada East – 2014: Team
- Janice Cossar – 2014: Athlete
- Keely Brown – 2014: Athlete
- Laura Knowles – 2014: Official
- Tom Mayenknecht – 2014: Builder
- Beth Veale – 2014: Coach
- Cathy Over – 2015: Official
- Dave Wood – 2016: Coach
- Sarah (Miller) Ianni – 2016: Athlete
- 2016 Junior National Team – 2016: Team
- Danielle (Hobday) Hildebrand – 2017: Athlete
- Alexis Snowdon – 2017: Athlete
- Lucie Anne Ingoldsby – 2017: Official
- Dwayne Andreen – 2017: Builder
- 2017 Junior National Team – 2018: Team
- Kevin Lee – 2019: Official
- Karen (Duguay) Bunting – 2019: Athlete
- 2019 Junior National Team – 2020: Team
- Sue Blacklock – 2021: Official
- Yvon Brault – 2021: Builder
- Terry McAdam – 2021: Builder
- Alayne Martell – 2021: Builder
- Barry Hobday – 2022: Coach
- Beverly Ann Felske – 2022: Builder

== Inductees in World Ringette Championships ==
Listed below are the inductees who have also participated in the World Ringette Championships. Some members have been inducted more than once in different categories.

Inductees
Ringette Canada Hall of Fame
| Name | Year inducted | Category | WRC | Team/Participation | Profile |
Builders
| Reg Wood | 2001 | Builder | WRC 1990 | (Canada) Head coach (gold) 1990 Team Alberta | RCHoF |
| Alayne Martell | 2021 | Builder | | | RCHoF |
Teams
| 1990 Team Canada (Sr.) | 2005 | Team | WRC 1990 | (gold) 1990 Team Alberta | RCHoF |
| 1992 Team Canada West | 2005 | Team | WRC 1992 | (gold) 1992 Team Canada West | RCHoF |
| 2002 Team Canada (Sr.) | 2010 | Team | WRC 2002 | (gold) 2002 Team Canada (Sr.) | |
| 1996 Team Canada (Sr.) | 2010 | Team | WRC 1996 | (gold) 1996 Team Canada (Sr.) | |
| 2012 U19 Team Canada East | 2014 | Team | WJRC 2012 | (gold) 2012 U19 Team Canada East | |
| 2016 Team Canada (Jr.) | 2016 | Team | WRC 2016 | (gold) 2016 Team Canada (Jr.) | |
| 2017 Team Canada (Jr.) | 2018 | Team | WRC 2017 | (gold) 2017 Team Canada (Jr.) | |
| 2019 Team Canada (Jr.) | 2020 | Team | WRC 2019 | (gold) 2019 Team Canada (Jr.) | RCHoF |
Coaches
| Lyndsay Wheelans | 2002 | Coach | WRC 1990; WRC 1992; WRC 1994; WRC 1996; WRC 1998; WRC 2000; WRC 2004; WRC 2007 | Player; (gold) 1990 Team Alberta; (gold) 1992 Team Canada West; (bronze) 1994 Team Canada West Head coach (gold) 1996 Team Canada (Sr.); (silver) 2007 Team Canada (Sr.) Head coach (gold) 1998 Team Finland (Sr.) Assistant coach (silver) 2000 Team Canada (Sr.); (silver) 2004 Team Canada (Sr.) | RCHoF |
| Lorrie Horne | 2008 | Coach | WRC 1996; WRC 2000; WRC 2002; WRC 2004; WRC 2016; WRC 2017; WRC 2019 | Trainer; (gold) 1996 Team Canada (Sr.) (United States) Head coach (bronze) 2000 Team USA (Sr.) Head coach (gold) 2002 Team Canada (Sr.); (gold) 2016 Team Canada (Jr.); (gold) 2017 Team Canada (Jr.); (gold) 2019 Team Canada (Jr.) Coach; (silver) 2004 Team Canada (Sr.) | RCHoF |
| Phyllis Sadoway | 2012 | Coach | WRC 1996; WRC 2002; WRC 2004; WRC 2007; WRC 2010; WRC 2013; WRC 2022 | Head coach (gold) 1996 Team Canada (Sr.) Assistant coach (gold) 2002 Team Canada (Sr.) (United States) Assistant coach (gold) 2022 Team USA (Sr.) (President's Pool) (United States) Head coach (bronze) 2004 Team USA (Sr.); 4th | 2007 Team USA (Sr.); (bronze) 2010 Team USA (Sr.); (bronze) 2013 Team USA (Sr.) | RCHoF |
Athletes
| Deb Marek | 2001 | Athlete (Goalie) | WRC 1990; WRC 1992; WRC 1996; WRC 1998 | Player; (gold) 1990 Team Alberta; (gold) 1992 Team Canada West Assistant coach (gold) 1996 Team Canada (Sr.) Assistant coach (silver) 1998 Team Canada (Sr.) | RCHoF |
| Cara Brown | 2002 | Athlete | WRC 1990; WRC 1992; WRC 1994; WRC 1998 | (gold) 1990 Team Alberta; (gold) 1992 Team Canada West; (silver) 1994 Team Canada (Sr.); (silver) 1998 Team Canada (Sr.) | RCHoF |
| Clémence Duchesneau | 2006 | Athlete (Goalie) | WRC 1990; WRC 1992; WRC 1994 | (bronze) 1990 Team Quebec; (silver) 1992 Team Canada East; (silver) 1994 Team Canada East | |
| Carolyn Bogusz | 2006 | Athlete | WRC 1990; WRC 1992; WRC 1994 | (bronze) 1990 Team Quebec; (silver) 1992 Team Canada East; (silver) 1994 Team Canada East | |
| Lisa Brown | 2008 | Athlete | WRC 1990; WRC 1992; WRC 1996; WRC 1998; WRC 2000 | (gold) 1990 Team Alberta; (gold) 1992 Team Canada West; (gold) 1996 Team Canada (Sr.); (silver) 1998 Team Canada (Sr.); (silver) 2000 Team Canada (Sr.) | |
| Cindy Annala | 2008 | Athlete (Defense) | WRC 1990; WRC 1992 | (gold) 1990 Team Alberta; (gold) 1992 Team Canada West | |
| Maria (McKenzie) Thompson | 2009 | Athlete | WRC 1994; WRC 1996; WRC 1998; WRC 2000; WRC 2002 | (silver) 1994 Team Canada West; (gold) 1996 Team Canada (Sr.); (silver) 1998 Team Canada (Sr.); (silver) 2000 Team Canada (Sr.); (gold) 2002 Team Canada (Sr.) | |
| Judy Diduck | 2009 | Athlete | WRC 1990 | (gold) 1990 Team Alberta | |
| Shelley (Reynolds) Derewianka | 2011 | Athlete | WRC 1992; WRC 1996 | (gold) 1992 Team Canada West; (gold) 1996 Team Canada (Sr.) | |
| Megan Todd | 2012 | Athlete | WRC 2000; WRC 2002; WRC 2004; WRC 2007 | (silver) 2000 Team Canada (Sr.); (gold) 2002 Team Canada (Sr.); (silver) 2004 Team Canada (Sr.); (silver) 2007 Team Canada (Sr.) | |
| Jennifer (Willan) Krochak | 2012 | Athlete | WRC 1994; WRC 1996; WRC 2000 | (bronze) 1994 Team Canada West; (gold) 1996 Team Canada (Sr.); (silver) 2000 Team Canada (Sr.) | |
| Laura Warner | 2013 | Athlete | WRC 1996; WRC 2000; WRC 2002; WRC 2004 | (gold) 1996 Team Canada (Sr.); (silver) 2000 Team Canada (Sr.); (gold) 2002 Team Canada (Sr.) Captain; (silver) 2004 Team Canada (Sr.) Captain | RCHoF |
| Carly Ross | 2013 | Athlete | WRC 1996; WRC 2002; WRC 2004; WRC 2007 | (gold) 1996 Team Canada (Sr.); (gold) 2002 Team Canada (Sr.); (silver) 2004 Team Canada (Sr.); (silver) 2007 Team Canada (Sr.) | |
| Keely Brown | 2014 | Athlete (Goalie) | WRC 2000; WRC 2002; WRC 2004; WRC 2007; WRC 2010 WJRC 2012; WRC 2013; WRC 2022 | Player; (silver) 2000 Team Canada (Sr.); (gold) 2002 Team Canada (Sr.); (silver) 2004 Team Canada (Sr.); (silver) 2007 Team Canada (Sr.); (silver) 2010 Team Canada (Sr.) Goalie coach (silver) 2013 Team Canada (Sr.) Assistant coach\Goalie coach (bronze) 2012 Team Canada U19 West Assistant coach (silver) 2022 Team Canada (Jr.) Assistant coach 2023 Team Canada (Jr.) | RCHoF |
| Sarah (Miller) Ianni | 2016 | Athlete | WRC 1998; WRC 2002; WRC 2016; WRC 2017 | Player; (silver) 1998 Team Canada (Sr.); (gold) 2002 Team Canada (Sr.) Legacy coach (gold) 2016 Team Canada (Jr.) Assistant coach (gold) 2017 Team Canada (Jr.) | |
| Danielle (Hobday) Hildebrand | 2017 | Athlete | WRC 2000; WRC 2002; WRC 2004; WRC 2007; WRC 2016; WRC 2017 | Player; (silver) 2000 Team Canada (Sr.); (gold) 2002 Team Canada (Sr.); (silver) 2004 Team Canada (Sr.); (silver) 2007 Team Canada (Sr.) Legacy coach (gold) 2016 Team Canada (Jr.) Assistant coach (gold) 2017 Team Canada (Jr.) | |
| Alexis Snowdon | 2017 | Athlete | WRC 2002; WRC 2017; WRC 2019 | Player; (silver) 2002 Team Canada (Sr.) Player Development Consultant; (silver) 2017 Team Canada (Sr.) Assistant coach (silver) 2019 Team Canada (Sr.) | |
| Karen (Duguay) Bunting | 2019 | Athlete | WRC 1998; WRC 2000 | (silver) 1998 Team Canada (Sr.); (silver) 2000 Team Canada (Sr.) | RCHoF |
Officials
| Doug MacQuarrie | 2002 | Official | WRC 1990 | (Canada) WRC 1990 Official | |
| Jane Larkworthy | 2003 | Official | WRC 1990 | (Canada) WRC 1990 Director of Officials | |
| Steve Blacklock | 2010 | Official | WRC 1994; WRC 2004 | (Canada) WRC 1994 Official (Canada) WRC 2004 Official | |
| Denise Weeks | 2001 | Official | WRC 1992 | (Canada) WRC 1992 Official | RCHoF |
| Kevin Lee | 2019 | Official | WRC 2010 | (Canada) WRC 2010 Official | |
| Sue Blacklock | 2021 | Official | WRC 1994; WRC 2004 | (Canada) WRC 1994 Official (Canada) WRC 2004 Official | RCHoF |

== Other ==
=== Canada's Sports Hall of Fame ===
The following are inductees in Canada's Sports Hall of Fame:

- Sam Jacks was inducted into the Canada Sports Hall of Fame in 2007.

=== Alberta Sports Hall of Fame ===
The following are inductees in the Alberta Sports Hall of Fame:

- Team Canada West teams of 1990 and 1992 were inducted into the Alberta Sports Hall of Fame in the Groups and Teams category in 1994.
- Phyllis Sadoway was inducted into the Alberta Sports Hall of Fame in 2014.
- Reg Wood was inducted into the Alberta Sports Hall of Fame in 1994.

=== Saskatchewan Sports Hall of Fame ===
The following are inductees in the Saskatchewan Sports Hall of Fame:

- 1988 Regina Optimist Stingers Ringette Team - installed in the Saskatchewan Sports Hall of Fame on June 16, 2001. Accomplishments: 1998 Canadian Junior Ringette Champions (see Canadian Ringette Championships).

=== Manitoba Sports Hall of Fame and Museum ===
The following are inductees in the Manitoba Sports Hall of Fame and Museum:

- Andrea Ferguson ("Ando") was inducted into the Manitoba Sports Hall of Fame and Museum in 2022. She is the first ringette athlete to be inducted in its history.
