= Ringette Canada =

Ringette governing body of Canada

- Sport: Ringette
- Membership: 31,168 registered players (2017–18)
- Founded: 1974; 52 years ago
- Headquarters: Ottawa
- President: First: June Tiessen Current: Angie Milbury
- Coach: Team Canada Sr. (2023); Julie Blanchette: Team Canada Jr. U21 (2023); Andrea Ferguson

Official website
- ringette.ca
- (Canada)

Ringette Canada is the national governing body for the sport of ringette in Canada. It was established in 1974 with June Tiessen as its first President and has its current headquarters in Ottawa, Ontario. It is responsible for the organization and promotion of ringette on a nationwide basis and organizes Canada's semi-professional ringette league, the National Ringette League (NRL) which was established in 2004, with the league functioning as a committee under Ringette Canada.

In 1986, Ringette Canada became a member of the International Ringette Federation which at the time was known as the "World Ringette Council". Its national hall of fame, the Ringette Canada Hall of Fame, was established in 1988. The first time a Canadian ringette team traveled overseas to Europe (Finland) was in 1979.

With the help of Ringette Canada, the sport of ringette was first introduced as part of the Canada Winter Games program in 1991, when the games took place in Prince Edward Island. The sport has been a prominent part of this multi-sport national event ever since.

Ringette Canada is also responsible for scouting ringette talent in Canada in order to create the Canadian national ringette teams for both Team Canada Senior and Team Canada Junior who then compete at the World Ringette Championships. National team players are selected from the National Ringette League.

== History ==
=== Formation ===
While Ringette Canada was formed in 1974, ringette began in Canada as an established sport in 1963 due to the efforts of its two founders, Sam Jacks and Red McCarthy, and two primary organizations in Ontario, the Society of Directors of Municipal Recreation of Ontario (SDMRO), and the Northern Ontario Recreation Directors Association (NORDA) in particular.

In 1983, Ringette Canada acquired the copyright to the official Ringette rules and Ringette rulebook from the Ontario Ringette Association (now known as Ringette Ontario) which had the copyright transferred to it from the SDMRO in 1973.

Despite its importance to the Canadian sporting community, Ringette Canada initially received little financial support and no funding from the federal government. In order to hold their meetings, the Toronto Pearson International Airport generously donated a basement room which was used as a gathering space for the organization.

=== Ringette Canada Presidents ===
June Tiessen from Waterloo, Ontario, became the first President of Ringette Canada in 1974.

#	Year	President	City/Province
1	November 1974–75	June Tiessen; Ringette Canada Hall of Fame Inductee	Waterloo, Ontario
2	1975–76	Howard Pierce	Kingston, Ontario
3	1976–77	June Tiessen	Waterloo, Ontario
4	1977–80	Barry Mattern	Manitoba
5	1981–83	Terry Youngman; Ringette Canada Hall of Fame Inductee	Saskatchewan
6	1983	Betty Shields	Ottawa, Ontario
Current		Angie Milbury	

=== Sam Jacks Trophy ===
The original Sam Jacks Trophy for the World Ringette Championships was first awarded at the inaugural 1990 World Ringette Championships but was replaced with a new design at the 1996 World Ringette Championships. The original trophy is now kept in the Ringette Canada office.

=== Jeanne Sauvé Memorial Cup ===
The Jeanne Sauvé Memorial Cup was established by Ringette Canada President, Betty Shields in December 1984 and named after Jeanne Sauvé, Canada's first female Governor General. Originally called the "Jeanne Sauvé Cup", it was first presented at the 1985 Canadian Ringette Championships in Dollard-des-Ormeaux, Québec. It has since been renamed the, "Jeanne Sauvé Memorial Cup".

=== Cyber attack ===
Non-profit, grassroots organizations in sport became increasingly vulnerable to cyberattacks after the creation of the internet. In 2019, Ringette Canada became the target of a ransomware attack.

== Development ==
Year	Action	Organization, Event, or League
1973	Copyright to the official Ringette rules and Ringette rulebook transferred to the Ontario Ringette Association (now known as Ringette Ontario) from the Society of Directors of Municipal Recreation of Ontario (SDMRO)	- Society of Directors of Municipal Recreation of Ontario (SDMRO); - Ontario Ringette Association (now Ringette Ontario)
November 1974	Established national ringette organization	Ringette Canada; First President: June Tiessen of Waterloo, Ontario
Quebec 1978	Federation Sportive de Ringuette du Quebec withdraws from Ringette Canada but returns in 1981.	Federation Sportive de Ringuette du Quebec
Winnipeg 1979	Established elite national ringette championships	Canadian Ringette Championships
1983	Acquired copyright to ringette's official rules from the Ontario Ringette Association (now "Ringette Ontario")	Ontario Ringette Association (now "Ringette Ontario")
1986	Canada becomes a member of the "World Ringette Council", now known as the International Ringette Federation (IRF)	International Ringette Federation (formerly the "World Ringette Council")
1988	Established national hall of fame for ringette	Ringette Canada Hall of Fame
1990	Canada makes its world debut in ringette sending 6 separate regional teams to the inaugural World Ringette Championships	1990 World Ringette Championships: 1990 Team Alberta (Calgary Debs); 1990 Team Ontario; 1990 Team Quebec; 1990 Team Saskatchewan; 1990 Team Manitoba; 1990 Team Gloucester
1996	Team Canada (now Team Canada Senior) makes its world debut at the World Ringette Championships having previously sent separate regional teams	1996 World Ringette Championships: 1996 Seniors
2004	Established semi-professional league	National Ringette League
2009	Canada makes its world junior debut sending 2 separate regional teams to the inaugural World Junior Ringette Championships	2009 World Junior Ringette Championships: 2009 U19 Team Canada East; 2009 U19 Team Canada West
2013	Team Canada Junior makes its world debut at the World Ringette Championships having previously sent separate regional teams	2013 World Ringette Championships: 2013 Juniors

== Provincial and Territorial associations ==
Beginning in 1969 with the Ontario Ringette Association (now called Ringette Ontario), provincial ringette associations continued to develop across Canada. See the table below for development.

Association	Founded	History and notes
Ringette Ontario	1969	In 1969, the Ontario Ringette Association (now Ringette Ontario) was established as the first provincial sport governing body in Canada devoted to the advancement of Ringette. Dave Bass was its first President. It had 1,500 players in 14 communities and was founded with a government grant of $229.27.
Ringette Manitoba	1972	In 1972, Barry Mattern founded the Manitoba Ringette Association (now Ringette Manitoba) who later went on to become a President of Ringette Canada.
Ringuette Québec	1973	Originally called the Quebec Ringette Association, this organization was formed in 1973 with Pierrefonds' Lois Logan as its first President. In 1978, the Federation Sportive de Ringuette du Quebec withdrew from Ringette Canada. The association returned in 1981.
Ringette Nova Scotia	1974	Initially called the Nova Scotia Ringette Association, this organization was formed under the leadership of Herm Wills who became its first President in 1974.
BC Ringette	1974	1974 British Columbia became Canada's fifth province to form a provincial ringette association in 1974.
Ringette Alberta	1976	In 1976, Alberta joined the growing number of provinces embracing ringette, forming its own provincial association under Nelson Ball's guidance.
Ringette Saskatchewan	1976	Initially called the Saskatchewan Ringette Association, this organization became Canada's seventh provincial sport governing body for ringette under Bob Gotts in 1976.
Ringette New Brunswick (Ringuette NB Ringette)	1981	New Brunswick formed Canada's eighth provincial ringette association with Gilles Laplante as first President in 1981.
Newfoundland and Labrador Ringette	1982	Newfoundland formed its provincial ringette association in 1982. Francis Walsh was its first President.
P.E.I. Ringette	1985	Prince Edward Island formed Canada's tenth provincial ringette member in 1985 with Vimmy Gregory as its first President.
Northwest Territories Ringette	1986	The Northwest Territories became Canada's 11th provincial member in ringette in 1986. Denis Fedun was its first president.

== National championships ==
The Canadian Ringette Championships (French: Championnats Canadien d'Ringuette) which is abbreviated CRC in english, is the annual premiere national ringette tournament for the best ringette players and teams in Canada and consists of three groups: the Under-16 (U16), the Under-19 (U19), and the elite ringette players in the National Ringette League (NRL) for which the CRC's serve as the league's seasonal championship. The first tournament was held in Winnipeg, Manitoba in 1979.

== Semi-professional league ==
Canada's semi-professional ringette league is the National Ringette League (NRL) which was established in 2004. The majority of Canada's national ringette team players compete in the NRL.

== National teams ==
The Canadian national ringette team includes two separate teams: Team Canada Senior and Team Canada Junior, with both teams now competing at the World Ringette Championships. Canada has competed in all of the World Ringette Championships since the sport's inaugural world competition in 1990, but it has only been since the 2013 World Ringette Championships that both national teams have competed in the World Ringette Championships together since both age divisions initially held their world championship tournaments separately.

=== Senior national team ===
Canada's first appearance in international competition for the sport of ringette took place at the inaugural World Ringette Championships in 1990. At the time, the country sent six separate regional teams as its national representative: Team Alberta (Calgary Debs), Team Ontario, Team Quebec, Team Saskatchewan, and Team Manitoba. Another team, Team Gloucester, also competed since the first tournament was hosted in Gloucester, Ontario. It wasn't until the 1996 World Ringette Championships that Canada officially finally sent its first, single and exclusive national ringette team.

=== Junior national team ===
Until the 2009 World Junior Ringette Championships, Canada only had national representation at the adult level (now known as Team Canada Senior) since the World Ringette Championships were specifically reserved for elite women athletes. Canada didn't have any Team Canada Junior representation of any kind until the inaugural 2009 World Junior Ringette Championships, but at that time sent two separate regional teams: U19 Canada East (Under-29) and U19 Canada West (Under-19). Team Canada Junior has periodically alternated between the age groups of U19 and U21 since 2009.

Until the 2013 World Ringette Championships, the junior tournament was held as a separate event. Junior national teams competed at the World Junior Ringette Championships in 2009 and 2012, while the senior national teams competed at the World Ringette Championships. In 2013 the senior and junior tournaments merged into a single one, the World Ringette Championships, where Canada's first single and exclusive national junior ringette team made its world debut. Team Canada Junior has competed in every world junior event.

== University and college ringette ==
Ringette is played at a number of Canadian universities and colleges who abide by rules and regulations organized by Ringette Canada. An national tournament called the, "University Challenge Cup" is played annually.

Ringette is not recognized by U Sports, the national sport governing body of university sport in Canada, however each institution establishes its own relationship with the ringette program associated with their respective campuses. Some institutions allow the ringette program to wear the varsity uniforms and use the team nickname while others have no relationship with the ringette program at all.

== See also ==
- Ringette
- Ringette in Canada
- Ringette Finland
- Sweden Ringette Association
- International Ringette Federation
- Sam Jacks
- Red McCarthy
