= Lyndsay Wheelans =

Former Canadian national and international ringette player and coach

Personal information
- Born: Calgary, Alberta, Canada

Sport
- Sport: Ringette
Medal record
Event	1st	2nd	3rd
Canada: World Ringette Championships	3	3	0
Finland: EuroTour Summit Series	1	0	0
Total	4	3	0
Ringette
World Ringette Championships
Representing Canada
Gold medal – first place	1990 Gloucester, Canada	Team
Gold medal – first place	1992 Helsinki, Finland	Team
Gold medal – first place	1996 Stockholm, Sweden	Team (Head coach)
Silver medal – second place	2000 Espoo and Lahti, Finland	Team (Assistant coach)
Silver medal – second place	2004 Huddinge, Sweden	Team (Assistant coach)
Silver medal – second place	2007 Ottawa, Canada	Team (Head coach)
Representing Finland
Gold medal – first place	1998 Summit Series: Finland, Sweden, Germany, France	Team (Head coach)

Lyndsay Wheelans is a former Canadian national level ringette athlete and coach who was born in Calgary, Alberta, and raised in Edmonton. She played successfully for the Canadian national ringette team and coached both Team Canada and Team Finland in the World Ringette Championships (WRC). She was Head Coach of Team Canada from 2006 - 2011 (5 years). For over 25 years, Wheelans has been playing ringette and coaching at both national and international levels, starting in 1988.

Wheelans has been inducted into the Ringette Canada Hall of Fame (RCHoF) three times: twice as a member of separate Canadian world title winning teams, and once as a coach.

== Ringette career ==
Wheelans is known for her impressive background in ringette, having been a player on the only Canadian ringette team to win two consecutive world championships in 1990 and 1992.

After her player career, she focused on coaching and led Team Canada to a gold medal victory in 1996 as head coach and was an assistant coach for both silver medal wins in 2000 and 2004. Additionally, Wheelans was the head coach for the Finnish National Team during the 1998 Summit Series where they earned gold. When Canada hosted the 2007 World Ringette Championships, she was appointed as head coach for Team Canada.

Wheelans held the position of technical director for Ringette Canada from 1998 to 2001 and has been involved with Ringette Canada's coaching committee.

== Ringette Canada Hall of Fame ==
Wheelans has been recognized and inducted into the Ringette Canada Hall of Fame (RCHoF) three times for her remarkable achievements. She was honored twice as a member of different world championship-winning teams and once as a coach.

In 2005 in the "Team" category, she was inducted for having been a member of the Canadian team, Team Alberta, who won the World Ringette Championships (WRC) world title at the inaugural WRC in 1990, and was also inducted for having been a member of Team Canada West who won the world title at the 1992 World Ringette Championships.

In 2002 she was inducted into the Ringette Canada Hall of Fame, recognized for her achievements as a coach.

== See also ==
- Canada national ringette team
- Keely Brown (goaltender)
- Shelly Hruska
- Julie Blanchette
- Stéphanie Séguin
- Erin Cumpstone
- Jennifer Hartley

== Sources ==
1. "Lyndsay Wheelans - Ringette Canada Hall of Fame". Ringette Canada. Retrieved May 3, 2021.
2. "Lyndsay Wheelans named Head Coach of Canadian Senior National Ringette Team for 2007 World Ringette Championships". Ringette Canada. January 8, 2007. Retrieved May 3, 2021.
3. "Lyndsay Wheelans". Ottawa Sport Hall of Fame. Retrieved May 3, 2021.
