= Sweden national ringette team =

Girl's and women's national ringette teams representing Sweden

Sweden
- Nickname: Team Sweden
- Association: Sweden Ringette Association (Swedish: Svenska Ringetteförbundet)
- Team colors
Home colours	Away colours

First international
- Senior: (Sweden) 1992 (Senior) (Helsinki, Finland; 1992) Junior: (Sweden) 2016 (President's Pool) (Helsinki, Finland; 2016)

World Ringette Championships
- Appearances: Junior: 1 (first in 2016) Senior: 12 excluding 1998 Summit Series (first in 1992)
- Best result: Senior: Senior Pool; (bronze) 3rd; 2007, 2016; President's Pool; (silver) 2nd; 2022, 2023; (gold) 1st; 2017, 2019, 2025; Junior: President's Pool; 5th; 2016

Medal record

World Ringette Championships

Seniors
	Senior; 1990 Gloucester	No team
	Senior; 1992 Helsinki	Team
	Senior; 1994 Saint Paul	Team
	Senior; 1996 Stockholm	Team
	1998 Summit Series; Turku, Gothenburg, Osnabruck, Colmar	No team
	Senior; 2000 Espoo and Lahti	Team
	Senior; 2002 Edmonton	Team
	Senior; 2004 Stockholm	Team
	Senior; 2007 Ottawa	Team
	Senior; 2010 Tampere	Team
	President's Pool; 2013 North Bay	Team
Bronze medal – third place	Senior Pool; 2016 Helsinki	Team
Bronze medal – third place	Junior Pool; 2016 Helsinki	Team
Gold medal – first place	President's Pool; 2017 Helsinki	Team
Gold medal – first place	President's Pool; 2019 Burnaby	Team
	2021 Helsinki	Cancelled
Silver medal – second place	President's Pool; 2022 Espoo	Team
Silver medal – second place	President's Pool; 2023 Calgary	Team
Gold medal – first place	President's Pool; 2025 Lahti	Team

World Junior Ringette Championships

Juniors
	2009 Prague	No team
	2012 London	No team

World Ringette Championships

Juniors
	2013 North Bay	No team
	2016 Tampere	Team
	2017 Mississauga	No team
	2019 Burnaby	No team
	2021 Helsinki	Cancelled
	2022 Espoo	No team
- 2023 Calgary

The Sweden national ringette team (Swedish: Svenska Ringettelandslaget), more commonly known as "Team Sweden", is the ringette team representing Sweden internationally. Sweden has both a senior national ringette team and a junior national ringette team. Both Team Sweden Senior and Team Sweden Junior are overseen by the Sweden Ringette Association (SRA), (Swedish: Svenska Ringetteförbundet) and compete in the World Ringette Championships (WRC). The SRA is a member of the International Ringette Federation (IRF). Sweden's first appearance in international ringette took place at the second World Ringette Championships in 1992. Team USA is Team Sweden's arch-rival with both teams competing in the President's Pool against Team Czech.

Though Sweden joined the IRF in 1986, which at the time was known as the "World Ringette Council", the Sweden Ringette Association was not formed until 1994, then was elected as an associate member of the Swedish Sports Confederation in 2003.

== History ==
Team Sweden (now Team Sweden Senior) made its international ringette debut in 1992 at the second World Ringette Championships (WRC) in Helsinki, Finland, where the 1992 Sweden team finished in sixth place. At the time there was only one division where athletes could compete and was reserved strictly for women.

While the World Junior Ringette Championships first began in 2009 and occurred again in 2012, Sweden never sent a junior team to compete at either world tournament. The world junior tournament merged with the world championship program for senior teams in 2013 where world titles for a Senior Pool, Junior Pool, and President's Pool were contested. There was an exception in WRC 2016 whereby the Team Sweden Senior competed the Senior Pool and Team Sweden Junior competed in the Junior Pool.

Sweden's first junior national team (U19) was formed in 2016 and competed in the 2016 World Ringette Championships. They did not compete in 2017 and have yet to return to the world stage.

== World Championship record ==
=== Senior Sweden ===
(Seniors) World Ringette Championships
Year	Location	Result
1990	(Canada) Gloucester	No team
1992	(Finland) Helsinki	Senior; 6th
1994	(United States) Saint Paul	Senior; 6th
1996	(Sweden) Stockholm	Senior; 4th
1998 "Summit Series"	Void	
2000	(Finland) Espoo and Lahti	Senior; 4th
2002	(Canada) Edmonton	Senior; 4th
2004	(Sweden) Stockholm	Senior; 4th
2007	(Canada) Ottawa	Senior; Bronze
2010	(Finland) Tampere	Senior; 4th
2013	(Canada) North Bay	4th
2016	(Finland) Helsinki	Senior Pool; Bronze; Junior Pool; Bronze
2017	(Canada) Mississauga	President's; Gold
2019	(Canada) Burnaby	President's; Gold
2021	(Finland) Helsinki	cancelled
2022	(Finland) Espoo	President's; Silver

=== Junior Sweden ===
(Juniors) World Ringette Championships
Year	Location	Result
2009	(Czech Republic) Prague	No team
2012	(Canada) London, Ontario	No team
2013	(Canada) North Bay	No team
2016	(Finland) Helsinki	5th
2017	(Canada) Mississauga	No team
2019	(Canada) Burnaby	No team
2021	(Finland) Helsinki	cancelled
2022	(Finland) Espoo	

== Team Sweden Senior ==
Team Sweden (Senior) made its world debut at the second World Ringette Championships (WRC) in 1992. The senior team has competed in every WRC with the exception of the world competition's inaugural year in 1990, the 1998 World Ringette Championships which was replaced by a 1998 Summit series between Team Canada and Team Finland, and the 2021 World Ringette Championships when the tournament was cancelled due to COVID-19.

=== 1998 Seniors ===
The 1998 World Ringette Championships were initially meant to be held in Moncton, New Brunswick, Canada. Instead a promotional five game ringette "Summit Series" tour of Europe was organized with a series of games between a Team Canada, and Team Finland between February 27 and March 7, 1998. Team Sweden Senior did not compete that year.

== Team Sweden Junior ==
Team Sweden Junior (U19) made its first world appearance at the 2016 World Ringette Championships in Helsinki, Finland. However, Sweden has yet to field another junior national team and has not returned to the world stage as of yet.

== See also ==
- Sweden Ringette Association
- Ringette
- World Ringette Championships
  - Canada national ringette team
  - Finland national ringette team
  - United States national ringette team
  - Czech Republic national ringette team
- International Ringette Federation
- Sam Jacks
- Juhani "Juuso" Wahlsten
