= Judy Diduck =

Canadian ringette and ice hockey player

- Born: April 21, 1966 (age 60) Edmonton, Alberta, Canada
- Height: 5 ft 6 in (168 cm)
- Weight: 139 lb (63 kg; 9 st 13 lb)
- Position: Defence
- Shot: L
- Played for: Canada national ringette team Edmonton Chimos; Alberta Pandas; Canada women's national ice hockey team
- National team: Canada
- Playing career: 1990–1998
Medal record
Representing Canada
Ringette
World Ringette Championships
Gold medal – first place	1990 Canada	Team
Representing Canada
Women's ice hockey
Winter Olympic Games
Silver medal – second place	1998 Nagano	Tournament
IIHF World Women's Championships
Gold medal – first place	1990 Canada	Tournament
Gold medal – first place	1992 Finland	Tournament
Gold medal – first place	1994 United States	Tournament
Gold medal – first place	1997 Canada	Tournament

Judy Diduck (/ˈdɪdək/ DID-ək; born April 21, 1966) is a retired Canadian ringette and ice hockey player. Diduck was born in Edmonton, Alberta, but grew up in Sherwood Park, Alberta. She competed in the first World Ringette Championships in 1990 for Team Alberta who became the first world champions in the sport. In 2005, she was inducted into the Ringette Canada Hall of Fame. Diduck is also a former member of the Canada women's national ice hockey team.

== Career ==
=== Ringette ===
Diduck was one of the first players to join ringette when the sport was first introduced to Alberta in Sherwood Park. From 1979 to 1983, Judy competed in the first five consecutive Canadian Ringette Championships and she also played on the gold medal winning Team Alberta in the first World Ringette Championships in 1990 which resulted in her being inducted in the Ringette Canada Hall of Fame in 2005 as a member of Team Alberta who won the world title.

=== Ice hockey ===
Diduck eventually played for the Edmonton Chimos. She played with the Chimos at the 1998 Esso Nationals, scoring a goal in the bronze medal game as the team secured third place. Her final international tournament was the 1998 Winter Olympics, where women's ice hockey was being contested officially for the first time. After retiring from Team Canada, she entered the University of Alberta. As a student, she played for the University of Alberta Pandas women's ice hockey program. Since 2005, she has worked as an assistant coach for the Pandas team.

==== Coach ====
After winning silver at the 1998 Nagano Winter Olympics, she became the assistant coach of the women's hockey team in the University of Alberta.

== Personal life ==
Her brother, Gerald Diduck played in the National Hockey League.

== Career stats ==
=== International ===
Year	Team	Event	Result	GP	G	A	Pts	PIM
1990	Canada	WC	1st place, gold medalist(s)	5	1	0	1	6
1992	Canada	WC	1st place, gold medalist(s)	5	0	1	1	2
1994	Canada	WC	1st place, gold medalist(s)	5	0	6	6	0
1997	Canada	WC	1st place, gold medalist(s)	5	0	3	3	4
1998	Canada	OG	2nd place, silver medalist(s)	6	1	2	3	10

== Awards and honours ==
- Team Alberta Most Sportsmanlike Player, 2000 Esso Women's Nationals
- Judy Diduck, 2003 CIS Second Team All-Canadian
- Judy Diduck, 2004 CIS First Team All-Canadian
- Ringette Canada Hall of Fame inductee 2005 (as a team member)

Preceded by Krysty Lorenz (2000-02)	Alberta Pandas women's ice hockey Captain; 2002-04	Succeeded by Danielle Bourgeois (2004-05)
