= Boart Longyear Memorial Gardens =

Stadium in North Bay, Ontario, Canada

Coordinates: 46°18′51.07″N 79°26′56.30″W

- Location within Ontario Location within Canada
- Former names: North Bay Memorial Gardens (1955-2025)
- Location: 100 Chippewa Street West; North Bay, Ontario, Canada
- Owner: City of North Bay
- Operator: City of North Bay
- Capacity: Ice Hockey: 4,262
- Surface: Multi-surface

Construction
- Groundbreaking: 1954
- Opened: November 14, 1955
- Renovated: 2013
- Cost: $714,000 ($39.6 million in 2025 dollars)

Tenants
- North Bay Centennials (OHL) (1982-2002); North Bay Trappers (NOJHL) (2002-2014); Nipissing Lakers (OUA) (2009-present); North Bay Battalion (OHL) (2013-present)

The Boart Longyear Memorial Gardens is an arena located in North Bay, Ontario. It was built in 1955 and has a capacity of 4,246 and was originally named North Bay Memorial Gardens. The Gardens hosted the North Bay Centennials ice hockey team from 1982 to 2002, before they moved to Saginaw, Michigan. The arena's primary tenants today are the North Bay Battalion of the OHL and the Nipissing Lakers men's and women's ice hockey team of the OUA.

In 2007 Memorial Gardens played host to the Atlanta Thrashers and New York Islanders for a pre-season game after the city of North Bay was crowned as Hockeyville. The City and the Committee that brought Hockeyville to North Bay used the prize money to put up a new electronic rink sign.

The arena underwent a $12 million renovation for the new OHL franchise, the North Bay Battalion's arrival for the 2013–2014 season, also signing a 15-year lease with the arena. As part of the renovations, the seating capacity was increased, the ice surface was reconfigured to new OHL standards, 10 private boxes were added as well as a new 2-level team dressing room. The renovations were first $600,000 over budget even though promises were made to cut the renovations if it went over the $12 million mark by local government who ended up making special funds out of reserve to pay the cost overruns. Six weeks later a further $4.5 million was announced as spent on the project without the knowledge of local government from city taxpayers accounts, with an audit being called that later revealed little paper work and no communication of costs were done on the city's largest municipal project.

It hosted the 2013 World Ringette Championships as well as the 2018 Ford World Women's Curling Championship.

== Naming rights ==
In January 2025 the City of North Bay announced that Boart Longyear acquired the naming rights to the arena, which is now officially named Boart Longyear Memorial Gardens.
