= 1992 World Ringette Championships =

1992 edition of the World Ringette Championships

2nd World Ringette Championships

Tournament details
- Host country: Finland
- City: Helsinki
- Dates: March 4–8, 1992
- Teams: 6

Final positions
- Champions: Canada West (Team Alberta "AAA")
- Runners-up: Canada East
- Third place: Finland
- Fourth place: United States

The 1992 World Ringette Championships (1992 WRC) was an international ringette tournament, the 2nd (II) World Ringette Championships, and was organized by the World Ringette Council, the precursor to the International Ringette Federation (IRF). The tournament was contested in Helsinki, Finland, from March 4 to 8, 1992.

Teams from six countries competed: Canada, Finland, the United States, Sweden, Russia, and France.

== Overview ==
There were two Canadian ringette teams, Team Canada East and Team Canada West (Team Alberta "AAA"). Also present was Team Finland, Team USA, Team France, Team Sweden, and Team Russia.

Team Canada West won gold. Twelve members of Team Alberta were members of the Calgary Deb AA team.

== Venue ==
The tournament was contested in Helsinki, Finland.

== Teams ==
1992 WRC Rosters
1992 Team Finland
1992 Team Canada East
1992 Team Canada West
(United States) 1992 Team USA
1992 Team Sweden
1992 Team Russia

== Final standings ==
	Country	Team
1st place, gold medalist(s)	Canada	Team Canada West (Team Alberta "AAA")
2nd place, silver medalist(s)	Canada	Team Canada East
3rd place, bronze medalist(s)	Finland	Team Finland
4th	(United States) USA	(United States) Team USA
5th	Russia	Team Russia
6th	Sweden	Team Sweden

== Rosters ==
=== Team Finland ===
The 1992 Team Finland Senior team competed at the 1992 World Ringette Championships and won the bronze medal. The team won the bronze medal. Petra Vaarakallio was a member of the winning team, but eventually stopped playing ringette after receiving a six-month suspension for kicking an opponent who was lying on the ice during a ringette game. The team also included Arja Oksanen, Satu Himberg, Marika Mäkinen, and Mia Melkinen.

=== Team Canada ===
Two teams represented Canada at the 1992 World Ringette Championships: Team Canada East and Team Canada West. Team Canada West (Team Alberta "AAA") included twelve members originating from the 1991–1992 Calgary Deb "AA" ringette team. Clémence Duchesneau of 1992 Team Canada East was named the tournament's top goalie.

==== Team Canada West ====
1992 Team Canada West was inducted into the Ringette Canada Hall of Fame in 2005 and were inducted in the Alberta Sports Hall of Fame in 1994.

The 1992 Team Canada West gold medal team included the following (which includes 11 returning members from the 1990 team who are marked by asterisks):

Name	Position	Home city or town
Deb Marek*	Goaltender	Edmonton
Anne Gillespie*	Goaltender
Tamara Anderson	Goaltender	Calgary
Cindy Annala*	Defence
Cara Brown*
Lisa Brown*
Nicole Chapdelaine		Fort Saskatechwan
Shelley Reynolds
Jenny Cook		Calgary
Susan Curran		Calgary
Tammy (Tami) Ironside		Calgary
Jackie Richards		Calgary
Kristal Zwarych		Calgary
Stacey Hannay		Sherwood Park
Shauna Flath*
Diana Kondrosky*
Tanya Orr*
Holly Reeves*
Jennifer Rogers*
Lyndsay Wheelans*
Shelley Reynolds		Fort Saskatchewan
Team Staff
Head coach	Cheryl Govenlock	Edmonton
Assistant coach	Karen White
Officials
Official	Denise Weeks

=== Team USA ===
Max Feierstein was the head coach of Team USA.

Preceded by Gloucester 1990	World Ringette Championships; Helsinki; 1992 World Ringette Championships	Succeeded by Saint Paul 1994
