= 1994 World Ringette Championships =

1994 edition of the World Ringette Championships

3rd World Ringette Championships

Tournament details
- Host country: United States
- City: Saint Paul, Minnesota
- Venue: Rosemount Community Center/Arena
- Dates: March 19–27, 1994
- Teams: 6

Final positions
- Champions: Finland
- Runners-up: Canada East
- Third place: Canada West
- Fourth place: United States

The 1994 World Ringette Championships (1994 WRC) was an international ringette tournament and the 3rd (III) World Ringette Championships, and was the first tournament organized by the International Ringette Federation (IRF) which had previously been called the "World Ringette Council". The tournament was contested in the city of Saint Paul, Minnesota, in the United States, between March 19 and 27, 1994, at the Rosemount Community Center/Arena in South St. Paul.

== Overview ==
WRC 1994 was hosted in Minnesota, USA. In the previous World Championship, the 1992 World Ringette Championship, there were two Canadian teams competing, and in 1994 Canada sent two separate teams to compete for Canada once again.

Also present were national ringette teams from other countries: Team Finland, Team USA, Team Sweden, and Team Russia. Finland won the World Cup, its very first world championship. WRC 1994 marked the first time Finland broke into the medal standings since Team Canada began dominating the competition in 1990.

Finland defeated Team Canada East 4-2 in the final with Finland's Kristiina Vidlund scoring three goals. Finland's team leader was Eva Valtanen and the Captain was Satu Himberg. The team was coached by Jussi Voutilainen. The team practiced and trained at Myyrmäki-halli (Myyrmäki Hall).

== Venue ==
The tournament was contested in the city of Saint Paul, Minnesota, in the United States at the Rosemount Community Center/Arena in South St. Paul.

== Teams ==
1994 WRC Rosters
1994 Team Finland
1994 Team Canada East
1994 Team Canada West
(United States) 1994 Team USA
1994 Team Sweden
1994 Team Russia

== Final standings ==
	Country	Team
1st place, gold medalist(s)	Finland	Team Finland
2nd place, silver medalist(s)	Canada	Team Canada East
3rd place, bronze medalist(s)	Canada	Team Canada West
4th	(United States) USA	(United States) Team USA
5th	Russia	Team Russia
6th	Sweden	Team Sweden

== Rosters ==
=== Team Finland ===
The 1994 Team Finland Senior team competed at the 1994 WRC and included players Arja Oksanen, Kirsi Annila, Petra Ojaranta, Annukka Koivuniemi, Kristiina Vidlund, and Kristiina Siitonen.

=== Team Canada ===
Two teams represented Canada at the 1994 World Ringette Championships: Team Canada East, and Team Canada West. Clémence Duchesneau, a member of 1994 Team Canada East, was named the tournament's top goalie.

==== Team Canada East ====
The 1994 Team Canada East team included the following:

Name
Clémence Duchesneau - Goaltender
Kim Poirier
Gail MacCartney
Terri Zerbisias
Tamara Durante
Brandy Leadbetter
Julie Smith
Carolyn Bogusz
Tamara McKernan
Jodi Connolly
Mai-Lan Le
Sylvie Girard
Ashley Cook
Kellie Rae Ryan
Team Staff
Coach	Joey Black
Coach	Stephan Blackman
Coach	Carol Zerbisias

==== Team Canada West ====
The 1994 Team Canada West team included the following:

Pos.	Number	Name
Goaltender		Tamara Anderson
Goaltender		Anne Gillespie
Goaltender		Kara Ericksen
		Trina Janssens
		Maria (McKenzie) Thompson
		Kimberly Fisher
		Jeanette Cook
		Cara Brown
		Jacinda Chomik
		Jennifer (Willan) Krochak
		Diana Kondrosky
		Lyndsay Wheelans
		Shelley Potter
		Cindy Annala
		Shelly Reynolds
		Kari Sadoway
		Jennifer Rogers
		Jacqueline Richards
		Stacey Hanney
Team Staff
Coach		Karen Whire
Coach		John Fisher
Coach		Lorrie Home
Assistant Coach		Deb Marek

== See also ==
- World Ringette Championships
- International Ringette Federation
- Canada national ringette team
- Finland national ringette team
- Sweden national ringette team
- United States national ringette team

Preceded by Helsinki 1992	World Ringette Championships; Saint Paul; 1994 World Ringette Championships	Succeeded by Stockholm 1996
