= Julie Blanchette =

Canadian ringette player, trainer and coach

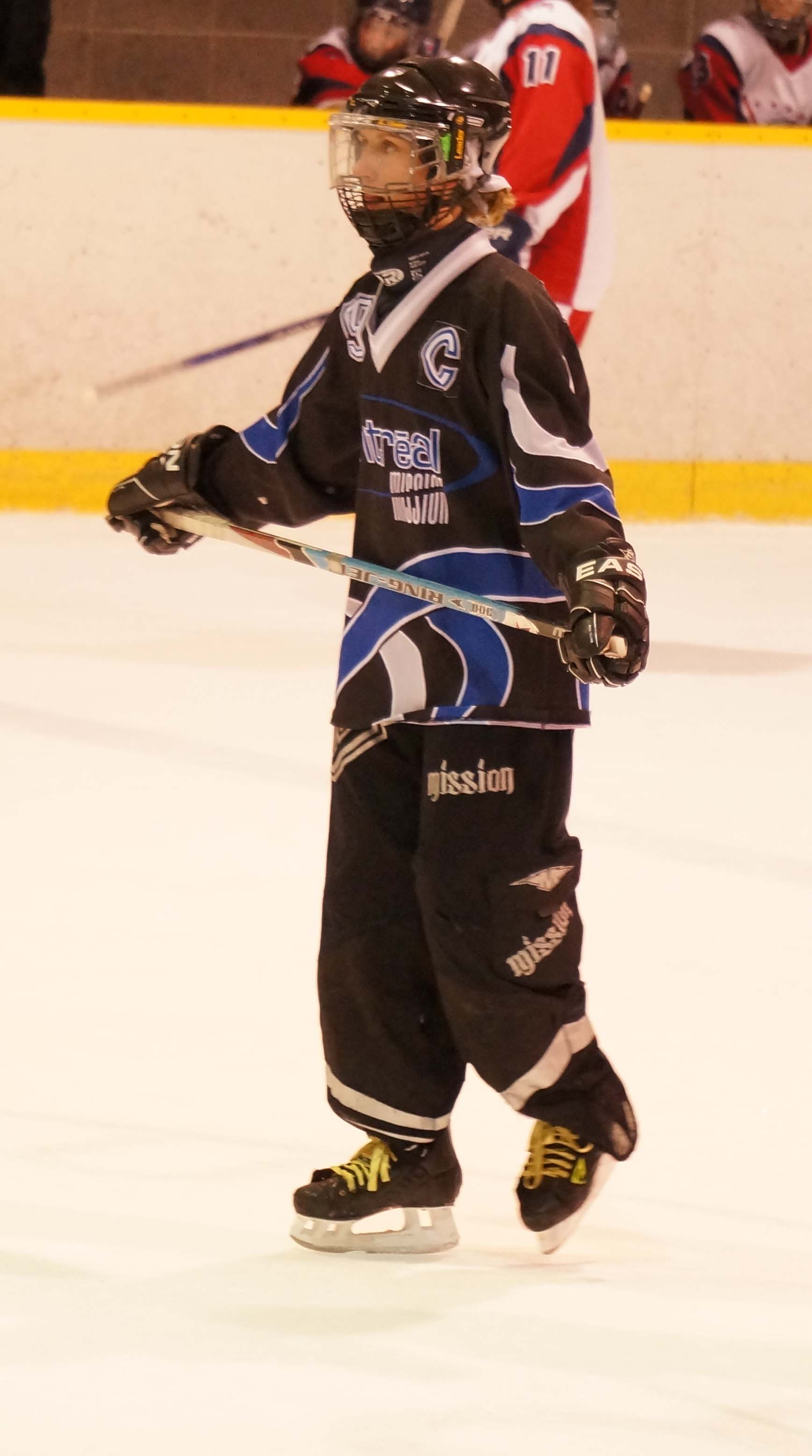
- Blanchette on the ice with the Montreal Mission

Personal information
- Nickname: Juju
- Nationality: Canada
- Born: 9 January 1977 (age 49) Montreal, Quebec, Canada

Sport
- Country: Canada; Finland; World
- Position: Centre
- League: (Canada) National Ringette League; (Finland) SM Ringette
- Team: - Team Canada Sr.; - Team Quebec; - Montreal Mission, (NRL); - (Finland) Ringeten Turun, (Ringeten SM-sarja)
Medal record
Event	1st	2nd	3rd
WRC	0	5	0
CRC	8	1	0
WJRC	0	1	0
QPRC	9	0	0
CWG	0	0	1
Total	17	7	1
Ringette
World Ringette Championships
Representing Canada
Silver medal – second place	2004 Huddinge, Stockholm, Sweden	
Silver medal – second place	2007 Ottawa, Canada	
Silver medal – second place	2010 Tampere, Finland	
Silver medal – second place	2013 North Bay, Canada; Assistant Coach, Team Canada Sr.	
Silver medal – second place	2022 Espoo, Finland; Assistant Coach, Team Canada Sr.	
World Junior Ringette Championships
Representing Canada
Silver medal – second place	2009 Prague, Czech Republic; Assistant Coach, 2009 U19 Team Canada East	
Canadian Provincial Ringette
Quebec Provincial Ringette Championships
Gold medal – first place	1995, 1996, 1997, 1998, 1999, 2000, 2003, 2004, 2005	
Canadian Ringette Championships
Gold medal – first place	8 times	
Silver medal – second place	CRC 2000	
Canada Winter Games
Bronze medal – third place	2007 Canada Winter Games (Coach)	
- Updated on August 28, 2023

Julie Blanchette (born January 9, 1977, in Montreal, Quebec) is an elite level Canadian ringette player who has also worked as a trainer and coach and served as the captain of several ringette teams including Team Canada. Blanchette plays for the Montreal Mission of the National Ringette League and has also been a member of the Canadian national ringette team as both player and coach.

Blanchette was an assistant coach for the 2022 Team Canada Seniors who competed in the 2022 World Ringette Championships and will be the Head coach of Canada's Senior National Team for the 2023 World Ringette Championships as a part of a special senior program created specifically for that tournament.

== Sporting career ==
Blanchette started playing ringette when she was 4 years old. Her brother played ice hockey and her parents looked for a team game for her, eventually signing her up with the local ringette club in Montreal. She played her sport at every amateur level in Montreal and represented Team Quebec in the Canadian Ringette Championships and the Canada Winter Games.

Blanchette played in the Canadian elite semi-professional level of ringette, the National Ringette League, beginning in 2003 for the Montreal Mission. In 2005, she played a season for the club Ringette Turku in the elite ringette league of Finland, SM Ringette (formerly Ringeten SM-sarja).

She was a member of the Canadian national ringette team several times, beginning as a player for the 2004 national ringette team of Canada where she competed in the 2004 World Ringette Championships in Stockholm. She made Team Canada again playing for the 2007 Canadian national ringette team who competed in the 2007 World Ringette Championships in Ottawa.

Her final appearance as a player for Team Canada took place in 2010 where she competed with the 2010 Canadian senior team in the 2010 World Ringette Championships in Tampere. In 2008, she played in the 2008 Ringette World Club Championships in Sault Ste-Marie.

Blanchette served as team captain of the Canadian national ringette team and was also the captain of the National Ringette League's Montreal Mission. She has also worked as a ringette trainer and coach. She was the trainer for the national Team Canada juniors (Under-19 years) during the World Junior Ringette Championships (U19) of 2009 in Prague. In September 2013, Blanchette was named an assistant-coach of Canada's 2013 Senior National Team who competed in the 2013 World Ringette Championships.

Despite women's hockey exploding in popularity, these women say ringette remains their first love. "Ringette has been a life-long passion for me, ever since I was four years old. I don't see myself playing any other sport with this much passion, determination and commitment," said Blanchette.

— "Montreal Mission heads to national ringette championships", CTV News, Montreal, 2012

== Statistics ==
=== Club ===
Season by season
Season	Team	League	Regular season					Playoffs				
Season	Team	League	Games play	Goals	Assists	Points	Penalties	Games play	Goals	Assists	Points	Penalties
2007-08	Montreal Mission	NRL	30	48	78	121	8	-	-	-	-	-
2008-09	Montreal Mission	NRL	31	54	80	134	12	3	1	6	7	4
2009-10	Montreal Mission	NRL	31	59	51	110	12	2	2	3	5	4
2010-11	Montreal Mission	NRL	31	61	80	141	12	7	9	14	31	0
2011-12	Montreal Mission	NRL	27	43	64	107	14					

=== International level ===
Statistics by competition
Year	Event	Games Play	Goals	Assists	Points	+/-	Penalty minutes	Result
2004	World Ringette Championships	n/a	n/a	n/a	n/a	n/a	n/a	Silver
2007	World Ringette Championships	4	5	10	15	-	8	Silver
2008	Ringette World Club Championship	5	10	14	24	-	8	Montreal Mission finished 5th
2010	World Ringette Championships	6	1	8	9	-	0	Silver

== Honours ==
- Won gold nine times in the Quebec Provincial Ringette Championships: 1995, 1996, 1997, 1998, 1999, 2000, 2003, 2004, and 2005.
- Won gold in 8 Canadian Ringette Championships.
- Won silver in the 2000 Canadian Ringette Championships in Prince George, British Columbia.
- Selected to the All-Star ringette team of at the 2000 Canadian Ringette Championships.
- Won silver as a player for Team Canada in the 2004 World Ringette Championships.
- Won silver as a player for Team Canada in the 2007 World Ringette Championships.
- Won bronze as the coach of Team Quebec in the 2007 Canada Winter Games.
- Won silver as the assistant coach of the Canadian junior national ringette team, U19 Team Canada East, at the 2009 World Junior Ringette Championships (U-19) in August 2009 in Prague, Czech Republic.
- Won silver as a player for Team Canada in the 2010 World Ringette Championships.
- Top scorer of the Montreal Mission club and the 2nd top scorer in the history of the National Ringette League in Canada.
- Top Canadian scorer during the 2008 Ringette World Club Championship.
- Top scoring champion for the 2010-11 season in the National Ringette League in Canada with individual stats of 61 goals and 80 assists (for a total of 141 points).
- Selected to the All-Star team during the 2005 Canadian Ringette Championships in Winnipeg.
- Elected an MVP Player for the 2005-06 season and 2008-09 season in the National Ringette League.

== Gallery ==
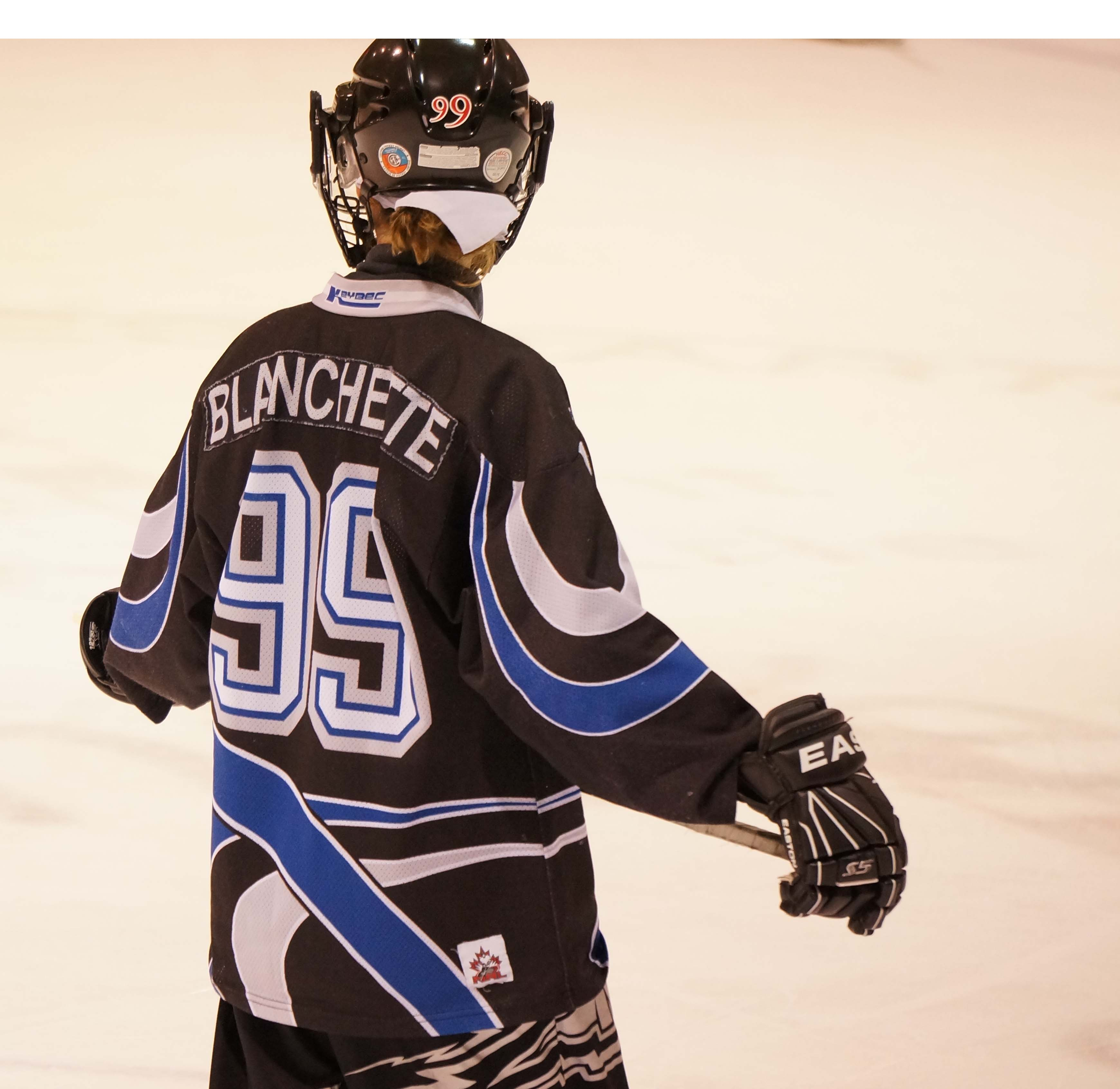
Blanchette with the Montreal Mission, 2012 NRL season

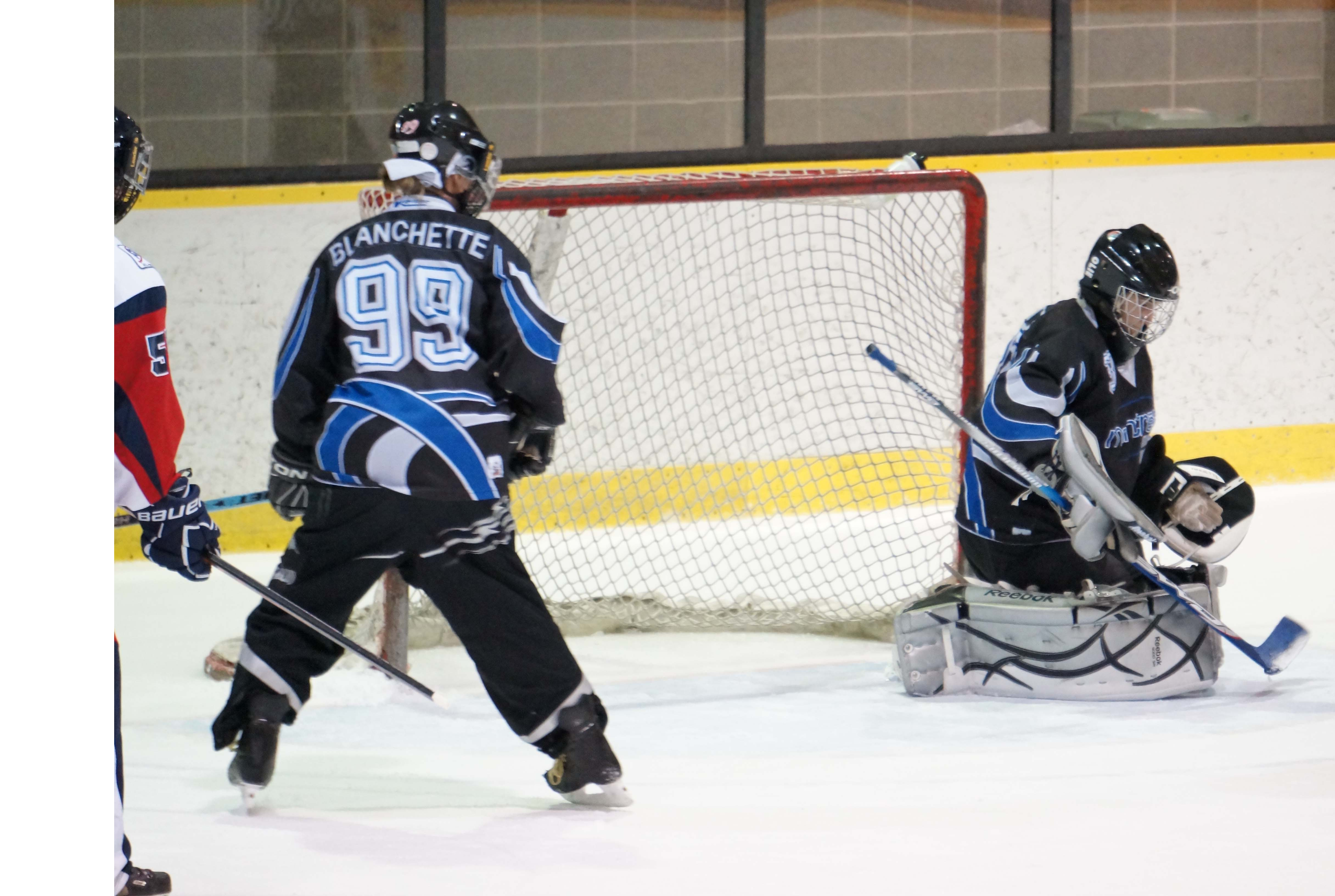
Blanchette with the Montreal Mission, 2012 NRL season

== See also ==
- Montreal Mission
- National Ringette League
- Canada national ringette team
- Keely Brown (goaltender)
- Lyndsay Wheelans
- Shelly Hruska
- Stéphanie Séguin
- Erin Cumpstone
- Jennifer Hartley

== Other websites ==
- Profile of Julie Blanchette for Montreal Mission
- Profile of Julie Blanchette for Canadian National Team
- A ringette star for the West End, The Monitor, April 26, 2007.
