= 2010 World Ringette Championships =

2010 edition of the World Ringette Championships

9th World Ringette Championships

Tournament details
- Host country: Finland
- City: Tampere
- Venue: Tampere Ice Stadium
- Dates: November 1–6, 2010
- Teams: 4

Final positions
- Champions: Finland (4th title)
- Runners-up: Canada
- Third place: United States
- Fourth place: Sweden

The 2010 World Ringette Championships (2010 WRC) was an international ringette tournament and the 9th (IX) World Ringette Championships. The tournament was organized by the International Ringette Federation (IRF) and was contested in Tampere, Finland, between November 1 and November 6, 2010. The main competition took place at the Tampere Ice Stadium. The previous year the 2009 World Junior Ringette Championships took place in Prague, becoming the inaugural event for elite junior ringette athletes. However, it was organized as a separate event from the World Ringette Championships program.

== Overview ==
Participating teams were Team Canada Senior, Team Finland Senior, Team Sweden, and Team USA. The group stage was played in a round-robin series. The finals and bronze medal games were played in a best-of-three playoff format.

== Venue ==
Tampere Ice Stadium
Host venue
Location	Finland – Tampere
Constructed	Opened: 1965; Renovated: 1981, 1990, 2001–2002, 2009, 2014; Expanded: 2007
Capacity	7,800

== Teams ==
2010 WRC Rosters
2010 Team Finland
2010 Team Canada
(United States) 2010 Team USA
2010 Team Sweden

== Group stage ==
November 1, 2010	Finland	13–0	United States	Tampere Ice Stadium

Official Game Report

November 1, 2010	Sweden	0–30	Canada	Tampere Ice Stadium

Official Game Report

November 2, 2010	United States	22–0	Sweden	Tampere Ice Stadium

Official Game Report

November 2, 2010	Canada	8–9	Finland	Tampere Ice Stadium; Attendance: 1,122

Official Game Report

November 3, 2010	Canada	14–4	United States	Tampere Ice Stadium

Official Game Report

November 3, 2010	Finland	34–0	Sweden	Tampere Ice Stadium

Official Game Report

=== Points ===
Team	Pld	W	D	L	GF	GA	GD	Pts
Finland	3	3	0	0	56	8	+48	6
Canada	3	2	0	1	52	13	+39	4
United States	3	1	0	2	26	27	−1	2
Sweden	3	0	0	3	0	86	−86	0

=== Top scorers ===
Rank	Player	Goals	Assists	Points
1	(Finland) Salla Kyhälä	12	6	18
2	(Finland) Marjukka Virta	7	10	17
3	(Finland) Anne Pohjola	4	13	17
4	(Canada) Jennifer Wakefield	7	9	16
5	(Finland) Elina Raesola	12	3	15
6	(Finland) Susanna Tapani	8	6	14
7	(Canada) Victoria Russel	8	5	13
8	(Canada) Jacqueline Gaudet	4	9	13
9	(Canada) Barb Bautista	5	7	12
10	(United States) Catherine Cartier	7	4	11

== Bronze medal games ==
November 4, 2010	United States	20–1 (4–0, 4–0; 3–1, 9–0)	Sweden	Tampere Ice Stadium

Official Game Report

November 5, 2010	Sweden	1–19 (0–6, 0–4, 0–3, 1–6)	United States	Tampere Ice Stadium

Official Game Report

=== Top scorers ===
Rank	Player	Goals	Assists	Points
1	(United States) Catherine Cartier	9	9	18
2	(United States) Jamie Bell	2	10	12
3	(United States) Tiia Juvonen	7	4	11
4	(United States) Dailyn Bell	6	4	10
5	(United States) Chelsea Stone	5	3	8

== Finals ==
November 4, 2010	Finland	6–5 OT (2-1, 1-2, 1-2, 1-0)	Canada	Tampere Ice Stadium; Attendance: 1,538

Official Game Report

November 5, 2010	Canada	3–6 (2-1, 0-1, 0-2, 1-2)	Finland	Tampere Ice Stadium; Attendance: 3,863

Official Game Report

=== Top scorers ===
Rank	Player	Goals	Assists	Points
1	(Finland) Elina Raesola	3	3	6
2	(Finland) Susanna Tapani	2	3	5
3	(Canada) Jennifer Hartley	2	2	4
4	(Finland) Salla Kyhälä	2	1	3
5	(Finland) Anna-Kaisa Raesola	0	3	3

== Final standings ==
	Team
1st place, gold medalist(s)	Team Finland Senior
2nd place, silver medalist(s)	Team Canada Senior
3rd place, bronze medalist(s)	(United States) Team USA Senior
4th	Team Sweden Senior

== Personal awards ==
=== Best players by team ===
- (Canada) Jennifer Hartley
- (Finland) Heidi Ahlberg
- (Sweden) Linda Björling
- (United States) Catherine Cartier

=== All-Star Team ===
- Goalkeeper: (Finland) Heidi Ahlberg
- Defense: (Canada) Beth Hurren
- Defense: (Finland) Jonna Ruotsalainen
- Forward: (Canada) Jennifer Hartley
- Forward: (Finland) Anne Pohjola
- Forward: (Finland) Salla Kyhälä

=== Most Valuable Player ===
- (Finland) Salla Kyhälä

== Rosters ==
=== Team Finland ===
The 2010 Team Finland team included the following:

Number	Name
Forwards
2	Anna-Kaisa Raesola
3	Elina Raesola
4	Marjukka Virta
8	Petra Ojaranta
10	Anne Pohjola
12	Siiri Saarikettu (née Kallionpää)
14	Tiina Mononen
15	Katja Kortesoja
17	Sanna Metsola
18	Kirsi Pukkila
19	Salla Kyhälä
Centres
11	Susanna Tapani
Defence
3	Miia Railio
5	Hannamari Muukkonen
9	Mari Kallio
13	Jessica Tiitola (née Kantee)
16	Annamari Tuokko
20	Jonna Ruotsalainen
21	Maiju Ruotsalainen
Goaltenders
30	Heidi Ahlberg
31	Aura Lehtonen
32	Anna Näkki

Team Staff
Position	Name
Team manager	
Head coach	Virpi Karjalainen
Assistant coach	Kim Forsblom
Trainer	
Trainer	
Trainer	

=== Team Canada ===
Team Canada competed in the 2010 World Ringette Championships. Canada sent 22 athletes. The team included a back up group of athletes who trained as members of the national team in case they were required to participate.

The 2010 Team Canada team included the following:

Number	Name
Forwards
6	Kailee Dundas
14	Andrea Ferguson
18	Jacqueline Gaudet
21	Barb Bautista
66	Stéphanie Séguin
87	Ashley Peters
99	Julie Blanchette
Centres
4	Jennifer Gaudet (Jennifer Wakefield)
12	Victoria Russell
17	Jennifer Hartley
81	Erin Cumpstone
Defence
0	Vanessa Cowlen
3	Dallas Robbins
7	Lindsay Burns
8	Abbey Hoes
19	Colleen Hagan
16	Katie Lugg
24	Jenna McBride
64	Beth Hurren
Goaltenders
1	Keely Brown
30	Bobbi Mattson
31	Meghan Pittaway

Reserves
Name
Allison Cronin
Josée Doiron
Kerith Gordon
Jackie Ho
Sheena MacDonald
Christina Mascherin
Stacey McNichol
Jessica Pepper
Julie Primard

Team Staff
Position	Name
Head coach	Lyndsay Wheelans
Assistant coach	J. Jenson
Assistant coach	Julie Smith
Team Leader / Manager	Tracey Tulloch
Officials
Official	Natalie Fortin

=== Team Sweden ===
The 2010 Sweden Senior team included the following:

Number	Name	Position	Club
Players
1	Linnea Ulfheden		Sollentuna HC
2	Daniella Ramel		Ulriksdals SK
3	Rosanna Joners		Sollentuna HC
4	Elina Jalenius		Ulriksdals SK
6	Anna Norrbom		Ulriksdals SK
10	Anna Näsström		Kista HC
13	Anna Viberth		Ulriksdals SK
15	Angelica Holmberg		Ulriksdals SK
16	Annela Bäckström		Järna SK
17	Jessika Runolf		Sollentuna HC
18	Frida Gauw		Ulriksdals SK
20	Linda Björling		Ulriksdals SK
22	Rebecca Gustafson		Ulriksdals SK
23	Anna Öberg		Sollentuna HC
	Jessica Alakärppä		Turku ringette Finland
	Patricia Alakärppä		Turku ringette Finland

Team Staff
Position	Name
Healthcare/Manager	Anna Gellner
Manager	Sofia Hörberg
Head coach	Dennis Gauw
Assistant coach	Lars Jonsson

=== Team USA ===
The 2010 USA Senior team included the following:

Number	Name
Forwards
3	Krista Reich
4	Jamie Bell – Forward/Centre
9	Tiia Juvonen
12	Evan Brown
16	Stephanie Zimmel
17	Chelsea Stone – Forward/Centre
18	Erin Heming
21	Taru Akesson
Centres
93	Catherine Cartier (Captain)
Defence
2	Lindsay Brown
5	Jackie Williamson
6	Dailyn Bell – Defence/Centre
10	Kacy Hannesson
13	Kari Sadoway
14	Robyn Kerr
19	Ashley Harrison
22	Jody Nouwen – Defence/Centre
Goaltenders
1	Devon Lowe
31	Heather Konkin
35	Katie McNeil

Team Staff
Position	Name
General Manager	Adele Williamson
General Manager	Michelle Brown
Head coach	
Assistant coach	Ralph Bell
Assistant coach	Murray Pettem
Assistant coach	
Trainer	
Trainer	

== See also ==
- World Ringette Championships
- International Ringette Federation
- Canada national ringette team
- Finland national ringette team
- Sweden national ringette team
- United States national ringette team

Preceded by Ottawa 2007	World Ringette Championships; Tampere; 2010 World Ringette Championships	Succeeded by North Bay 2013
