= Stéphanie Séguin =

Canadian ringette player and coach

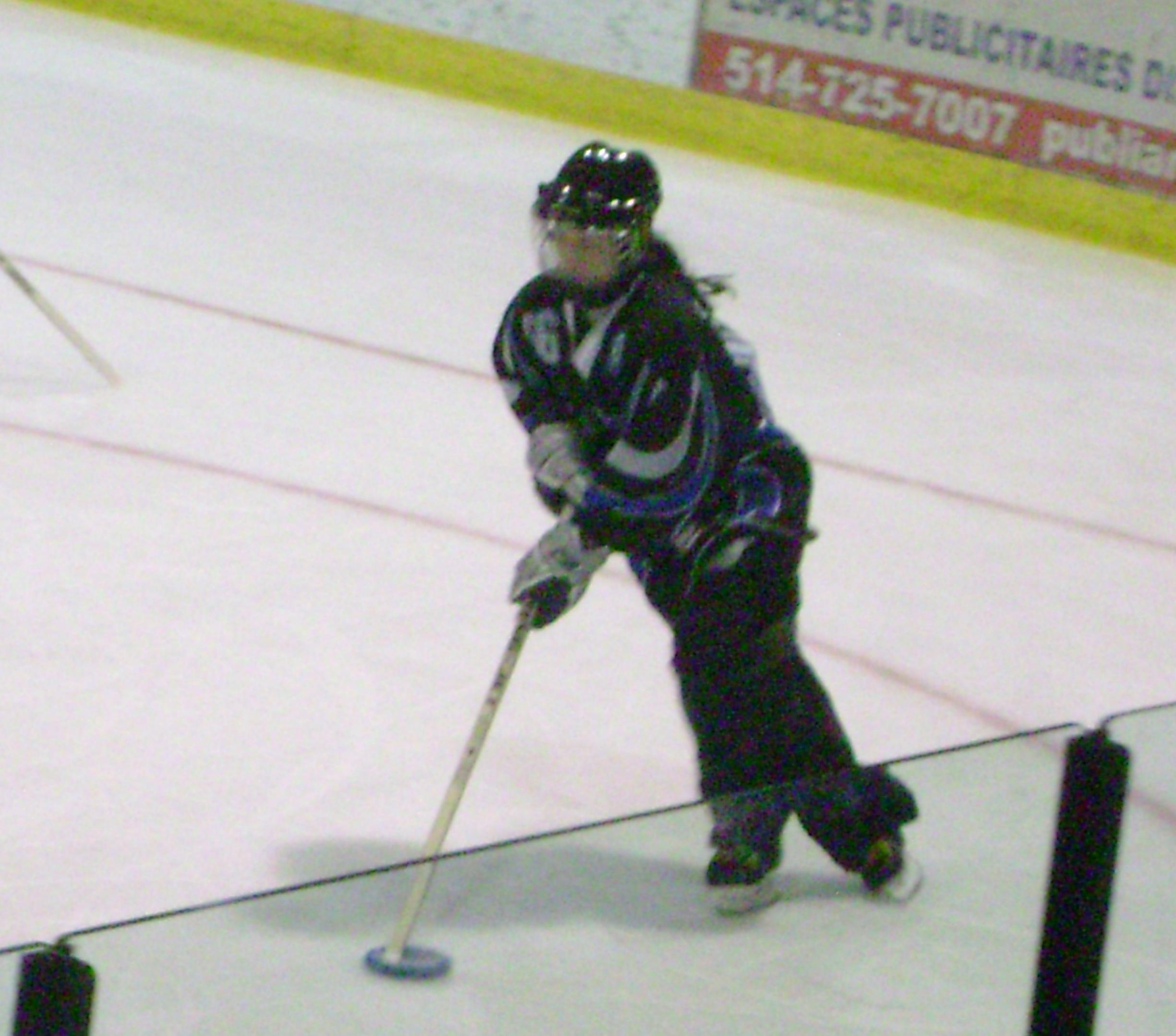
- Séguin playing for the Montreal Mission in 2004

Personal information
- Nationality: Canada
- Born: 23 June 1981 (age 45) St-Laurent (Canada)

Sport
- Country: Canada; Finland; World
- League: (Canada) National Ringette League; (Finland) SM Ringette
- Team: Team Canada Sr.; (Canada) Montreal Mission (NRL); (Finland) Ringeten Turun, SM Ringette
Medal record
| Event | 1st | 2nd | 3rd |
|---|---|---|---|
| WRC | 0 | 4 | 0 |
| RWCC | 0 | 0 | 0 |
| CWG | 0 | 0 | 0 |
| CRC | 1 | 2 | 2 |
| QG | 1 | 0 | 0 |
| Total | 2 | 6 | 2 |
Ringette
World Ringette Championships
Representing Canada
| Silver medal – second place | 2004 Stockholm | |
| Silver medal – second place | 2007 Canada | |
| Silver medal – second place | 2010 Finland | |
| Silver medal – second place | 2013 Canada | |
Canadian Provincial Ringette
Quebec Games
| Gold medal – first place | 1997 | |
Canadian Ringette Championships
- 19 times: Silver: 2 Bronze: 2
| Silver medal – second place | CRC 2000 | |
| Gold medal – first place | CRC 2005 | |
- Updated on August 8, 2023

Stéphanie Séguin (born June 23, 1981, in Saint-Laurent, Quebec) is an elite level Canadian ringette player who competes as a forward. Séguin currently plays for the Montreal Mission in the National Ringette League (NRL). She has been a member of Canada's national ringette team as a player and coach. In 2023, Séguin was an assistant ringette coach for Team Canada Junior (U21) competing in the 2023 World Ringette Championships. She is an assistant coach for Team Canada's senior national team in 2025.

== Career ==
Séguin began playing ringette at the age of 4 watching her mother play ice hockey.

It all started when Séguin was only four years old. She asked her mother, whom she often saw playing ice hockey, if she could play...but not with the boys.

She has been playing with the Montreal Mission in the National Ringette League, the highest level of ringette in Canada, since 2004.

In 2005, together with Julie Blanchette, she left to play a season in the Finland's national semi-professional ringette league, Ringeten SM-sarja, (now called, SM Ringette) for the club, Turun Ringet, in Turku.

Since 2004, she has been a member of Canada's national ringette team. She competed at the 2004 World Ringette Championships in Stockholm, 2007 in Ottawa, 2010 in Tampere, and 2013 in North Bay. She also competed in the 2008 Ringette World Club Championships in Sault Ste. Marie for the Montreal Mission The team won one game and finished in 5th place.

Possessing a certified level 4 instructor license, she is a coach at the National School of Ringette affiliated with Ringette Canada.

She has coached for the Slovakia national ringette team for 2 years (2008-2009) (International Development Project) and participates as a coach in the European Polar Bear Tournament in Prague, Czech Republic.

== Statistics ==
=== Club ===
Statistics per season
| Season | Team | League | Regular season | | | | | Playoff series | | | | |
| Season | Team | League | GP | G | A | Pts | P | GP | G | A | Pts | P |
| 2007-08 | Montréal Mission | NRL | 30 | 31 | 72 | 103 | 12 | - | - | - | - | - |
| 2008-09 | Montréal Mission | NRL | 31 | 47 | 61 | 108 | 22 | 3 | 3 | 3 | 6 | 0 |
| 2009-10 | Montréal Mission | NRL | 31 | 29 | 54 | 83 | 14 | 2 | 3 | 3 | 6 | 0 |
| 2010-11 | Montréal Mission | NRL | 27 | 43 | 52 | 95 | 8 | 7 | 10 | 7 | 17 | 6 |

=== International ===
Statistics per competition
| Year | Event | GP | G | A | Pts | +/- | PIM | Results |
| 2004 | World Ringette Championships | | | | | | | Silver |
| 2007 | World Ringette Championships | 4 | 3 | 7 | 10 | - | 4 | Silver |
| 2008 | Ringette World Club Championship | 5 | 4 | 4 | 8 | - | 10 | Montréal Mission; 5th place |
| 2010 | World Ringette Championships | 5 | 5 | 5 | 10 | - | 0 | Silver |

== Awards ==
- Quebec Games (French: 'Jeux du Québec') in 1997 (gold medalist)
- 1999 Canada Winter Games
- 13 Canadian Ringette Championships as a player
- Gold medalist at the 2005 Canadian Ringette Championship for Team Quebec Junior AA
- Silver medal at the 2000 Canadian Ringette Championship in Prince George, British Columbia
- Silver medal at the 2004 World Ringette Championships
- Silver medal at the 2007 World Ringette Championships
- Silver medal at the 2010 World Ringette Championships
- Silver medal at the 2013 World Ringette Championships

== Individual honours ==
- Member of the All-Star Team at the 2000 Canadian Ringette Championships
- National Ringette League All-Star Team in 2006, 2007, 2008, and 2009.

== Personal life ==
A graduate of the University of Montreal in Kinesiology, Séguin develops sports in schools and in sports-study programs. She works as a coach at the club Montreal Cadet AA (players aged 16 to 18).

== See also ==
- Montréal Mission
- Julie Blanchette
- National Ringette League
- Ringette
