= 2004 World Ringette Championships =

2004 edition of the World Ringette Championships

7th World Ringette Championships

Tournament details
- Host country: Sweden
- City: Huddinge Municipality
- Venue: Visättra SportCenter 1
- Dates: November 23–27, 2004
- Teams: 4

Final positions
- Champions: Finland (2nd title)
- Runners-up: Canada
- Third place: United States
- Fourth place: Sweden

The 2004 World Ringette Championships (2004 WRC) was an international ringette tournament and the 7th (XII) World Ringette Championships. The tournament was organized by the International Ringette Federation (IRF) and was contested in Stockholm, Sweden, between November 23 and 27, 2004. The game for the world title final between Canada and Finland took place at the Visättra SportCenter in Huddinge, Stockholm, Sweden.

== Overview ==
Team Finland took the world championship by crushing Team Canada 9–3 in the final. Since the 2004 World Championships, Finland has dominated the international senior level of ringette. Anna Vanhatalo was elected the best goaltender of the tournament.

== Venue ==
Visättra Sportcenter
Host venue
Location	Sweden – Huddinge, Stockholm
Constructed	
Capacity	

== Teams ==
2004 WRC Rosters
2004 Team Finland
2004 Team Canada
(United States) 2004 Team USA
2004 Team Sweden

== Final standings ==
2004 Final standings
	Team
1st place, gold medalist(s)	Team Finland
2nd place, silver medalist(s)	Team Canada
3rd place, bronze medalist(s)	(United States) Team USA
4th	Team Sweden

== Rosters ==
=== Team Finland ===
The 2004 Team Finland Senior team included the following players:

Pos.	Number	Name
Goalie		Anna Vanhatalo
		Kristiina Heinonen (Captain)
		Sini Lehtonen
		Anna-Kaisa Raesola
		Elina Raesola
		Marjukka Virta
		Maja Koponen
		Erika Blom
		Salla Kyhälä
		Petra Ojaranta
Team Staff
Head coach		Pasi Kataja
Assistant coach

=== Team Canada ===
Team Canada competed in the 2004 World Ringette Championships. The 2004 Team Canada team included the following:

Pos.	Number	Name
Goaltender	1	Keely Brown
Goaltender	31	Leanne Fedor
Goaltender		Stacey McNichol
Forward	3	Danielle (Hobday) Hildebrand - Captain
Forward	4	Jennifer Gaudet (née Wakefield)
Forward	8	Megan Todd
Forward	9	Shelly Hruska
Forward	16	Katie Lugg
Forward	17	Jodi Jensen
Forward	21	Barb Bautista
Forward	41	Sharolyn Wouters
Forward	55	Kim Beach
Defence	64	Beth Hurren
Defence	96	Carly Ross
Defence		Laura Warner - Captain
Forward		Stéphanie Séguin
Defence		Colleen Hagan
Defence		Beth Hurren
Defence		Jill Lange
Defence		Nicole Madsen
Defence		Jenna McBride
Defence		Kendra O'Brien
Defence		Carly Ross
Defence		Alexis Snowdon
Defence		Nadia Tomy
Forward		Julie Blanchette
Forward		Mel Brockman
Forward		Dominique Carrière
Forward		Erin Gray
Forward		Michelle Henry
Forward		Kailee Klemmensen
Forward		Mandy Nordstrom
Team Staff
Head coach		Lorrie Horne
Assistant coach		Lyndsay Wheelans

== See also ==
- World Ringette Championships
- International Ringette Federation
- Canada national ringette team
- Finland national ringette team
- Sweden national ringette team
- United States national ringette team

Preceded by Edmonton 2002	World Ringette Championships; Stockholm; 2004 World Ringette Championships	Succeeded by Ottawa 2007
