= 2007 World Ringette Championships =

2007 edition of the World Ringette Championships

8th World Ringette Championships

Tournament details
- Host country: Canada
- City: Ottawa
- Venue: Ottawa Civic Centre 1
- Dates: October 30–November 3, 2007
- Teams: 4

Final positions
- Champions: Finland (3rd title)
- Runners-up: Canada
- Third place: Sweden
- Fourth place: United States

The 2007 World Ringette Championships (2007 WRC) was an international ringette tournament and the 8th (VIII) of the World Ringette Championships. The tournament was organized by the International Ringette Federation (IRF) and was contested in Ottawa, Canada, between October 30 and November 3, 2007. The competition took place at the Ottawa Civic Centre which has since been renamed, "TD Place Arena" and was broadcast in Canada by Rogers TV.

== Overview ==
The final game between Canada and Finland required an added period of overtime. Finnish player Marjukka Virta tied the game 4–4. Finnish player Anne Pohjola scored the winning overtime goal ending the game 5–4. Finland won the world championship series.

WRC 2016 was the first time Finland beat Canada in a World Ringette Championship final hosted in Canada. It was also the first time Team Sweden won a World Ringette Championship medal (bronze) by beating Team USA 10–9 in overtime.

== Venue ==
TD Place Arena Previously called: Ottawa Civic Centre
Host venue
Location	Canada – Ottawa
Constructed	Broke ground: 1966; Opened: 1967; Renovated: 1992, 2005, 2012–2014; Expanded: 1992
Capacity	9,500 (standard); 10,585 (temporary)

== Teams ==
2007 WRC Rosters
2007 Team Finland
2007 Team Canada
(United States) 2007 Team USA
2007 Team Sweden

== Final standings ==
2007 Final standings
	Team
1st place, gold medalist(s)	Team Finland
2nd place, silver medalist(s)	Team Canada
3rd place, bronze medalist(s)	Team Sweden
4th	(United States) Team USA

== Rosters ==
=== Team Finland ===
The 2007 Team Finland team included the following:

Number	Name
Forwards
3	Elina Raesola
7	Jenni Viinamäki
12	Taija Heimovirta
14	Tiina Mononen
19	Salla Kyhälä
Centres
4	Marjukka Virta
6	Marja Koponen
10	Anne Pohjola
18	Kirsi Pukkila
21	Eevi Kaasinen
22	Riikka Hannukainen
Defence
5	Essi Ylönen
8	Petra Ojaranta
9	Mari Kallio
11	Anu Paalanen
13	Jessica Tiitola (née Kantee)
16	Sini Laiho
17	Tiina Tamminen
20	Jonna Ruotsalainen
Goaltenders
30	Anna Vanhatalo
33	Miina Petäjäniemi
35	Tiina Mäkelä

Team Staff
Position	Name
Team Manager	
Head Coach	Virpi Karjalainen
Assistant Coach	
Trainer	
Trainer	
Trainer	

=== Team Canada ===
Team Canada competed in the 2007 World Ringette Championships. The 2007 Team Canada team included the following:

Number	Name	
Forwards
3	Danielle (Hobday) Hildebrand	
8	Megan Todd	
11	Sheena MacDonald	
18	Jaqueline Gaudet	
21	Barb Bautista	
22	Julie Primard	
44	Sharolyn Wouters	
55	Kim Beach	
66	Stéphanie Séguin	
87	Ashley Peters	
Centres
4	Jennifer Wakefield (née Gaudet)	
9	Carly Ross	
12	Jill Lange	
93	Catherine Cartier	
99	Julie Blanchette	
Defence
2	Stefanie McArdle	
15	Michelle MacKay	
18	Jacqueline Gaudet	
19	Colleen Hagan	
82	Mel Brockman	
Goaltenders
1	Keely Brown	
37	Shannon Anderson	
53	Stacey McNichol	
Reserves
Number	Name	Position
	Sjaane Beattie	Forward
	Katie Lugg	Forward
	Dominique Privé	Forward
	Melanie Thomas	Forward
	Jennifer Hartley	Centre
	Beth Hurren	Centre
	Kerith Gordon	Defence
	Kendra O'Brian	Defence
	Karen Stafford	Defence
	Claudia Jetté	Goalkeeper

Team Staff
Position	Name
Head Coach	Lyndsay Wheelans
Assistant Coach	Marion Clark
Assistant Coach	Tracy Townsend
Manager	Julie Smith
Athletic Therapist	Connie Klassen
Mental Skills Coach	Blair Whitmarsh

=== Team Sweden ===
The 2007 Team Sweden Senior team included the following:

Number	Name	Club
Forwards
3	Rosanna Joners	Sollentuna HC
4	Elina Jalenius	Ulriksdals SK
6	Ida Sundström	Sollentuna HC
7	Ida Öberg	Sollentuna HC
11	Jonna Yrjölä	Sollentuna HC
12	Emma-Lotta Laine	Segeltorps IF
15	Sofia Hörberg	Sollentuna HC
20	Linda Björling	Ulriksdals SK
24	Ida-Maria Mullo (Assistant Captain)	Kista HC Ringette
Defence
5	Julia Hjelmström	Segeltorps IF
9	Matilda Linse	Sollentuna HC
10	Anna Näsström	Sollentuna HC
13	Anna Viberth	Ulriksdals SK
14	Caroline Fluch (Captain)	Segeltorps IF
16	Ellen Hallerth	Sollentuna HC
22	Sofia Lundgren (Assistant Captain)	Sollentuna HC
Goaltenders
1	Hannah Boman (MVP)	Kista HC Ringette

Team Staff
Position	Name
Manager	Boman Pekka
Head Coach	Kallio Tuomas
Assistant Coach	Runolf Jimmy
Trainer	Näsström Ulf
Trainer	Andersson Katrin

=== Team USA ===
The 2007 USA Senior team included the following:

Number	Name
Forwards
3	Deja Leonard
4	Erin Heming
5	Lindsey Giordano
13	Natasha Stalany
16	Jesse Penner
17	Kenzie Field
18	Carly Hara
55	Allison Biewald
Centres
2	Brooke Robertson
Defence
6	Lynita White
7	Victoria Giordano
8	Saara Harju
9	Yafa Elseri
12	Stephanie Reid
14	Adrienne Thompson
Goaltenders
1	Brittany Coulter
31	Devon Lowe

== See also ==
- World Ringette Championships
- International Ringette Federation
- Canada national ringette team
- Finland national ringette team
- Sweden national ringette team
- United States national ringette team

Preceded by Stockholm 2004	World Ringette Championships; Ottawa; 2007 World Ringette Championships	Succeeded by Tampere 2010
