= Canada national ringette team =

Girl's and women's national ringette teams representing Canada

Canada
- The Maple Leaf has always appeared on the uniform since 1990.
- Nickname: Team Canada (Équipe Canada)
- Association: Ringette Canada
- Head coach: Team Canada Sr.; Julie Blanchette (2023): Team Canada Jr.; Andrea Ferguson (2023)
- Assistants: Team Canada Sr. (2023); Jacqueline Gaudet; Stéphanie Séguin; Barb Bautista; Claudia Jetté; Team Canada Jr. U21 (2023); Keely Brown; Colleen Hagan; Donnell Schoenhofen
- Captain: Team Canada Sr.; (2023); Team Canada Jr. U21; Erin Ung (2023)
- Team colors: White, red, black
Home colours	Away colours	Third colours

First international
- Senior: Canada 19–0 Sweden (Stockholm, Sweden; April 14, 1996) Junior: Canada 14–8 (United States) USA (North Bay, Ontario, Canada; January 1, 2014)

World Ringette Championships
- Appearances: Junior: 6 (first in 2009) Senior: 14 including 1998 Summit Series (first in 1990)
- Best result: (gold) Senior: 1st; 1990, 1992, 1996, 2002; (gold) Junior: 1st; 2012, 2013, 2016, 2017, 2019

Medal record

World Ringette Championships

Seniors
Gold medal – first place	1990 Gloucester	Team (Alberta)
Silver medal – second place	1990 Gloucester	Team (Ontario)
Bronze medal – third place	1990 Gloucester	Team (Quebec)
Gold medal – first place	1992 Helsinki	Team (Canada West)
Silver medal – second place	1992 Helsinki	Team (Canada East)
Silver medal – second place	1994 Saint Paul	Team (Canada East)
Bronze medal – third place	1994 Saint Paul	Team (Canada West)
Gold medal – first place	1996 Stockholm	Team
Silver medal – second place	1998 Summit Series; Turku, Gothenburg, Osnabruck, Colmar	Team
Silver medal – second place	2000 Espoo and Lahti	Team
Gold medal – first place	2002 Edmonton	Team
Silver medal – second place	2004 Stockholm	Team
Silver medal – second place	2007 Ottawa	Team
Silver medal – second place	2010 Tampere	Team
Silver medal – second place	2013 North Bay	Team
Silver medal – second place	2016 Helsinki	Team
Silver medal – second place	2017 Mississauga	Team
Silver medal – second place	2019 Burnaby	Team
	2021 Helsinki	Cancelled
Silver medal – second place	2022 Espoo	Team
	2023 Calgary	Team

World Junior Ringette Championships

Juniors
Silver medal – second place	2009 Prague	Team (Canada East)
Gold medal – first place	2012 London	Team (Canada East)
Bronze medal – third place	2012 London	Team (Canada West)

World Ringette Championships

Juniors
Silver medal – second place	2013 North Bay	Team
Gold medal – first place	2016 Tampere	Team
Gold medal – first place	2017 Mississauga	Team
Gold medal – first place	2019 Burnaby	Team
	2021 Helsinki	Cancelled
Silver medal – second place	2022 Espoo	Team
	2023 Calgary	Team

The Canada national ringette team (popularly known as Team Canada; French: Équipe Canada) is the ringette team representing Canada internationally. Canada has both a senior national team, Team Canada Senior, and a junior national team, Team Canada Junior. Both national teams compete in the World Ringette Championships (WRC) and are overseen by Ringette Canada which is a member of the International Ringette Federation (IRF). Some team members are selected from the National Ringette League. Team Canada and Team Finland have emerged as ringette's major international rivals at both the senior and junior level. Some of Canada's national teams have been inducted into the Ringette Canada Hall of Fame.

Canada's first appearance in international ringette began at the inaugural World Ringette Championships which was the 1990 World Ringette Championships, when Canada sent six different regional teams from across the country to represent the nation. At that time, Canada had not yet established a national team, and rather, regional teams competed for the championship instead. Team Alberta, which was composed of members of the province's Calgary Debs who were all-star players from across Alberta, emerged victorious from the tournament.

Canada achieved its first unified national ringette team in the 1996 World Ringette Championships. This was a significant milestone for the sport, as it marked the first time that only one team represented the nation in international ringette competitions. Previously, regional teams, like Team Alberta, represented Canada in international tournaments. The formation of this national team paved the way for greater standardization in the sport and allowed Canada to bring its best players together to compete on the world stage. The Canadian national ringette team has since become a dominant force in international ringette competitions, winning several gold medals in the World Ringette Championships.

The next time Canada competed was at the 1998 Summit Series where both Team Canada Senior and Team Finland Senior competed exclusively in a European tour.

The 2009 World Junior Ringette Championships was the first-ever international tournament exclusively for junior ringette players and took place in Prague, Czech Republic. Two different teams represented the country: Canada East, and Canada West. This marked another important moment in the history of the sport, as it was the first time that nations specifically competed against each other with their best young players, all of whom were U19 (Under-19). Later, the junior tournament merged with the senior tournament at the 2013 World Ringette Championships during the 50th anniversary of the sport. That same year, Canada established its first-ever all-junior national ringette team, taking the opportunity to send upcoming players to the merged junior-senior tournament. The creation of the all-junior team allowed Canada to continue its tradition of success in the international scene and also provided a pathway for young players to represent their country on a global stage.

== Early history ==
Canada was initially represented by six different amateur ringette teams at the inaugural World Ringette Championships in 1990 which took place in Gloucester, Ontario, Canada. In 1996, Canada's national ringette team became the first single representative Canadian team for ringette internationally, forming roughly 15 years after the death of Sam Jacks in 1975, the Canadian identified as the sport's inventor.

Until 2009, Canada only had world representation in ringette at the senior level due to the fact that it was the only level available for elite international ringette competition. Canada created two teams which formed in 2009 for the inaugural World Junior Ringette Championships in the Czech Republic, but Canada wouldn't form its first, single representative all-junior national team until 2013.

== World Championship record ==
=== Summit Series ===
The 1998 World Ringette Championships were replaced by a Summit Series between Team Canada and Team Finland, both of which were senior teams. Team Canada finished in second place while Team Finland finished in first.

=== Senior Canada ===
(Seniors) World Ringette Championships
Year	Location	Result	Notes
1990	(Canada) Gloucester	Gold	
1992	(Finland) Helsinki	Gold	
1994	(United States) Saint Paul	Silver	
1996	(Sweden) Stockholm	Gold	
1998 "Summit Series"	(Finland) Turku (Sweden) Gothenburg (Germany) Osnabrück (France) Colmar	Silver	
2000	(Finland) Espoo and Lahti	Silver	
2002	(Canada) Edmonton	Gold	
2004	(Sweden) Stockholm	Silver	
2007	(Canada) Ottawa	Silver	
2010	(Finland) Tampere	Silver	
2013	(Canada) North Bay	Silver	
2016	(Finland) Helsinki	Silver	
2017	(Canada) Mississauga	Silver	
2019	(Canada) Burnaby	Silver	
2021	(Finland) Helsinki	cancelled	
2022	(Finland) Espoo	Silver	

=== Junior Canada ===
(Juniors) World Ringette Championships
Year	Location	Result	Notes
2009	(Czech Republic) Prague	Silver	
2012	(Canada) London	Gold	
2013	(United States) Saint Paul	Silver	
2016	(Sweden) Stockholm	Gold	
2017	(Canada) Mississauga	Gold	
2019	(Canada) Burnaby	Gold	
2021	(Finland) Helsinki	cancelled	
2022	(Finland) Espoo	Silver	

== Team Canada Senior ==
Canada's first appearance in international ringette took place at the first World Ringette Championships in 1990 with six different Canadian senior amateur ringette teams representing the country: Team Alberta (Calgary Debs), Team Ontario, Team Quebec, Team Manitoba, Team Saskatchewan, and Team Gloucester (host). The winners of the 1989 Western Canadian Ringette Championships, the Calgary Debs advanced to the first World Ringette Championships in 1990 as Team Alberta. The team went on to become the first to win the World Ringette Championship and the Sam Jacks Trophy. Clémence Duchesneau was named the tournament's top goalie, an award she also claimed at the next tournament.

Canada was represented by two separate teams, Team Canada East and Team Canada West, during the 1992 World Ringette Championships and the 1994 World Ringette Championships. Since the 1996 World Ringette Championships only one national Canadian team has served as the Canadian senior representative; it has won the competition twice, in 1996 and in 2002.

== Team Canada Junior ==
Team Canada Junior first competed in the World Junior Ringette Championships. The 2009 World Junior Ringette Championships marked the first time an international competition took place specifically for junior players between ringette playing nations. The tournament was created separately from the major competition between senior national teams (the World Ringette Championships) and was established by the International Ringette Federation.

In 2009, Canada was represented by two different Canadian junior amateur ringette teams, Team Canada East and Team Canada West. At the 2012 World Junior Ringette Championships, Canada was represented by two separate teams: Team Canada East Under-19, and Team Canada West Under-19.

The first single representative national junior ringette team in Canada was formed in 2013 after the World Junior Ringette Championships tournament merged with the larger World Ringette Championships and a Junior division was created.

Due to the COVID-19 pandemic, the 2021 World Ringette Championships were cancelled and therefore there was no Team Canada Junior for that year.

== Medal record ==
=== Senior medal record ===
In conjunction with a gold medal, the winning senior national ringette team is awarded the Sam Jacks Trophy which was first introduced at the world inaugural World Ringette Championships (WRC) in 1990 in Gloucester, Ontario, Canada. A new redesign of the Sam Jacks Trophy was introduced during the 1996 World Ringette Championships in Stockholm, Sweden. 1996 was the year Canada sent the first all–Canadian national ringette team to the WRC whereas before Canada had sent regional teams.

Senior Team Canada WRC Medals (1990–1994)
Year	Gold (gold) 2 (Sam Jacks Trophy)	Silver (silver) 3	Bronze (bronze) 2
1990 Details	(Canada) Team Alberta (Calgary Debs)	(Canada) Team Ontario	Team Quebec
1992 Details	Team Canada West (Team Alberta "AAA")	Team Canada East	
1994 Details		Team Canada East	Team Canada West
Senior Team Canada WRC Medals (1996–2022)
Year	Gold (gold) 2 (Sam Jacks Trophy)	Silver (silver) 10	Bronze (bronze) 0
1996 Details	1996 Team Canada		
1998 Details		1998 Team Canada	
2000 Details		2000 Team Canada	
2002 Details	2002 Team Canada		
2004 Details		2004 Team Canada	
2007 Details		2007 Team Canada	
2010 Details		2010 Team Canada	
2013 Details		2013 Team Canada Senior	
2016 Details		2016 Team Canada Senior	
2017 Details		2017 Team Canada Senior	
2019 Details		2019 Team Canada	
2021 Details	cancelled due to COVID-19 pandemic		
2022 Details		2022 Team Canada	
2023 Details			

=== Junior medal record ===
In conjunction with a gold medal, the winning junior national ringette team is awarded the Juuso Wahlsten Trophy which was first introduced during the 2019 World Ringette Championships (WRC) in Burnaby, Canada. 2013 was the year Canada sent the first all–Canadian junior national ringette team to the WRC whereas before Canada had sent regional teams to the World Junior Ringette Championships (WJRC) in 2009 and 2012, after which the tournament merged with the WRC.

Junior Team Canada WJRC Medals (2009–2012)
Year	Gold (gold) 4 (World Junior Championship Trophy)	Silver (silver) 2	Bronze (bronze) 1
2009 Details		U19 Team Canada East	
2012 Details	U19 Team Canada East		U19 Team Canada West
Junior Team Canada WRC Medals (2013–present)
Year	Gold (gold) 3 (Juuso Wahlsten Trophy)	Silver (silver) 2	Bronze (bronze) 0
2013 Details		Team Canada U19	
2016 Details	Team Canada U19		
2017 Details	Team Canada U19		
2019 Details	Team Canada U19		
2021 Details	cancelled due to COVID-19 pandemic		
2022 Details		Team Canada U21	
2023 Details			

== Notable people ==
=== Players ===
- Keely Brown
- Julie Blanchette
- Lyndsay Wheelans
- Stéphanie Séguin
- Shelly Hruska
- Erin Cumpstone
- Jennifer Hartley
- Claudia Jetté - goalie, goalie coach, played for the Montréal Mission of the National Ringette League for 13 years, played in the Finnish national ringette league for Team Helsinki in Finland in 2006, 18 Canadian Ringette Championships, played for Team Canada 2007 (Sr.) at WRC 2007, goalie coach for Team Canada Juniors 2016 (gold medal), coach for one of the Team Canada Senior teams at the 2023 World Ringette Championships

=== Samuel Perry Jacks ===
Samuel Perry Jacks, commonly known as Sam Jacks, is the Canadian who created the sport of ringette. Ringette's preeminent international award for ringette athletes, the World Ringette Championships, Sam Jacks Trophy, is awarded to the winning team in the Senior Pool and is named in his honour.

=== Mirl Arthur McCarthy ===
Mirl Arthur McCarthy, commonly known as "Red", was the Canadian responsible for designing ringette's first set of official rules.

== Team Canada goalies ==
Below is a list of ringette goalies who have been members of Canada's national ringette team or a have been goalies for one of the regional Canadian ringette teams at the World Ringette Championships.

SENIORS

- Deb Marek
- Anne Gillespie
- Sandra Fenton
- Tamara Anderson
- Clémence Duchesneau
- Amanda Snell
- Keely Brown
- Leanne Fedor
- Shannon Anderson
- Stacey McNicho
- Claudia Jetté - Reserve
- Bobbi Mattson
- Meghan Pittaway
- Stacey McNichol - Reserve
- Amy Clarkson
- Jasmine Leblanc
- Breanna Beck
- Laurie St-Pierre

JUNIORS (U19/U21)

- Ashley Miller
- Élizabeth Audette-Bourdeau
- Kassy Bailey
- Elise Crocker
- Jessie Callander
- Jasmine LeBlanc
- Karly McMullen
- Stacey Bjornsson
- Anj Grewal
- Lynn Seraphim
- Sydney Catlin
- Sarah Brown
- Rianne Munro
- Ellen Hoban
- Ryann Bannerman
- Madison Ford
- Laurie St-Pierre
- Grace MacKenzie
- Marie-Ève Dubé
- Kiana Heska
- Holland Kozan
- Rachael Pelisek
- Paige Roy
- Kaylee Davies
- Maddy Nystrom

U18 DEVELOPMENT

- Julia Harvie
- Aeva Lott
- Cadence Howe
- Annabelle Sylvestre

== Gallery ==
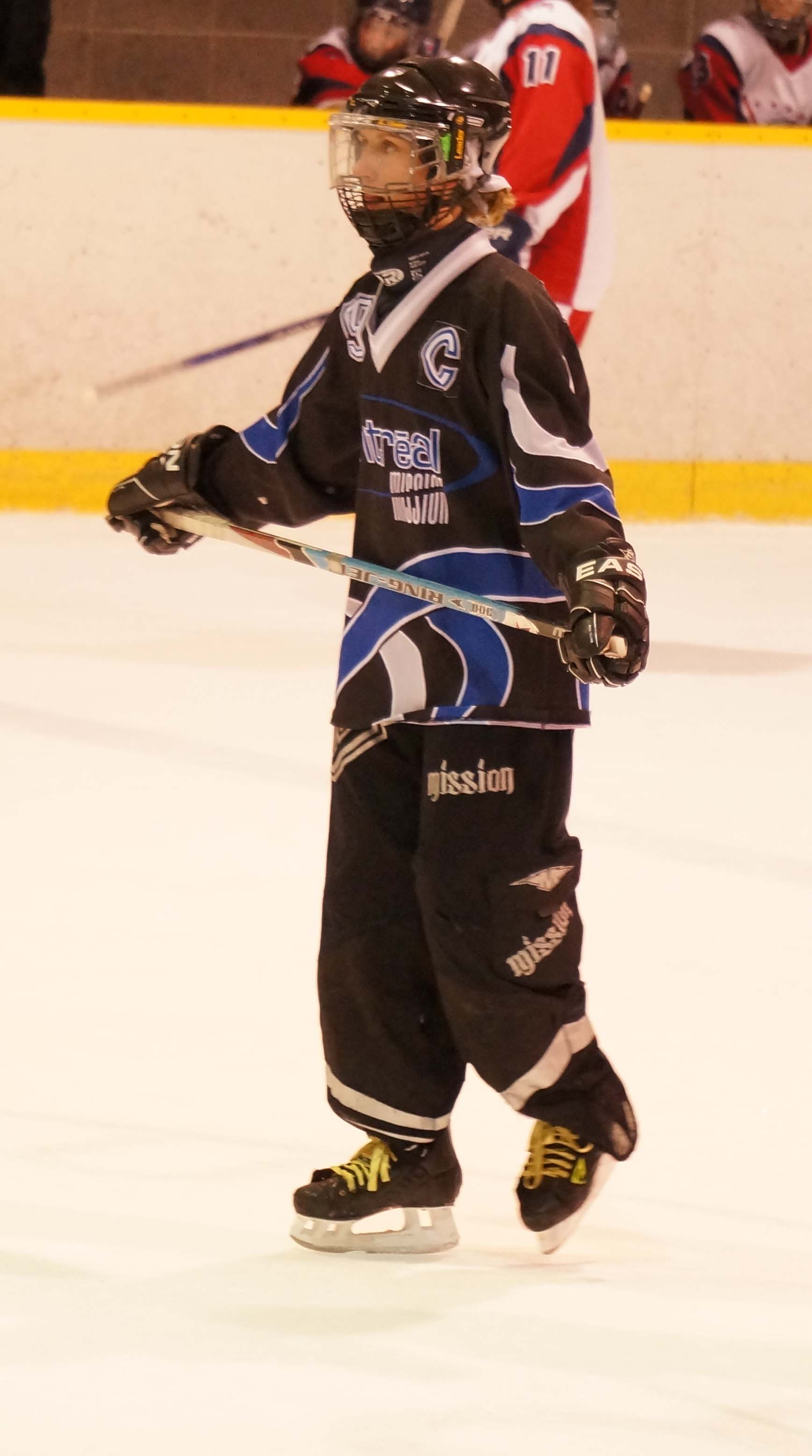
Julie Blanchette, former Team Canada player

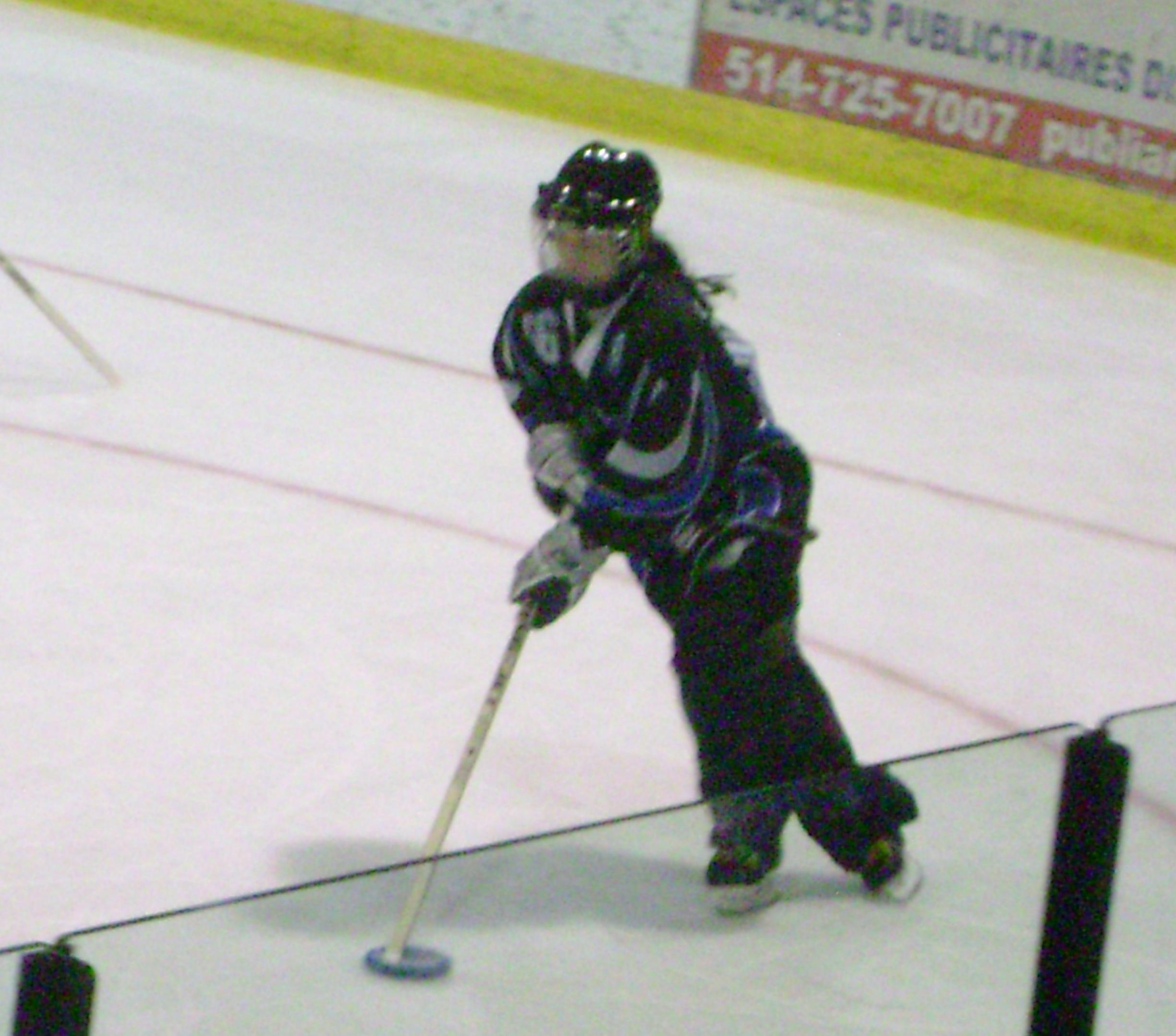
Stéphanie Séguin, former Team Canada player

== See also ==
- Ringette
- Ringette in Canada
- World Ringette Championships
  - Finland national ringette team
  - United States national ringette team
  - Sweden national ringette team
  - Czech Republic national ringette team
- International Ringette Federation
- Sam Jacks
- Juhani "Juuso" Wahlsten
- National Ringette League
