= 1996 World Ringette Championships =

1996 edition of the World Ringette Championships

4th World Ringette Championships

Tournament details
- Host country: Sweden
- City: Stockholm
- Dates: April 15–20, 1996
- Teams: 4

Final positions
- Champions: Canada (1st title)
- Runners-up: Finland
- Third place: United States
- Fourth place: Sweden

The 1996 World Ringette Championship (1996 WRC) was an international ringette tournament and the 4th (IX) World Ringette Championships. The tournament was organized by the International Ringette Federation (IRF) and was contested in Stockholm, Sweden, from April 15 to 20, 1996. WRC 1996 was the first time all competing teams represented individual nations with Canada creating its first, singular, all-Canadian team.

== Overview ==
Team Canada won the gold medal beating Team Finland 6–5 in extra time. Team Canada took home the gold and the Sam Jacks Trophy, the first year the updated design of the trophy was awarded.

== Venue ==
The tournament was contested in Stockholm, Sweden.

== Teams ==
1996 WRC Rosters
1996 Team Finland
1996 Team Canada
(United States) 1996 Team USA
1996 Team Sweden

== Final standings ==
	Team
1st place, gold medalist(s)	Team Canada
2nd place, silver medalist(s)	Team Finland
3rd place, bronze medalist(s)	(United States) Team USA
4th	Team Sweden

== Rosters ==
=== Team Finland ===
The 1996 Team Finland Senior team competed at the 1996 WRC. Petra Ojaranta was present.

=== Team Canada ===
The 1996 Team Canada Senior team became Canada's first official national ringette team and competed in the 1996 World Ringette Championships. It was the first time Canada sent only one ringette team to represent the nation and was technically the first Team Canada in ringette history.

The 1996 Team Canada team included the following:

Name
Tamara Anderson - Goaltender
Jennifer Wood
Lisa Brown (Captain)
Maria (McKenzie) Thompson
Michelle Ethier
Jeanette Cook
Heather Gregg
Jacinda Chomik
Jennifer (Willan) Krochak
Laura Warner
Michelle MacKinnon
Tawny Lipinski
Shelley Potter
Tracy Crowe
Shelley Reynolds
Kari Sadoway
Jennifer Rogers
Leanne Fedor
Kara Eriksen
Carly Ross
Team Staff
Head coach	Lyndsay Wheelans
Assistant coach	Phyllis Sadoway
Assistant coach	Deb Marek
Mental skills coach	Blair Whitmarsh
Trainer	Lorrie Horne
Manager	Warren Hannay
Manager	Kim Arndt

== See also ==
- World Ringette Championships
- International Ringette Federation
- Canada national ringette team
- Finland national ringette team
- Sweden national ringette team
- United States national ringette team

Preceded by Saint Paul 1994	World Ringette Championships; Stockholm; 1996 World Ringette Championships	Succeeded by Espoo and Lahti 2000
