= 2013 World Ringette Championships =

2013 edition of the World Ringette Championships

10th World Ringette Championships

Tournament details
- Host country: Canada
- City: North Bay, Ontario
- Venue: North Bay Memorial Gardens
- Dates: December 31, 2013 – January 4, 2014
- Teams: 6

Final positions
- Champions: Senior Pool; Sam Jacks Series: Finland (Sr.) (5th title) Junior Pool; Finland (Jr.) (1st title) President's Pool Finland (Jr.)
- Runners-up: Senior Pool; Sam Jacks Series: Canada (Sr.) Junior Pool; Canada (Jr.) President's Pool Canada (Jr.)
- Third place: President's Pool United States (Sr.)

The 2013 World Ringette Championships (2013 WRC) was an international ringette tournament and the 10th (X) World Ringette Championships. The tournament was organized by the International Ringette Federation (IRF)and was contested in North Bay, Ontario, Canada, between 31 December 2013, and 4 January 2014. The main competition took place at the North Bay Memorial Gardens.

WRC 2013 was the first time the World Junior Ringette Championships, known as the U19 World Ringette Championship, was added to the program after it had initially begun as a separate tournament. The previous year the 2012 World Junior Ringette Championships took place for elite junior ringette athletes but was organized as separate event from the World Ringette Championships program.

== Overview ==
Team Canada Senior and Team Finland Senior competed against each other in a best of three series. Team Sweden, Team USA, Team Canada U19, and Team Finland U19 competed in the President's Pool and for the U19 (Under-19) world title.

=== Sam Jacks Series ===
Team Canada Senior and Team Finland Senior competed for the World Championship title in the Senior competition called the "Sam Jacks Series", named after Sam Jacks, the inventor of ringette. The series was played in a best-of-three playoff format. The winner of the Senior division, Team Finland Senior, claimed the Sam Jacks Trophy.

=== Presidents' Pool and U19 World Ringette Championship ===
Team Sweden, Team USA, Team Canada U19 and Team Finland U19 competed in the Presidents' Pool. It was played in a round-robin series with the top team claiming the President's Trophy.

Team Sweden and Team USA also played for the World Ringette Championship bronze medal. Team Canada U19 and Team Finland U19 played for the U19 World Championship title.

== Venue ==
North Bay Memorial Gardens
Host venue
Location	Canada – North Bay, Ontario
Constructed	Broke ground: 1954; Opened: 1955; Renovated: 2013
Capacity	4,246

== Teams ==
Senior Pool (Sam Jacks Series)	Junior Pool	President's Pool
2013 Team Finland Senior	2013 Team Finland Junior (U19)	2013 Team Sweden Senior
2013 Team Canada Senior	2013 Team Canada Junior (U19)	(United States) 2013 Team USA Senior
(United States) 2013 Team USA Senior		2013 Team Finland Junior (U19)
2013 Team Sweden Senior		2013 Team Canada Junior (U19)

== Game results ==
=== Sam Jacks Series ===
The "Sam Jacks Series" was the name of the 2013 WRC Senior Pool.

2 January 2013	Finland	8–4 (2–1, 2–1, 1–1, 2–1)	Canada	North Bay Memorial Gardens

3 January 2013	Canada	5–7 (2–0, 0–3; 1–2, 2–2)	Finland	North Bay Memorial Gardens

==== Top scorers ====
Rank	Player	Goals	Assists	Points
1	(Finland) Marjukka Virta	4	2	6
2	(Finland) Anne Pohjola	3	3	6
3	(Canada) Ainsley Ferguson	3	1	4
4	(Finland) Kirsi Pukkila	3	1	4
5	(Finland) Riikka Häyrinen	2	2	4

=== Presidents' Pool ===
31 December 2013	Finland U19	28–1	Sweden	North Bay Memorial Gardens

1 January 2014	Canada U19	14–8	United States	North Bay Memorial Gardens

Game reference

2 January 2014	United States	2–12	Finland U19	North Bay Memorial Gardens

2 January 2014	Sweden	2–14	Canada U19	North Bay Memorial Gardens

3 January 2014	United States	12–3	Sweden	North Bay Memorial Gardens

3 January 2014	Canada U19	4–9	Finland U19	North Bay Memorial Gardens

==== Points ====
Team	Pld	W	D	L	GF	GA	GD	Pts
Finland U19	3	3	0	0	49	7	+42	6
Canada U19	3	2	0	1	32	19	+13	4
United States Seniors	3	1	0	2	22	29	−7	2
Sweden Seniors	3	0	0	3	6	54	−48	0

=== Bronze Medal Game ===
4 January 2014	Sweden	6–21	(United States) USA	North Bay Memorial Gardens

=== U19 World Championship ===
The U19 World Championship title game resulted in a win for the Finland Juniors (U19).

4 January 2014	Finland U19	6–4	Canada U19	North Bay Memorial Gardens

Game reference

== Final standings ==
=== Senior Pool results ===
The Senior Pool competition, also known as the "Sam Jacks Series", was a three-game series between Team Canada Senior and Team Finland Senior. Team Finland Senior won the Sam Jacks Series 2–0 and was rewarded with the gold medal and the Sam Jacks Trophy. Team USA defeated Team Sweden to claim the bronze.

	Team
1st place, gold medalist(s)	Team Finland Senior
2nd place, silver medalist(s)	Team Canada Senior
3rd place, bronze medalist(s)	(United States) Team USA Senior
4th	Team Sweden Senior

=== Junior Pool results ===
The Junior Pool competition was a three-game series between Team Canada Junior and Team Finland Junior. Finland won the U19 World Championship title.

	Team
1st place, gold medalist(s)	Team Finland Junior (U19)
2nd place, silver medalist(s)	Team Canada Junior (U19)

=== President's Pool results ===
The President's Pool involved junior (U19) athletes from Team Canada Junior and Team Finland Junior competing with the developing ringette countries. The winning team, Finland U19, was rewarded with a gold medal and the President's Trophy.

	Team
1st place, gold medalist(s)	Team Finland Junior (U19)
2nd place, silver medalist(s)	Team Canada Junior (U19)
3rd place, bronze medalist(s)	(United States) Team USA Senior
4th	Team Sweden Senior

== Rosters ==
=== Seniors ===
==== Team Finland Senior ====
The 2013 Team Finland Senior team included the following:

FINLAND SENIOR
Number	Name
Forwards
12	Siiri Saarikettu (née Kallionpä)
14	Tiina Mononen
15	Riikka Häyrinen
17	Kati Koskelin
Centres
4	Marjukka Virta
5	Tanja Eloranta
7	Jenni Viinamäki
10	Anne Pohjola
18	Kirsi Pukkila
19	Salla Kyhälä
Defence
2	Hanna Ropanen
3	Nelly Ylitalo
6	Miia Railio
13	Jessica Tiitola (née Kantee)
16	Annamari Tuokko
21	Mira Sydänmaa
Goaltenders
30	Maria Perkkola
31	Eeva Kangassalo
32	Anna Näkki

Team Staff
Position	Name
Team manager	Pirjo Lehtonen
Head coach	Timo Himberg⁣⁣
Coach	Kim Forsblom
Coach	Matti Virtanen
Trainer	Katja Liukkonen
Trainer	Mika Salminen
Trainer	Pekka Takala

==== Team Canada Senior ====
The 2013 Team Canada Senior team competed in the 2013 World Ringette Championships. The world championship event marked the 50th anniversary of ringette. The U19 World Ringette Championship, was added to the program for the first time that same tournament.

The 2013 Team Canada Senior team included the following:

CANADA SENIOR
Number	Name
Forwards
3	Jayme Simzer
9	Shaundra Bruvall
14	Andrea Ferguson
18	Jacqueline Gaudet - Captain
23	Kelsey Youldon
44	Julie Primard
66	Stéphanie Séguin
87	Ainsley Ferguson
93	Jamie Bell
Centres
4	Jennifer Gaudet - Assistant Captain (Jennifer Wakefield)
6	Emily Bakker
12	Victoria Russell
17	Jennifer Hartley
Defence
7	Lindsay Burns - Assistant Captain
11	Kacy Hannesson
16	Kaitlyn Youldon
19	Colleen Hagan
24	Jenna McBride
28	Christianne Varty
63	Melissa Findlay
89	Dailyn Bell
Goaltenders
1	Meghan Pittaway
31	Bobbi Mattson
33	Amy Clarkson
41	Jasmine Leblanc

Team Staff
Position	Name
Head coach	Glen Gaudet
Assistant coach	Barb Bautista
Assistant coach	Julie Blanchette
Goalie coach	Keely Brown
Team manager	

==== Team Sweden Senior ====
The 2013 Sweden Senior team included the following:

SWEDEN SENIOR
Number	Name	Club and/or Country
Forwards
3	Sarah Esmail	Canada
4	Maja Bjersbo	Ulriksdals SK
6	Anna Norrbom	Sollentuna HC
17	Angeliqa Rosenqvist Ehn	Ulriksdals SK
18	Sofia Pettersson	Sollentuna
24	Jessika Runolf	Sollentuna HC
Centres
13	My Nilsson	Järna SK
20	Linda Björling	Ulriksdals SK
Defence
2	Daniella Ramel	Ulriksdals SK
5	Anna Wallier	Sollentuna HC
7	Sara Klint	Ulriksdals SK
9	Jessica Alakärppä	Turku ringette Finland
22	Rebecca Gustafson	Ulriksdals SK
25	Olivia Hörvallius	Järna SK
Goaltenders
1	Olivia Blomquist	Ulriksdals SK
30	Linnea Ulfheden	Ulriksdals SK

Team Staff
Position	Name
Manager	Charoline Gustafzon
Manager	Sofia Hörberg
Head coach	Anna Gellner
Assistant coach	Lars Jonsson
Trainer	Lauren Voss

==== Team USA Senior ====
The 2013 USA Senior team included the following:

USA SENIOR
Number	Name
Forwards
7	Meghan Kelly
12	Chelsea Stone
44	Chelsea Moore
88	Britt Kleine
Centres
93	Catherine Cartier
Defence
6	Margie Carter
8	Kimberley Heacock
13	Kari Sadoway
18	Kasey Wheal
19	Caitlyn Roberts
22	Danielle Holliday
96	Kendall Yasui
Goaltenders
31	Jessica Dickin
35	Breanna Beck

Team Staff
Position	Name
Manager	Heather Graham
Manager	Linda Roberts
Head coach⁣	Phyllis Sadoway
Head coach⁣	Beth Veale
Assistant coach⁣	Christopher Kelly
Assistant coach⁣	Jim Wheal

=== Juniors ===
==== Team Finland Junior ====
The 2013 Team Finland Junior team included the following:

FINLAND JUNIOR (U19)
Number	Name
Forwards
5	Roosa Salonen
7	Niina Piiroinen
18	Laura Lyytikäinen
20	Hanna Ovaska
Centres
4	Fanni Elo
9	Miranda Uusi-Kämppä
11	Nelly Ahonen
13	Emmi Isaksson
19	Camilla Lepistö
21	Sara Tenhovaara
Defence
6	Milja Veilo
10	Laura Lahtinen
14	Fiia-Rebecca Impilä
15	Veera Lyytikäinen
16	Heidi Konttori
17	Emma-Julia Wood
Goaltenders
30	Erika Lampi
31	Sannamari Räty
32	Meini Kärnä

Team Staff
Position	Name
Manager	Liisa Kanninen
Head coach	Jouni Levander
Assistant coach	Niko Tuominen
Assistant coach	Matti Virtanen
Trainer	Jari Koski
Trainer	Katja Liukkonen

==== Team Canada Junior ====
The 2013 Team Canada Junior team included the following:

CANADA JUNIOR (U19)
Number	Name
Forwards
2	Jodie Haché
5	Sarah-Lynne Begin
8	Brittany MacDonald
9	Taylor Costello
14	Molly Lewis
22	Amy Kolesnik
44	Maggie Sullivan
88	Allie Marcotte
Centres
12	Karli O'Brien
24	Laura Winges
Defence
3	Paige Johnston
4	Jenna van Koppen
10	Natasha Hurtubise
16	Katherine Mulders
17	Alison O'Brien
66	Sarah Lemkow
Goaltenders
1	Sydney Catlin
29	Sarah Brown
30	Rianne Munro

Team Staff
Position	Name
Head coach	Lary Allen
Assistant coach	Jessica Crouch
Assistant coach	Bryson Lamble

== See also ==
- World Ringette Championships
- International Ringette Federation
- Canada national ringette team
- Finland national ringette team
- Sweden national ringette team
- United States national ringette team

Preceded by Tampere 2010	World Ringette Championships; North Bay; 2013 World Ringette Championships	Succeeded by Helsinki 2016
