= 2012 World Junior Ringette Championships =

Winter team sport championships

2nd World Junior Ringette Championships

Tournament details
- Host country: Canada
- City: London
- Venue(s): Western Fair Sports Centre
- Dates: December 29, 2012–January 3, 2013

Final positions
- Champions: Canada Jr. Canada East U19
- Runner-up: Finland Jr.
- Third place: Canada Jr. Canada West U19
- Fourth place: Russia Jr.

The 2012 World Junior Ringette Championships, (2012 WJRC) also known as the U19 2012 World Championships, was an international ringette tournament and the 2nd edition of the World Junior Ringette Championships organized by the International Ringette Federation (IRF). It was contested in London, Ontario, Canada, between December 29, 2012, and January 3, 2013. The junior tournament was organized exclusively for elite junior national ringette teams. Venues included the Western Fair Sports Centre. This was the last year the event was held separately from the World Ringette Championships. Afterwards a new U19 division was created at the 2013 World Ringette Championships and the junior tournament merged with the larger international program.

Video of the games were produced as webcasts by SportsCanada.TV, Canada's largest online amateur sports network. David Singh was the head coach for Team France and was also the head coach for the National Ringette League team, the Lac St. Louis Adrenaline for the 2012-13 season.

This tournament was the first and last time France and Russia would send national teams to compete at the international level with neither country having sent a national team to compete in either the senior or junior level since.

== History ==
The U19 World Championships was a tournament organized by the International Ringette Federation (IRF) from 2009 to 2012 for elite international Junior ringette athletes. The World Junior Ringette Championships competition was run as a separate tournament from the World Ringette Championships which was designed for adult players. The World Junior Ringette Championships no longer function as a separate event, having since merged in 2013 with the main World Ringette Championships program where both Senior and Junior divisions now exist.

== Venue ==
The tournament was contested in London, Ontario, Canada.

== Teams ==
2012 WJRC Rosters
2012 U19 Team Canada East
2012 U19 Team Canada West
2012 U19 Team Finland
(United States) 2012 U19 Team USA
2012 U19 Team Russia
2012 U19 Team France

== Final standings ==
2012 Junior Final Standings
	Country	Team
1st place, gold medalist(s)	Canada	Team Canada East (U19)
2nd place, silver medalist(s)	Finland	Team Finland (U19)
3rd place, bronze medalist(s)	Canada	Team Canada West (U19)
4th	Russia	Team Russia (U19)
5th	(United States) USA	(United States) Team USA (U19)
6th	France	Team France (U19)

== Rosters ==
=== Team Finland Junior ===
The second appearance by Finland in world junior competition took place at the 2012 World Junior Ringette Championships. Unlike the previous world junior competition, Finland sent only one team to represent the country which was its first official junior national ringette team. The team consisted of nineteen athletes.

FINLAND JUNIOR
Number	Name	Position
Players
	Susanna Tapani	
	Vilma Virta (Captain)	
	Katariina Kurikko	
	Sanni Isaksson	
	Heidi Mattila (Assistant Captain)	
	Lotta Halttunen	
	Rikka Sjögren	
	Julia Jokiranta	
	Elina Tahvanainen	
	Paula Lönngren	
	Trina Merivaara	
	Sonja Hyokyvaara	
	Iiris Wilenius	
	Milla Laakso (Assistant Captain)	
	Ilona Lehtinen	
	Kaisa Viren	
Goaltenders
	Maria Perkkola	
	Ilona Nurmi	
	Camilla Kortesniemi	

Team Staff
Position	Name
General Manager	Minna Hirvonen
Head coach	Jouni Levander
Assistant coach	Niko Tuominen
Assistant coach	Kirsi Pukkila
Trainer	Yari Koski
Trainer	Katja Liukkonen

=== Team Canada Junior ===
Canada was represented by two different U19 junior teams: Team Canada East (Under-19), and Team Canada West (Under-19). Team Canada West (U19) competed with fifteen members from Alberta.

==== Team Canada East ====
CANADA EAST (U19)
Number	Name
Forwards
4	Robin Scott
9	Samantha Nosal
10	Kirsti Mason
11	Leah Erwin
20	Alexandra Lacharité
44	Sue-Ellen McInnis
58	Maude Charbonneau
66	Myriam Lavergne
77	Martine Caissie
89	Megan Gibson
97	Josie Scott
Centres
8	Jennifer Gabel
22	Abby Richardson
Defence
3	Danielle Duncan
7	Josslyn Denstedt
12	Sydney Granger
15	Stacey Richards
18	Emilie P. Bélanger
19	Paige Nosal
Goaltenders
1	Jessie Callander
31	Jasmine LeBlanc
81	Karly McMullen

Team Staff
Position	Name
Head coach	Sharolyn Wouters
Assistant coach	Jackie Gaudet
Assistant coach	Stéphanie Séguin
Goalie coach	Meghan Pittaway
Athletic therapist	Brigitte Roy
Mental Trainer	Alanna Veerman
Team Leader / Manager	Mary Dupuis

==== Team Canada West ====
CANADA WEST (U19)
Number	Name
Forwards
2	Abbie Treslan
8	Justine Exner
12	Melody Caron
14	Lindsey Geddes
24	Kelsie Caine
26	Jocelyn Stock
28	Lindsey Kee
37	Shannon Sarahs
Centres
7	Danielle Bechard
9	Shaundra Bruvall
16	Erin Sarahs
17	Alex Saizew
Defence
4	Rachel Grant
5	Kaylin Bechard
6	Nicole Prokop
11	Jessica Pastro
13	Karine Sabourin
15	Paola Romeo
22	Samantha Renooy
Goaltenders
1	Stacey Bjornsson
41	Anj Grewal
99	Lynn Seraphim

Team Staff
Position	Name
Head coach	Jennifer (Gaudet) Wakefield
Assistant coach | Goalie Coach	Keely Brown
Assistant coach	Beth Veale
Assistant coach	Rob Walker
Goalie coach	Heather Konkin
Trainer	Connie Klassen

=== Team USA Junior ===
An Under-19 (U19) USA Junior team was formed during the 2012 World Junior Ringette Championships using Canadian players to help represent the USA. Three members of the Central Alberta U19 Sting, Meghan Kelly, Kirsten MacGregor and Cassidy Lemasurier, played for the United States U19 national ringette team to help fill out their roster.

USA JUNIOR
Number	Name
Forwards
2	Jayne Barrett
3	Janelle Wilk
5	Kirsten MacGregor
7	Meghan Kelly
9	Kinley Graves
20	Leah Wells
28	Shyla Bruvall
Centres
8	Jesse Nimegeers (Center/Defence)
Defence
8	Jesse Nimegeers (Center/Defence)
10	Robyn Gillespie
12	Cassidy LeMasurier
17	Mia Cameron
19	Jessica Friesen
23	Breanna Josephison
Goaltenders
	Lauryn Girard
73	Janelle Huberdeau

== See also ==
- Canada national ringette team
- Finland national ringette team

Preceded by Prague 2009	World Junior Ringette Championships; London; 2012 World Junior Ringette Championships	Succeeded by North Bay 2013 World Ringette Championships
