= 1990 World Ringette Championships =

1990 edition of the World Ringette Championships

1st World Ringette Championships

Tournament details
- Host country: Canada
- City: Gloucester, Ontario
- Venue: Earl Armstrong Arena
- Dates: January 29 – February 3, 1990
- Teams: 8

Final positions
- Champions: Alberta (Calgary Debs)
- Runners-up: Ontario
- Third place: Quebec
- Fourth place: (Canada) Gloucester

The 1990 World Ringette Championship (1990 WRC) was an international ringette tournament and the first World Ringette Championship in history. Three countries took part: Canada, Finland, and the United States. The tournament was organized by the World Ringette Council, the precursor to the International Ringette Federation (IRF). The event was held in the Canadian city of Gloucester, Ontario from January 29 to February 3, 1990, with eight competing teams at Earl Armstrong Arena.

== Overview ==
Three countries participated: Canada, Finland and United States. A total of 8 teams entered the competition. The teams from Canada included Team Alberta, Team Saskatchewan, Team Manitoba, Team Ontario, Team Quebec, and Team Gloucester (the team from the 1990 WRC's host city).

Finland finished seventh and the United States eighth while Canadian teams monopolized the podium. Team Alberta, which consisted of ringette players from the province's "Calgary Debs", won the first world ringette title in international competition and the WRC's new Sam Jacks Trophy after defeating Team Ontario, 6 – 5 in the final.

== Venue ==
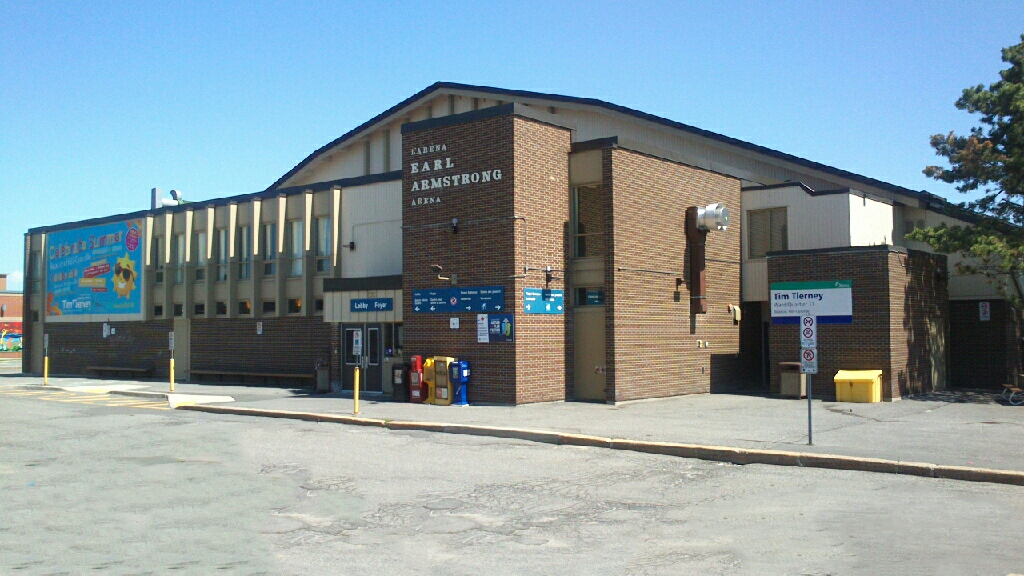

The event was held in the Canadian city of Gloucester, Ontario at the Earl Armstrong Arena.

== Teams ==
1990 WRC Rosters
1990 Team Alberta (Calgary Debs)
1990 Team Ontario
1990 Team Quebec
1990 Team Manitoba
1990 Team Saskatchewan
(Canada) 1990 Team Gloucester (Host)
1990 Team Finland
(United States) 1990 Team USA

== Final standings ==
	Country	Team
1st place, gold medalist(s)	Canada	Team Alberta (Calgary Debs)
2nd place, silver medalist(s)	Canada	Team Ontario
3rd place, bronze medalist(s)	Canada	Team Quebec
4th	Canada	(Canada) Team Gloucester (Host)
5th	Canada	Team Manitoba
6th	Canada	Team Saskatchewan
7th	Finland	Team Finland
8th	(United States) USA	(United States) Team USA

== Rosters ==
=== Team Finland ===
The 1990 Team Finland team included players Arja Oksanen and Virpi Karjalainen.

=== Team Canada ===
Canada sent six different regional teams to the first World Ringette Championships in 1990: Team Alberta (Calgary Debs), Team Ontario, Team Quebec, Team Manitoba, Team Saskatchewan, and Team Gloucester (host).

The winners of the 1989 Western Canadian Ringette Championships advanced to the first World Ringette Championships in 1990 as Team Alberta. The Alberta-based ringette team went on to become the first team to ever win the World Ringette Championship and the Sam Jacks Trophy. Clémence Duchesneau was named the tournament's top goalie.

==== Team Alberta ====
In 1990, Canada's Team Alberta consisted of players from the Calgary Debs who were all-stars who hailed from different areas of the province. The team went on to become the first team to ever win the World Ringette Championship and the Sam Jacks Trophy. The team was inducted into the Ringette Canada Hall of Fame and in 1994 was inducted into the Alberta Sports Hall of Fame.

The 1990 Team Alberta team (Calgary Debs) included the following:

Name	Home city or town
Deb Marek - Goaltender	Calgary
Anne Gillespie - Goaltender	Edmonton
Sandra (Sandy) Fenton - Goaltender	Sherwood Park
Cindy Annala - Defence	Edmonton
Susan Olson	Edmonton
Heather Hanson	Fort Saskatchewan
Judy Diduck	Sherwood Park
Janine Wood	Edmonton
Shauna Flath	Calgary
Lyndsay Wheelans	Edmonton
Shauna Chomik	Sherwood Park
Holly Reeves	Calgary
Diana Kondrosky	Edmonton
Tanya Orr	Edmonton
Lisa Brown	Calgary
Tamara McKernan	Edmonton
Jennifer Rogers	Sherwood Park
Cara Brown	Calgary
Team Staff
Head coach	Reg Wood	Edmonton
Assistant coach	George Buzak	Edmonton
Assistant coach	Frances Willis	Calgary

== See also ==
- World Ringette Championships
- International Ringette Federation
- Canada national ringette team
- Finland national ringette team
- Sweden national ringette team
- United States national ringette team

Preceded by None	World Ringette Championships; Gloucester; 1990 World Ringette Championships	Succeeded by Helsinki 1992
