= Erin Cumpstone =

Canadian softball catcher

Personal information
- Born: November 4, 1980 (age 45) Saskatoon, Saskatchewan
Medal record
Women's Softball
Representing Canada
Pan American Games Softball
Silver medal – second place	2011 Guadalajara	Team
ISF Women's World Championship
Silver medal – second place	2002 Saskatoon, Canada	Team
Ringette
Representing Canada
World Ringette Championships
Silver medal – second place	2010 Tampere, Finland	Team

Erin Cumpstone (born November 4, 1980) is a Canadian softball catcher, former ringette player who also played for the Canadian national ringette team, and currently a National Ringette League coach for the Saskatchewan Heat. She began playing softball at age seven and studied at Simon Fraser University.

== Sports ==
=== Softball ===
Cumpstone was a part of the Canadian softball team who finished 9th at the 2002 World Softball Championships in Saskatoon and part of the Canadian softball team who finished 5th at the 2004 Summer Olympics.

=== Ringette ===
Cumpstone was also a ringette player and a member of Team Canada 2010 during the 2010 World Ringette Championships where the team finished in second place to Finland. Cumpstone also competed in ringette at the 1999 Canada Winter Games and eventually played for one of the first teams in the National Ringette League (NRL), the Saskatoon Wild. As of 2023, she is head coach of the Saskatchewan Heat, a ringette team in NRL. In her spare time, she also coaches the Ice Wolves, the 2024/25 Saskatoon children's Fundamental 2 ringette team.
