= 2009 World Junior Ringette Championships =

2009 first edition of the World Junior Ringette Championships

1st World Junior Ringette Championships

Tournament details
- Host country: Czech Republic
- City: Prague
- Venue: Letňany Arena
- Dates: August 4–8, 2009

Final positions
- Champions: Finland Jr. Finland White Stars U19
- Runners-up: Canada Jr. Canada East U19
- Third place: Finland Jr. Finland Blue Stars U19
- Fourth place: Canada Jr. Canada West U19

The 2009 World Junior Ringette Championships, (2009 WJRC) also known as the U19 2009 World Championships, was an international ringette tournament and the first World Junior Ringette Championships organized by the International Ringette Federation (IRF) exclusively for elite junior national ringette teams. It was contested in Prague, Czech Republic, between August 4–8, 2009, at the Letňany Arena.

== History ==
The World Junior Ringette Championships, known as the U19 World Championships, was a tournament organized by the International Ringette Federation (IRF) from 2009 to 2012 for elite international Junior ringette athletes. The competition was run as a separate tournament from the World Ringette Championships which was designed for adult players. The World Junior Ringette Championships no longer function as a separate event, having since merged in 2013 with the main World Ringette Championships program where both Senior and Junior divisions now exist.

== Overview ==
The first World Junior Ringette Championships took place in August, 2009 in Prague, Czech Republic. Two Canadian teams, Canada West Under-19 and Canada East Under-19 faced two Finnish teams, the Finland White Stars and the Finland Blue Stars. Canada East suffered a heartbreaking loss to the Finland White Stars at the gold medal final.

== Venue ==
The tournament was contested in Prague, Czech Republic at the Letňany Arena.

== Teams ==
2009 WJRC Rosters
2009 U19 Team Canada East
2009 U19 Team Canada West
2009 U19 Finland White Stars
2009 U19 Finland Blue Stars

== Final standings ==
Final round-robin standings
Team	Wins	Losses
Team Canada East (U19)	5	1
Finland White Stars	5	1
Finland Blue Stars	2	4
Team Canada West (U19)	1	5

Final standings
	Country	Team
1st place, gold medalist(s)	Finland	Finland White Stars
2nd place, silver medalist(s)	Canada	Team Canada East (U19)
3rd place, bronze medalist(s)	Finland	Finland Blue Stars
4th	Canada	Team Canada West (U19)

== Rosters ==
=== Team Finland Junior ===
The first appearance by Finland in world junior competition took place during this tournament. Finland sent two different junior teams: the Finland White Stars and the Finland Blue Stars. The tournament's leading scorer was Susanna Tapani with 15 goals and 9 assists for 24 points over 8 games.

==== Finland White Stars ====
Pos.	Name
Goalie	Jennie Wessman
Goalie	Anna Näkki
	Susanna Tapani
	Miamari Lammassaari
	Siiri Kallionpaa
	Ninni Räty
	Ira Merivaara
	Nelly Ylitalo
	Salla Junni
	Emmi Jusslin
	Roosa Aho
	Ida-Maria Salama
	Tiina Pasanen
Team Staff
Head coach	Timo Himberg
Goaltender coach	Niko Tuominen
Assistant coach
Trainer

==== Finland Blue Stars ====
Pos.	Name
Goalie	Kirsi Pesonen
	Kaisa Hurske (Captain)
	Tanja Eloranta
	Jarna Immonen
	Saara Lahti
	Mia Huvinen
Team Staff
Head coach	Katariina Forsblom
Assistant coach
Assistant coach
Trainer

=== Team Canada Junior ===
Canada was represented at the junior level by two separate teams: Team Canada East (Under-19), and Team Canada West (Under-19).

==== Team Canada East ====
CANADA EAST (U19)
Number	Name	
Forwards
3	Jayme Simzer	
12	Lauren Morse	
16	Sheri Adams	
22	Joelle Proulx	
23	Kristin Bortolon	
91	Audrey-Anne Plante	
Centres
2	Kelsey Youldon	
6	Emily Bakker	
9	Alexandra Bateman	
11	Kaitlyn Youldon	
13	Samantha McIntosh – Centre, Forward	
Defence
7	Jessica Snowdon	
14	Samantha Hodgson	
17	Jaclyn Wise	
21	Sarah Bernard-Lacaille	
31	Catherine Giguère	
Goaltenders
1	Ashley Miller	
37	Élizabeth Audette-Bourdeau	
Reserves
Number	Name	Position
4	Dominique Scapillati	Defence
10	Shannon Barber	Forward
27	Lisa Bury	Forward
47	Véronike Dufort	Defence
77	Rebecca Collings	Forward
60	Kathleen Perreault	Goalkeeper

Team Staff
Position	Name
Head coach	Glen Gaudet
Assistant coach	Julie Blanchette
Assistant coach	Sharolyn Wouters
Apprentice Coach	Jacqueline Gaudet

==== Team Canada West ====
CANADA WEST (U19)
Number	Name	
Forwards
2	Tasha Bryenton	
10	Brooklyn Lindeman	
12	Evan Brown	
16	Stephanie Zimmel	
21	Leah Montsion	
77	Sarah Lesperance	
87	Melissa Sieben	
Centres
3	Ashley Boos	
7	Christianne Varty	
19	Morgan Jones	
Defence
4	Alex Bayko	
5	Carolina Romeo	
9	Alyssa Bosch	
11	Kirsten Hack	
14	Kerri Ann Tyschinski	
15	Tanya Twerdy	
Goaltenders
31	Kassy Bailey	
99	Elise Crocker	
Reserves
Number	Name	Position
8	Rachelle Kirouac	Forward
17	Emily Webb	Forward
18	Taylor Odynski	Defence
22	Cassandra Shier	Forward
41	Danielle MacKenzie	Goalkeeper

Team Staff
Position	Name
Head coach	Chris Belan
Assistant coach	Sue Reid
Assistant coach	Laura Pitt
Apprentice Coach	Drew Belan

== See also ==
- Canada national ringette team
- Finland national ringette team

Preceded by None	World Junior Ringette Championships; Prague; 2009 World Junior Ringette Championships	Succeeded by London 2012
