= Trevor Mack =

Canadian Tsilhqot'in filmmaker (born 1992)

- Trevor Mack on set of The Blanketing (2012)
- Born: Trevor Ryan Mack; June 28, 1992 (age 34); Vancouver, British Columbia, Canada
- Occupations: Film Director, Film Producer, Writer
- Years active: 2010–present
- Notable work: The Blanketing, Clouds of Autumn, ʔEtsu (Grandmother), In the Valley of Wild Horses, Portraits from a Fire
- Awards: B.C. Emerging Filmmaker, 2021 Vancouver International Film Festival Best Director, 2021 American Indian Film Festival One to Watch, 2021 Vancouver Film Critics Circle Kevin Tierney Emerging Producer Award, 2021 Indiescreen Awards Best Director, 2022 Leo Awards
- Website: www.trevormack.ca www.nenqayni.org

Trevor Mack (born June 28, 1992) is a Tsilhqot'in Canadian filmmaker, writer, philosopher and former Crashed Ice extreme sports athlete.

He is best known for writing, directing, and producing the feature-film Portraits from a Fire, along with his short films The Blanketing, Clouds of Autumn and In the Valley of Wild Horses. His debut feature-length film Portraits from a Fire made its world premiere at the 2021 Atlantic International Film Festival and was the first ever narrative feature film written and directed by a Tsilhqot'in filmmaker.

He competed in the Canadian tour of the Red Bull Crashed Ice World Championships from 2011 to 2015.

In 2025, he co-founded NENQAYNI Foundation with his wife Valeria Mack. The incorporate non-profit focuses on indigenous food sovereignty and indigenous land stewardship capacity-building through international cultural exchange trips.

== Film career ==
At 15 years old, Mack started his pursuit in film by editing together footage from the popular Xbox video game series Halo to create montages in which he posted to on-line forums and YouTube. As he gained popularity with his Halo montages, he helped co-found a freelance video editing, motion graphics, and videography group called 'Viral Design' that produced product promotional videos for companies such as Red Bull, SteelSeries, and Gunnar Optiks.

In 2011, Mack enrolled in the 'Motion Picture Arts' film program at Capilano University in North Vancouver, British Columbia. Having failed his first year, Mack dropped out in his second year of courses.

The day after he dropped out of film school he started working with the Provincial Health Services Authority in a suicide-awareness pilot program titled 'Cuystwi'. Throughout the several years of working on the project, Mack collaborated with Indigenous filmmakers such as Damien Bouchard, Amanda Strong, and Asia Youngman. The filmmakers would routinely travel to reserve communities in British Columbia that registered for the pilot program to teach children how to express themselves through filmmaking.

=== The Blanketing (2013) ===
The Blanketing is a fictional, alternative-history story that combines two distinct and crucial events within the Tsilhqot'in-Colonial historical canon. Both the 1864 Tsilhqot'in War and 1862 Pacific Northwest smallpox epidemic were combined, narratively, to showcase how devastating the events were towards the Tsilhqot'in people. Yet, the film ends on uplifting and defying imagery—a theme Mack would continually bring to his future films. In the fall of 2011, Mack started a Crowd funding campaign asking for funds for his first short film The Blanketing. After 10 months of development and pre-production he began principal photography in the summer of 2012.

After he premiered the short film in his home town of Williams Lake, British Columbia on May 3, 2013, the short film was accepted into the following film festivals:

- 2013 imagineNATIVE Film + Media Arts Festival
- 2013 Toronto Independent Film Festival
- 2013 Vancouver Indigenous Media Arts Festival
- 2013 Red Nation Film Festival
- 2014 Square Pegs IV Film Festival

=== Clouds of Autumn (2015) ===
Clouds of Autumn follows a brother and sister whose carefree childhood in a Tsilhqot'in community is torn apart when the sister is forced to attend a Canadian residential school in the early 1970s.

Interestingly, Mack collaborated with non-Indigenous filmmaker Matthew Taylor Blais, whom Mack was roommates with at the time. The purpose of the collaboration was to learn about one another's culture by deliberately telling such a controversial story together.

Mack's maternal grandmother gave birth to 13 children, 10 of whom—including his mother—were taken away to Canadian residential schools in the interior of British Columbia, Canada. Some were as young as 6 years old when they were taken away for the entire school year.

After receiving a production grant from Canada Council for the Arts, Mack started principal photography for Clouds of Autumn in August 2014. The film had its North American premiere at the 2015 Toronto International Film Festival and also screened at the following festivals, among others:

- 2015 Vancouver International Film Festival
- 2015 Ottawa International Film Festival
- 2015 Tacoma Film Festival
- 2015 Whistler Film Festival
- 2015 imagineNATIVE Film + Media Arts Festival
- 2016 Air Canada enRoute Film Festival

'Best Canadian Short Drama', 2015 imagineNATIVE Film + Media Arts Festival

'Prix Jeunesse', 2016 Festival Cine Alter'Natif

'Achievement in Cinematography', 2016 Air Canada EnRoute Film Festival

=== ʔEtsu (Grandmother) (2017) ===
With only a $500 budget, Mack collaborated with actor Elias Louie (Clouds of Autumn) in the summer of 2017. The short film is a POV-styled portrait of child abuse and family relations on an isolated reserve in Canada. The film premiered at the 2017 Toronto International Film Festival and played at the 2017 Vancouver International Film Festival.

=== In The Valley of Wild Horses (2018) ===
Partnering with the Xeni Gwe'tin First Nations and TELUS Originals, Mack co-directed the short documentary with fellow Indigenous filmmaker Asia Youngman. The film follows the Xeni Gwet'in Youth Wagon trip, a 200-km, 8-day horse-and-wagon trip beginning from Nemiah Valley and ending at Williams Lake. The film premiered at the 2018 Vancouver International Film Festival, among others:

- 2019 Las Cruces International Film Festival
- 2019 Māoriland Film Festival
- 2019 Salt Spring Film Festival
- 2019 Powell River Film Festival

=== Portraits from a Fire (2021) ===
Portraits from a Fire is Trevor Mack's debut feature-length film. The project was a collaboration between Mack and writers Manny Mahal and Derek Vermillion, as well as with cinematographer Kaayla Wachell and producers Kate Kroll and Rylan Friday. The inception of the story came from Mack's healing process after being assaulted and mugged in downtown Vancouver in 2016. Portraits from a Fire is a coming-of-age film following an eccentric misfit named Tyler who spends his days recording and vlogging his Indigenous community and hanging out with his grandparents. That is until he meets Aaron—an older, influential teenager who pushes him to show his latest work about his family to the community, leading to a reckoning between the past and the future, life and death, parents and son. The film made its world premiere at the 2021 Atlantic International Film Festival in Halifax, Nova Scotia, as well as played in the following festivals:

- 2021 FIN Atlantic International Film Festival
- 2021 Vancouver International Film Festival
- 2021 imagineNATIVE Film + Media Arts Festival
- 2021 Edmonton International Film Festival
- 2021 American Indian Film Festival
- 2021 Cinéfest Sudbury Film Festival
- 2022 Canada China International Film Festival
- 2022 Virginia Film Festival
- 2022 Shining Mountains Film Festival

As of January 2023, Portraits from a Fire has accumulated 15 awards:

- Best Feature Film, 2021 Edmonton International Film Festival
- Best B.C. Film & B.C. Emerging Filmmaker Award: Trevor Mack, 2021 Vancouver International Film Festival
- Best Director: Trevor Mack & Best Supporting Actor: Asivak Koostachin, 2021 American Indian Film Festival
- Best Script, 2021 Canada China International Film Festival
- Kevin Tierney Emerging Producer Award: Kate Kroll, Rylan Friday, Trevor Mack, 2021 Indiescreen Awards
- Best Picture & Best Direction & Best Cinematography & Best Score & Best Editing, 2022 Leo Awards
- Best Picture & One to Watch: Trevor Mack, 2022 Vancouver Film Critics Circle
- Best Feature Film, 2022 Shining Mountains Film Festival

== Red Bull Crashed Ice World Championships ==
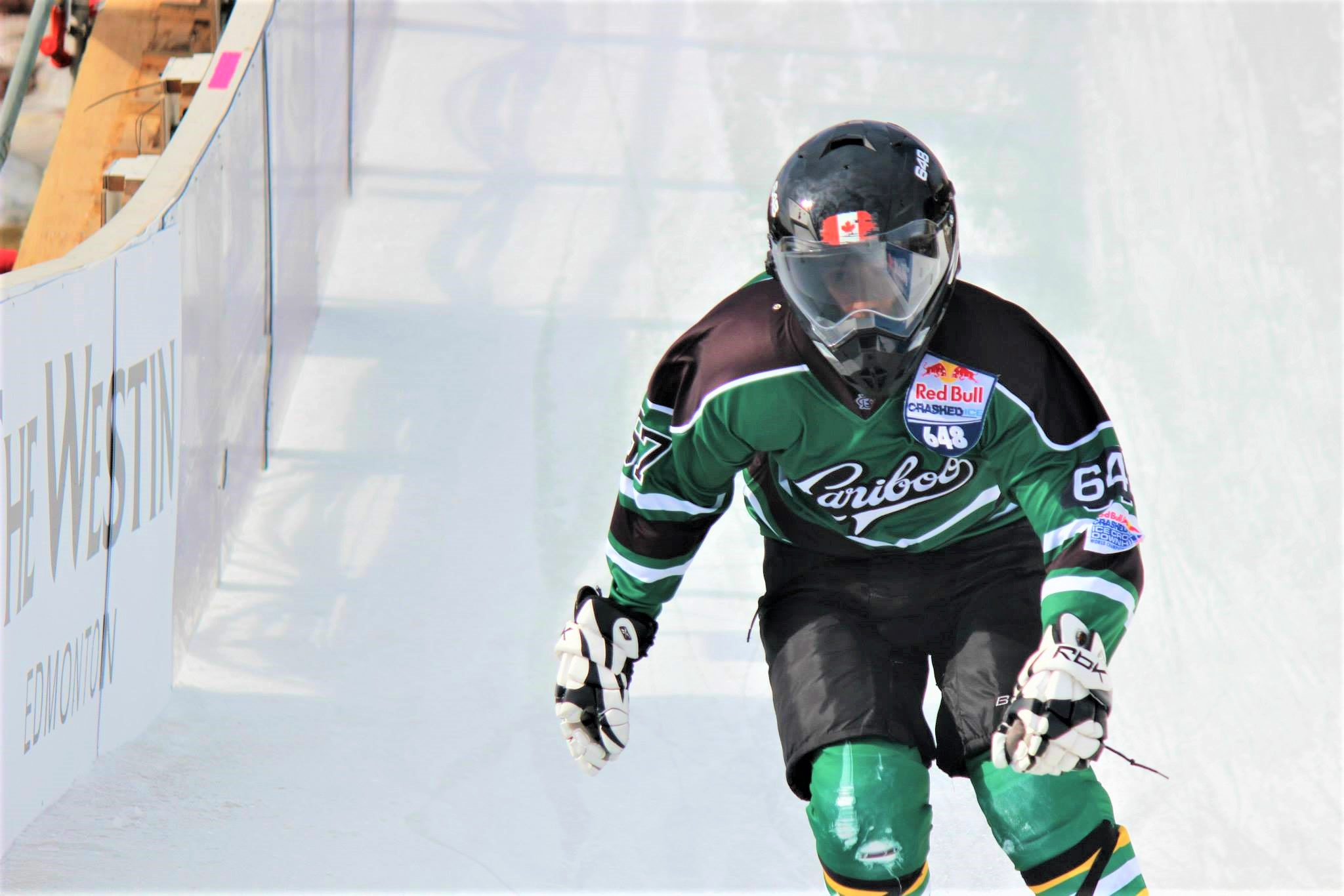
Trevor Mack competing during the 2014 Red Bull Crashed Ice World Championships in Edmonton, Alberta, Canada.

While also producing his first short films, Mack was simultaneously competing in the Canadian tour of the Red Bull Crashed Ice World Championships. From 2011 to 2015, Red Bull Crashed Ice hosted Canadian tours of the World Championships in Quebec City, Niagara Falls, and Edmonton.

Red Bull Crashed Ice, now known as Ice Cross Downhill, is a winter extreme sporting event which involves direct competitive downhill skating on a walled track featuring sharp turns and high vertical drops. Ice cross downhill is similar to ski cross and boardercross, except with ice skates on an ice track, instead of using skis or snowboards on a snow track.

Events were held under the name Red Bull Crashed Ice from 2001-2019, and have been sanctioned by the ATSX since 2019.

== Psychedelic plant medicine activism ==
Mack has credited his latest film work on his experiences with Psychedelic plant medicine, namely psilocybin mushrooms, LSD, and Yopo.

On June 20, 2021, Mack was invited to speak about alongside famed author and professor Wade Davis, plant medicine teacher Jazmin Pirozek, and Kim Haxton for the inaugural World Psychedelics Day, which featured an eclectic roster of talks with speakers such as Dr. Dennis McKenna, Paul Stamets, Dr. Gabor Mate, Dr. Andrew Weil, and Alex and Allyson Grey. The panel Mack spoke to was titled 'Indigenous Sovereignty & Plant Medicines'.

In the same year, Mack was named as one of two indigenous advisors for the Canadian Psychedelic Association of Canada.

== Political life ==
In April 2023, Mack led the initiative to bring together several Tsilhqot'in delegates to the Brooklyn Museum to reconvene with several Tsilhqot'in sacred baskets. The baskets were taken from the Tsilhqot'in territory in an expedition in 1905 which were then eventually sold to the Brooklyn Museum. The process of bringing the baskets back to the Tsilhqot'in people is currently underway.

In March 2025, Mack was duly elected as councillor of his home community of Tl'etinqox, making him one of the youngest elected leaders within the Tsilhqot'in nation.
