= ATSX =

Ice skating organization

ATSX (All Terrain Skate Cross Federation) is the organization that sanctions ice cross downhill competitions since 2019. Previous events were known as Red Bull Crashed Ice.

== Races ==
=== ATSX1000 ===
The ATSX 1000 offers the highest international competition level. Access to an ATSX 1000 competition is restricted. Only competitors in accordance with the 201 Limitation of participation at ATSX 1000 rule will be invited to take part in an ATSX 1000 race. An ATSX 1000 race will host a competition for all categories (Men, Women, and Junior). The ATSX 1000 races allow competitors to earn points to the World Ranking and the World Championship.

Points obtained at an ATSX 1000 race range from 1000pts for the 1st place and down to 2.375pts for the 200th place. The points will be tallied and will be added to the World Ranking update of the ATSX World Ranking.

=== ATSX500 and ATSX250 ===
ATSX 500 and 250 races were formally known as Riders Cup races, and are worth 500 and 250 points respectively. With its establishment, ATSX 1000 competitors must qualify through racing in ATSX 500 and ATSX 250 races.

Points obtained at an ATSX 500 race range from 500pts for the 1st place and down to 2.375pts for the 200th place.

Points obtained at an ATSX 250 race range from 250pts for the 1st place and get down to 1.1875pts for the 200th place.

=== ATSX100 ===
The ATSX 100 level generally corresponds to the National Championship level races. The National Championship races allow competitors to earn points solely to the World Ranking. Competitors of all nationalities are invited to participate in a National Championship race. The National Championship hosting organization can decide to set an independent National ranking involving only their National competitors. In this case, it needs to be done under the supervision of the respective National Federation with the approbation of the ATSX.

Points obtained at an ATSX 100 race range from 100pts for the 1st place and down to 0.475pts for the 200th place. Athlete can participate in many ATSX100 races however, only the best result from the competitor's ATSX100 races will remain in the competitor's World Ranking points calculation.

== The ATSX World Championship ==
The points earned at ATSX 1000, ATSX 500, and ATSX 250 races of the same season will be compiled to crown the Man and Woman World Champion. The Ice Cross World Championship overall points calculation will consider throw out results. Therefore, a certain number of races in each competition level will count in the final World Championship points calculation as follows:

ATSX 1000
races raced	races counted
1	1
2	2
3	2
4	3
5	3
6	4
7	4
8	5
9	6
10	7

ATSX 500
races raced	races counted
1	1
2	1
3	2
4	2
5	3
6	3
7	4
8	4
9	5
10	5

ATSX 250
races raced	races counted
1	1
2	1
3	1
4	2
5	2
6	3
7	3
8	3
9	4
10	4

If two races of the same tiers are held the same weekend, that will count for one race in the total number of races in the season calculation.

== Results ==
In 2019/2020 the first season under the new name was held.

=== 2019–2020 ===
Men
Position	Name	Country	Points
1	Cameron Naasz	United States	2550
2	Kyle Croxall	Canada	2550
3	Luca Dallago	Austria	2050

Women
Position	Name	Country	Points
1	Jacqueline Legere	Canada	2550
2	Amanda Trunzo	United States	2425
3	Anaïs Morand	Switzerland	2050

Juniors
Position	Name	Country	Points
1	Leevi Nakari	Finland	2400
2	Arthur Richalet-Chaudeur	France	2350
3	Yegor Tutarikov	Russia	2150

=== 2022–2023 ===
Men
Position	Name	Country	Points
1	Mirko Lahti	Finland	975
2	Robin Worling	Canada	950
3	Richard Van Wijhe	Sweden	625

Women
Position	Name	Country	Points
1	Veronika Windisch	Austria	1000
2	Justīne Zonne	Latvia	950
3	Amandine Condroyer	France	825

Juniors
Position	Name	Country	Points
1	Linus Ollikainen	Finland	950
2	Arthur Richalet-Chaudeur	France	875
3	Arthur Fort	France	750
