= Ottawa Gee-Gees women's ice hockey =

- University: University of Ottawa
- Conference: OUA; OUA East Division
- Head coach: Alison Domenico
- Arena: Minto Sports Complex; Ottawa, Ontario
- Colors: Garnet and Gray

The Ottawa Gee-Gees represent the University of Ottawa in Canadian Interuniversity Sport women's ice hockey. Home games are contested at the uOttawa Minto Sports Complex, and the Gee-Gees were former members of the Quebec Student Sports Federation. Starting with the 2024-25 season, the Gee-Gees moved into the Ontario University Athletics conference, participating in the East Division.

== History ==
The team played its first season in 1999 under then Head Coach Normand Chouinard. For their 3rd and 4th seasons, Marco Ouellette was the head coach.

Shelley Coolidge became head coach of the program in the spring of 2003. During the 2003–04 campaign, she guided the Gee-Gees to the CIS national championship game where they were defeated by the Alberta Pandas. In 2006–07 she guided the Gee-Gees to a 12–6–0 record, the best in program history.

On January 16, 2008, the Gee Gees hosted a game at Scotiabank Place in Ottawa, as the Gee-Gees played the Carleton Ravens. In 2008, the Gee-Gees hosted the CIS national tournament and finished with a 1–2 record in the tourney. Their only win came in a shoot-out victory over St. Francis Xavier, where the Gee-Gees prevailed by a 7–6 tally. Heading into the 2008–09 season, goaltender Jessika Audet was the oldest varsity student-athlete at uOttawa.

In her first appearance for the Ottawa Gee-Gees, Fannie Desforges scored a goal versus the York Lions in an exhibition game on September 20, 2008 as she scored a goal in a 4–0 shutout victory. In her first ever regular season game (contested on October 18, 2008), she scored her first CIS goal in a victory over the Concordia Stingers.

== Season-by-season Results ==
=== Ontario University Athletics Conference (2025 - Present) ===
Season	Wins	Losses	Ties	Division rank
2026–27				
2025–26	15	11		

=== Quebec Student Sports Federation (1999 - 2025) ===
Season	Wins	Losses	Ties	Division rank
2024–25	15	11		
2023–24	8	17		
2022–23	16	9		
2021–22	7	8		
2019–20	11	9		
2010–19	6	14		
2010–18	10	10		
2010–17	9	11		
2010–16	11	9		
2010–15	8	12		
2010–14	9	11		
2010–13	7	13		
2010–12	6	14		
2010–11	7	13		
2009–10	8	12		
2008–09	8	8	2	2nd
2007–08	12	14	3	
2006–07	12	6	0	
2005–06	8	5	2	2nd
2004–05	8	6	4	
2003–04	6	7	4	

== International ==
- At the 2011 Street and Ball Hockey World Championships in Bratislava, Slovakia, Fannie Desforges and Danika Smith participated for Team Canada. They would claim a silver in the tournament.

=== Winter Universiade ===
Player	Event	Result
Kayla Hottot	2009 Winter Universiade	Gold medal
Melodie Bouchard	2019 Winter Universiade	Silver medal
Christine Deaudelin	2019 Winter Universiade	Silver medal
Maude Levesque-Ryan	2019 Winter Universiade	Silver medal
Marie-Camille Theoret	2019 Winter Universiade	Silver medal

- Melodie Bouchard, Forward Canada: 2017 Winter Universiade
- Shelley Coolidge Assistant Coach Canada: 2009 Winter Universiade

=== Other ===
In February 2010, Kayla Hottot was one of the female qualifiers for a Red Bull Crashed Ice competition. She would advance to the 2010 Red Bull Crashed Ice World Championship finals in Québec City in March 2010. Other Gee Gees women's ice hockey players that have competed in the Red Bull Crashed Ice include Fannie Desforges and Dominique Lefebvre.

Having competed in the Red Bull Crashed Ice competitions from 2012 to 2015, Gee Gees forward Alicia Blomberg achieved a podium finish in 2014, capturing the bronze medal in the world championships. Salla Kyhälä of Finland captured the gold medal while fellow Canadian Jacqueline Legere grabbed the silver medal.

== Awards and honours ==
- Melodie Bouchard, 2015–16 U Sports All-Canadian Second Team
- Melodie Bouchard, 2015–16 U Sports All-Rookie
- Fannie Desforges, Player of the Game, Game 2 of 2010 Theresa Humes Tournament
- Fannie Desforges, Ottawa Gee Gees MVP (2011)
- Kayla Hottot, 2008 CIS tournament all-star team

=== OUA Awards ===
- Beatrice Bilodeau, Ottawa, 2025-26 OUA East Marion Hilliard Award

=== RSEQ Awards ===
- Shelley Coolidge, 2003–04 RSEQ Coach of the Year
- Danika Smith, 2008–2009 RSEQ Marion-Hilliard Award for best combining sport, academic and community service
- 2016–17 RSEQ LEADERSHIP & CITIZENSHIP AWARD (CIS Marion Hilliard Award nominee): Vickie Lemire

==== RSEQ All-Stars ====
First Team All-Star

- Kim Kerr, First-team all-star RSEQ 2006–2007
- Danika Smith, 2006–2007 RSEQ first-team all-star
- Valérie Watson, 2011–12 RSEQ FIRST ALL-STAR TEAM
- 2016–17 RSEQ First Team All-Stars: Bryanna Newald
- 2016–17 RSEQ First Team All-Stars: Mélodie Bouchard, Ottawa
- 2019–20 RSEQ FIRST TEAM ALL-STAR: Christine Deaudelin

Second Team All-Star

- Christine Allen, Second-team all-star RSEQ 2006–2007
- Christine Allen, Second-team all-star RSEQ 2007–2008
- Jessika Audet, 2008–09 second-team RSEQ all-star
- Fannie Desforges, 2008-2009 Second-team RSEQ All-Star
- Fannie Desforges, RSEQ 2012 Second Team All-Star
- Kelsey DeWit, 2008–09 second-team RSEQ all-star
- Érika Pouliot, 2008–2009 second-team RSEQ all-star
- Danika Smith, 2005–2006 RSEQ second-team all-star
- 2011–12 RSEQ SECOND ALL-STAR TEAM: Fannie Desforges
- 2019–20 RSEQ SECOND TEAM ALL-STAR: Aurélie Dubuc, Ottawa
- 2019–20 RSEQ SECOND TEAM ALL-STAR: Mélodie Bouchard, Ottawa

==== RSEQ All-Rookies ====
- 2011–12 RSEQ ALL- ROOKIE TEAM: Stéphanie Mercier
- 2011–12 RSEQ ALL- ROOKIE TEAM: Valérie Watson
- 2011–12 RSEQ ALL- ROOKIE TEAM: Élarie Leclair-Célestin
- 2019–20 RSEQ ALL-ROOKIE TEAM: Aurélie Dubuc
- 2019–20 RSEQ ALL-ROOKIE TEAM: Alice Fillion

=== U Sports Awards ===
- Joelle Levac, 2007–2008 CIS academic all-Canadian
- Maude Laramée: 2012–13 USports All-Rookie Team
- Beatrice Bilodeau, 2026 USPORTS Marion Hilliard Award

=== University Awards ===
Varsity President's Award

- 2016–17: Vickie Lemire
- 2013–14: Stéphanie Mercier
- 2012–13: Alicia Blomberg
- 2011–12: Érika Pouliot
- 2008–09: Christine Allen
- 2004–05: Amy Bombay
- 2003–04: Marlies Phillion
- 1999–2000: Karina Verdurn

Varsity Rookies of the Year

- 2019–20: Aurélie Dubuc
- 2015–16: Mélodie Bouchard
- 2014–15: Maude Lévesque-Ryan

=== Team captains ===
- 2006–07, Danika Smith & Sarah McLeish
- 2007–08, Danika Smith
- 2008–09, Danika Smith
- 2010–11, Erika Pouliot
- 2011–12, Erika Pouliot
- 2012–13, Fannie Desforges
- 2024-25, Beatrice Bilodeau
- 2025-26, Beatrice Bilodeau

=== Team MVP ===
- 2014–15: Maude Lévesque-Ryan
- 2015–16: Mélodie Bouchard

== Exhibition ==
=== NCAA ===
Date	Opponent	Score	Notes
November 30, 2008	Syracuse Orange	4–3 (OT)	Game winning goal scored by Cass Breukelman

=== PWHL ===
Date	Opponent	Score	Notes
February 7, 2009	St. Thomas	3–1	Goals scored by Fannie Desforges (shorthanded), Michelle Snowden (power play), Cass Breukelman

== Gee-Gees in pro hockey ==
= CWHL All-Star	= NWHL All-Star	= Clarkson Cup Champion	= Isobel Cup Champion

Player	Position	Team(s)	League(s)	Years	Titles
Fannie Desforges	Forward	Canadiennes de Montreal	CWHL	2	
Mandi Duhamel	Forward	Ottawa Lady Senators	CWHL		
Danika Smith	Defence	Ottawa Lady Senators	CWHL		
