= Fannie Desforges =

Canadian athlete from Fournier, Ontario

- Height: 5 ft 6 in (168 cm)
- Position: Forward
- Shot: Left
- PWHL RSEQ CWHL team: Ottawa Senators; Ottawa Gee-Gees; Montreal Stars (2013-15)
- Playing career: 2007–2015
Medal record
Women's ice hockey
Representing Canada
ISBHF World Street Hockey Championships
Silver medal – second place	2011 Slovakia	Team
Gold medal – first place	2013 Canada	Team

Fannie Desforges is a Canadian ice hockey forward. She is the second Canadian woman to win a competition in the Red Bull Crashed Ice competition. In addition, she has competed for the Ottawa Gee Gees women's ice hockey program in Canadian Interuniversity Sport, while competing for the Canada women's national ball hockey team at the 2011 Street and Ball Hockey World Championships in Bratislava, Slovakia. In the 2013 CWHL Draft, she was selected by the Montreal Stars.

== Ice hockey ==
In 2007-08, Desforges played for the Ottawa Lady Senators of the PWHL and captured the PWHL Silver medal.

=== CIS ===
Desforges competed for the Ottawa Gee-Gees of the RSEQ. Her first appearance for the Ottawa Gee-Gees came in an exhibition match versus the York Lions on September 20, 2008. She scored a goal in a 4-0 shutout victory. In her first ever regular season game (contested on October 18, 2008), she scored her first CIS goal in a victory over the Concordia Stingers.

In a November 30, 2008 exhibition match versus the Syracuse Orange women's ice hockey team of the NCAA, Desforges scored a goal in a 4-3 overtime triumph. On November 20, 2011, Desforges registered two goals (including the game winner 15 seconds into overtime) as the Gee Gees defeated the crosstown rival Carleton Lady Ravens for the third consecutive time.

Her final appearance with the Ottawa Gee-Gees would take place on March 31, 2013 as the Gee-Gees took on the Czech Republic national women's ice hockey team in an exhibition game in Rockland, Ontario, prior to the Czechs participating in the 2013 IIHF Women's World Championship in nearby Ottawa. Desforges would score a goal in a 6-3 loss for the Gee-Gees.

=== CWHL ===
With the Montreal Stars, she wore number 23 in her rookie season, but switched to number 28 during the 2014-15 season. Desforges would make her debut with the Montreal Stars on November 9, 2013 against the Boston Blades. On December 1, 2013, against the Brampton Thunder, she would log her first point with the club, registering an assist on a second period short-handed goal by Cathy Chartrand.

Two weeks later, Desforges would score her first goal. In a 5-2 final on December 15 against the Calgary Inferno, she scored a shorthanded goal in the first period against goaltender Kathy Desjardins. Credited with the assist was Ann-Sophie Bettez, who would finish the season as the winner of the Angela James Bowl.

As a side note, the final goal of her CWHL career took place on February 9, 2014, a 5-0 shutout win against the Brampton Thunder. Scoring in the second period against Sonja van der Bliek, the assist was credited to Camille Dumais.

The last point of her CWHL career took place in a 5-2 win against the Calgary Inferno on February 1, 2015. Said point would prove to have historic ramifications. Along with Chelsey Saunders, the two gained the assist on a third period goal scored by CWHL co-founder Lisa-Marie Breton-Lebreux, which would be the last goal in her storied career.

=== Ball hockey ===
At the 2011 Street and Ball Hockey World Championships in Bratislava, Slovakia, she participated for Team Canada. Former Gee Gees teammate Danika Smith also played for Canada. In the second game of the tournament (versus Austria), Desforges scored a goal in a 14-0 win over Austria. Desforges and Team Canada would claim a silver in the tournament. She would return to the Canadian contingent for the 2013 Women's World Ball Hockey Championships. Contested in Saint John's, Newfoundland, she helped Canada claim the gold medal while finishing as the leading scorer and earning MVP honors.

== Red Bull Crashed Ice ==
Like former women's ice hockey players Dani Rylan, Amanda Trunzo and Rush Zimmerman, Desforges has competed in the Red Bull Crashed Ice championships. She has earned the nickname Fearless Fannie and competed at Red Bull Crashed Ice in Quebec City in 2011 and finished fifth overall. On March 18, 2012, she claimed the gold medal in a competition in Quebec City (The Quebec City event is the only event on the four-city schedule which has a women’s competition). Going into the final race, she beat out last year’s winner, Salla Kyhälä of Finland, and fellow Canadian, Marquise Brisebois. She had the Gee-Gee logo emblazoned on her helmet At the 2013 Red Bull Crashed Ice world championships, Desforges finished third. Fellow Canadian Dominique Thibault grabbed first place. Ironically, the two would be teammates for the Montreal Stars during the 2013-14 CWHL season.

== Career stats ==
=== CIS ===
Year	GP	G	A	PTS	+/-	PIM
2008-09	18	4	6	10		28
2009-10	20	8	8	16		30
2010-11	20	9	8	17		34
2011-12	20	6	12	18	+0	20

==== Postseason ====
Year	GP	G	A	PTS	PIM
2008-09	5	0	0	0	2
2009-10	3	0	1	1	4
2011-12	3	0	2	2	10

=== CWHL ===
Year	GP	G	A	PTS	+/-	PIM
2013-14	19	6	1	7	+7	12
2014-15	20	0	1	1	-8	12

== Awards and honours ==
- MVP for Trois-Rivières Patriotes summer hockey team
- 2008-2009 Second-team QSSF All-Star
- Player of the Game, Game 2 of 2010 Theresa Humes Tournament
- Ottawa Gee Gees MVP (2011)
- RSEQ 2012 Second Team All-Star
- Leading Scorer, 2013 ISBHF Women's Worlds
- Most Valuable Player, 2013 ISBHF Women's Worlds
