= Air Canada enRoute Film Festival =

- Location: Canada
- Founded: 2007
- Hosted by: Air Canada & enRoute Magazine
- Language: English, French
- Website: http://www.enroutefilm.com

The Air Canada enRoute Film Festival was an annual film festival of short films hosted by Air Canada and its in-flight magazine enRoute. Films were shown as in-flight entertainment as well as screened theatrically in Toronto, Montreal and Vancouver.

== Background ==
The festival began in 2007. The festival had a different jury each year consisting of film industry professionals including famous actors, writers, directors and producers. The festival's purpose was to generate exposure for emerging filmmakers. The last year the festival was in place was 2016.

== 2007 ==
2007 Jury: Atom Egoyan, Piers Handling, Robert Lantos, Donald Sutherland, Denise Robert, Patrick Huard, David La Haye, Torill Kove, Paul Gratton, Geoff Pevere and Hussain Amarshi.

2007 Award Winners:

- Best Student Film – James Vandewater – Upside-Down Girl
- Achievement in Animation – David Seitz – Forest Frenetic
- Achievement in Direction – Aaron Beckum – Who Wants to be an Amerikan
- Destination Inspiration Award – Carmen Forsberg – Q'oyllur Ritti
- Canadian Reflections Award – Paul St. Amand – Parallels

== 2008 ==
2008 Jury: Dan Aykroyd, Wendy Crewson, Colm Feore, Arsinée Khanjian, Andrea Martin, Patricia Rozema, Rob Stewart, Yves Simoneau and Noah Cowan.

2008 Award Winners:

- Best Student Film – Jacquelyn Mills – For Wendy
- Achievement in Animation – Eva Cvijanovic – Play
- Achievement in Direction – Brandon Cronenberg and Jonathan Hodgson - Broken Tulips
- Achievement in Cinematography – Benjamin Schuetze – Damian and Ende
- Cineplex People's Choice Award – Sébastien Rist and Sarah Quinn - This Little Piggy

== 2009 ==
In 2009, the festival opened up submissions to more than just film students, changing the aim of the festival to emerging filmmakers.

2009 jury: Remy Girard, Judy Gladstone, Deepa Mehta, Lisa Ray, and Michael McGowan.

2009 Award Winners:

- Best Short Film – Sarah Fortin for Synthétiseur
- Achievement in Direction – Sarah Fortin for Synthétiseur
- Achievement in Cinematography – Leigh Ann Maynard for A Season to Wither
- Achievement in Animation – Leigh Ann Maynard for A Season to Wither
- Best Documentary – Jake Chirico for The Freshwater Plague

== 2010 ==
2010 Jury: Alan Cumming, Carlo Rota, Denis Villeneuve, Jason Priestley, Jeremy Podeswa, Kari Skogland, Sheila McCarthy.

2010 Winners:

- Best Short Film – Adam Shamash – La Khaima – The Tent of Mile-End
- Achievement in Direction – Adam Shamash – La Khaima: The Tent of Mile-End
- Achievement in Cinematography – Shervin Kermani and Aita Jason – Sofia
- Achievement in Animation – King Mugabi – Red Snow

Awards were presented October 13 at the Drake Hotel.

== 2011 ==
2011 Jury: Atom Egoyan, Don Carmody, Emmanuelle Chriqui, Molly Parker, Jean-Marc Vallée.

2011 Winners:

- Best Short Film – Miles Jay and Orlee-Rose Strauss, Blink
- Achievement in Direction – Miles Jay – Blink
- Achievement in Animation – Timothy Chan – A Starry Night A Starry Night
- Achievement in Cinematography – Rhonda's Party

== 2012 ==
2012 Jury: Jay Baruchel, Niv Fichman, Mary Harron, Alison Pill, Gordon Pinsent, Callum Keith Rennie, Saul Rubinek, Jacob Tierney and Karine Vanasse.

2012 Winners:

- Best Short Film – Fernand-Philippe Morin-Vargas, Noeud papillon
- Achievement in Direction – Alexander Carson, We Refuse to Be Cold
- Achievement in Cinematography – Danielle Sahota and Davina Rimmer, We Blinded the Sun
- Achievement in Documentary – Justin Friesen, Let's Make Lemonade
- People's Choice Award – Justin Friesen, Let's Make Lemonade

The 2012 gala was held at the Panorama Lounge in Toronto with Master of Ceremonies Ben Mulroney. In 2012, the winner of the best film award received a cash prize of $5,000 and a paid trip to the Clermont-Ferrand International Short Film Festival.

== 2013 ==
2013 Jury: Suzanne Clément, Enrico Colantoni, Wendy Crewson, Sarah Gadon, Evan Goldberg, Martin Katz, Michael McGowan, Chloé Robichaud.

2013 Winners:

- Best Short Film – Andrew Moir, Just As I Remember
- Achievement in Direction – Sophie Jarvis, The Worst Day Ever
- Achievement in Cinematography – Roman Tchjen and Vaishni Majoomdar, Walk the Moon
- Achievement in Animation – Eileen Peng, Godfather Death

== 2014 ==
2014 Jury: Don McKellar, Louise Archambault, Jennifer Baichwal, Luc Déry, Michael Fukushima, Guy Maddin, Gia Milani, Andrew Moir, Jennifer Podemski, Laura Vandervoort.

2014 Winners

- Best Short Film – Yassmina Karajah, David Findlay, Jenna Hambrook and Benjamin Houde-Hostland, Light
- Achievement in Direction – Yassmina Karajah, Light
- Achievement in Cinematography – Alfonso Herrera Salcedo, Les enfants sauvages
- Achievement in Animation – Raquel Sancinetti, Cycle
- Achievement in Documentary – Russell Ratt-Brascoupe, The Hearing
- People's Choice Award – Michaela Kurimsky and Leanna Kruse, Alouette

== 2015 ==
2015 Jury: Tatiana Maslany, John Galway, François Girard, Sophie Desmarais, Yassmina Karajah, Ron Mann, Ruba Nadda, Catherine O'Hara, Julie Roy and Albert Shin

2015 Winners

- Best Short Film – Caitlin Durlak, Persistence of Vision
- Achievement in Direction – Kevin Landry, (A)LONE
- Achievement in Cinematography – Haya Waseem and Christopher Lew, Familiar
- Achievement in Animation – Catherine Dubeau, Kaleidoscope
- Achievement in Documentary – Taylor Gordon and Nigil Vazquez, I'm Still Embarrassed
- People's Choice Award – Kristina Mileska and Andy Kloske, Asteroid

== 2016 ==
2016 Jury: Patricia Rozema, Jennifer Baichwal, Stephen Dunn, Caitlin Durlak, Sarah Gadon, Chris Landreth, Jason Priestley and Karine Vanasse

2016 Winners

- Best Short Film – Kevin T. Landry, Robeth
- Achievement in Direction – Emmanuelle Lacombe, Philippe Lefebvre and Charlotte Lacoursière, French Kiss at the Sugar Shack
- Achievement in Cinematography – Trevor Mack and Matthew Taylor Blais, Clouds of Autumn
- Achievement in Animation – Hands on Deck, Feathers
- Achievement in Documentary – Derrick O'Toole, PC Barfoot and Leila Almawy, The Constant Refugee
- People's Choice Award – Fiona Cleary and Justin MacDonald, Breath of Life
