= Sadie Lundquist =

American ice hockey player (born 1991)

- Born: June 18, 1991 (age 35) Cloquet, Minnesota, United States
- Height: 165 cm (5 ft 5 in)
- Position: Forward
- Shot: Right
- Played for: Minnesota Whitecaps; Bemidji State Beavers
- Playing career: 2009–2019

Sadie Lundquist (born June 18, 1991) is a former American ice hockey executive and retired hockey player who played as a forward. Lundquist last played for the Minnesota Whitecaps of the National Women's Hockey League (NWHL) during her playing career. She then went on to work as a Senior Account Executive, Fan Relations, for the National Hockey League's Minnesota Wild and currently serves as the Deputy Director of College Hockey Inc.

Lundquist has also competed in ice cross downhill events.

== Career ==
Lundquist played high school hockey for Cloquet-Esko-Carlton. From 2009 to 2013, she attended Bemidji State University, scoring 83 points in 144 NCAA games. She served as the team's captain in her senior year.

After graduating, she joined the independent Minnesota Whitecaps. She was one of two Whitecaps players invited to the 3rd NWHL All-Star Game held in Minnesota. She stayed with the Whitecaps as the team joined the NWHL ahead of the 2018-19 season, as the club won the Isobel Cup.

In January 2019, a banner with her number was hung from the rafters at the Northwoods Credit Union Arena in her hometown, honouring her as the first professional women's hockey player from Cloquet. In January 2020, she made an appearance with Team Minneapolis for Hockey Day Minnesota, scoring twice in a 4-3 loss to Team Minnesota.

== Personal life ==
Lundquist began working as a fan relations account executive for the Minnesota Wild after graduating with a bachelor's degree in sports management from Bemidji State. Outside of hockey, her family owns Gordy's Hi-Hat, a burger restaurant in Cloquet. In 2013, she participated in the Red Bull Crashed Ice competition, with her top finish of second place in St. Paul. She also played at the 2018 U.S. Pond Hockey Championships.
