= Trunzo =

Trunzo is a surname. Notable people with the surname include:

- Amanda Trunzo (born 1989), American women's ice hockey player
- Caesar Trunzo (1926–2013), American politician
