= Ice cross downhill =

Extreme winter sport involving downhill racing on ice skates

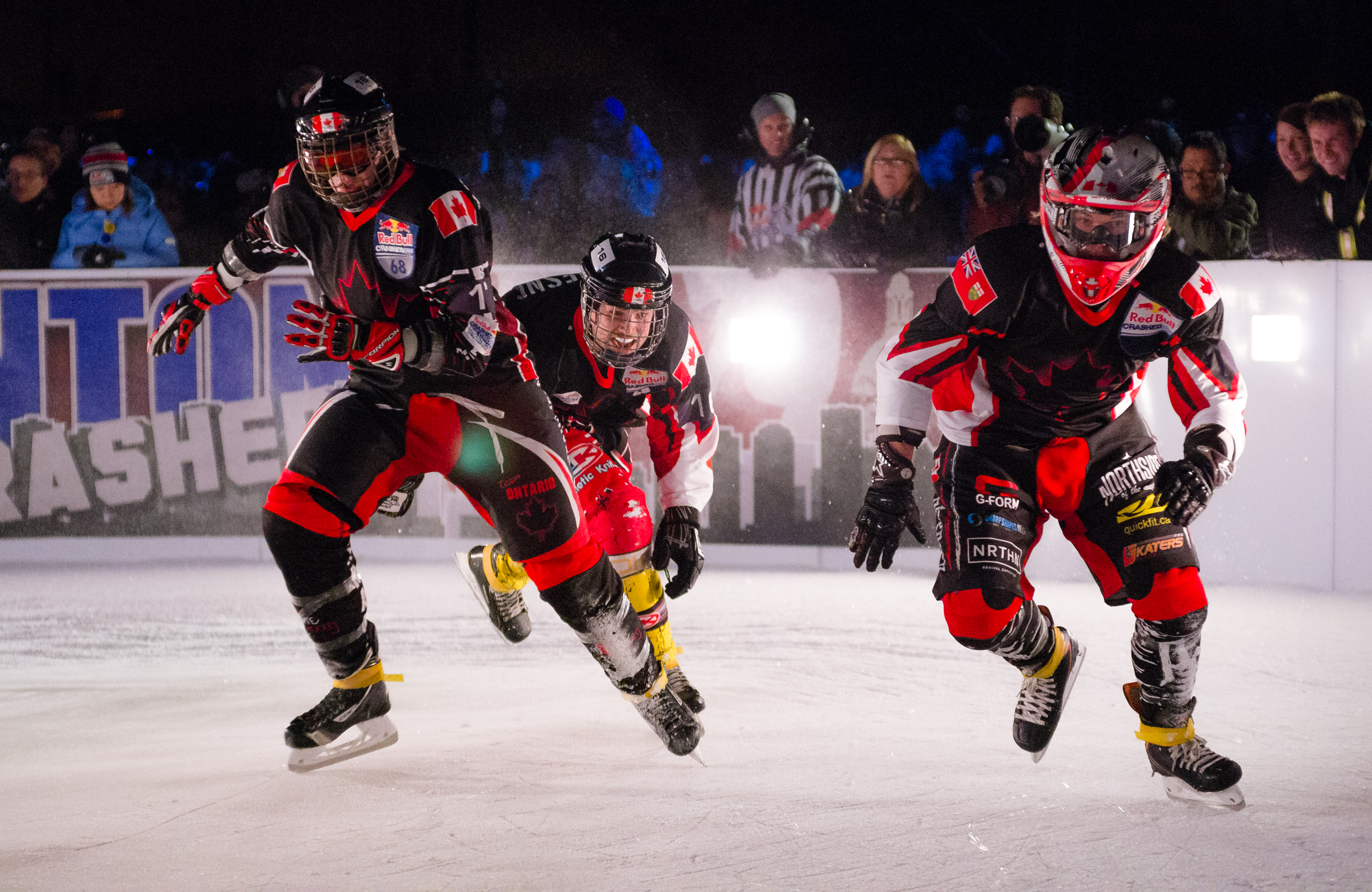
- Red Bull Crashed Ice - Edmonton 2015
- First played: 2001; 25 years ago

Characteristics
- Contact: Incidental
- Type: Racing sport; Ice skating sport; Winter sport; Extreme sport
- Equipment: Ice hockey skates; Bandy skates; Ice hockey equipment; Ringette equipment; Bandy equipment; Other protective gear
- Venue: Downhill ice cross track

Presence
- Olympic: No
- Paralympic: No
- World Games: No

Ice cross downhill is a winter extreme sporting event which involves direct competitive downhill skating on a walled track featuring sharp turns and high vertical drops. Ice cross downhill is similar to ski cross and boardercross, except with ice skates on an ice track, instead of using skis or snowboards on a snow track.

Events were held under the name Red Bull Crashed Ice from 2001 until 2019, and have been sanctioned by the ATSX since 2019.

== Course configurations and equipment ==
=== Courses ===
Contestants race down the course's turns, berms, and jumps. After racing one after another in the time trials, typically there are four racers starting each race.

=== Equipment ===
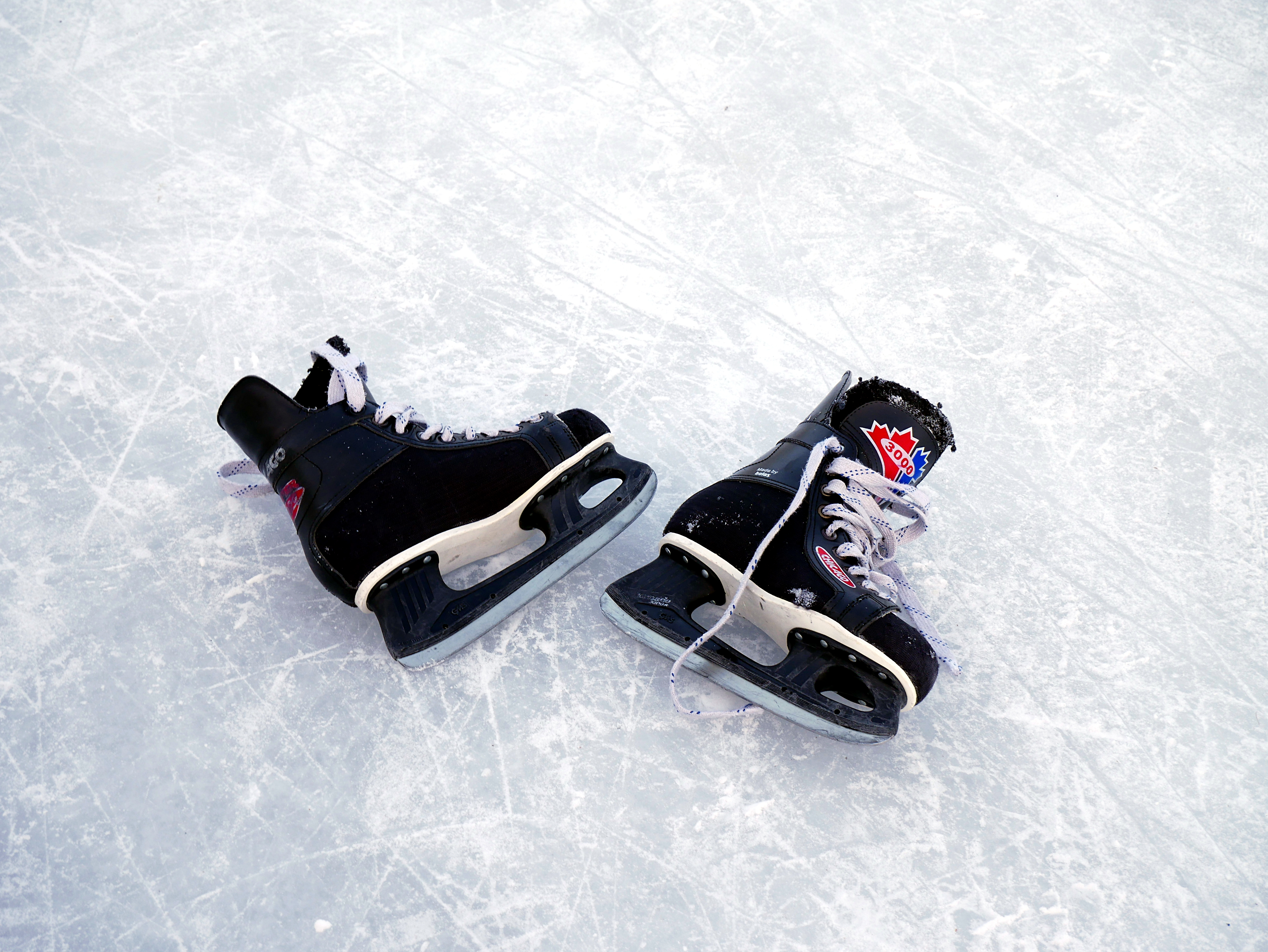
Some racers use ice hockey skates.

Racers wear helmets, ice hockey equipment, bandy equipment, ringette equipment, or in some cases equipment from other sports. Ice hockey skates and bandy skates are used. Ice hockey skates have a design whose blade is cut to create two working edges giving downhill skaters control and the ability to make sharp turns and stops. Bandy skates have flatter, longer blades and typically do not have a tendon guard, however they do not have the same turning ability that ice hockey skates do.

In 2015, Sadie Lundquist discussed the ice cross downhill equipment racers were using during an interview:

Sadie uses her regular hockey equipment, and eschews the GoPro, but she says some of the guys will wear slightly sleeker lacrosse shoulder pads, briefs and shin pads, and some use longer, flatter bandy blades rather than curved [ice] hockey blades. "Bandy blades have twice the surface touching the ice," she explained. "More steel touching the ice is beneficial for stride. You get more push off and they should glide further."

— Sarah Barker, "Hey Boys And Girls: You, Too, Can Skate 40 MPH Downhill Over Jumps", DeadSpin.com

=== Contestants ===
Racers are typically ice hockey players, though ringette players, bandy players, speed skaters, and figure skaters have also competed.

America's seven-time single event winner Jasper Felder is particularly notable. Felder was a bandy player who represented the USA for the United States national bandy team, and while in ice cross downhill, represented Sweden. Finland's Salla Kyhälä has also competed, a ringette player from Finland's national ringette team who also played in Canada's National Ringette League.

== Gallery ==
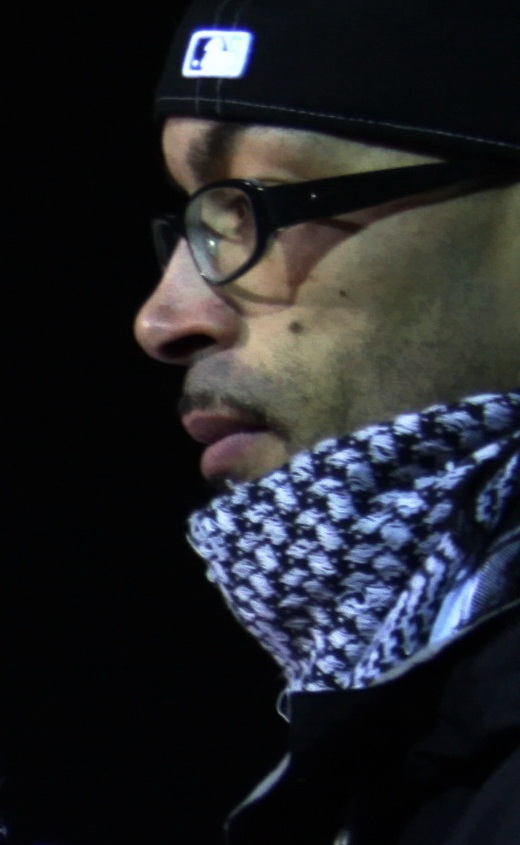
(Sweden) Jasper Felder, a former bandy player, won the single event 7 times

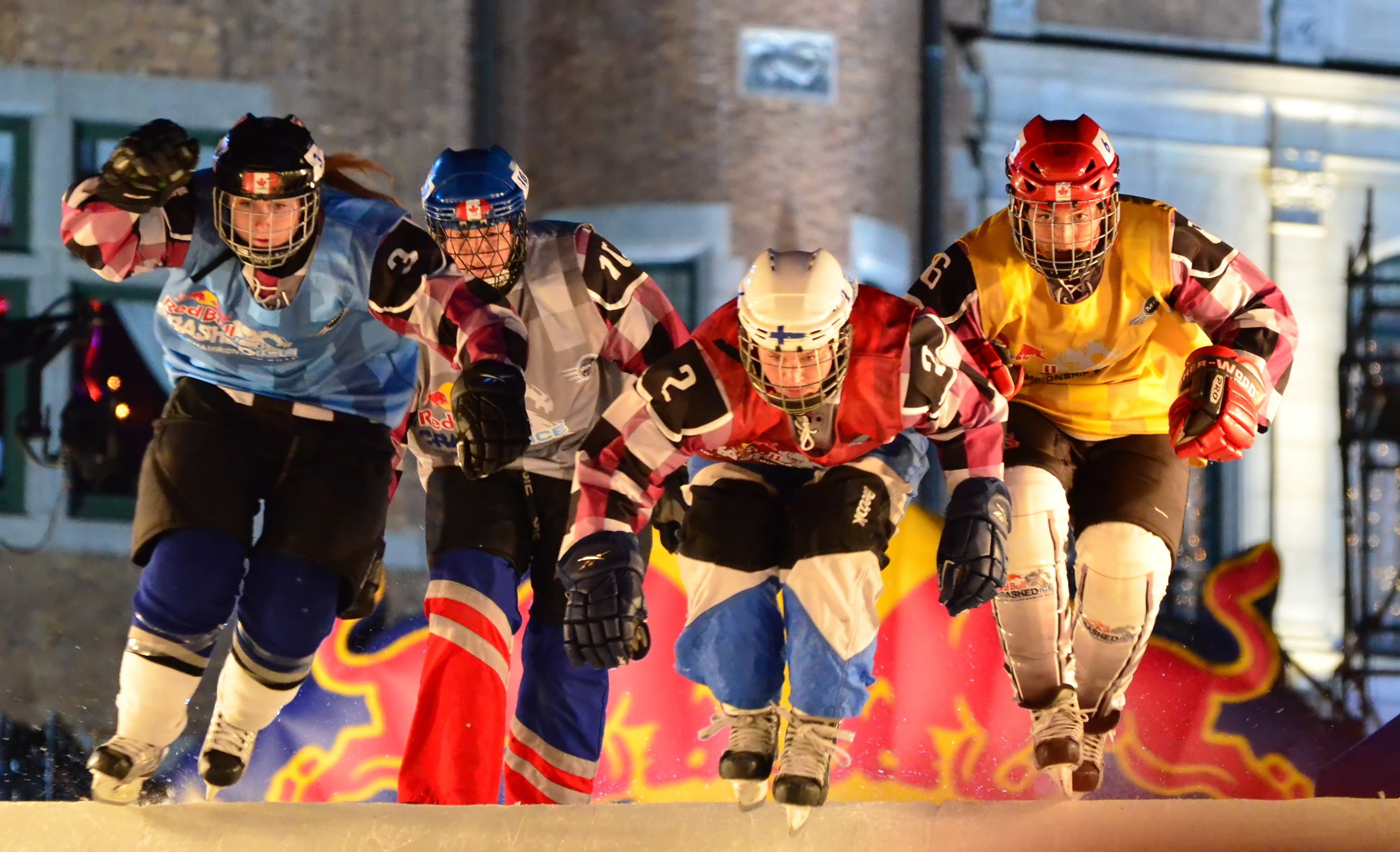
(Finland) Salla Kyhälä, a former ringette player, (second from right)

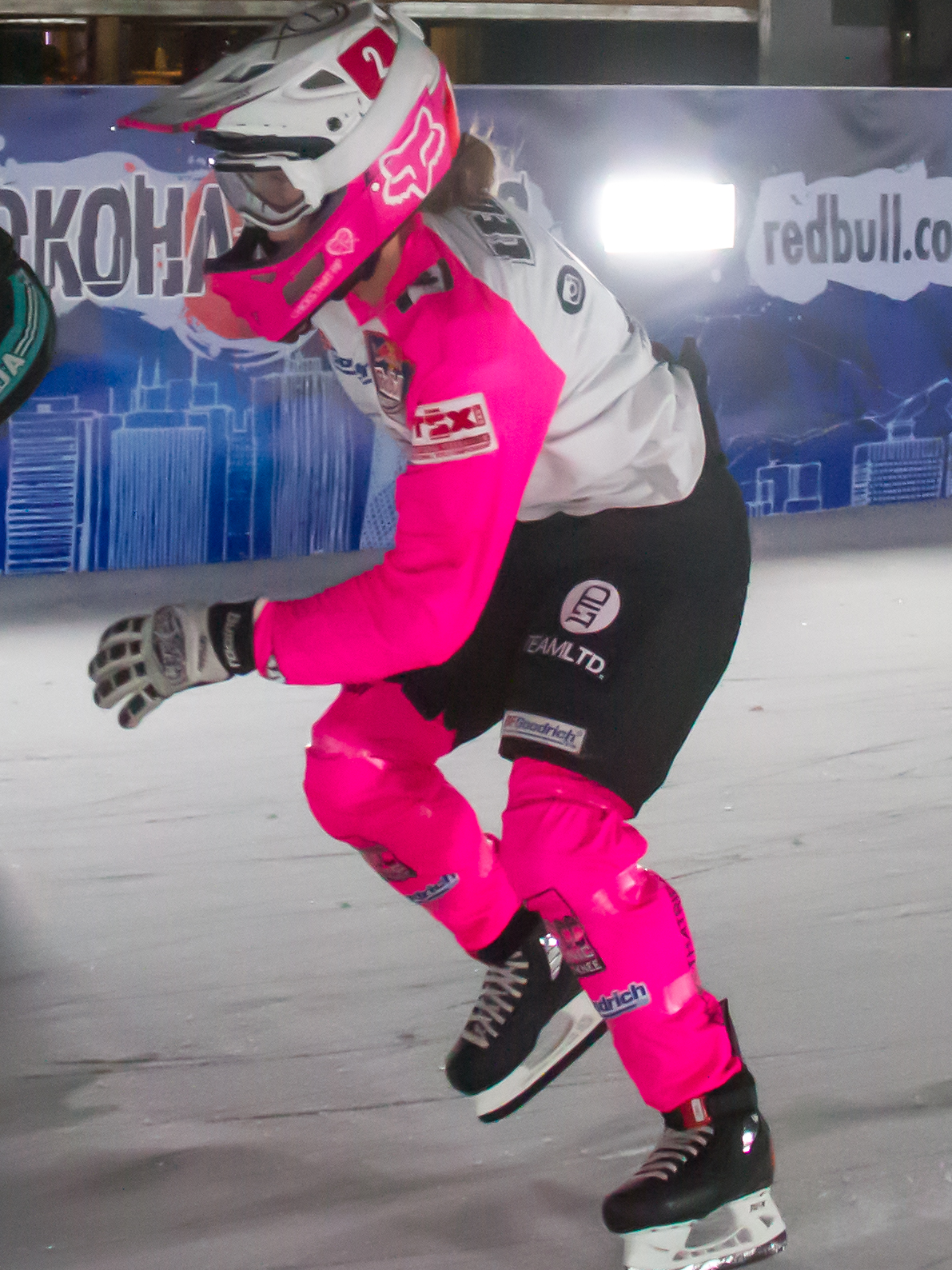
(Canada) Jacqueline Legere, a former women's ice hockey player, is also a Canadian stuntwoman

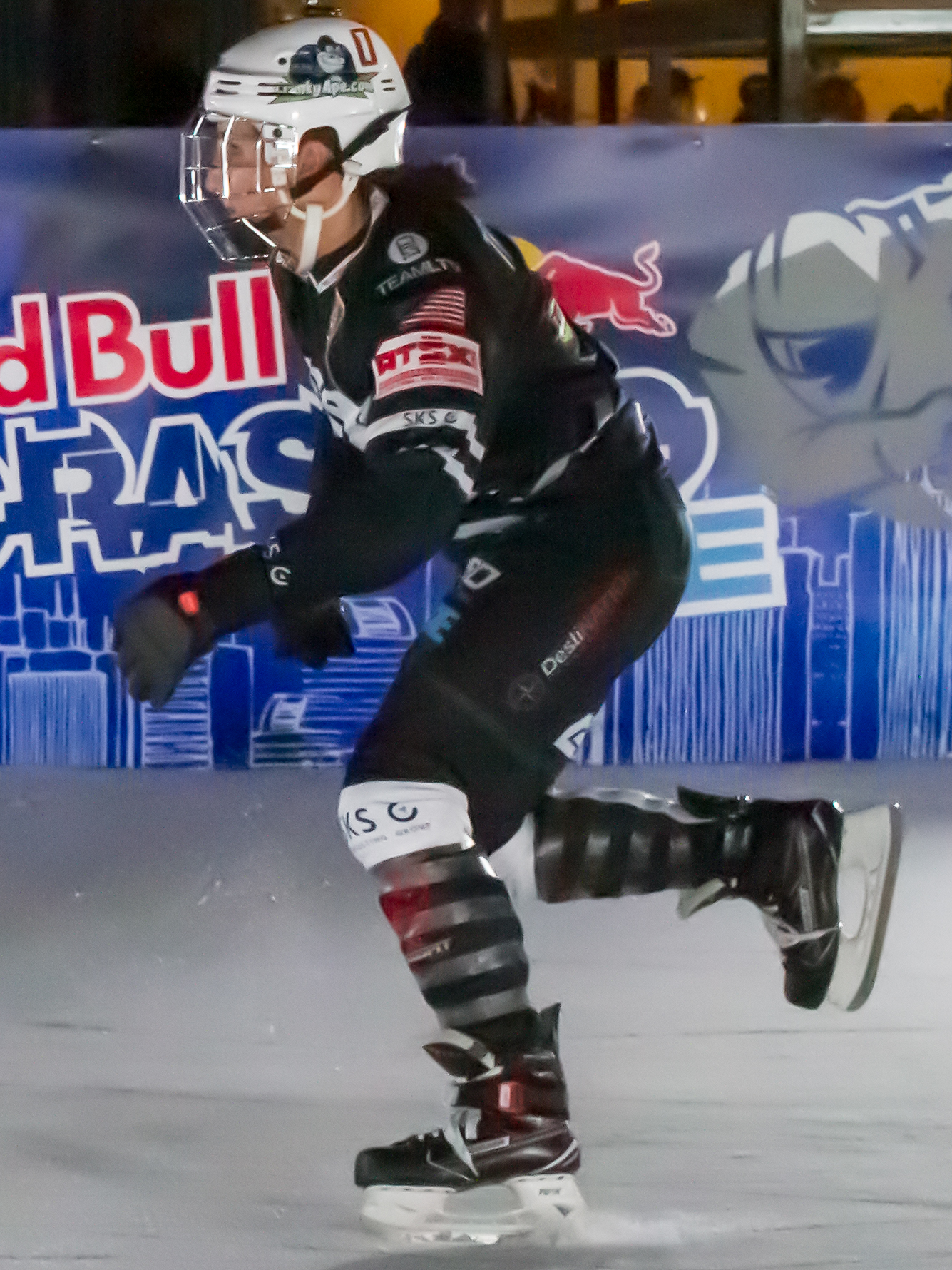
(United States) Amanda Trunzo, a former women's ice hockey player

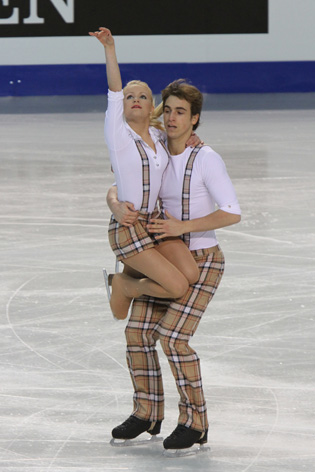
(Switzerland) Anaïs Morand, a former pairs figure skater, has also raced

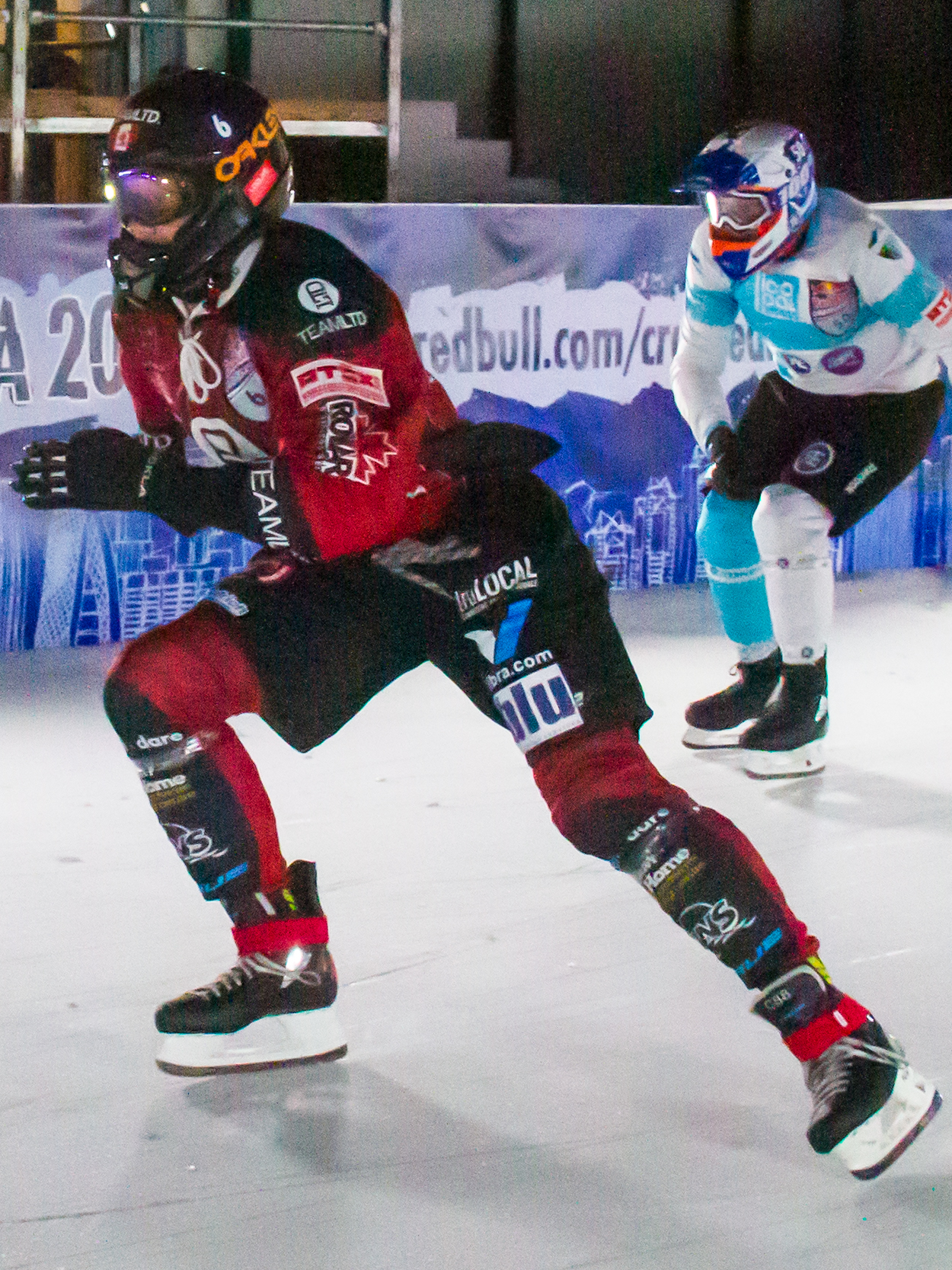
(Canada) Kyle Croxall, a former ice hockey player

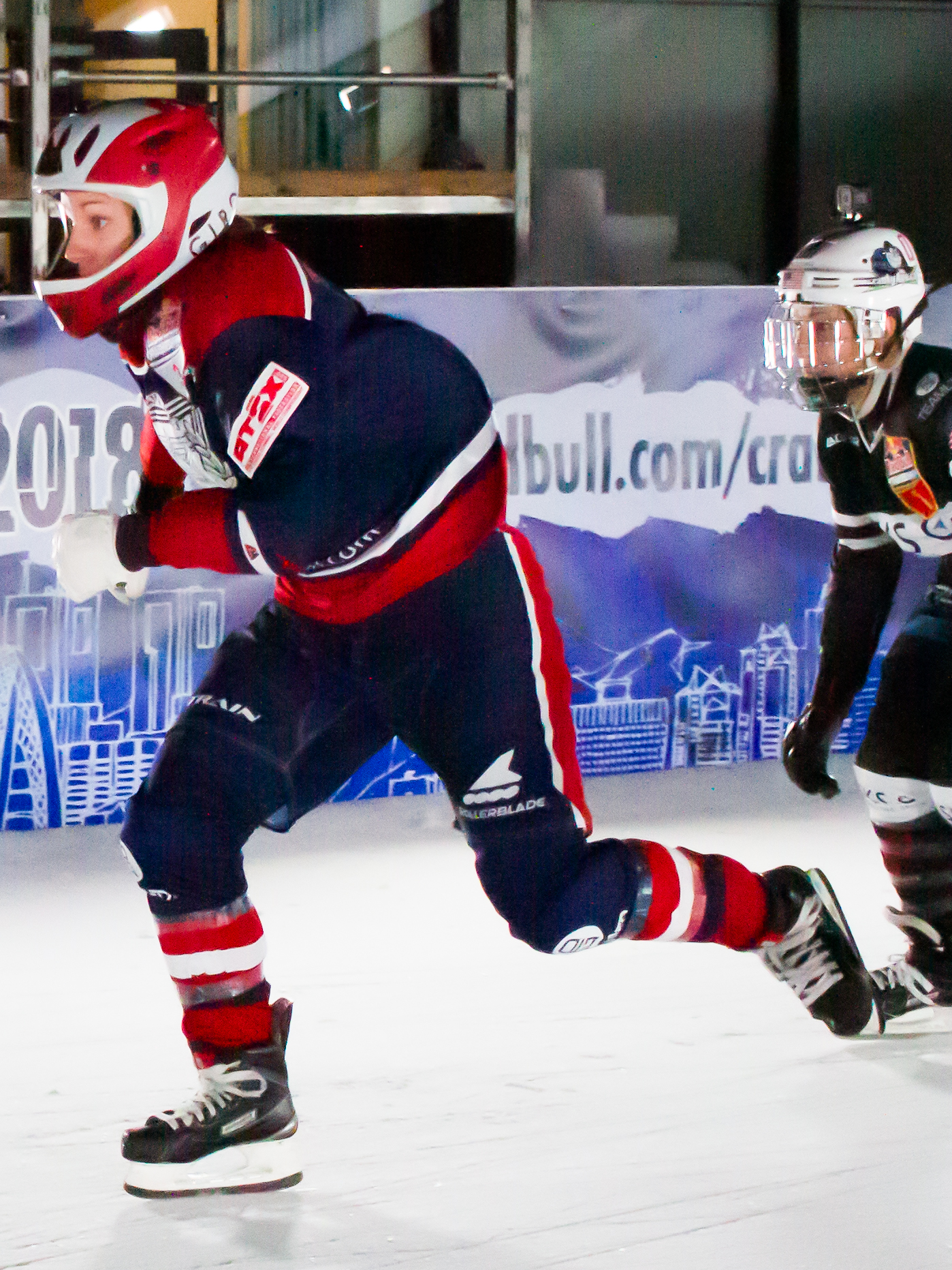
(Canada) Myriam Trépanier, a former ice hockey player

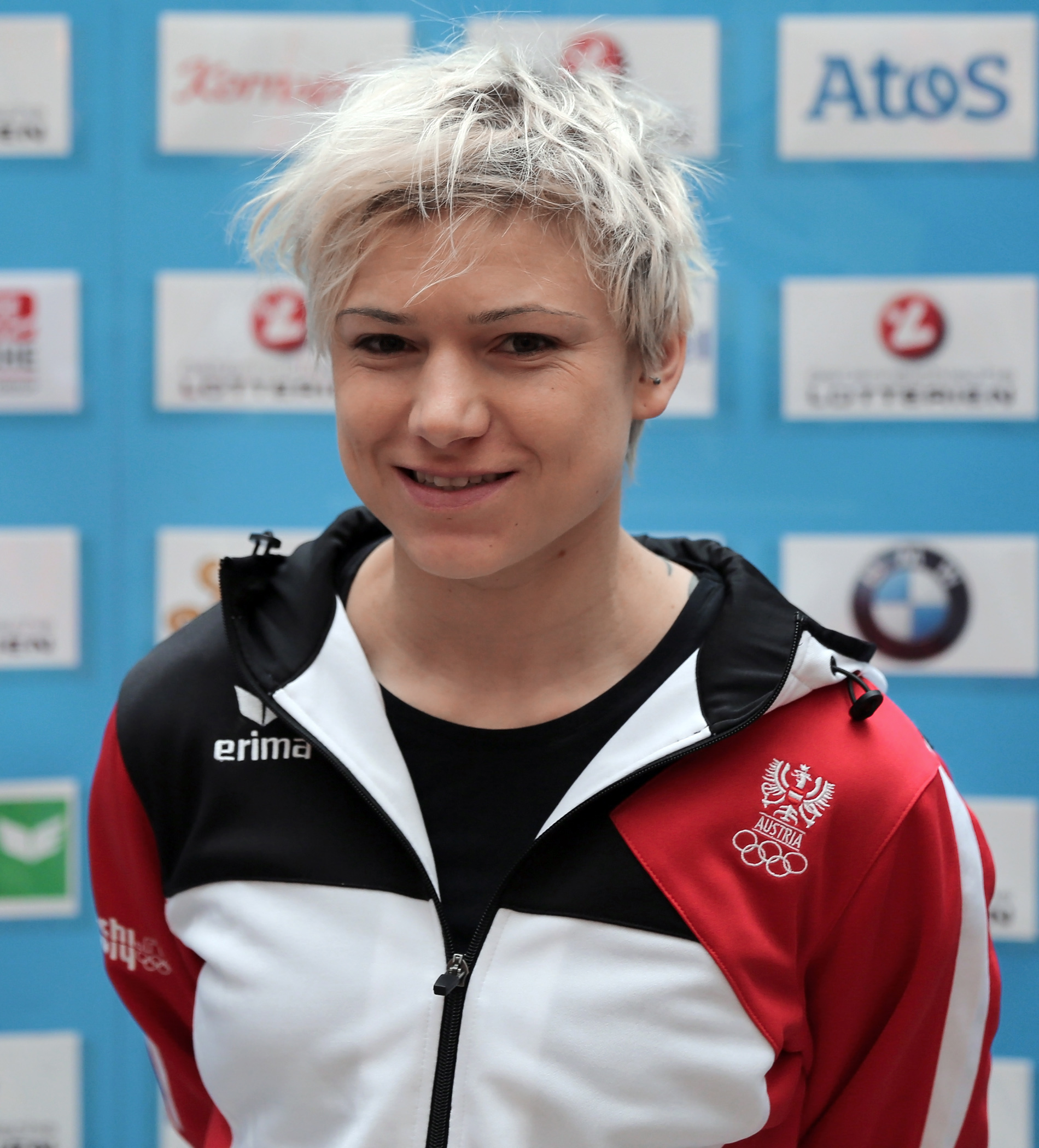
(Austria) Veronika Windisch, a short track speed skater

== See also ==
- Tour skating
- Speed skating
- Short track speed skating
- Ice hockey
- Bandy
- Ringette
- Figure skating
- Skate cross
