= Portraits from a Fire =

2021 Canadian comedy-drama film

- Directed by: Trevor Mack
- Written by: Trevor Mack; Manny Mahal; Derek Vermillion
- Produced by: Rylan Friday; Kate Kroll; Trevor Mack
- Starring: William Lulua; Nathaniel Arcand; Asivak Koostachin
- Cinematography: Kaayla Whachell
- Edited by: Elad Tzadok
- Music by: Andrew Dixon; Conan Karpinski
- Production companies: Portraits from a Fire Productions; Black Moon Media; Elemental Studios
- Distributed by: Photon Films and Media
- Release date: October 3, 2021 (VIFF)
- Running time: 92 minutes
- Country: Canada
- Languages: English; Tsilhqot’in
- Budget: $525,000 CAD

Portraits from a Fire is a Canadian comedy-drama film, directed by Trevor Mack and released in 2021. The first narrative feature film written and directed by a Tsilhqot'in filmmaker, the film stars William Magnus Lulua as Tyler, an amateur filmmaker living with his father Gord (Nathaniel Arcand) on a Tsilhqotʼin reserve in northern British Columbia, whose life is upended following the revelation of a long-hidden family secret.

The cast also includes Asivak Koostachin as Aaron, as well as Sammy Stump, Pauline Bob-King, Melanie Bobby, Leighton Bingham, Kacin Hance and Crystal Harry in supporting roles.

== Production ==
The film was shot in 2019 on Tl'etinqox-t'in territory around the community of Anaham.

Mack has indicated that the film was inspired by a desire to tell a First Nations story that had nothing to do with colonialism or the Indian residential school system, as well as by a desire to reclaim the Tsilhqot’in language, which during his early life was typically spoken by people in the community only when they needed to discuss something they did not want their children to hear or understand.

Many of the supporting roles in the film are performed by local residents of Anaham rather than professional actors.

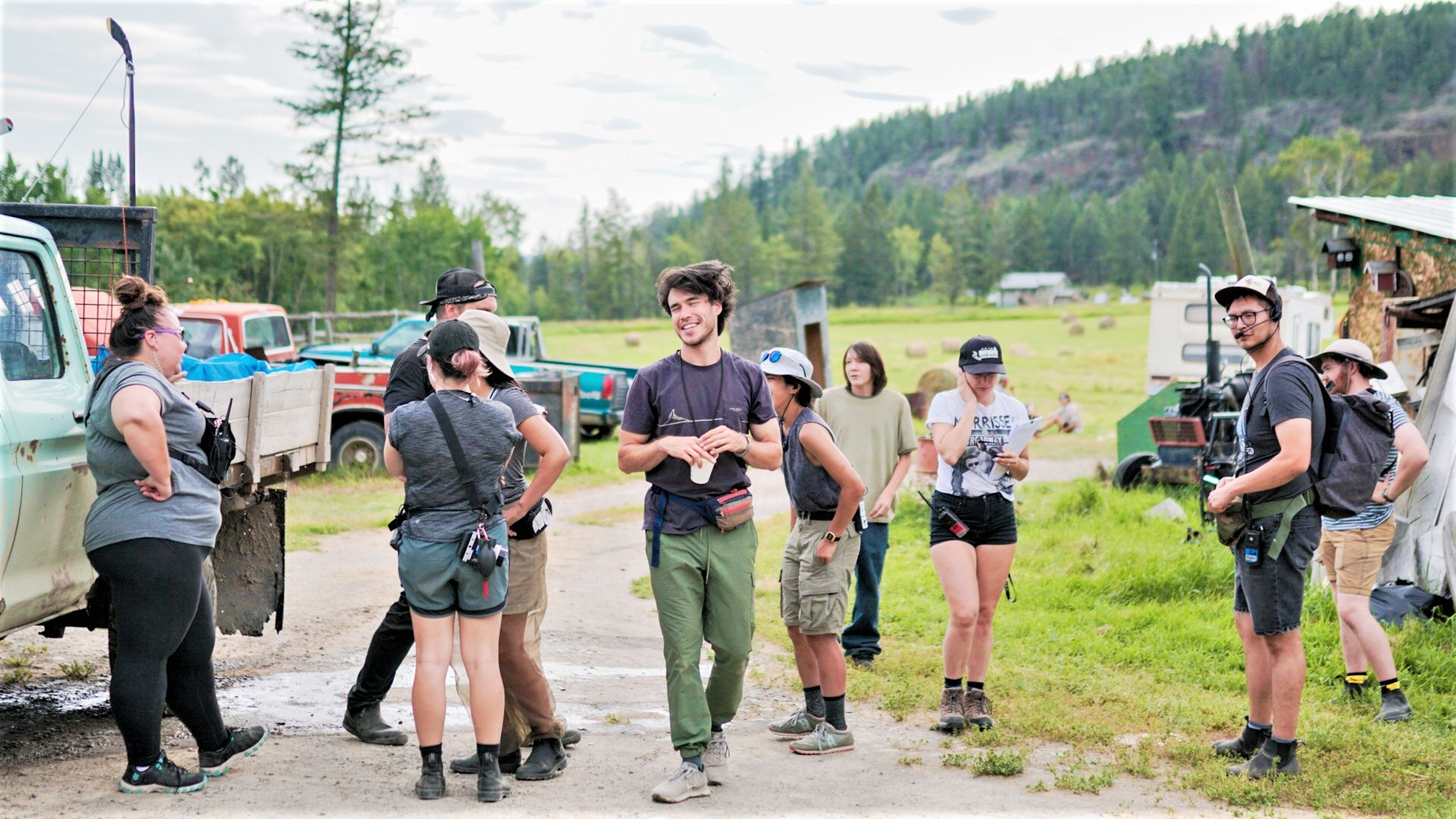
Trevor Mack, center, directing on the set of Portraits from a Fire.

== Distribution ==
The film had its official theatrical premiere on October 3, 2021 at the 2021 Vancouver International Film Festival, although it was screened on the online platforms of the 2021 Cinéfest Sudbury International Film Festival and the FIN Atlantic Film Festival in September.

It was also selected as the opening film of the 2021 Edmonton International Film Festival, and was screened at the 2021 ImagineNATIVE Film and Media Arts Festival, and the 2021 American Indian Film Festival.

It premiered commercially on November 1.

== Critical response ==
Alisha Mughal of Exclaim! rated the film 8/10, writing that "Wachell's cinematographic storytelling is equally complemented by Mack's endlessly interesting telling of Tyler's past: his mother appears to Tyler as though she were a figure on a damaged VHS tape, her face constantly on the edge of comprehension. At times, Tyler veritably steps into her story as though stepping onto a film's set. This blurring of the line between reality and representations of reality, vague memories you think are yours, do a brilliant job of showing the story without telling and without belabouring the point. Ultimately, Mack shows in his visual style how the past really is passed down through bloodlines so it becomes intuition, how generational pain will survive until someone does something about it, how secrets kept hurt more than the truth ever can, and how art can save so many lives."

Jim Slotek of Original Cin rated the film B+, writing that "Portraits From a Fire is a sweet movie, with flashes of digital artiness, some dark moments and nicely drawn characters with a shared wry sense of humour. The location shoot, the Tl'etinqox (Anaham) Reserve, adds to the atmosphere with its lived-in reality. There’s a working-class hominess to it that could stand for small towns anywhere in Canada. Except this one’s called a 'rez'."

For the National Post, Chris Knight rated the film 3.5/5, writing that "Portraits from a Fire boasts some superb production values in the larger film, but wrapped around a simple, heartfelt tale that is clearly close to the heart of its 29-year-old director. Tyler may mispronounce the name of the French film festival as “Khan-ness,” but Mack surely knows how to say it. And I wouldn’t be surprised to run into him there one day."

== Awards ==
| Award | Date of ceremony | Category | Recipient | Result | Ref. |
|---|---|---|---|---|---|
| American Indian Film Festival | 2021 | Best Director | Trevor Mack | Won | |
| American Indian Film Festival | 2021 | Best Supporting Actor | Asivak Koostachin | Won | |
| CAFTCAD Awards | 2022 | Best Costume Design in an Independent Feature | Florence Barrett | Nominated | |
| Directors Guild of Canada | 2021 | DGC Discovery Award | Trevor Mack | Nominated | |
| Edmonton International Film Festival | 2021 | Best Canadian Feature Film | Portraits from a Fire | Won | |
| Indiescreen Awards | 2022 | Kevin Tierney Emerging Producer Award | Trevor Mack, Kate Kroll, Rylan Friday | Won | |
| Leo Awards | 2022 | Best Picture | Trevor Mack, Kate Kroll, Rylan Friday | Won | |
| Leo Awards | 2022 | Best Director | Trevor Mack | Won | |
| Leo Awards | 2022 | Best Cinematography | Kaayla Wachell | Won | |
| Leo Awards | 2022 | Best Costume Design | Florence Barrett | Nominated | |
| Leo Awards | 2022 | Best Editing | Elad Tzadok | Won | |
| Leo Awards | 2022 | Best Musical Score | Conan Karpinski, Andrew Dixon | Won | |
| Leo Awards | 2022 | Best Sound | Matt Drake, Nolan McNaughton | Nominated | |
| Vancouver Film Critics Circle | 2021 | Best British Columbia Film | Portraits from a Fire | Won | |
| Vancouver Film Critics Circle | 2021 | One to Watch | Trevor Mack | Won | |
| Vancouver International Film Festival | 2021 | Best BC Emerging Filmmaker | Trevor Mack | Won | |
