= Anaïs Morand =

Swiss pair skater

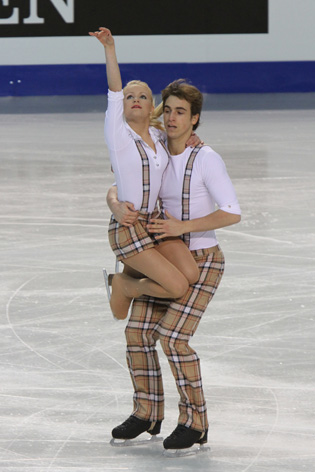
- Morand and Dorsaz in 2010

Personal information
- Full name: Anaïs Morand
- Born: 10 March 1993 (age 33) Vouvry, Switzerland
- Home town: Zurich, Switzerland
- Height: 1.53 m (5 ft 0 in)

Figure skating career
- Country: Switzerland
- Skating club: CPA Monthey
- Began skating: 1999

Medal record
Swiss Championships
Gold medal – first place	2008 Winterthur	Pairs
Gold medal – first place	2009 La Chaux-de-Fonds	Pairs
Gold medal – first place	2010 Lugano	Pairs
Gold medal – first place	2011 Zug	Pairs
Gold medal – first place	2012 Basel	Pairs

Anaïs Morand (born 10 March 1993) is a Swiss pair skater and Red Bull Crashed Ice competitor in the sport of ice cross downhill. Competing in pairs with Antoine Dorsaz, she skated at seven ISU Championships, achieving their best result (8th) at the 2010 Europeans, and at the 2010 Winter Olympics (15th). In 2011 and 2012, she competed at three ISU Championships with Timothy Leemann. She is the 2018 Crans-Montana Riders Cup Ice Cross champion.

== Career ==
=== Figure skating ===
Morand teamed up with Antoine Dorsaz in 2006. They spent their first two seasons together on the junior circuit. In 2008–09 they competed in both juniors and seniors, finishing 12th at the European Championships and 10th at the World Junior Championships. They were not able to qualify a spot for Switzerland for the Winter Olympics.

Morand and Dorsaz began the 2009–10 season at the 2009 Nebelhorn Trophy, where they qualified a spot for Switzerland at the 2010 Winter Olympics. They continued to skate on the junior Grand Prix circuit and moved up to 8th at the European Championships. They were 15th at the Olympics and moved up to 13th at Worlds. Dorsaz retired from competitive skating after the 2010 season, citing lack of motivation. It was then announced that Morand would compete in ladies' single skating until she found a new partner. She later teamed up with Timothy Leemann, but did compete in the ladies' event at the Junior Grand Prix Austria in Graz, finishing in 25th place. In July 2012, it was reported that their partnership had ended.

=== Ice cross ===
In 2015, Morand began competing in ice cross downhill.

== Programs ==
=== With Leemann ===
Season	Short program	Free skating
2011–2012	Eclipse (from Cirque du Soleil)	Drum and Techno Mix by Safri Duo
2010–2011	James Bond (soundtrack)	Drum and Techno Mix by Safri Duo

=== Singles career ===
Season	Short program	Free skating
2010–2011	Two Guitars by Paul Mauriat	Irma la Douce by André Previn

=== With Dorsaz ===
Season	Short program	Free skating
2008–2010	Bohemian Rhapsody by Queen	Once Upon a Time in America by Ennio Morricone
2007–2008	Réveil (from Cirque du Soleil's Quidam) by Benoît Jutras	Carmen by Georges Bizet
2006–2007	Cirque du Soleil by René Dupéré	Ouverture (from The Haunted Mansion) by Mark Mancina

== Competitive highlights ==
JGP: Junior Grand Prix

=== Single skating ===
International
Event	2010–11	2012–13
JGP Austria	25th	
National
Swiss Championships		18th

=== Pair skating with Leeman ===
International
Event	2010–11	2011–12
World Championships		18th
European Championships		14th
International: Junior
World Junior Champ.	12th	
JGP Austria		13th
Bavarian Open		2nd
National
Swiss Championships	1st	1st

=== Pair skating with Dorsaz ===
International
Event	2006–07	2007–08	2008–09	2009–10
Olympics				15th
World Champ.			14th	13th
European Champ.			12th	8th
Nebelhorn Trophy				5th
International: Junior or novice
Junior Worlds	11th	12th	10th	
JGP Belarus			6th	
JGP Czech Republic	10th		8th	
JGP Estonia		15th		
JGP Germany				4th
JGP Norway	9th			
JGP United Kingdom		14th		
JGP United States				6th
National
Swiss Champ.	1st J	1st	1st	1st
