= Kyle Croxall =

Canadian Red Bull Crashed Ice racer

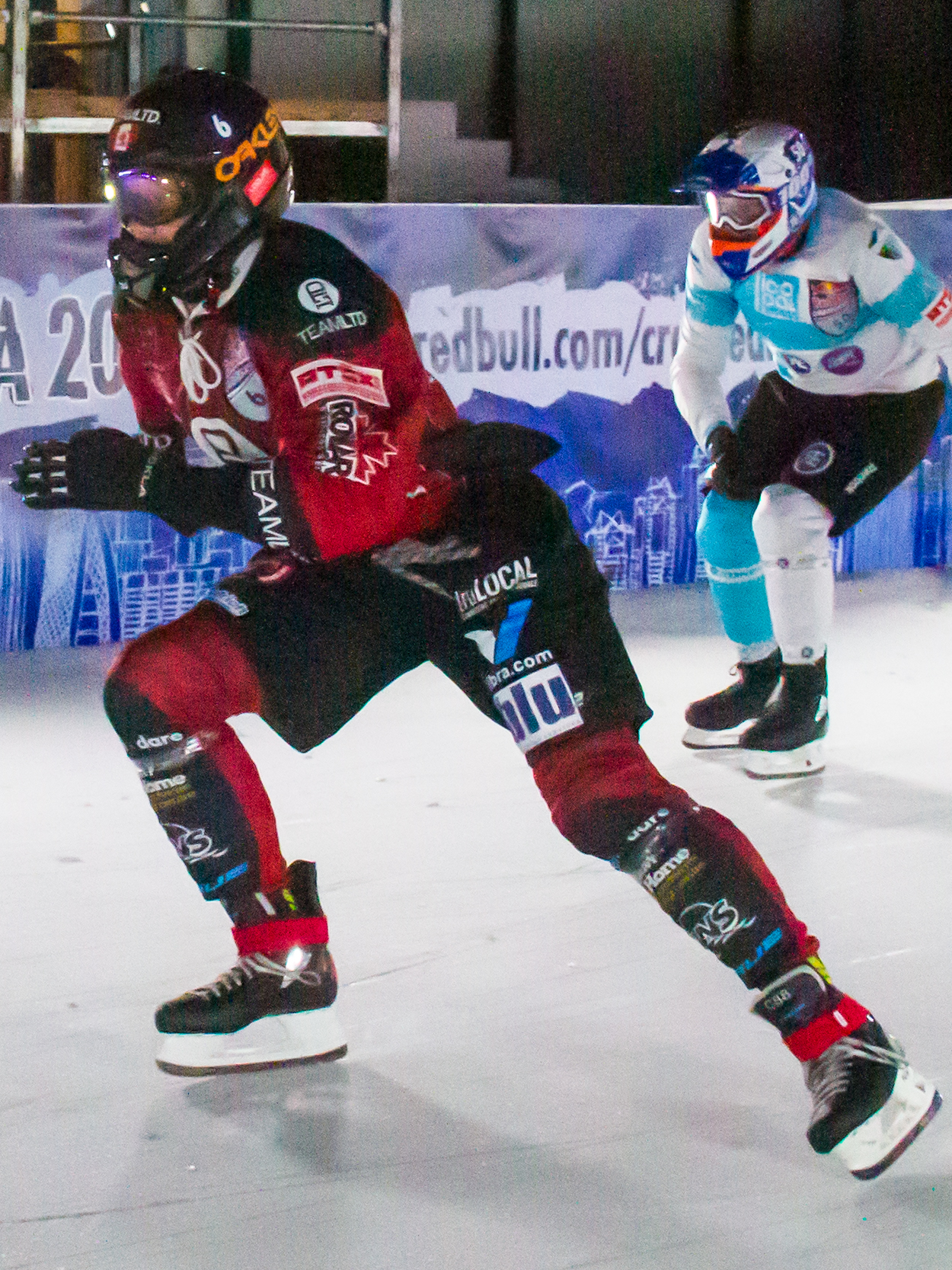

Personal information
- Nickname: Croxy
- Born: 26 October 1988 (age 37) Mississauga, Ontario, Canada
- Home town: Toronto, Ontario

Sport
- Sport: Ice Cross Downhill
- Team: Living the Dream (LTD)
Medal record
Red Bull Crashed Ice Races
Gold medal – first place	2010 Quebec City	Individual
Gold medal – first place	2011 Munich	Individual
Bronze medal – third place	2011 Valkenburg	Individual
Silver medal – second place	2011 Moscow	Individual
Bronze medal – third place	2011 Quebec City	Individual
Gold medal – first place	2012 Saint Paul	Individual
Gold medal – first place	2012 Valkenburg	Individual
Silver medal – second place	2012 Quebec City	Individual
Gold medal – first place	2013 Niagara Falls	Individual
Gold medal – first place	2013 Saint Paul	Individual
World Championships
Silver medal – second place	2010 Red Bull Crashed Ice	Individual
Silver medal – second place	2011 Red Bull Crashed Ice	Individual
Gold medal – first place	2012 Red Bull Crashed Ice	Individual
Silver medal – second place	2013 Red Bull Crashed Ice	Individual
Bronze medal – third place	2013 Red Bull Crashed Ice	Team
Silver medal – second place	2014 Red Bull Crashed Ice	Team
- Updated on 23 March 2014

Kyle Croxall (born October 26, 1988) is a Canadian Red Bull Crashed Ice (also known as ice cross downhill) racer. In January 2014, he was ranked fourth in the world in the sport. Croxall is a former ice hockey player who played one season with the Mississauga Chargers of the Ontario Junior A Hockey League.

== Crashed ice career ==
Croxall's ice cross downhill career began while he was going to school for firefighting in Ottawa, Ontario. In 2007, tryouts were being held there. Croxall said, "I had previously seen the sport on TV and wanted to join." Croxall tried out for Crashed Ice and went on to his first race in Quebec City in 2008. Croxall now competes on the Red Bull Crashed Ice tour for the team known as "Living The Dream".

Croxall has individually been ranked second (2010, 2011, 2013) and first (2012) in the Red Bull Crashed Ice Men's Individual World Championship rankings. As part of the "Living The Dream" team, he has been ranked third (2013) and second (2014) in the Red Bull Crashed Ice Team World Championship rankings. Apart from the world championship rankings, he has six first-place finishes, two second-place finishes and two third-place finishes in Men's Individual Races.

== Personal life ==
Croxall was born in Mississauga, Ontario, and he is residing in Toronto. He is now a firefighter with the Toronto Fire Services. His brother, Scott Croxall, is also an ice cross downhill athlete.
