= AP Restaurant =

Restaurant in Toronto, Canada

Coordinates: 43.668586°N 79.388425°W

- Interactive map of AP Restaurant

Restaurant information
- Established: December 2022
- Closed: April 2025
- Owner: Antonio Park
- Head chef: Ted Corrado
- Food type: Asian Fusion; Latin American
- Location: Toronto, Ontario, Canada

AP Restaurant was a restaurant in Toronto, Ontario, Canada that was located on the 51st floor of the Manulife Centre at 55 Bloor Street West.

The space originally opened in 2015 by the Eatertainment restaurant group under the name The One Eighty. Prior to opening, it was formerly occupied by Panorama Lounge.

The One Eighty closed during the COVID-19 pandemic, before the concept was changed and becoming AP Restaurant in December 2022, ran by Antonio Park with Scale Hospitality Group. The restaurant's options included sushi and seafood.

Being a restaurant located so high, it dealt with many challenges, such as smaller delivery sizes, low storage space, and no gas stoves. The restaurant had a dedicated elevator to carry supplies.

The restaurant closed in April 2025.

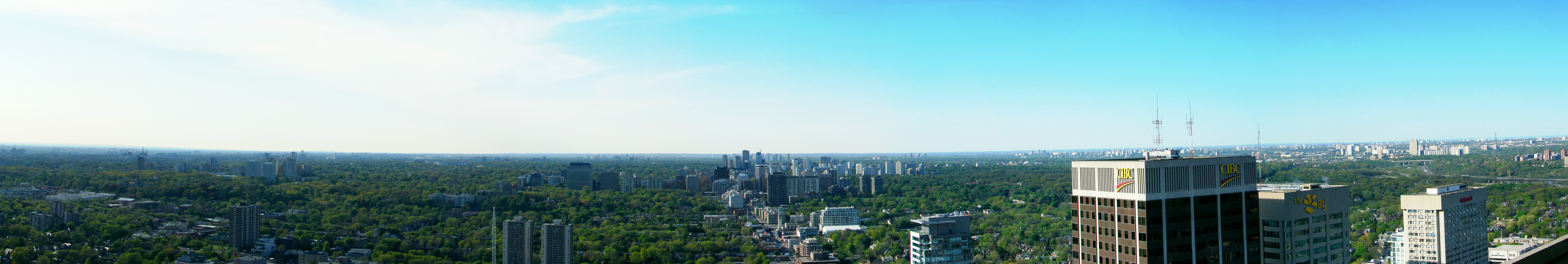
Panoramic view north from Panorama Lounge in the Manulife Centre.
