= Jacqueline Legere =

Canadian stuntwoman and ice cross downhiller

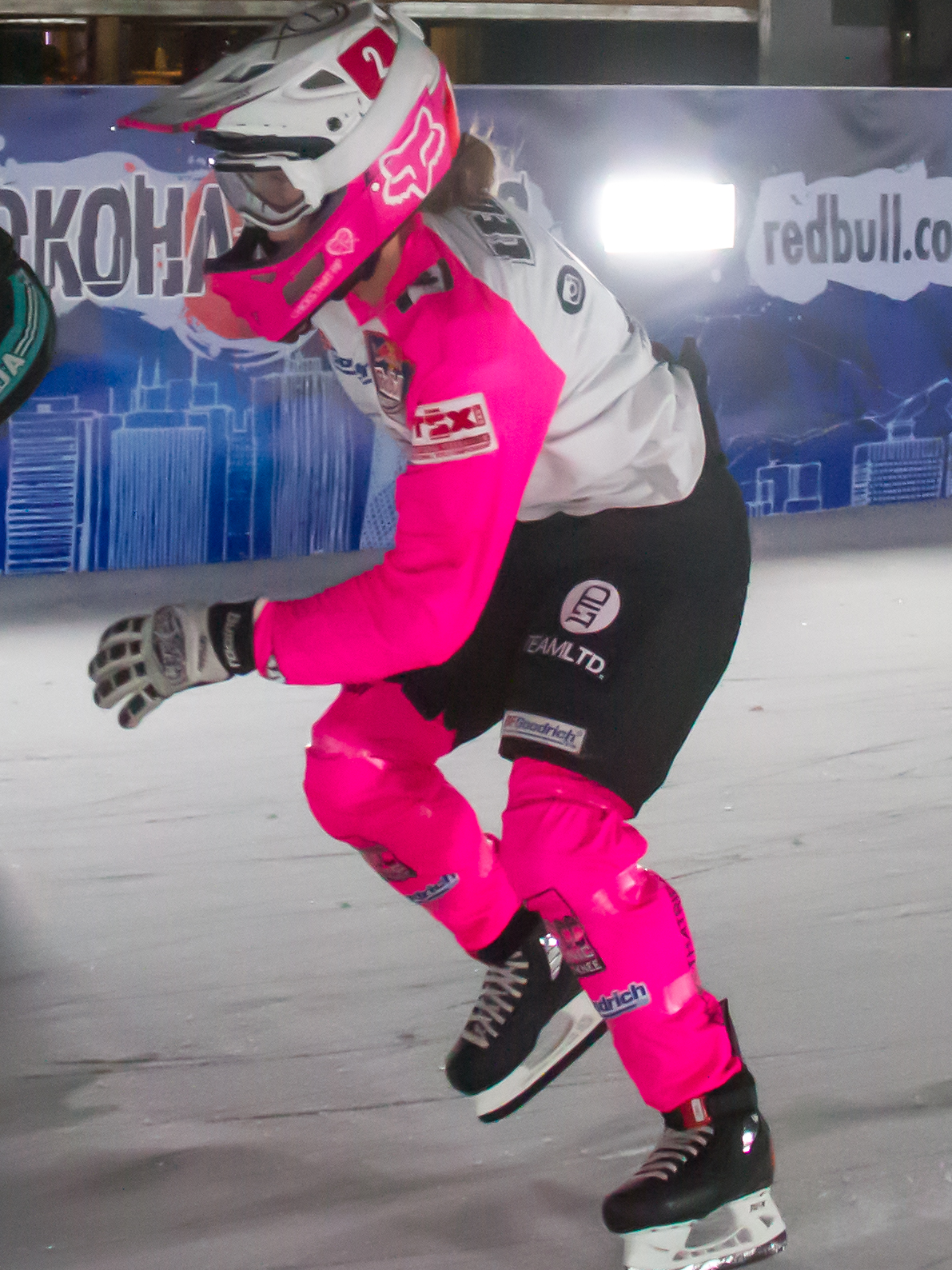

Personal information
- Born: Brantford, Ontario

Sport
- Sport: Ice Cross Downhill
- Team: Independent
Medal record
Red Bull Crashed Ice Races
Silver medal – second place	2015 St. Paul	Individual
Silver medal – second place	2015 Jyvasjyla	Individual
Gold medal – first place	2016 Munich	Individual
Gold medal – first place	2016 St. Paul	Individual
Gold medal – first place	2017 Marseilles	Individual
- Updated on 9 February 2017

Jacqueline Legere (born 1991) is a Canadian stuntwoman and icecross downhill athlete currently competing in Red Bull Crashed Ice. During the 2016 season, Legere finished atop the Crashed Ice standings, emerging as the women’s world champion. When not competing in ice cross downhill, Legere is employed as a stuntwoman.

== Athletic career ==
=== Ice hockey ===
During her teens, Legere competed in Ontario's Provincial Women's Hockey League with the Hamilton Hawks from 2009-11. She also competed in the Lower Lakes Female Hockey League with the Cambridge Roadrunners and won a high school hockey championship in Brant County.

=== Ice cross downhill ===
==== Red Bull Crashed Ice ====
Legere qualified for the Red Bull Crashed Ice race in Quebec City in 2011, making her debut at the event. During the 2015-16 Crashed Ice season, Legere earned a podium finish in every race except for one, finishing in fifth place in Quebec City. Her first win of the season took place on January 8, 2016 in Munich, Germany, beating fellow Canadian Myriam Trepanier, who finished in second.

In the final race of the season, held in St. Paul, Minnesota, she finished first in the race, resulting in a first place overall rank in the world rankings. Fellow Ontario native, Tamara Kajah, a former competitor with the UBC Thunderbirds women’s ice hockey program, finished in third place.

To begin the 2016-17 Crashed Ice season, Legere finished in first place in the opening race, contested in Marseilles, France.
