= Salla Kyhälä =

Former elite Finnish ringette player and downhill ice cross competitor

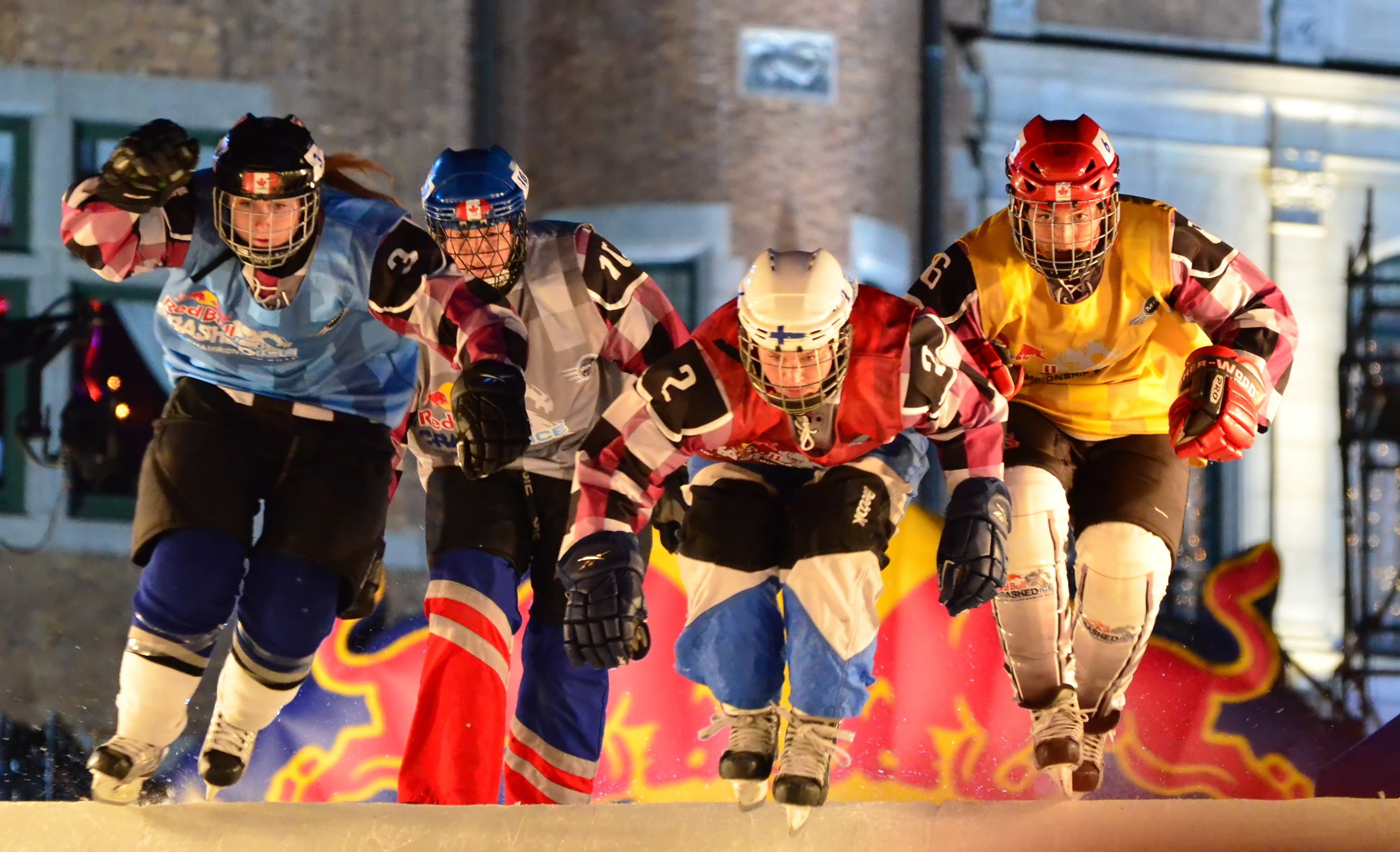
- Ringette player, Kyhälä (3rd from left) at the start of a race during the 2011 edition of the Extreme Downhill Skating World Championships: Red Bull Crashed Ice

Personal information
- Nationality: Finland
- Born: 28 January 1983 (age 43) Ylivieska, Finland

Sport
- Country: Finland; Canada; World
- Position: Centre-Forward
- Shoots: Left
- League: (Finland) SM Ringette; (Canada) National Ringette League
- Team: Team Finland Sr.; (Finland) Espoon Kiekkoseura, SM Ringette; (Canada) BC Thunder, NRL; (Canada) Saskatoon Wild, NRL
Medal record
Event	1st	2nd	3rd
WRC	4	0	0
SMRC (Nationals)	2	?	1
Total	6	0	1
Ringette
World Ringette Championships
Representing Finland
Gold medal – first place	2004 Canada	
Gold medal – first place	2007 Canada	
Gold medal – first place	2010 Finland	
Gold medal – first place	2013 Canada	
SM Ringette Championships (Nationals)
Gold medal – first place	2	
Bronze medal – third place	1	
Ice cross downhill
Crashed ice
Representing Finland
Gold medal – first place	2011 Quebec City, Canada	
Gold medal – first place	2014 Quebec City, Canada	
Gold medal – first place	2015 St. Paul, Minnesota, United States	
- Updated on August 28, 2023

Salla Kyhälä (born January 28, 1983, in Espoo) is a retired elite Finnish ringette player and world champion in both ringette and ice cross downhill. She played semi-pro ringette as a centre for Espoon Kiekkoseura in the elite Finnish semi-professional league, SM Ringette, and the Saskatoon Wild and BC Thunder in Canada's semi-pro National Ringette League. Kyhälä was also a member of the Finland national ringette team several times.

Kyhälä was also the Women's World Champion in the World Extreme Downhill Skating Championships in ice cross downhill (a.k.a. Extreme Downhill Skating) three times.

== Ringette ==
Salla Kyhälä has been playing ringette since she was 6 years old.

=== World Ringette Championships ===
Kyhälä played for the Finland national ringette team under-20 team (U20) in the World Ringette Championships.

At the 2010 World Ringette Championships, in the final game against Canada, she scored four goals giving her country the gold medal and world title.

=== SM Ringette ===
Kyhälä reached the semi-professional ranks in Tuusula in 1999 where she played for three seasons for club Tuusulan ringeten in the SM Ringette league, Finland's elite semi-pro ringette league.

Kyhälä helped her club achieve their first silver medal at the Finnish National Championship in 2000 and their first bronze medal in 2001. She was then traded to club Espoon Kiekkoseura in 2003. In 2005, she was voted among the Kentälliseen All Stars of the elite SM Ringette league.

=== National Ringette League ===
Kyhälä moved to Canada in 2008 to play in the National Ringette League. She played 2 seasons for the Saskatoon Wild and later for the BC Thunder. In 2009, the honour of the most valuable player (Most Valuable Player) was awarded to her by the Canadian league.

=== Statistics ===
==== International ====
Statistics per competition
Year	Event	GP	G	A	Pts	+/-	PIM	Results
2004	World Ringette Championships	?	?	?	?	-	?	(gold) Gold
2007	World Ringette Championships	4	10	8	18	-	0	(gold) Gold
2010	World Ringette Championships	5	14	7	21	-	0	(gold) Gold
2013	World Ringette Championships	?	?	?	?	-	?	(gold) Gold

=== Awards ===
- 2 (SM Ringette) Finnish championship titles (all won with Espoon Kiekkoseura).
- (gold) Gold Medal at the 2007 World Ringette Championships
- (gold) Gold Medal at the 2010 World Ringette Championships

=== Individual honours ===
- Voted to the All-Star Team for the 2004–05 season in Finland's elite semi-pro ringette league, SM Ringette.
- Voted MVP player in the National Ringette League - Canada for the 2008–09 season
- Voted to the 2010 World Ringette Championships All-Star Team

== Extreme downhill skating ==
Kyhälä was a gold medalist at the Red Bull Crashed Ice races in Quebec in 2011 and 2014. In 2015 Kyhälä won the first Extreme Downhill Skating World Championship in women's extreme downhill skating finishing in front of Jacqueline Legere, thanks to her victories at Saint Paul and Edmonton.

== Sources ==
- Quebec Red Bull Crashed ice (in Finnish)

== Notes and references ==
transl. :fr:Salla Kyhälä transl. :fi:Salla Kyhälä

== See also ==
- Ringette
- Downhill ice cross
- Crashed Ice
- World Ringette Championships
- SM Ringette
- National Ringette League
- Marjukka Virta
