= Myriam Trépanier =

Canadian ice hockey player

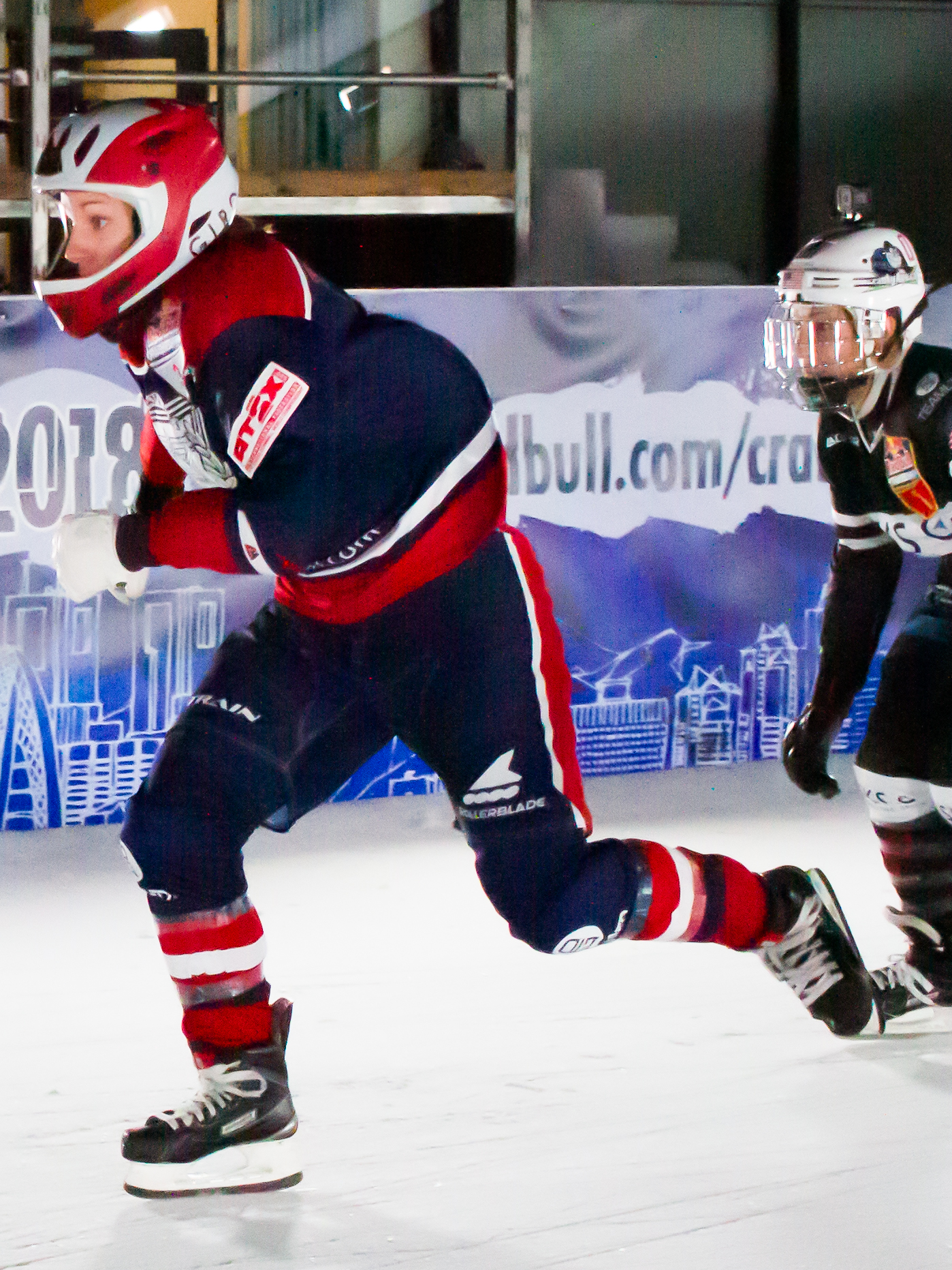
- Born: July 13, 1986 (age 40)
- Height: 5 ft 8 in (173 cm)
- Position: Defence
- WCHA team: Minnesota Duluth Bulldogs
- Playing career: 2003–2009
Medal record
Red Bull Crashed Ice Races
| Gold medal – first place | 2015 Quebec City | Individual |
| Gold medal – first place | 2017 St. Paul | Individual |

Myriam Trépanier (born July 13, 1986) is a former women's ice hockey player with the Minnesota Duluth Bulldogs women's ice hockey program who currently competes in the Red Bull Crashed Ice circuit.

== Athletic career ==
Raised in Saint-Michel-de-Bellechasse, Trépanier was a two-sport star. With Team Quebec, she won a silver medal in women’s ice hockey at the 2003 Canada Winter Games. In addition, she competed in softball at the 2005 Canada Summer Games.

=== Hockey ===
Trépanier played for head coach Shannon Miller at the University of Minnesota Duluth. Statistically, her finest season was in 2007–08. In addition to winning the NCAA Frozen Four title, Trépanier logged career highs in goals (10), assists (21) and points (31). She would play in more than 140 games for the Bulldogs. Her final goal as a Bulldog took on February 27, 2009 against WCHA rival North Dakota.

=== Softball ===
With the UMD Bulldogs softball program, she played for head coach Jen Banford. Competing in the 2007 NCAA Central II Regional Tournament, Trépanier set the program record for best single season on-base percentage (.524 in 2009), also earning the role of starting centerfielder in her senior season.

=== Red Bull Crashed Ice ===
Trépanier's first event in Red Bull Crashed Ice took place in St. Paul, Minnesota in 2014, where she gained a fourth place finish. During the 2015–16 Red Bull Crashed Ice season, Trépanier finished in first place in an event held in November 2015 in Quebec City. She would become the first female competitor born in Quebec to win a Red Bull Crashed Ice competition. Fellow Canadians Maxie Plante and Elaine Topolnisky, who once played with the Minnesota State University-Mankato Mavericks finished second and third in the race. At the end of the season, Trépanier finished third overall in the Crashed Ice standings.

== Career statistics ==
=== NCAA ===
Note: GP= Games played; G= Goals; A= Assists; PTS = Points; PIM = Penalties in minutes; GWG = Game winning goals; PPG = Power Play Goals; SHG = Short Handed Goals

| Season | GP | G | A | Pts | PIM | PPG | SHG | GWG |
| 2005–06 | 28 | 2 | 2 | 4 | | 0 | 0 | 0 |
| 2006–07 | 39 | 5 | 12 | 17 | | 3 | 0 | 0 |
| 2007–08 | 37 | 10 | 21 | 31 | 32 | 4 | 1 | 1 |
| 2008–09 | 38 | 2 | 5 | 7 | 22 | 0 | 0 | 0 |

== Awards and honours ==
- 2007 All North Central Conference honors (softball)
- 2008 NCAA Tournament All-Star selection
