= Crashed Ice =

World tour in ice cross downhill

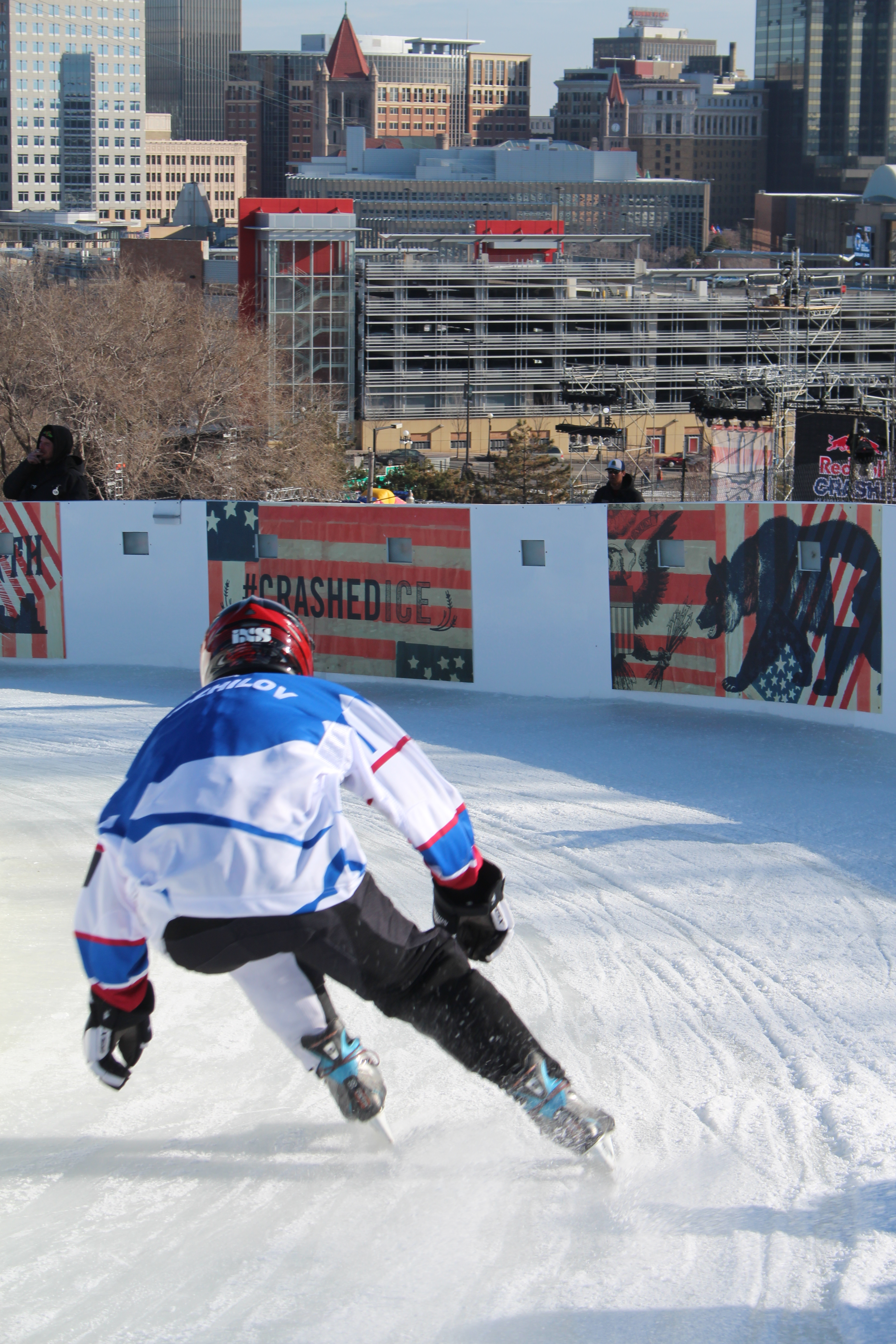
Crashed Ice skater in downtown St. Paul, Minnesota

Red Bull Crashed Ice was a world tour in ice cross downhill, a winter extreme sporting event which involves downhill skating in an urban environment, on a track which includes steep turns and high vertical drops. Racers speed down the course's turns, berms, and jumps. Competitors, having advanced from one of the tryouts in the prior months, race in heats of four skaters, with the top two advancing from each heat. The events were held from 2001 to 2019; the ATSX now oversees ice cross downhill events.

The series was created and is managed by energy drink company Red Bull. It is similar to ski cross and snowboard cross, except with ice skates on an ice track, instead of skis or snowboards on a snow track.

Racers are typically athletes with a background in ice hockey, however competitors from the sports of bandy and ringette have also competed with great success, such as Salla Kyhälä from Finland's national ringette team, who also played in Canada's National Ringette League, and Jasper Felder, a bandy player who became an ice cross downhill seven-time single event winner. As a bandy player, Felder represented the United States national bandy team, while in ice cross downhill, represented Sweden while equipped with ice hockey gear. Felder was first in the single-event in 2001, 2002, 2003, 2005, 2009, and twice in 2004.

== Single event winners ==
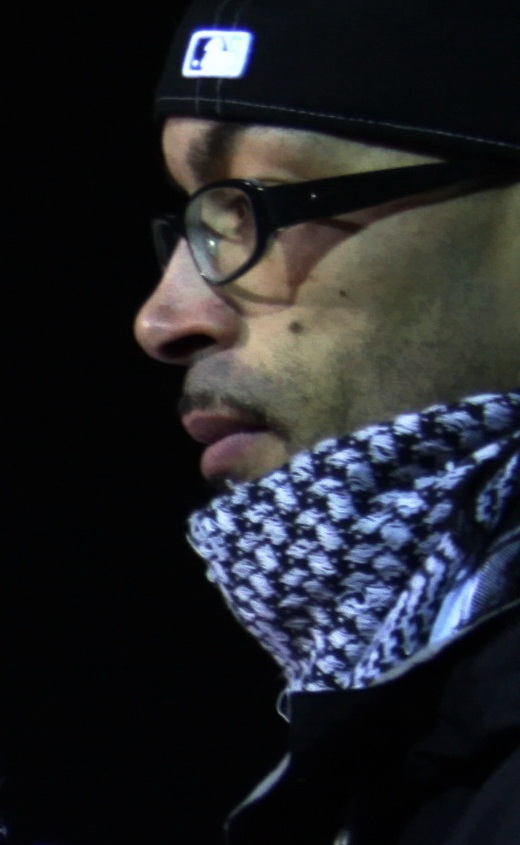
Jasper Felder won the single event seven times

Date	Location	Champion
2001	Stockholm, Sweden	Jasper Felder, Sweden
2002	Klagenfurt, Austria	Jasper Felder, Sweden
2003	Duluth, Minnesota, United States	Jasper Felder, Sweden
2004	Moscow, Russia	Jasper Felder, Sweden
2004	Duluth, Minnesota, United States	Jasper Felder, Sweden
2005	Prague, Czech Republic	Jasper Felder, Sweden
2006	Quebec City, Quebec, Canada	Gabriel Andre, Canada
2007	Quebec City, Quebec, Canada	Kevin Olson, Canada
2007	Helsinki, Finland	Kevin Olson, Canada
2008	Davos, Switzerland	Miikka Jouhkimainen, Finland
2008	Quebec City, Quebec, Canada	Arttu Pihlainen, Finland
2009	Quebec City, Quebec, Canada	Arttu Pihlainen, Finland
2009	Lausanne, Switzerland	Jasper Felder, Sweden
2009	Prague, Czech Republic	

== World championship era ==
From 2010 onwards a points system was introduced. After the season, the skater with the most points is crowned the world champion. Points are awarded to the top 100 racers. Points are awarded starting with 1000 for the winner, after that 800, 600, 500 and decreasing to 0.5 for place 100.

For the 2015 season, the Riders Cup events were instituted. The events were designed to make the sport more accessible to more skaters. For these events, skaters can earn up to 25% of the points that the main events are awarded, with percentages decreasing with each placing. Meaning that the winner receives 250 points, which is 25% of the main event 1000 points and it decreases to 1% of the main event points for the 64th finisher, who receives 2.5 points. Any placings 65th and beyond do not score any points.

As well, a new wrinkle was added to the overall championship called the "throw out" rule. If a competitor competes in all of the stops, up to a maximum of 12 events in future years, the lowest main event score and the lowest Riders Cup score will be thrown out. This will give the skater an adjusted score for the overall championship. Thus, meaning that it is in the skater's best interest to compete in all events.

=== Individual Competition ===
==== 2016 World Championship ====
Date	Location	Men's Champion	Women's Champion
November 28, 2015	Quebec City, Quebec, Canada	Cameron Naasz, United States	Myriam Trépanier, Canada
January 9, 2016	Munich, Germany	Cameron Naasz, United States	Jacqueline Legere, Canada
January 30, 2016	Jyväskylä, Finland	Scott Croxall, Canada	
February 26, 2016	St. Paul, United States	Cameron Naasz, United States	Jacqueline Legere, Canada
2016	World Champion	Cameron Naasz, United States	Jacqueline Legere, Canada

==== 2017 World Championship ====
Date	Location	Men's Champion	Women's Champion	
December 10, 2016	Wagrain, Austria	Marco Dallago, Austria		Riders Cup
January 14, 2017	Marseille, France	Cameron Naasz, United States	Jacqueline Legere, Canada	Red Bull Crashed Ice
January 20–21, 2017	Jyväskylä, Finland	Scott Croxall, Canada		Red Bull Crashed Ice
January 28, 2017	Rautalampi, Finland	Jim De Paoli, Switzerland		Riders Cup
February 4, 2017	Moscow, Russia			Riders Cup
February 3–4, 2017	St. Paul, United States	Dean Moriarity, Canada	Myriam Trépanier, Canada	Red Bull Crashed Ice
February 18, 2017	La Sarre, Canada			Riders Cup
February 25, 2017	Bathurst, New Brunswick, Canada	Cancelled	N/A	Riders Cup
March 3–4, 2017	Ottawa, Canada	Cameron Naasz, United States	Jacqueline Legere, Canada	Red Bull Crashed Ice
2017	World Champion	Cameron Naasz, United States	Jacqueline Legere, Canada	Overall

==== 2018 World Championship ====
Date	Location	Men's Champion	Women's Champion	
January 19–20, 2018	St. Paul, United States	Marco Dallago, Austria	Amanda Trunzo, United States	Red Bull Crashed Ice
February 2–3, 2018	Jyväskylä, Finland	Luca Dallago, Austria	Amanda Trunzo, United States	Red Bull Crashed Ice
February 16–17, 2018	Marseille, France	Cameron Naasz, United States	Jacqueline Legere, Canada	Red Bull Crashed Ice
March 9–10, 2018	Edmonton, Canada	Luca Dallago, Austria	Amanda Trunzo, United States	Red Bull Crashed Ice
2018	World Champion	Scott Croxall, Canada	Amanda Trunzo, United States	Overall

==== 2019 World Championship ====
Date	Location	Men's Champion	Women's Champion	
December 7–8, 2018	Yokohama, Japan	Cameron Naasz, United States	Amanda Trunzo, United States	Red Bull Crashed Ice
February 2, 2019	Jyväskylä, Finland	Kyle Croxall, Canada	Amanda Trunzo, United States	Red Bull Crashed Ice
February 8–9, 2019	Boston, MA (Fenway Park), United States	Cameron Naasz	Amanda Trunzo, United States	Red Bull Crashed Ice
2019	World Champion	Cameron Naasz	Amanda Trunzo, United States	Overall

=== Men's competition ===
==== 2010 World Championship ====
Date	Location	Champion
January 16	Munich, Germany	Martin Niefnecker, Germany
March 21	Quebec City, Quebec, Canada	Kyle Croxall, Canada
2010	World Champion	Martin Niefnecker, Germany

==== 2011 World Championship ====
Date	Location	Champion
January 15	Munich, Germany	Kyle Croxall, Canada
February 5	Valkenburg, Netherlands	Arttu Pihlainen, Finland
February 26	Moscow, Russia	Arttu Pihlainen, Finland
March 19	Quebec City, Quebec, Canada	Arttu Pihlainen, Finland
2011	World Champion	Arttu Pihlainen, Finland

==== 2012 World Championship ====
Date	Location	Champion
January 14	St. Paul, Minnesota, United States	Kyle Croxall, Canada
February 4	Valkenburg, Netherlands	Kyle Croxall, Canada
February 18	Åre, Sweden	Adam Horst, Canada
March 17	Quebec City, Quebec, Canada	Arttu Pihlainen, Finland
2012	World Champion	Kyle Croxall, Canada

==== 2013 World Championship ====
Date	Location	Champion
December 1	Niagara Falls, Ontario, Canada	Kyle Croxall, Canada
January 26	St. Paul, Minnesota, United States	Kyle Croxall, Canada
February 9	Landgraaf, Netherlands	Derek Wedge, Switzerland
March 2	Lausanne, Switzerland	Cameron Naasz, United States
March 16	Quebec City, Quebec, Canada	Arttu Pihlainen, Finland
2013	World Champion	Derek Wedge, Switzerland

==== 2014 World Championship ====
Date	Location	Champion
February 1	Helsinki, Finland	Marco Dallago, Austria
February 22	St. Paul, Minnesota, United States	Marco Dallago, Austria
March 8	Moscow, Russia	Cameron Naasz, United States
March 22	Quebec City, Quebec, Canada	Marco Dallago, Austria
2014	World Champion	Marco Dallago, Austria

==== 2015 World Championship ====
Date	Location	Champion
January 18 - Riders Cup	Afton Alps/Hastings, Minnesota, United States	Cameron Naasz, United States
January 24	St. Paul, Minnesota, United States	Kyle Croxall, Canada
January 31 - Riders Cup	Wagrain-Kleinarl, Austria	Marco Dallago, Austria
February 7	Helsinki, Finland	Scott Croxall, Canada
February 14 - Riders Cup	Jyväskylä, Finland	Scott Croxall, Canada
February 21	Belfast, Northern Ireland	Scott Croxall, Canada
March 7 - Riders Cup	Sherbrooke, Quebec, Canada	Dylan Moriarty, Canada
March 14	Edmonton, Alberta, Canada	Cameron Naasz, United States
2015	World Champion	Scott Croxall, Canada

=== Team competition ===
==== 2013 Team Challenge World Championship ====
Date	Location	Champion
December 1	Niagara Falls, Ontario, Canada	Swatch Proteam
January 26	St. Paul, Minnesota, United States	Living The Dream
February 9	Landgraaf, Netherlands	Cancelled
March 2	Lausanne, Switzerland	International Gladiators
March 16	Quebec City, Quebec, Canada	Swatch Proteam
2013	World Champion	Swatch Proteam

==== 2014 Team Challenge World Championship ====
Date	Location	Champion
February 1	Helsinki, Finland	Living The Dream
February 22	St. Paul, Minnesota, United States	Couch Garden Crew
March 8	Moscow, Russia	Crazy Canucks
March 22	Quebec City, Quebec, Canada	Couch Garden Crew
2014	World Champion	Couch Garden Crew

==== 2015 Team Challenge World Championship ====
Date	Location	Champion
January 24	St. Paul, Minnesota, United States	Prestige Worldwide
February 21	Belfast, Northern Ireland	Living The Dream
March 13	Edmonton, Alberta, Canada	Living The Dream
2015	World Champion	Living The Dream

=== Women's competition ===
Date	Location	Champion
2010	Quebec City, Quebec, Canada	Kerri Muri, Canada
2011	Quebec City, Quebec, Canada	Salla Kyhälä, Finland
2012	Quebec City, Quebec, Canada	Fannie Desforges, Canada
2013	Quebec City, Quebec, Canada	Dominique Thibault, Canada
2014	Quebec City, Quebec, Canada	Salla Kyhälä, Finland

==== 2015 Women's World Championship ====
Date	Location	Champion
January 18 - Riders Cup	Afton Alps/Hastings, Minnesota, United States	Tamara Kajah, Canada
January 24	St. Paul, Minnesota, United States	Salla Kyhälä, Finland
February 14 - Riders Cup	Jyväskylä, Finland	Jacqueline Legere, Canada
2015	World Champion	

== Gallery ==
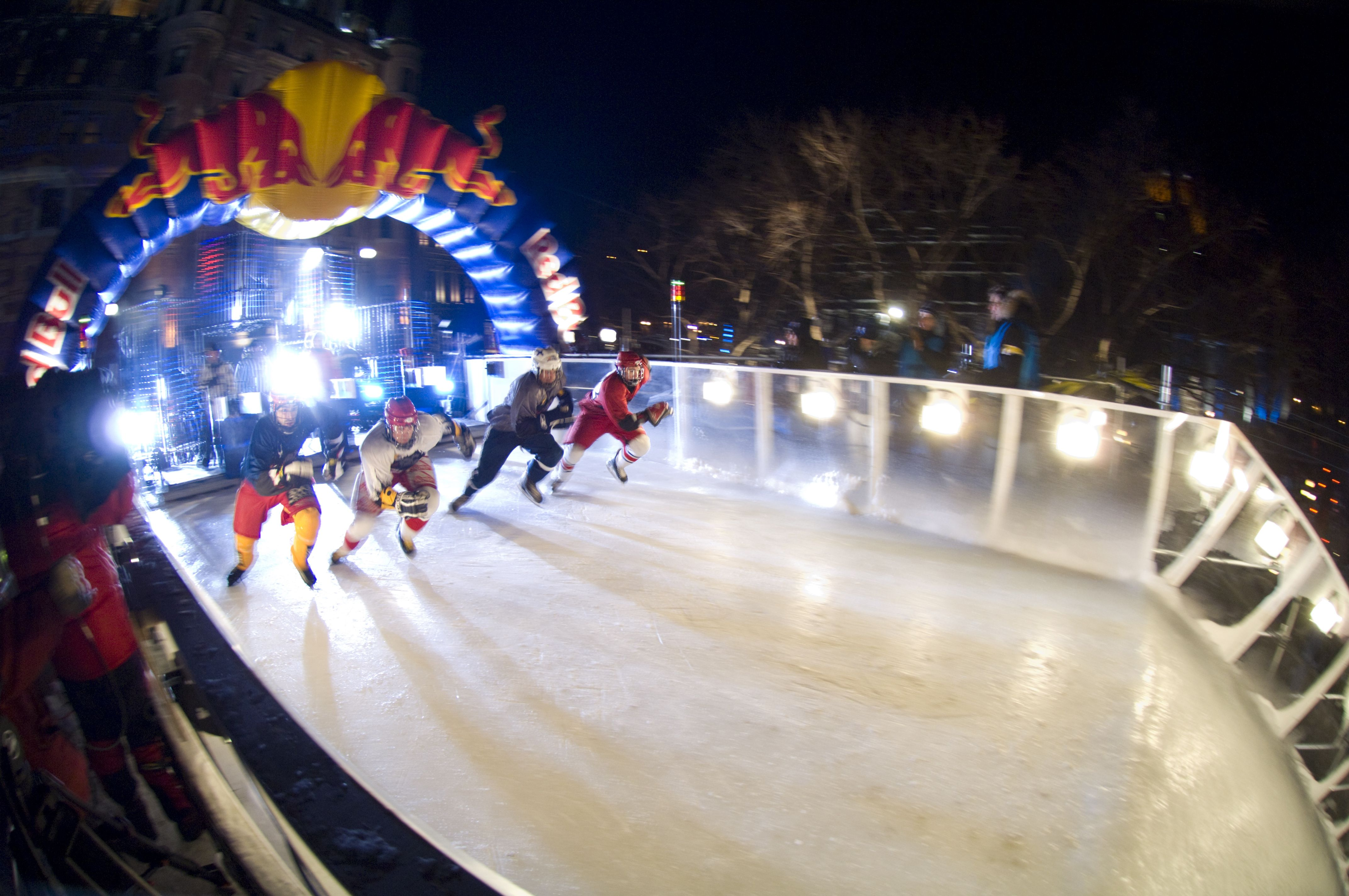
Start of a race in 2008

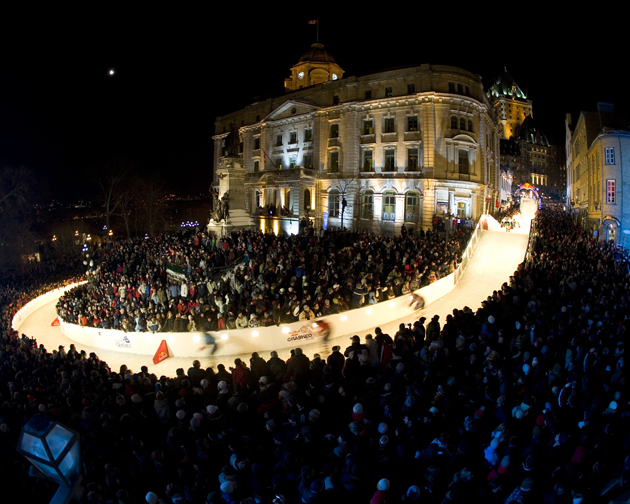
A turn in the track in Quebec, 2007

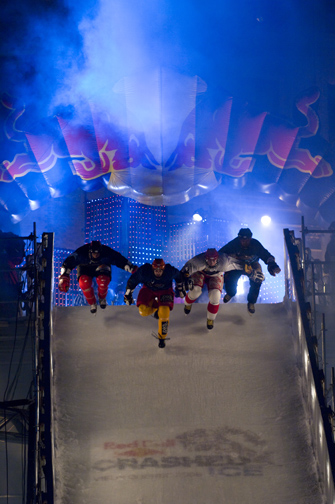
4 racers in Quebec, 2008

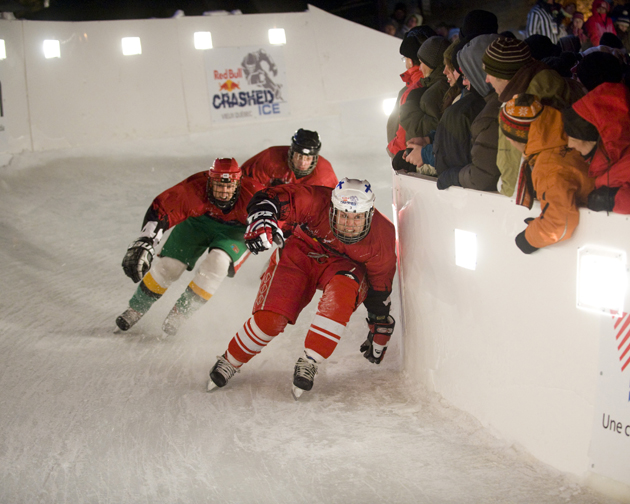
Close racing, Quebec, 2008

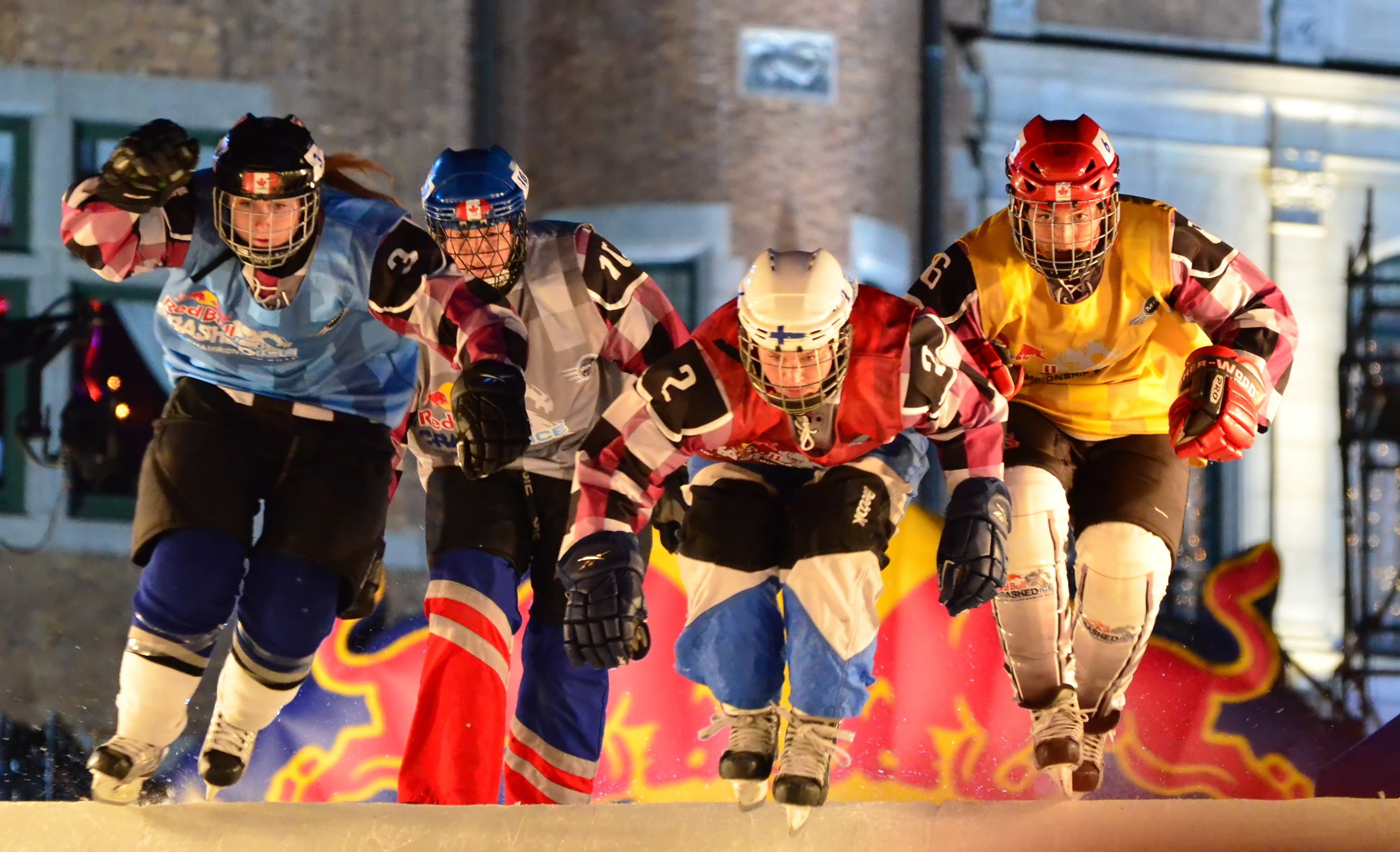
4 racers in Quebec, 2011
