= Amanda Trunzo =

American ice hockey player

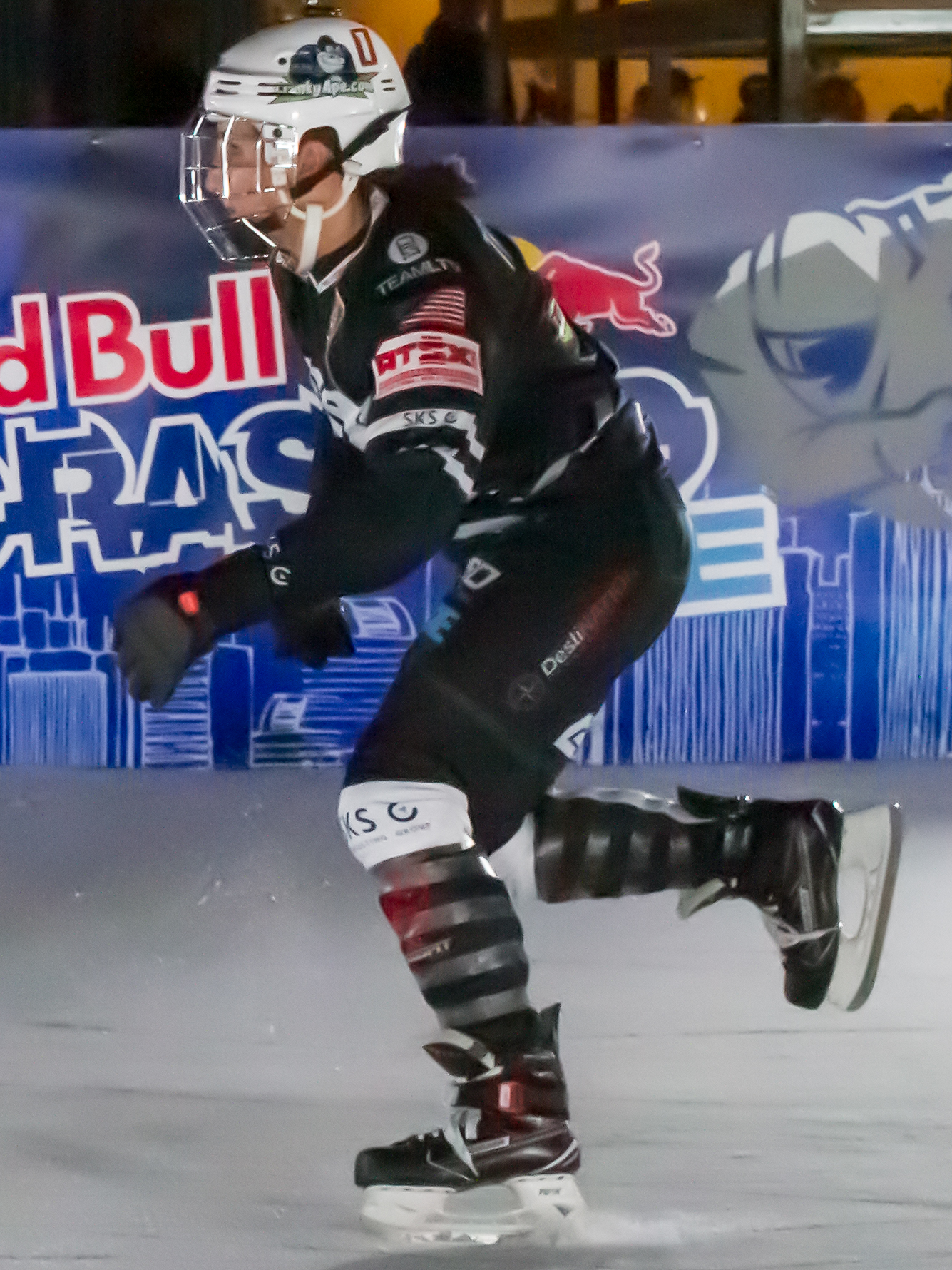
- Born: August 30, 1989 (age 37) Andover, Minnesota, USA
- Height: 5 ft 4 in (163 cm)
- Position: Forward
- Hockey East team: Dartmouth
- Playing career: 2007–2011
Medal record
Red Bull Crashed Ice Races
Silver medal – second place	2017 Marseilles, France	Individual
Gold medal – first place	2017 Jyvaskyla-Laajis, Finland	Individual

Amanda Trunzo (born August 30, 1989) is a former women's ice hockey player from Minnesota. In the NCAA, she competed for the Dartmouth Big Green and was also named to the USA U-22 National team in 2010. She competes in Red Bull Crashed Ice and was the first American to become the World Champion in 2017–18. She won the World Championship again in 2018–19.

== Athletic career ==
=== Ice hockey ===
In Minnesota, Trunzo played hockey for two different schools. She spent three years at Andover High School and was the captain in every season. Trunzo transferred to Benilde-St. Margaret's and was a two-year member of their women's hockey team. In her final season, she was selected as the team captain, while helping Benilde-St. Margaret's to a North Suburban Conference Championship, along with a Section 6AA title as the school compiled a record of 26–4–1.

==== NCAA ====
During the 2010–11 Dartmouth Big Green women's ice hockey season, she became the 32nd player in program history to score 100 points in a career.

=== Red Bull Crashed Ice ===
Trunzo first competed in Red Bull Crashed Ice at a race in 2012 in Quebec City, where she finished 4th overall. She was one of only five women (among 164 qualifiers) that participated in the Red Bull Crashed Ice World Championships (downhill ice-track racing). During the 2015-16 Crashed Ice season, Trunzo was a member of Team USA, finishing 8th overall in the world rankings.

To begin the 2016-17 Crashed Ice season, Trunzo finished in second place in the opening race, contested in Marseilles, France. The second race, in Jyvaskyla-Laajis, Finland, saw Trunzo experienced a first-place finish for the first time in her Crashed Ice career.

In 2017–18, Trunzo started off the season with a first-place finish in St Paul, MN and continued that momentum to the next race of the season where she earned another first-place finish in Jyväskylä, Finland. For the next stop in Marseille France she found herself on the podium for a second-place finish and finished out the year in Edmonton with a first-place finish. She was crowned the 2017-18 Red Bull Crashed Ice World Champion and became the first ever USA Woman to win it.

The 2018-19 Red Bull Crashed Ice season came and Trunzo once again started the season off strong winning the first race of the season in Yokohama, Japan. Her winning streak didn't stop there as she made it an undefeated season winning the next two stops in Jyväskylä Finland and Boston, Massachusetts. She was crowned the 2018-19 Red Bull Crashed Ice World Champion for the second year in a row.

== Awards and honors ==
- 2006-07 Benilde-St. Margaret's Team Most Valuable Player
- 2007 Minnesota Miss Hockey Award finalist
- ECAC Hockey Rookie of the Week (Week of Nov. 5, 2007)
- Dartmouth 2009 Offensive Player of the Year Award
- Nominee for the 2009 Patty Kazmaier Award
- 2009 Honorable mention All-Ivy
- 2009 ECAC Hockey Third Team
- Nominee for the 2010 Patty Kazmaier Award
- Amanda Trunzo, ECAC MLX Skates Player of the Week, (Week of February 22, 2011)
- 2011 Second Team All-Ivy
- 2016 Jyväskylä Finland, Red Bull Crashed Ice 1st place
- 2017-18 Jyväskylä Finland, Red Bull Crashed Ice 1st place
- 2017-18 Marseille France, Red Bull Crashed Ice 2nd place
- 2017-18 St Paul, MN Red Bull Crashed Ice 1st place
- 2017-18 Edmonton, Canada, Red Bull Crashed Ice 1st place
- 2017-18 Red Bull Crashed Ice World Champion
- 2018-19 Yokohama Japan, Red Bull Crashed Ice 1st place
- 2018-19 Jyväskylä Finland, Red Bull Crashed Ice 1st place
- 2018-19 Boston, USA Red Bull Crashed Ice Champion
- 2018-19 Red Bull Crashed Ice World Champion

== Career stats ==
Season	GP	G	A	PTS	PIM
2007-08	31	11	6	17	28
2008-09	34	22	20	42	32
2009-10	27	18	15	33	33
2010-11	32	17	18	35	10

== Personal life ==
At Dartmouth, Trunzo volunteered at Athletes United, a mentoring program to reach out to the community.
