= 2023 WRC =

2023 WRC may refer to:

- 2023 World Rally Championship
- 2023 World Ringette Championships
- 2023 World Rowing Championships
- 2023 World Rowing Cup
