= Finland national ringette team =

Girl's and women's national ringette teams representing Finland

Finland
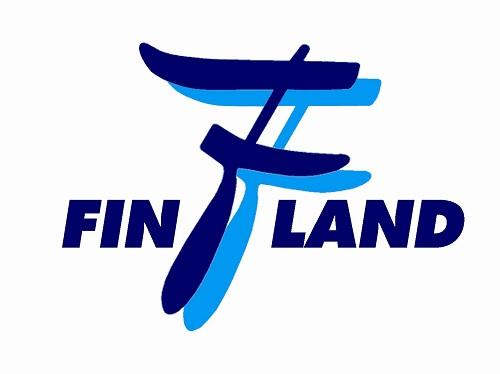
- Previous Finland National Ringette Team logo
- Nickname: Team Finland
- Association: Ringette Finland (Finnish: Suomen Ringetteliitto)
- Head coach: Team Finland Sr.; POSTPONED (2023): Team Finland Jr.; Nina Sundell (2023): Team Finland U18; Heidi Petrell (2023)
- Assistants: Team Finland Sr.; Marjukka Virta; Eevi Kaasinen; Team Finland Jr.
- Captain: Team Finland Sr.; Susanna Tapani; Team Finland Jr.; Enni Ojala
- Team colors
Home colours	Away colours

First international
- Senior: Finland (Sr.) 1990 (Gloucester, Canada; 1990) Junior: Finland (Jr.) 28–1 Sweden (Sr.) (North Bay, Canada; December 31, 2013)

World Ringette Championships
- Appearances: Junior: 6 (first in 2009) Senior: 14 including 1998 Summit Series (first in 1990)
- Best result: (gold) Senior: 1st; 1994, 1998, 2000, 2004, 2007, 2010, 2013, 2016, 2017, 2019, 2022, 2025; (gold) Junior: 1st; 2009, 2013, 2022, 2023

Medal record

World Ringette Championships

Seniors
	1990 Gloucester	Team
Bronze medal – third place	1992 Helsinki	Team
Gold medal – first place	1994 Saint Paul	Team
Silver medal – second place	1996 Stockholm	Team
Gold medal – first place	1998 Summit Series; Turku, Gothenburg, Osnabruck, Colmar	Team
Gold medal – first place	2000 Espoo and Lahti	Team
Silver medal – second place	2002 Edmonton	Team
Gold medal – first place	2004 Stockholm	Team
Gold medal – first place	2007 Ottawa	Team
Gold medal – first place	2010 Tampere	Team
Gold medal – first place	2013 North Bay	Team
Gold medal – first place	2016 Helsinki	Team
Gold medal – first place	2017 Mississauga	Team
Gold medal – first place	2019 Burnaby	Team
	2021 Helsinki	Cancelled
Gold medal – first place	2022 Espoo	Team
	2023 Calgary, POSTPONED	Team
Gold medal – first place	2025 Lahti	Team

World Junior Ringette Championships

Juniors
Gold medal – first place	2009 Prague	Team
Bronze medal – third place	2009 Prague	Team
Silver medal – second place	2012 London	Team

World Ringette Championships

Juniors
Gold medal – first place	2013 North Bay	Team
Silver medal – second place	2016 Tampere	Team
Silver medal – second place	2017 Mississauga	Team
Silver medal – second place	2019 Burnaby	Team
	2021 Helsinki	Cancelled
Gold medal – first place	2022 Espoo	Team
Gold medal – first place	2023 Calgary	Team

World Ringette Championships

U18 International Development Festival
	2022 Espoo	Team
	2023 Calgary	Team

The Finland national ringette team, (Finnish: Suomen naisten ringettemaajoukkue), more commonly known as "Team Finland", is the ringette team representing Finland internationally. Finland has both a senior national team, Team Finland Senior, and a junior national team, Team Finland Junior. Both national teams compete in the World Ringette Championships (WRC) and are overseen by Ringette Finland, (Finnish: Suomen Ringetteliitto) which is a member of the International Ringette Federation (IRF). Finland's first appearance in international ringette took place at the first World Ringette Championships in 1990.

Team Finland and Team Canada have emerged as ringette's major international rivals at both the senior and junior level. Historically, Team Finland Senior dominates the Senior Pool, while Team Canada Junior dominates the Junior Pool.

Timo Himberg was the head coach of the senior national team from March 2011 to 2020 after which Pasi Kataja was chosen to become the team's next head coach. Kataja was previously the coach of the Finnish senior national ringette team from 2003–2006 and the head coach of the junior national team from 1999–2002.

== History ==
Finland's first appearance in international ringette took place at the 1990 World Ringette Championships which was the inaugural year for the World Ringette Championships (WRC). One Finland senior amateur ringette team represented the country, "Team Finland", while the Canadians sent six different Canadian teams to compete. Since the 1990 WRC, a single amateur national Finland team has served as the country's senior representative, with Team Finland Senior eventually competing against Team Canada Senior in the 1998 Summit Series.

The 2009 World Junior Ringette Championships was the first ringette tournament where an international competition took place specifically for junior players between ringette playing nations. Team Finland Junior (U19) is Finland's junior representative. Today junior national ringette teams compete in the Junior Pool at the World Ringette Championships after the junior tournament merged with the larger senior program in 2013.

== World Championship record ==
=== Summit Series ===
The 1998 World Ringette Championships were replaced by a Summit Series between Team Canada and Team Finland, both of which were senior teams. Team Finland finished in first place defeating Team Canada.

=== Senior Finland ===
(Seniors) World Ringette Championships
Year	Location	Result	Notes
1990	(Canada) Gloucester	7th	
1992	(Finland) Helsinki	Bronze	
1994	(United States) Saint Paul	Gold	
1996	(Sweden) Stockholm	Silver	
1998 "Summit Series"	(Finland) Turku (Sweden) Gothenburg (Germany) Osnabrück (France) Colmar	Gold	
2000	(Finland) Espoo and Lahti	Gold	
2002	(Canada) Edmonton	Silver	
2004	(Sweden) Stockholm	Gold	
2007	(Canada) Ottawa	Gold	
2010	(Finland) Tampere	Gold	
2013	(Canada) North Bay	Gold	
2016	(Finland) Helsinki	Gold	
2017	(Canada) Mississauga	Gold	
2019	(Canada) Burnaby	Gold	
2021	(Finland) Helsinki	cancelled	
2022	(Finland) Espoo	Gold	
2023	(Canada) Calgary	postponed	
2025	(Finland) Lahti	Gold	

=== Junior Finland ===
(Juniors) World Ringette Championships
Year	Location	Result	Notes
2009	(Czech Republic) Prague	Gold	
2012	(Canada) London	Silver	
2013	(United States) Saint Paul	Gold	
2016	(Sweden) Stockholm	Silver	
2017	(Canada) Mississauga	Silver	
2019	(Canada) Burnaby	Silver	
2021	(Finland) Helsinki	cancelled	
2022	(Finland) Espoo	Gold	
2023	(Canada) Calgary	Gold	
2025	(Finland) Lahti	Gold	

== Team Finland Senior ==
Team Finland Senior's first appearance in international ringette took place at the first World Ringette Championships in 1990 in Gloucester, Ontario. However, the team was initially known only as "Team Finland" until the addition of the junior level at the World Ringette Championships in 2013, after which it has been known as Team Finland Senior. Having competed at every World Championships since, they have won nine of the fourteen events, marking them as the most successful national ringette side by far.

== Team Finland Junior ==
The World Junior Ringette Championship tournament was created separately from the major competition between senior national teams (the World Ringette Championships) and was established in 2009 by the International Ringette Federation. At the 2009 World Junior Ringette Championships, Finland was represented by two U19 (Under–19) teams, the Finland White Stars and the Finland Blue Stars.

For the next World Junior Ringette Championships, the 2012 World Junior Ringette Championships, Finland sent only one Finland junior amateur ringette team, Team Finland U19. While Finland had formed its first all-junior Finland national ringette team in 2012, its arch-rival, Canada, did not form its first all-junior Canadian national ringette team until 2013. However, by 2013, the Junior tournament was officially merged with the World Ringette Championship and ceased as a separate event. From WRC 2013 onward, all competing ringette nations with Junior national ringette teams compete in the World Ringette Championships program along with Senior national teams but did so in a separate Junior Pool, currently dominated by Team Canada. Team Finland Junior and Team Canada Junior compete in a best-of-three series with the winner of the world ringette junior title also hoisting the Juuso Wahlsten Trophy.

== Notable people ==
=== Players ===
- Salla Kyhälä
- Marjukka Virta
- Anne Pohjola
- Susanna Tapani⁣⁣
- Kristiina Heinonen
- Katja Kortesoja
- Petra Ojaranta
- Anna Vanhatalo
- Riikka Häyrinen
- Kirsi Pukkila
- Emma-Julia Wood
- Petra Vaarakallio – Vaarakallio won the 1992 World Ringette Championships bronze. She stopped playing ringette after receiving a six-month suspension for kicking an opponent who was lying on the ice.
- Anna-Kaisa Raesola
- Elina Raesola
- Kristiina Siitonen

=== Juuso Wahlsten ===
Juhani Jorma Kalevi Wahlsten, a.k.a. Juuso Wahlsten, is called "The Father of Finnish Ringette" and was responsible for introducing ringette to Finland in 1979. The World Ringette Championships junior trophy has been named in his honour, the Juuso Wahlsten Trophy. Wahlsten also competed in the Winter Olympics as a member of the Finland men's national ice hockey team and was inducted into the IIHF Hall of Fame.

== Gallery ==
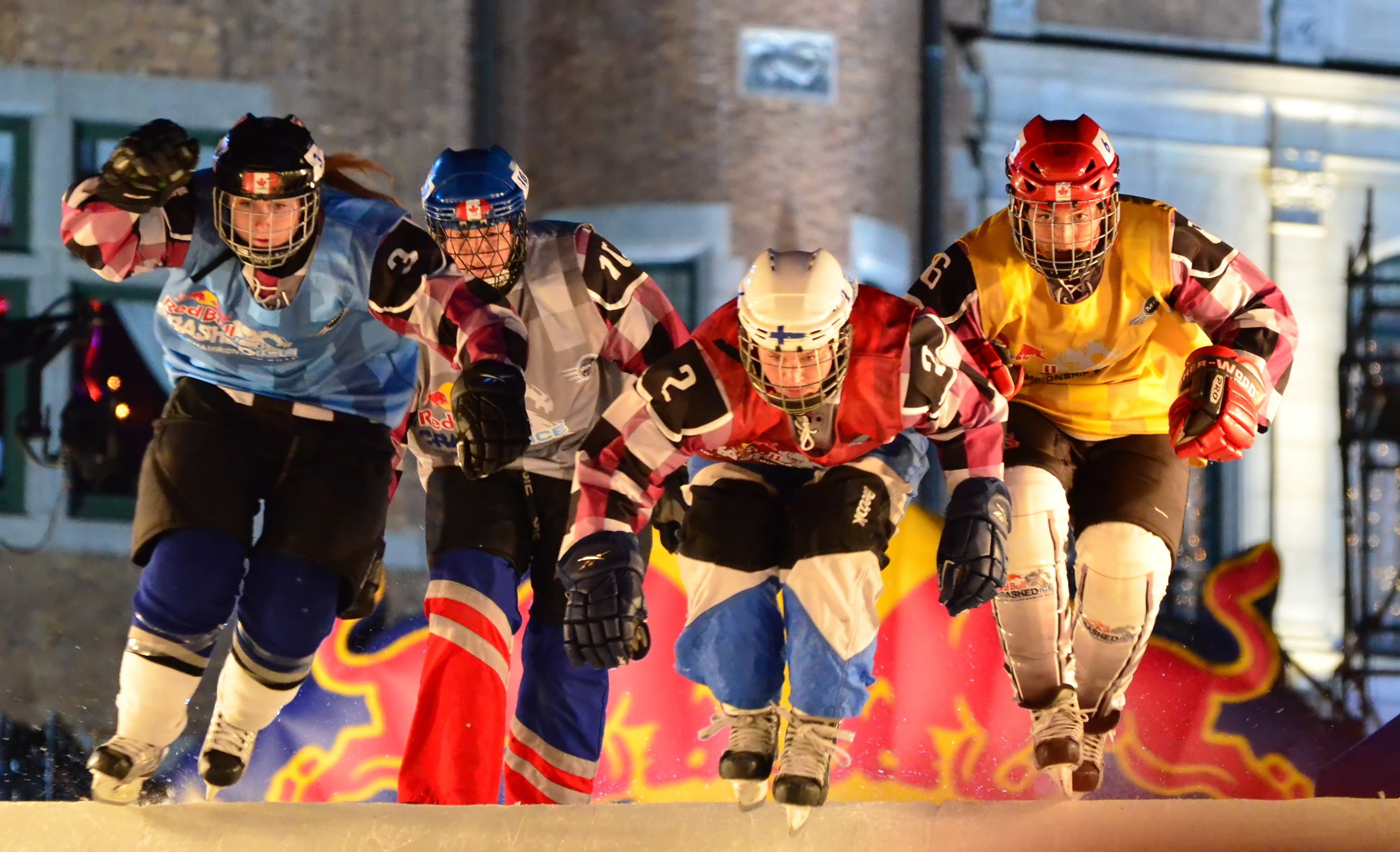
Salla Kyhälä
second from right

== See also ==
- Ringette
- World Ringette Championships
  - Canada national ringette team
  - United States national ringette team
  - Sweden national ringette team
  - Czech Republic national ringette team
- International Ringette Federation
- Sam Jacks
- Juhani "Juuso" Wahlsten
