= Timo Himberg =

Finnish ringette coach

Timo Himberg is a Finnish ringette coach. He was the head coach of the Finland national ringette team in the years 2011–2020 and won the World Ringette Championships in 2013, 2016, 2017 and 2019.

== Career ==
From 1993 to 2000, Himberg served as the second coach of the Finnish national ringette team and from 2007 to 2010 as the head coach of the Finnish youth ringette national team, Team Finland Junior. At that time the team won the under-19 World Junior Ringette Championship in 2009.

In the SM Ringette league, (formerly Ringeten SM-sarja), Himberg has coached Raision Nuorisokiekko (RNK), VG:62 and Turun Ringette.
