= 2025 WRC =

2025 WRC may refer to:

- 2025 World Rally Championship
- 2025 World Ringette Championships
- 2025 World Rowing Championships
- 2025 World Rowing Cup
