= 2022 WRC =

2022 WRC may refer to:

- 2022 World Rally Championship
- 2022 World Ringette Championships
- 2022 World Rowing Championships
- 2022 World Rowing Cup
