= United States national ringette team =

Girl's and women's national ringette teams representing the United States

United States
- Nickname: Team USA
- Association: USA Ringette
- Head coach: Kari Sadoway
- Assistants: Phyllis Sadoway; Beth Vallis; Jason Sjostram; Devon Lowe
- Captain: Hilary Davidson
- Team colors
Home colours	Away colours

First international
- Senior: (United States) 1990 (Gloucester, Canada; 1990); Junior: (United States) 2012 (London, Canada; 2012)

World Ringette Championships
- Appearances: Senior Pool: 13 excluding 1998 Summit Series (first in 1990)
- Best result: Senior Pool: (bronze) Senior: 3rd; 1996, 2000, 2002, 2004, 2010; President's Pool: (gold) Senior: 1st; 2022

Medal record

World Ringette Championships

Seniors
	Senior; 1990 Gloucester	Team
	Senior; 1992 Helsinki	Team
	Senior; 1994 Saint Paul	Team
Bronze medal – third place	Senior; 1996 Stockholm	Team
	1998 Summit Series; Turku, Gothenburg, Osnabruck, Colmar	No team
Bronze medal – third place	Senior; 2000 Espoo and Lahti	Team
Bronze medal – third place	Senior; 2002 Edmonton	Team
Bronze medal – third place	Senior; 2004 Stockholm	Team
	Senior; 2007 Ottawa	Team
Bronze medal – third place	Senior; 2010 Tampere	Team
Bronze medal – third place	President's Pool; 2013 North Bay	Team
	Senior Pool; 2016 Helsinki	Team
	Junior Pool; 2016 Helsinki	Team
Silver medal – second place	President's Pool; 2017 Helsinki	Team
Silver medal – second place	President's Pool; 2019 Burnaby	Team
	2021 Helsinki	Cancelled
Gold medal – first place	President's Pool; 2022 Espoo	Team
	President's Pool; 2023 Calgary	Team

World Junior Ringette Championships

Juniors
	2009 Prague	No team
	2012 London	Team

World Ringette Championships

Juniors
	2013 North Bay	No team
	2016 Tampere	No team
	2017 Mississauga	No team
	2019 Burnaby	No team
	2021 Helsinki	Cancelled
	2022 Espoo	No team
- 2023 Calgary

The United States national ringette team (more commonly known as "Team USA"), is the ringette team representing the United States internationally. America has only one national ringette team, Team USA Senior. It does not have an official national ringette team for the junior division. Team USA Senior is overseen by USA Ringette, a member of the International Ringette Federation, and competes at the World Ringette Championships. The first appearance in international ringette by the United States took place at the first World Ringette Championships in 1990. Team Sweden is Team USA's arch-rival with both teams competing in the President's Pool against Team Czech. Team USA and related activity occurs predominantly within the American state of Michigan.

The majority of Team USA's roster and its coaches consist of individuals who were born in Canada; native-born American ringette players remain rare, with Finnish-born ringette players occasionally rounding out the roster. By 2022 the team had increased the number of American players on the national team. "Team USA is often composed of mostly Canadian athletes that have a US tie, such as citizenship. However, ultimately, we want to have players residing in the US make up the entire team, and we’ve made great progress towards this in the last few years, with almost half of the roster residing in the US recently. We cover quite a few different states now but there is still a lot of work to be done."

== History ==
From 1990–2010 the World Ringette Championships had only one division in which all national teams could compete; the international ringette competition consisted entirely of adults and young adults. The Americans competed against Canadian and Finnish players during that period, and also in a separate division known as the "President's Pool" beginning in 2013. There was an exception in 2016 wherein the senior team competed in both the senior and the junior pools.

While a junior division was added to the WRC program in 2013 (U19), Team USA does not have a junior national team and therefore does not compete.

== World championship record ==
=== Senior USA ===
(Seniors) World Ringette Championships
Year	Location	Result	Notes
1990	(Canada) Gloucester	Senior; 8th	
1992	(Finland) Helsinki	Senior; 4th	
1994	(United States) Saint Paul	Senior; 4th	
1996	(Sweden) Stockholm	Senior; Bronze	
1998 "Summit Series"	Void		
2000	(Finland) Espoo and Lahti	Senior; Bronze	
2002	(Canada) Edmonton	Senior; Bronze	
2004	(Sweden) Stockholm	Senior; Bronze	
2007	(Canada) Ottawa	Senior; 4th	
2010	(Finland) Tampere	Senior; Bronze	
2013	(Canada) North Bay	President's; Bronze	
2016	(Finland) Helsinki	Senior Pool; 4th Junior Pool; 4th	
2017	(Canada) Mississauga	President's; Silver	
2019	(Canada) Burnaby	President's; Silver	
2021	(Finland) Helsinki	cancelled	
2022	(Finland) Espoo	President's; Gold	

== Team USA Senior ==
The USA Senior team has competed in every World Championships since 1990, with a highest position of third in the Senior Pool. However, they took first place in the President's Pool in 2022, after previously collecting two silver medals.

== Team USA Junior ==
The United States does not have an official national junior ringette team, but a 2012 team was formed for the 2012 World Junior Ringette Championships.

== Notable players ==
- Jody Nouwen - former American player who played defence. Nouwen started playing ringette in Minnesota when she was at 11 and played as an amateur in several American clubs. She played in Canada's National Ringette League, Finland's Ringeten SM-sarja and was a member of the USA national ringette team for the 2000, and 2010 World Ringette Championships, winning the world bronze medal both times. She retired from competition shortly after the 2010 international tournament.

== See also ==
- Sam Jacks
- Juhani "Juuso" Wahlsten
