= Keely Brown (goaltender) =

Ringette coach and former Canadian ringette, inline hockey, and ice hockey goalie

Personal information
- Born: 1976 (age 49–50) Kitchener, Ontario, Canada

Sport
- Sport: - ringette; - women's ice hockey; - women's roller in-line hockey
- Shoots: Left
Medal record
Event	1st	2nd	3rd
World Ringette Championships	1	8	0
Canadian Ringette Championships	9	8	0
World Junior Ringette Championships	0	0	1
FIRS Inline Hockey World Championships	5	0	0
Total	15	16	1
Ringette
World Ringette Championships
Representing Canada
Gold medal – first place	2002 Edmonton, Canada	Team
Silver medal – second place	2004 Huddinge, Sweden	Team
Silver medal – second place	2007 Ottawa, Canada	Team
Silver medal – second place	2010 Tampere, Finland	Team
Silver medal – second place	2013 North Bay, Canada	Team (Sr. goalie coach)
Silver medal – second place	2016 Helsinki, Finland	Team (Sr. goalie consultant)
Silver medal – second place	2017 Mississauga, Canada	Team (Sr. goalie development consultant)
Silver medal – second place	2019 Burnaby, Canada	Team (Sr. assistant coach)
Silver medal – second place	2022 Espoo, Finland	Team (Jr. assistant coach)
World Junior Ringette Championships
Representing Canada
Bronze medal – third place	2012 London, Canada	Team (Goalie coach)
Canadian Ringette Championships
Gold medal – first place	9 times	
Silver medal – second place	8 times	
Roller in-line hockey
FIRS Inline Hockey World Championships
Representing Canada
Gold medal – first place	2002 Rochester, New York, USA	Team
Gold medal – first place	2004 London, Canada	Team
Gold medal – first place	2005 Paris, France	Team
Gold medal – first place	2012 Bucaramanga, Columbia	Team (Assistant coach)
Gold medal – first place	2016 Asiago and Roana (Veneto region), Italy	Team (Assistant coach)

Keely Brown is a former Canadian national level athlete who played ringette, roller in-line hockey, and ice hockey as a goaltender. She played for the Canadian Senior National Ringette Team and was also a goalie on the Canadian Women's National Inline Hockey team. Brown also played semi-professional ringette in Canada's National Ringette League and in semi-pro women's ice hockey. Brown currently works for the National Hockey League's, Edmonton Oilers as a Senior Legal Counsel, and works for the Oilers Entertainment Group (OEG).

In ringette as an athlete, Brown has won the World Ringette Championships gold medal once, and the silver medal three times. She has won five more silver medals in coaching and consulting positions for the national Canadian ringette teams in both junior and senior levels. As of 2023, Brown is one of the assistant coaches for the Canada national ringette team and will help coach Team Canada Junior (U21). The 2023 Junior Canada team is competing in the upcoming 2023 World Ringette Championships.

Brown was inducted into the Ringette Canada Hall of Fame in 2014. As a ringette player, Brown won the gold at the World Ringette Championships in 2002 playing goalie for Team Canada and the silver medal three times. As a Team Canada coach she won one senior silver medal in 2013. She also helped create the National Ringette League and played for the Edmonton WAM!. In women's ice hockey, Brown played varsity level in Canada, played in Canada's Western Women's Hockey League, and in the National Women's Hockey League (NWHL, 1999–2007). In the late 1990s, Brown had also helped merge women's hockey leagues from Ontario and Quebec to form Canada's now defunct NWHL.

Apart from her athletic achievements, Brown also contributed significantly to the development of ringette equipment. Brown is recognized for her role in helping to develop the Keely glove, which was designed to provide better protection and grip for ringette goalies.

== Early life ==
Keely Brown was born and raised in Canada and displayed a keen interest in sports at an early age, taking up ringette, a sport that was gaining popularity in the country. She eventually honed her skills as an ice hockey goaltender and then broadened her experience by participating in in-line hockey.

== Education ==
Brown completed a four-year undergraduate degree in psychology and criminology with a women's studies minor at the University of Toronto, after which she went on to Osgoode Hall Law School and was admitted to the Ontario Bar in 2003.

== Ringette ==
=== Early career ===
Before moving to Alberta, Keely grew up playing ringette in the province of Ontario in Kitchener, Waterloo, and Sudbury. Keely competed in 19 Canadian Ringette Championships, winning nine gold and eight silver medals.

=== Team Canada ringette ===
==== Goalie ====
Brown spent years competing as a national ringette goalie for the Canadian senior national ringette team from 2000 - 2010. She competed in five World Ringette Championships, winning one gold and four silver medals.

==== Coach ====
Brown is currently an assistant coach for 2023 Team Canada Junior for the 2023 World Ringette Championships in Calgary, Canada.

At the international senior level, Keely worked as the World Ringette Championships senior goalie coach for 2013 Team Canada Senior at the 2013 World Ringette Championships and an assistant coach for 2019 Team Canada Senior at the 2019 World Ringette Championships winning silver both times. She also worked as the Canadian national ringette team's goalie consultant for 2016 Team Canada Senior and 2017 Team Canada Senior who won silver both times.

At the international junior level, she was the goalie coach for Team Canada U19 West at the 2012 World Junior Ringette Championships who won bronze medal. She was one of the assistant coaches at the 2022 World Ringette Championships for 2022 Team Canada Junior where the team won the silver medal.

=== National Ringette League ===
After moving to Alberta, she joined the Edmonton WAM! of the National Ringette League for ten years, a league which she helped create.

=== Keely glove ===
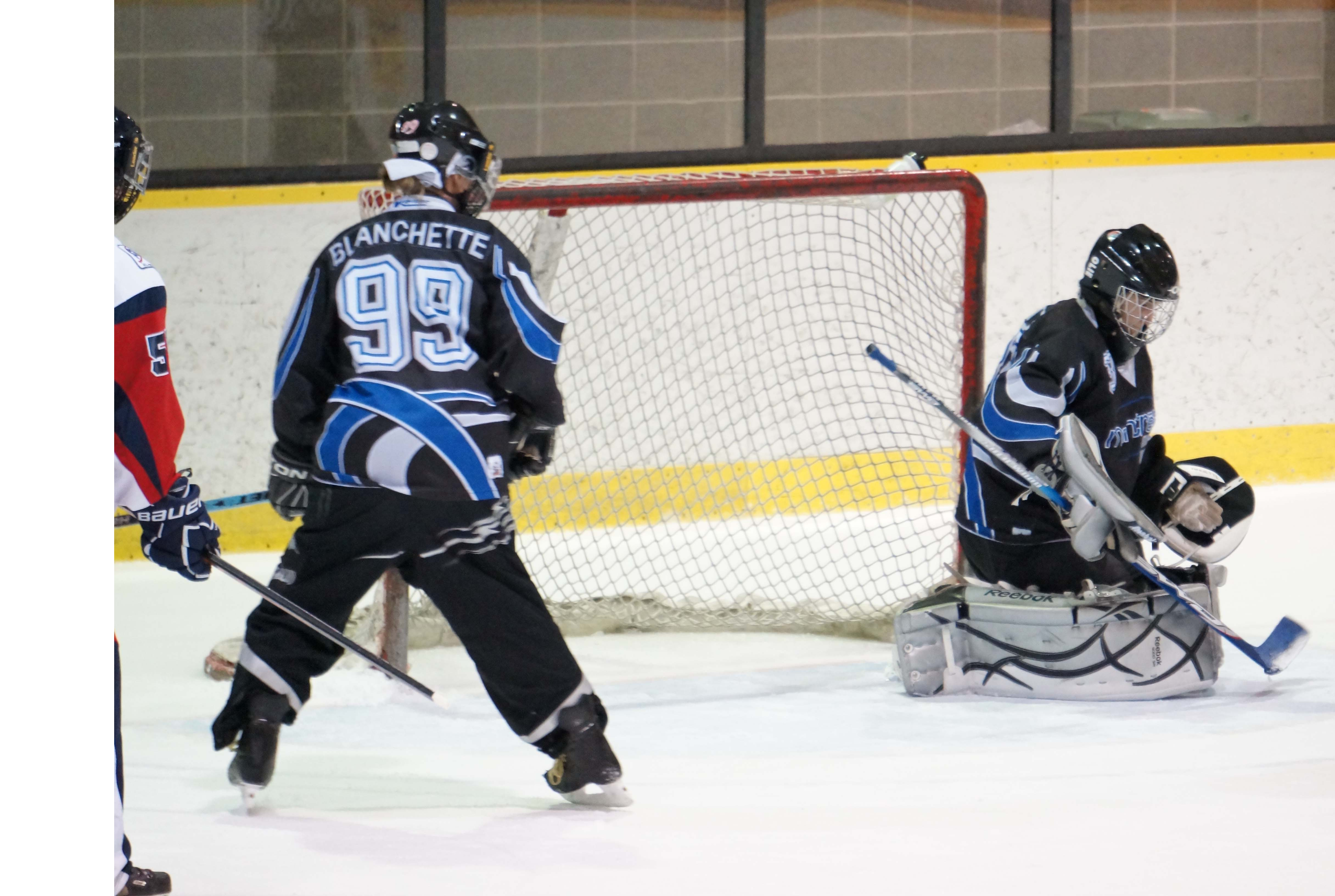
A "Keely glove" used by a ringette goalie for the Montreal Mission in the National Ringette League

Apart from her achievements on the ice, Brown also worked to improve ringette goaltending equipment. She found that available equipment did not provide adequate protection or grip for ringette goaltenders. Brown collaborated with a company called McKenney to develop a new ringette goalie trapper, known colloquially as "the Keely glove", that addressed these issues. The Keely glove was a significant advancement in ringette goaltending equipment, is still used by many athletes today, and has been developed for both senior and junior goalies. In 2021, a custom Keely glove was created for Callie Bizuk, a one-armed ringette goalie from Alberta.

=== Ringette goalie school ===
Keely Brown, along with Heather Konkin, established their own company called 5-Count Ringette Goalie Instruction. The company had a team of 25 skilled instructors who provided top-tier goalie training for ringette players all over Canada. The company's range of services encompassed goalie camps, clinics, and ice times, which were held from British Columbia to Prince Edward Island. Their main aim was to offer exceptional training to ringette goalies of all ages and abilities. Additionally, Brown authored a book titled "The Complete Guide to Ringette Goaltending."

Previously, a "5-Count Ringette Goalie Award" awarded up to two $250 each year to enrolled athletes who were actively playing as goalkeepers. The money was to be utilised for a one-of-a-kind opportunity that would help them as a goaltender, their team, and/or in ringette in general. The rewards were made possible by the generosity of Keely Brown, Heather Konkin, and the programme they co-founded, 5-Count Ringette Goalie Instruction.

=== Ringette Canada Hall of Fame ===
In 2014, Brown was inducted into the Ringette Canada Hall of Fame.

=== Alberta Sports Hall of Fame and Museum ===
In 2018, Brown was inducted into the Alberta Sports Hall of Fame and Museum.

== Inline Hockey ==
Brown's skills as a goalie were recognized early on. Brown started playing inline hockey (a.k.a. roller hockey) during her first year of university and eventually joined the Canadian Women's National Inline Hockey team. She helped the team win a gold medal at the 2002 FIRS Inline Hockey World Championships held in Rochester, New York. During her inline career, she helped Canada win 4 gold medals: in 2002, 2004, and 2005 as Team Canada goaltender, and finally two golds as one of the team's assistant coaches in 2012 and 2016.

== Ice hockey ==
=== High school ===
Brown made history as the first female to play high school boys hockey in Central Western Ontario where she played as a goaltender.

=== Canadian varsity ===
To further her career, Brown decided to join the University of Toronto's varsity hockey program, playing in the 1999-2000 season for the Toronto Varsity Blues women's ice hockey team.

=== Semi-professional ===
After playing for the Scarborough Sting and Mississauga Ice Bears in the National Women's Hockey League (NWHL) for a few years, she transitioned to play for the Edmonton Chimos in the Western Women's Hockey League. Moreover, Brown played an instrumental role in merging women's hockey leagues from Ontario and Quebec to form the National Women's Hockey League (1999–2007) in the late 1990s.

== Personal life and legacy ==
Brown is recognized as one of the greatest goaltenders in both ringette and women's inline hockey. She was inducted into the Ringette Canada Hall of Fame in 2014 in the Athlete category. She was inducted into the Alberta Sports Hall of Fame in 2018. Brown continues to promote and develop ringette and other sports.

== Individual honours ==
- Inducted into the Ringette Canada Hall of Fame in 2014 in the Athlete category.
- Inducted into the Alberta Sports Hall of Fame and Museum in 2018, as a Ringette Athlete.

== See also ==
- Canada national ringette team
- Canada women's national inline hockey team
- Julie Blanchette
- Lyndsay Wheelans
- Stéphanie Séguin
- Shelly Hruska
- Erin Cumpstone
- Jennifer Hartley

== Sources ==
1. "Keely Brown". Ringette Canada Hall of Fame. Retrieved November 9, 2021.
2. "World Champion" (PDF). Ringette Canada. Retrieved November 9, 2021.
3. "Keely Brown" (PDF). Ringette Alberta. Retrieved November 9, 2021.
4. "Keely Brown, First-Time Coach & Mentor". Hockey Canada. Retrieved November 9, 2021.
5. "Oilers Prospects: Keely Brown". Edmonton Journal. Retrieved November 9, 2021.
