= 2017 World Ringette Championships =

2017 edition of the World Ringette Championships

12th World Ringette Championships

Tournament details
- Host country: Canada
- City: Mississauga
- Venue: Hershey Centre Arena
- Dates: 27 November – 3 December 2017
- Teams: 8

Final positions
- Champions: Senior Pool; Sam Jacks Series: Finland (Sr.) (7th title) Junior Pool; Canada (Jr.) (2nd title) President's Pool Sweden (Sr.)
- Runners-up: Senior Pool; Sam Jacks Series: Canada (Sr.) Junior Pool; Finland (Jr.) President's Pool United States (Sr.)
- Third place: President's Pool; Czech Republic (Sr.)

The 2017 World Ringette Championships (2017 WRC) was an international ringette tournament and the 12th (XII) of the World Ringette Championships. The tournament was organized by the International Ringette Federation (IRF) and was contested in Mississauga, Ontario, Canada, from November 27 – December 3, 2017, at the Hershey Centre Arena, now renamed the Paramount Fine Foods Centre. Eight of the games were live-streamed online and made available for public viewing.

== Overview ==
Participating national teams in the included: Team Canada Senior, Team Canada Junior (U19), Team Finland Senior, Team Finland Junior (U19), Team Sweden Senior, Team USA Senior, Team Czech Republic Senior, and Team Slovakia Senior.

Team Finland Senior won the gold medal in the Senior Pool, a.k.a. the "Sam Jacks Series", and Team Canada Junior won the gold medal in the Junior Pool. In the President's Pool, Sweden claimed gold, the USA claimed silver, and the Czech Republic claimed the bronze.

== Venue ==
Paramount Fine Foods Centre Previously called: Hershey Centre Arena
Host venue
Location	Canada – Mississauga
Constructed	1998
Capacity	Ice Hockey: 5,612 (5,420 seated)⁣

== Teams ==
Senior Pool	Junior Pool	President's Pool
2017 Team Finland Senior	2017 Team Finland Junior (U19)	2017 Team Sweden Senior
2017 Team Canada Senior	2017 Team Canada Junior (U19)	(United States) 2017 Team USA Senior
		2017 Team Czech Republic Senior

== Final standings ==
=== Senior Pool results ===
The Senior Pool competition, also known as the "Sam Jacks Series", was a three-game series between Team Canada Senior and Team Finland Senior. Team Finland Senior won the gold medal and the Sam Jacks Trophy.

	Team
1st place, gold medalist(s)	Team Finland Senior
2nd place, silver medalist(s)	Team Canada Senior

=== Junior Pool results ===
The Junior Pool competition was a three-game series between Team Canada Junior and Team Finland Junior.

	Team
1st place, gold medalist(s)	Team Canada Junior (U19)
2nd place, silver medalist(s)	Team Finland Junior (U19)

=== President's Pool results ===
The President's Pool involved junior (U19) athletes from Team Canada Junior and Team Finland Junior competing with the developing ringette countries. The winning team was rewarded with a gold medal and the President's Trophy.

	Team
1st place, gold medalist(s)	Team Sweden Senior
2nd place, silver medalist(s)	(United States) Team USA Senior
3rd place, bronze medalist(s)	Team Czech Republic Senior

== Rosters ==
=== Seniors ===
==== Team Finland Senior ====
The 2017 Team Finland Senior team included the following:

FINLAND SENIOR
Number	Name
Forwards
9	Elina Tahvanainen
13	Katariina Kurikko
14	Tiia Halme
15	Emmi Merelä
16	Annamari Ruusu
17	Roosa Salonen
20	Maija Väyrynen
Centres
4	Marjukka Virta
5	Tanja Eloranta
10	Anne Pohjola
11	Susanna Tapani
18	Miranda Uusi-Kämppä
Defence
2	Hanna Ropanen
3	Pauliina Auvinen
19	Fiia Rebecca Impilä
21	Mira Sydänmaa
Goaltenders
30	Maria Perkkola
31	Kaisa Katajisto
32	Meini Kärnä

Team Staff
Position	Name
Team manager	Susanna Saarela
Head coach	Timo Himberg⁣⁣
Assistant coach	Kim Forsblom
Trainer	Marja Kaponen
Trainer	Mika Salminen
Trainer	Pekka Takala

==== Team Canada Senior ====
The 2017 Team Canada Senior team competed in the 2017 World Ringette Championships. The 2017 Team Canada Senior team included the following:

CANADA SENIOR
Number	Name
Forwards
2	Lindsay Vink
3	Melissa Breslin
4	Taylor Campbell
6	Kaitlyn Youldon
9	Shaundra Bruvall
10	Erika Kiviaho
11	Allison Biewald
19	Paige Nosal
23	Kelsey Youldon
66	Sheri Adams
77	Martine Caissie
89	Dailyn Bell
93	Jamie Bell
Centres
18	Jacqueline Gaudet
Defence
12	Sydney Granger
16	Chantal Gauthier
28	Christianne Varty (Captain)
21	Erica Voss
Goaltenders
33	Amy Clarkson
41	Jasmine Leblanc
61	Breanna Beck

Team Staff
Position	Name
Head coach	Barb Bautista
Assistant coach	Sharolyn Wouters
Head Athletic Therapist	Connie Klassen
Player Development Consultant	Alexis Snowdon
Player Development Consultant	Carly Ross
Goalie Development Consultant	Keely Brown
Mental Performance Consultant	Carl Nienhuis
National Team Program Logistics and Team Services Manager	Stephanie Laurin
Strength and conditioning Consultant	Nick Westcott
Team Leader	Tracey Tulloch
Officials
On-ice official	Brent Bunting
On-ice official	Chris Faulds
On-ice official	Rob Drury
Shot-clock operator	Sharon Smit
Shot-clock operator	Nancy Desfonds
Shot-clock operator	Jamie Doerbecker

=== Juniors ===
==== Team Finland Junior ====
The 2017 Team Finland Junior team included the following:

FINLAND JUNIOR (U19)
Number	Name
Players
2	Taru Kylä-Kaila
4	Katariina Niemi
5	Saga Loukiainen
6	Roosa Rantannitty
7	Emilia Raunio
9	Lotta Ylitalo
10	Nora Niemikko
11	Ella Hellsten
12	Janita Järvinen
13	Henni Isaksson
14	Henna Mantere
15	Jenni Linnamäki
16	Olga Elo
17	Laura Kyllönen
18	Jasmin Kiiski
19	Veera Nikkola
Goaltenders
30	Jasmin Haavisto
31	Hanna Minkkinen
32	Oona Keskinen

Team Staff
Position	Name
Manager	Marianna Hietamaki
Head coach	Vesa Lönngren
Assistant coach	Ate Kärnä
Assistant coach	Kirsi Pukkila
Trainer	Jari Koski
Trainer	Tony Samuelsson

==== Team Canada Junior ====
The 2017 Team Canada Junior team included the following:

CANADA JUNIOR (U19)
Number	Name
Forwards
7	Jenny Snowdon
9	Erin Markle
17	Madison Bonsel
18	Alana Lesperance
27	Sara Plouffe
51	Mégane Fortin
71	Victoria (Torrie) Shennan
74	Emily Chénier
77	Britney Snowdon
Centres
2	Gillian Dreger
3	Ashley Heimbecker
4	Kaylee Spearing
8	Marie-Pier Blanchard
10	Rachel Ung
11	Jennica Murray
22	Sara Reynolds
91	Sydney Nosal
Defence
14	Tara Burke
28	Julie Vandal
Goaltenders
1	Madison Ford
31	Laurie St-Pierre
33	Grace MacKenzie

Team Staff
Position	Name
Head coach	Lorrie Horne
Assistant coach	Chris Belan
Assistant coach	Jacinda Rolph
Assistant coach	Andrea Ferguson
Assistant coach	Danielle Hildebrand
Assistant coach	Sarah (Miller) Ianni
Goalie Consultant	Claudia Jetté
Athletic therapist	Melinda Krulicki
Strength and conditioning Consultant	Nick Westcott
National Team Program Logistics and Team Services Manager	Stephanie Laurin
Officials
On-ice official	Brent Bunting
On-ice official	Chris Faulds
On-ice official	Rob Drury
Shot-clock operator	Sharon Smit
Shot-clock operator	Nancy Desfonds
Shot-clock operator	Jamie Doerbecker

=== President's Pool ===
==== Team Sweden Senior ====
The 2017 Sweden Senior team included the following:

SWEDEN SENIOR
Number	Name
Forwards
3	Sarah Esmail Canada
4	Kajsa Frankenberg
6	Anna Norrbom
7	Tindra Sperling
8	Emilia Riikola
9	Jessica Alakärppä Finland
11	Wilma Frankenberg
16	Ellen Granath
18	Jennifer Peterback
21	Alma Lindqvist
24	Jessika Runolf
Centres
13	My Nilsson
19	Camilla LepistÃ
Defence
22	Rebecca Gustafson
Goaltenders
34	Rachelle Graham

Team Staff
Position	Name
Manager	Eva Frankenberg
Manager	Charoline Gustafson
Head coach	Eevi Kaasinen
Assistant coach	Rebecca Gustafson

==== Team USA Senior ====
The 2017 USA Senior team included the following:

USA SENIOR
Number	Name
Players
4	Chelsea Moore
Forwards
3	Moira Davidson
6	Margie Carter
7	Meghan Kelly
8	Hilary Davidson
9	Brianna Stanford
11	Lyne Davis
13	Brenda Rossetto
17	Tiffany Muylle
18	Kasey Wheal
22	S. Reiners
24	Carlye Thompson
25	Renee Hoppe
30	Samantha Gorgi
44	Claire Wyville
66	Angela Mead
88	Britt Kleine
Defence
10	Heather Livingstone
Goaltenders
1	Tara Stevens
42	Julia Fair

==== Team Czech Republic Senior ====
The 2017 Czech Republic Senior team included the following:

CZECH REPUBLIC SENIOR

Pos.	Number	Name
Goalie	3	Ivana Berderkova
Goalie	23	Veronika Hulkova
	5	Lisa Raush
	9	Nina Beznoskova
	10	Tereza Soukupova
	13	Anna Pokorna
	15	Dominique Rodrigue
	16	Anniina Tuomola
	17	Nina Gegáňová
	18	Petra Herzigová
	19	Elysia Ford
	*19	Dita Svobodová
	21	Barbora Sebikova
	22	Adela Srbova
	29	Kateřina Svobodová
	31	Lenda Kubiskova
	32	Lenka Kobyláková
	38	Branická
	56	Kateřina Čapková
	71	Tereza Bobkova
	91	Petra Berankova
	95	Dominika Mokrosova
Team Staff
Manager		Dana Hůlková
Manager		Veronika Hůlková
Head coach
Assistant coach		Radek Dan, Lenka Kobyláková
Trainer		Jean-Guy Rodrigue

== See also ==
- World Ringette Championships
- International Ringette Federation
- Canada national ringette team
- Finland national ringette team
- Sweden national ringette team
- United States national ringette team
- Czech Republic national ringette team

Preceded by Helsinki 2016	World Ringette Championships; Mississauga; 2017 World Ringette Championships	Succeeded by Burnaby 2019
