= 2019 World Ringette Championships =

13th World Ringette Championships

Tournament details
- Host country: Canada
- City: Burnaby, British Columbia
- Venue: Bill Copeland Sports Centre
- Dates: November 25–December 1, 2019
- Teams: 7

Final positions
- Champions: Senior Pool; Sam Jacks Series: Finland (Sr.) (8th title) Junior Pool; Canada (Jr.) (3rd title) President's Pool Sweden (Sr.)
- Runners-up: Senior Pool; Sam Jacks Series: Canada (Sr.) Junior Pool; Finland (Jr.) President's Pool United States (Sr.)
- Third place: President's Pool; Czech Republic (Sr.)

The 2019 World Ringette Championships (2019 WRC) was an international ringette tournament and the 13th (XIII) World Ringette Championships. The tournament was organized by the International Ringette Federation (IRF) and was contested in Burnaby, British Columbia, Canada, from November 25 - December 1, 2019. The main competition took place at the Bill Copeland Sports Centre.

The games were recorded and live streamed by Sports Canada TV and have since been made available for public viewing on the video sharing site, YouTube, by Ringette Canada. Fifteen of the games were live-streamed online and made available for public viewing.

== Overview ==
Participating national teams in the included: Team Canada Senior, Team Canada Junior (U19), Team Finland Senior, Team Finland Junior (U19), Team Sweden Senior, Team USA Senior, and Team Czech Republic.

Team Finland Senior won the gold medal in the Senior Pool, a.k.a. the "Sam Jacks Series", and Team Canada Junior won the gold medal in the Junior Pool. In the President's Pool, Sweden claimed gold, the USA claimed silver, and the Czech Republic claimed the bronze.

== Venue ==
Bill Copeland Sports Centre
Host venue
Location	Canada – Burnaby, British Columbia
Constructed	
Capacity	2,000 seated

== Teams ==
Senior Pool	Junior Pool	President's Pool
2019 Team Finland Senior	2019 Team Finland Junior (U19)	2019 Team Sweden Senior
2019 Team Canada Senior	2019 Team Canada Junior (U19)	(United States) 2019 Team USA Senior
		2019 Team Czech Republic Senior

== Final standings ==
=== Senior Pool results ===
The Senior Pool competition, also known as the "Sam Jacks Series", was a three-game series between Team Canada Senior and Team Finland Senior. Team Finland Senior won the gold medal and the Sam Jacks Trophy.

	Team
1st place, gold medalist(s)	Team Finland Senior
2nd place, silver medalist(s)	Team Canada Senior

=== Junior Pool results ===
The Junior Pool competition was a three-game series between Team Canada Junior and Team Finland Junior. The winning team, Team Canada Junior, won the gold medal, the world junior title, and was rewarded with the new Juuso Wahlsten Trophy, the first year the trophy was introduced to the tournament.

	Team
1st place, gold medalist(s)	Team Canada Junior (U19)
2nd place, silver medalist(s)	Team Finland Junior (U19)

=== President's Pool results ===
The President's Pool involved junior (U19) athletes from Team Canada Junior and Team Finland Junior competing with the developing ringette countries. Team Sweden Senior won and was rewarded with a gold medal and the President's Trophy.

	Team
1st place, gold medalist(s)	Team Sweden Senior
2nd place, silver medalist(s)	(United States) Team USA Senior
3rd place, bronze medalist(s)	Team Czech Republic Senior

== Rosters ==
=== Seniors ===
==== Team Finland Senior ====
The 2019 Team Finland Senior team included the following:

FINLAND SENIOR
Number	Name
Forwards
5	Laura Kyllönen
9	Elina Tahvanainen
11	Susanna Tapani
12	Roosa Salonen
16	Riikka Sjogren
20	Maija Väyrynen
Centres
4	Marjukka Virta
10	Anne Pohjola
19	Camilla Ojapalo
Defence
3	Pauliina Auvinen
7	Milla Laakso
13	Katariina Kurikko
15	Emmi Merelä
17	Kaisa Viren
18	Miranda Välisaari
Goaltenders
30	Maria Perkkola
31	Kaisa Katajisto
32	Meini Kärnä

Team Staff
Position	Name
Team Manager	Susanna Saarela
Head Coach	Timo Himberg
Coach	Kim Forsblom
Trainer	Noora Nojonen
Trainer	Mika Salminen
Trainer	Pekka Takala

==== Team Canada Senior ====
The 2019 Team Canada Senior team competed in the 2019 World Ringette Championships. The 2019 Team Canada Senior team included the following:

CANADA SENIOR
Number	Name
Forwards
7	Jenny Snowdon
10	Erika Kiviaho
11	Allison Biewald
90	Erin Markle
91	Chantal St-Laurent
93	Jamie Bell
99	Laurence Larocque
Centres
2	Gillian Dreger
6	Kaitlyn Youldon (Assistant Captain)
9	Shaundra Bruvall
89	Dailyn Bell (Assistant Captain)
Defence
3	Annie Debaji
16	Chantal Gauthier
18	Melissa Misutka
19	Paige Lanteigne (Nosal)
28	Christianne Varty (Captain)
29	Erica Voss
98	Rachel Ung
Goaltenders
31	Laurie St-Pierre
33	Amy Clarkson
41	Jasmine LeBlanc
61	Breanna Beck

Team Staff
Position	Name
Head Coach	Barb Bautista
Assistant Coach	Carly Ross
Assistant Coach	Alexis Snowdon
Assistant Coach	Sharolyn Wouters
Assistant Coach	Keely Brown
Mental Performance Consultant	Carl Nienhuis
Head Athletic Therapist	Connie Klassen
Team Manager	Jocelyn MacLeod

=== Juniors ===
==== Team Finland Junior ====
The 2019 Team Finland Junior team included the following:

FINLAND JUNIOR
Number	Name
Forwards
4	Helmi Laivuori
9	Marianna Kuiko
16	Luana Perez
Centres
2	Taru Kylä-Kaila
5	Krista Lanteri
7	Ronja Lahtivirta
11	Jenna Hakkarainen
14	Taru Hämäläinen
15	Mikaela Saukkonen
18	Petra Hyökyvaara
20	Minka Tiihonen
Defence
6	Jemina Hakomaki
8	Milla Juusela
17	Minka Halttunen
21	Moona Passila
Goaltenders
30	Katariina Ek
31	Siiri Uusitalo
32	Oona Keskinen

Team Staff
Position	Name
Manager	Petra Ahokas
Head Coach	Vesa Lönngren
Assistant Coach	Ahto Kärnä
Assistant Coach	Nina Sundell
Trainer	Jari Koski
Trainer	Tony Samuelsson

==== Team Canada Junior ====
The 2019 Team Canada Junior team included the following:

CANADA JUNIOR
Number	Name
Forwards
4	Ann Sauve
10	Jasmine Ménard
11	Emilie Cunial
16	Ariane Sagala
17	Emma Kelly
27	Sara Plouffe
51	Mégane Fortin
66	Taylor Hildebrand
77	Britney Snowdon
95	Jasmina Morroni
Centre
2	Maddie MacLean
25	Emily Power
29	Laura Soper
Defence
7	Lydia Duncan
8	Meghan Hanton-Fong
28	Julie Vandal
52	Brett Van Nieuw Amerongen
71	Torrie Shennan
88	Marla Wheeler
Goaltenders
31	Grace MacKenzie
33	Marie-Ève Dubé
82	Kiana Heska

Team Staff
Position	Name
Head Coach	Lorrie Horne
Assistant Coach	Chris Belan
Assistant Coach	Carrie Hartley
Assistant Coach	Danielle Hildrebrand
Assistant Coach	Heather Konkin
Assistant Coach	Jacinda Rolph
Athletic therapist	Melinda Krulicki
Strength and Conditioning Coach	James Clock
Team Manager	Manon Bordeleau

On March 18, 2021, Ringette Canada announced that it had inducted the 2019 Junior National Team into the Ringette Canada Hall of Fame.

=== President's Pool ===
==== Team Sweden Senior ====
The 2019 Sweden Senior team included the following:

SWEDEN SENIOR
Number	Name
Forwards
6	Anna Norrbom
8	Emilia Riikola
18	Jennifer Peterback
20	Ellen Granath
Centres
3	Sarah Esmail Canada
21	Emilia Castañeda Månsson
22	Meri Ruuska
Defence
11	Wilma Frankenberg
12	Nilla Wernersson
13	Amanda Olofsson
17	Carolina Cordova
19	Camilla Lepistö
Goaltenders
30	Alexandra Väyrynen

Team Staff
Position	Name
Manager	Mats Peterback
Coach	Bruce Graham
Assistant Coach	Terry Abblett
Assistant Coach	Mark Baril
Assistant Coach	Eva Frankenberg
Assistant Coach	Gunilla Peterback

==== Team USA Senior ====
The 2019 USA Senior team included the following:

USA SENIOR
Number	Name
Forwards
10	Jaclyn Lovelett
15	Shaelyn Corasiniti
17	Tiffany Muylle
24	Carlye Thompson
37	Colleen Senecal
82	Haley Wickens
88	Britt Kleine
97	Chloe Field
Centres
8	Hilary Davidson
16	Grace Beggs
Defence
3	Moira Davidson
5	Elisabeth O'Sullivan
7	Lianne Bowman
9	Brianna Stanford
13	Brenda Rossetto
Goaltenders
30	Margot Ostrander
42	Julia Fair

Team Staff
Position	Name
Manager	Heather Graham
Manager	Tim Rossetto
Head Coach	Kari Sadoway
Assistant Coach	Haley Hill
Assistant Coach	Phyllis Sadoway
Assistant Coach	Beth Vallis
Trainer	Renee Hoppe
Trainer	Craig Wing

==== Team Czech Republic Senior ====
The 2019 Czech Republic Senior team included the following:

CZECH REPUBLIC SENIOR
Number	Name
Forwards
18	Sandra Majerová
19	Dita Svobodová
29	Kateřina Svobodová
32	Lenka Kobyláková
56	Kateřina Čapková
62	Veronika Kamasová
99	Kateřina Prokešová
Centres
31	Lenka Kubisková
33	Arran Arthur
91	Petra Volmutavá
Defence
5	Lisa Rausch
6	Petra Herzigová
17	Nina Gegáňová
38	Nina Branická
Goaltenders
3	Ivana Beděrková

Team Staff
Position	Name
Manager	Veronika Hůlková
Head Coach	Lenka Kobyláková
Assistant Coach	Dana Hůlková
Assistant Coach	Radek Husák
Assistant Coach	Andrej Jakubec
Assistant Coach	Jaroslav Volmut

== See also ==
- World Ringette Championships
- International Ringette Federation
- Canada national ringette team
- Finland national ringette team
- Sweden national ringette team
- United States national ringette team
- Czech Republic national ringette team

Preceded by Mississauga 2017	World Ringette Championships; Burnaby; 2019 World Ringette Championships	Succeeded by Espoo 2022
