= 2023 World Ringette Championships =

2023 edition of the World Ringette Championships

15th World Ringette Championships (60th anniversary of ringette)

Tournament details
- Host country: Canada
- City: Calgary
- Venue(s): 1 (in 1 host city)
- Dates: October 29 – November 4, 2023
- Teams: 7 plus International Festival teams

Final positions
- Champions: Junior U21 Pool Finland President's Pool USA
- Runners-up: Junior U21 Pool Canada President's Pool Sweden
- Third place: President's Pool Czechia
- 60th anniversary of ringette (est. 1963)

The 2023 World Ringette Championships (2023 WRC) was an international ringette tournament, the 15th (XV) World Ringette Championships, and was contested in Calgary, Alberta, Canada, from October 29 to November 4, 2023. The host venue for the event was the Canada Olympic Park (COP), WinSport Event Centre. It marked the 60th anniversary of the sport of ringette which was invented in 1963. The tournament was organized by the International Ringette Federation (IRF).

The 2023 World Ringette Championships featured teams from Team Canada and Team Finland who will compete in the national Junior U-21 Pool and the new U-18 Development tournament. As part of the competition, the President's Pool will include Team Sweden Senior, Team Czechia Senior, and the Team USA Senior which are considered developing ringette nations.

The IRF postponed the Senior Pool a.k.a. The Sam Jacks Series, until the 2025 World Ringette Championships. Therefore the general format for the world competition was changed: The U18 International Development Festival (Under-18), the U21 Junior Pool (Under-21), and a separate President's Pool for developing ringette nations.

== Overview ==
To preserve the existing competition cycle, the International Ringette Federation (IRF) committed to staging an international tournament in 2023. The tournament returns to Canada in 2023 to commemorate the 60th anniversary of ringette. The IRF has decided not to include the Sam Jacks pool (Senior Pool) in the 2023 tournament. It will return for the 2025 World Ringette Championships.

The IRF will include the following at the 2023 tournament:

- U21 World Junior Championship (existing)
- President’s Pool World Championship (existing)
- U18 International Development Event (new)

=== Junior U21 Pool ===
A Junior U-21 (Under 21) World Championship was a pool featuring Team Canada U21 and Team Finland U21.

The Juuso Wahlsten Trophy was awarded to the winner in the tournament and is named after Finland's, Juhani "Juuso" Wahlsten, who introduced ringette to Finland in 1979, the first European country to develop the sport.

=== U18 International Development Festival ===
Canada hosted its first-ever U-18 International Development Festival, featuring athletes from multiple countries. The event concluded with an international intersquad game, as well as Canada Red and Canada White games against Finland Blue and Finland White.

=== President's Pool ===
The President's Pool included the national ringette teams of Czechia, Sweden, and the USA.

The President's Pool competition is designed to help develop emerging ringette nations. The President's Trophy is the award presented to the best team in this tournament.

=== Senior Program ===
The Senior program did not compete in the 2023 World Championships, and will return in 2025.

== Teams ==
(*) = The Senior Pool is postponed for this tournament but returns for the 2025 World Ringette Championships. It is replaced for the 2023 WRC with two scrimmages between two Canadian teams, Team Canada Senior Red and Team Canada Senior White.

Junior Pool (U21)	President's Pool	International Development Festival (U18)	*Senior Program
2023 Team Canada Junior U21	2023 Team Sweden Senior	2023 U18 Team Canada White	2023 Team Canada Senior Red
2023 Team Finland Junior U21	(United States) 2023 Team USA Senior	2023 U18 Team Canada Black	2023 Team Canada Senior White
	2023 Team Czech Republic Senior	2023 Team Finland U18	

== Competing nations ==
Canada
Finland
Sweden
United States
(Czech Republic) Czechia

== Venues ==
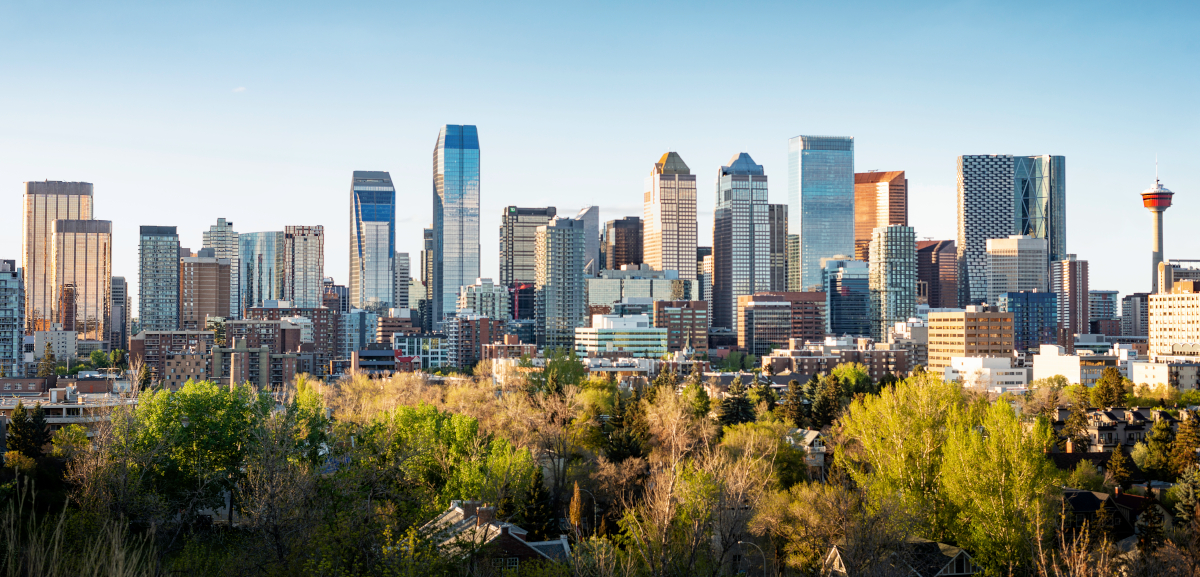
Calgary, Alberta, Canada

The tournament will be contested in Calgary, Alberta, Canada at the Canada Olympic Park (COP), WinSport Event Centre.

2023 WRC Venue
Calgary, Alberta, Canada

== Rosters ==
=== Junior U21 ===
==== Team Canada Junior ====
Players, team, coaching and support staff for 2023 Team Canada Junior U21 are as follows:

2023 TEAM CANADA JUNIOR U21
Number	Name	Position	Hometown/City	2022-23 Team
31	Kaylee Davies	Goalie	La Broquerie West, Manitoba	Eastman Flames, Team Manitoba – 2023 Canada Winter Games
30	Maddy Nystrom	Goalie	White City, Saskatchewan	Regina U19AA, Team Saskatchewan – 2023 Canada Winter Games
34	Paige Roy	Goalie	Calgary, Alberta	Calgary U19AA Rise, Team Alberta – 2023 Canada Winter Games
58	Kaylee Armstrong	Defence	Calgary, Alberta	Calgary U19AA Fusion, Team Alberta – 2023 Canada Winter Games
5	Mikyla Brewster	Defence	Calgary, Alberta	Calgary RATH (National Ringette League), Team Alberta – 2023 Canada Winter Games
14	Cayleigh Hasell	Defence	Calgary, Alberta	Calgary RATH (National Ringette League), Team Alberta – 2023 Canada Winter Games
20	Danika Osborne (Assistant)	Defence	Ottawa, Ontario	Gatineau Fusion (National Ringette League), Team Ontario – 2023 Canada Winter Games
22	Lauren Schoenhofen	Defence	Regina, Saskatchewan	Regina Bandits u19AA, Team Saskatchewan – 2023 Canada Winter Games
16	Kaleigh Ryan-York	Defence	Edmonton, Alberta	Edmonton WAM! (National Ringette League), Team Alberta – 2023 Canada Winter Games
33	Sydnie Rock	Defence	Calgary, Alberta	Calgary U19AA Rise, Team Alberta – 2023 Canada Winter Games
4	Mia Hemstreet	Centre	Calgary, Alberta	Calgary U19AA Fusion, Team Alberta – 2023 Canada Winter Games
11	Erin Ung (Captain)	Centre	Calgary, Alberta	Calgary RATH (National Ringette League), Team Alberta – 2023 Canada Winter Games
44	Regan Meier (Assistant)	Centre	Calgary, Alberta	Calgary U19AA Rise, Team Alberta – 2023 Canada Winter Games
3	Julia Franco	Forward	Montreal, Quebec	U19AA Lac Saint Louis, Team Québec – 2023 Canada Winter Games
77	Jazmyn Fevin	Forward	St. Albert, Alberta	St. Albert Mission u19AA, Team Alberta – 2023 Canada Winter Games
24	Brianna Jacobi	Forward	Elmira, Ontario	Waterloo Wildfire (National Ringette League), Team Ontario – 2023 Canada Winter Games
25	Laurence Lacombe	Forward	Repentigny, Quebec	Ringuette Repentigny, Team Québec – 2023 Canada Winter Games
97	Brittany Lanouette	Forward	Gatineau, Québec	Rivé Sud Revolution (National Ringette League)
19	Jalena Marelic	Forward	Ottawa, Ontario	Nepean Ravens (National Ringette League), Team Ontario – 2023 Canada Winter Games
6	Maxim Moisan	Forward	Cantley, Quebec	Gatineau Fusion (National Ringette League), Team Québec – 2023 Canada Winter Games
29	Manon Vautour	Forward	Dieppe, New Brunswick	Atlantic Attack (National Ringette League), Team New Brunswick – 2023 Canada Winter Games
10	Alex Violette	Forward	Gatineau, Quebec	Gatineau Fusion (National Ringette League), Team Québec – 2023 Canada Winter Games

2023 COACHING AND SUPPORT STAFF CANADA JUNIOR U21
Position	Name	Hometown/City
Team manager	Jocelyn Macleod	Winnipeg, Manitoba
Head coach	Andrea Ferguson	Winnipeg, Manitoba
Assistant coach	Keely Brown	Edmonton, Alberta
Assistant coach	Colleen Hagan	Ottawa, Ontario
Assistant coach	Donnell Schoenhofen	Regina, Saskatchewan
Athletic Therapist	Melinda Krulicki	Red Deer, Alberta
Mental Performance Coach	Jamie Bunka	Chestermere, Alberta
Strength & Conditioning Coach	James Clock	Ottawa, Ontario

==== Team Finland Junior ====
2023 TEAM FINLAND JUNIOR U21
Pos.	Num.	Name	Club
Goalie		Neea Hauta-alus	Ilves
Goalie		Hillevi Holmström	Helsinki Ringette
Goalie		Ella Salomaa	Lahti Ringette
Field Players
Pos.	Num.	Name	Club
		Emilia Hirvonen	Helsinki Ringette
		Emmi Juusela	Helsinki Ringette
		Julia Kangaskoski	Helsinki Ringette
		Karola Kosunen	Helsinki Ringette
		Lotta Kujala	Nokian Urheilijat
		Tuuli Laakkonen	Kiekko-Espoo
		Meeri Lonka	Helsinki Ringette
		Vilja Mäkelä	Forssan Palloseura Juniorit
		Emmi Metsä-Tokila	RNK Flyers
		Jenni Mikkola	Lahti Ringette
		Essi Sarmala	Blue Rings
		Teresa Tapani	Laitilan Jyske
		Emilia Tuominiemi	Järvenpään Haukat
		Iida Tuominiemi	Järvenpään Haukat
		Adele Vuorinen	Helsinki Ringette

2023 COACHING AND SUPPORT STAFF FINLAND JUNIOR U21
Position	Name	Hometown/City or Team
Team manager
Head coach	Nina Sundell
Assistant coach
Assistant coach
U21 Video coach	Vesa Lönngren
Youth goaltender coach	Tuomas Juusela	Helsinki Ringete SM

=== Senior ===
==== Team Canada Senior ====
2023 COACHING AND SUPPORT STAFF CANADA SENIOR
Position	Name	Hometown/City
Head coach	Julie Blanchette	Montreal, Quebec
Assistant coach	Jacqueline Gaudet	Cambridge, Ontario
Assistant coach	Stéphanie Séguin	Saint-Laurent, Quebec
Assistant coach	Barb Bautista	Ottawa, Ontario
Assistant coach	Claudia Jetté	Saint-Laurent, Quebec

=== U18 ===
==== Team Canada U18 White ====
Players, team coaching and support staff for 2023 Team Canada U18 White are as follows:

2023 U18 TEAM CANADA WHITE
Number	Name	Position	Hometown/City
29	Julia Harvie	Goalie	Surrey, British Columbia
33	Aeva Lott	Goalie	Red Deer, Alberta
6	Olivia Hwang	Defence	St. Albert, Alberta
9	Tobi Albert	Defence	Saskatoon, Saskatchewan
14	Karley Clark	Defence	Strathmore, Alberta
18	Ava Will	Defence	Calgary, Alberta
22	Taylor Johnston	Defence	Regina, Saskatchewan
5	Dylan Pighin	Centre	Water Valley, Alberta
8	Tessa Brown	Centre	Calgary, Alberta
13	Jemma Sangha	Centre	Anmore, British Columbia
24	Brianna Shupe	Centre	Regina, Saskatchewan
3	Tayte Arlinghaus	Forward	St Albert, Alberta
11	Anjali Risbud	Forward	Calgary, Alberta
16	Madison Fitzpatrick	Forward	Calgary, Alberta
21	Talisa Cowley	Forward	Langdon, Alberta
26	Lauren Lesko	Forward	Calgary, Alberta
77	Tessa Galandy	Forward	Strathmore, Alberta

2023 COACHING AND SUPPORT STAFF U18 TEAM CANADA WHITE
Position	Name	Hometown/City
Head coach	Danielle Brassington	Vancouver, British Columbia
Assistant coach	Caley Mineault	Edmonton, Alberta
Assistant coach	Daina Seymour	Regina, Saskatchewan

==== Team Canada U18 Black ====
Players, team coaching and support staff for 2023 Team Canada U18 Black are as follows:

2023 U18 TEAM CANADA BLACK
Number	Name	Position	Hometown/City
1	Cadence Howe	Goalie	Regina, Saskatchewan
33	Annabelle Sylvestre	Goalie	Beloeil, Quebec
9	Ceneviève Robichaud	Defence	Ottawa, Ontario
12	Cynthia Leblanc	Defence	Haute-Aboujagane, New Brunswick
19	Janie Bourque	Defence	Grand-Barachois, New Brunswick
64	Emma Mason	Centre/Defence	Belwood, Ontario
2	Charlotte Anderson	Centre/Forward	Ajax, Ontario
6	Morgan Forrest	Centre	Orleans, Ontario
10	Mia Fioravanti	Centre/Forward	Stittsville, Ontario
22	Sofia Morello	Centre	Pointe-Claire, Quebec
3	Katelyn Barteaux	Forward/Defence	Kanata, Ontario
16	Maya Howard	Forward	Ottawa, Ontario
17	Cassidy MacLeod	Forward/Centre	Cocagne, New Brunswick
77	Leah Mombourquette	Forward	McMasterville, Quebec
79	Ophélie Vivier	Forward	Stillwater Lake, Nova Scotia
91	Zoe Nagy	Forward	Boucherville, Quebec
99	Gabrielle Cosselin	Forward	Memramcook, New Brunswick

2023 COACHING AND SUPPORT STAFF U18 TEAM CANADA BLACK
Position	Name	Hometown/City
Head coach	Tracey Tulloch	Halifax, Nova Scotia
Assistant coach	Sarah Ianni	Toronto, Ontario
Assistant coach	Jessica Boisvert	Ottawa, Ontario

==== Team Finland U18 ====
2023 COACHING AND SUPPORT STAFF FINLAND U18
Position	Name
Manager	Ville Laine
Manager	Marko Lehtinen
Head Coach	Heidi Petrell
Assistant Coach	Opri Aromaa
Assistant Coach	Lotta Hallanaro
Assistant Coach	Kari Lahtivirta
Assistant Coach	Kirsi Pukkila
Assistant Coach	Pia Pullinen
Assistant Coach	Marianna Rautavirta
Goaltender Coach	Sini Mäkelä

==== Team USA U18 ====
Players, team coaching and support staff for 2023 Team USA U18 are as follows:

2023 U18 TEAM USA
Number	Name	Hometown/City
77	Audrey Theriault	Dieppe, New Brunswick
13	Hannah Giles	Edmonton, Alberta
27	Jordyn Jamer	Nepean, Ontario

2023 COACHING AND SUPPORT STAFF U18 TEAM USA
Position	Name	Hometown/City
Head coach	Brianna Stanford	Limerick, Pennsylvania

==== Team Czech U18 ====
Players for 2023 Team Czech U18 are as follows:

2023 U18 TEAM CZECH
Number	Name	Hometown/City
32	Senika Velisek	Vancouver, British Columbia

Preceded by Espoo 2022	World Ringette Championships; Calgary; 2023 World Ringette Championships	Succeeded by TBA 2025

== See also ==
- World Ringette Championships
- International Ringette Federation
- Canada national ringette team
- Finland national ringette team
- Sweden national ringette team
- United States national ringette team
- Czech Republic national ringette team
