= 2022 World Ringette Championships =

2022 edition of the World Ringette Championships

14th World Ringette Championships

Tournament details
- Host country: Finland
- City: Espoo
- Venues: 3 (in 1 host city)
- Dates: October 31–November 6, 2022
- Opened by: Sauli Niinistö
- Teams: 7

Final positions
- Champions: Senior Pool; Sam Jacks Series: Finland Sr. (9th title) Junior Pool; Finland Jr. U21 (2nd title) President's Pool United States Sr. (1st title)
- Runners-up: Senior Pool; Sam Jacks Series: Canada Sr. Junior Pool; Canada Jr. U21 President's Pool Sweden Sr.
- Third place: President's Pool; Czech Republic Sr.

Awards
- MVP: Seniors: Susanna Tapani Juniors: Minka Tiihonen

Official website
- WRC 2022

The 2022 World Ringette Championships (2022 WRC) was an international ringette tournament and the 14th (XIV) World Ringette Championships. The tournament was organized by the International Ringette Federation (IRF) and was contested in Espoo, Finland, from October 31 – November 6, 2022. The President of Finland, Sauli Niinistö, acted as a patron of the event. The previous world championships, the 2021 WRC, had been planned to be hosted by Finland in Helsinki, but were cancelled due to the COVID-19 pandemic.

The main event took place at the Espoo Metro Areena, located in the Tapiola sports park. One exhibition game took place at Marli Areena (Rajupaja Areena) in Turku, Finland, and another at the Kisakallio Sports Institute in Lohja. "Come Try Ringette" events were organized for schools in the area as well as the general public.

Three competitions took place take place: the Senior Pool (Seniors) a.k.a. Sam Jacks Pool, the Junior Pool (Juniors), and the President's Pool (developing ringette nations). The 2022 Junior competition included athletes who were Under-21 years of age (U21). Prior to the main competition, a series of exhibition games were played which included a different national teams and two Finland U18 teams: U18 2004 (players born in 2004) and U18 2005 (players born in 2005). A youth tournament was played at the Tapiola Arena (Finnish: Tapiolan Harjoitusjäähalli) and Matinkylä ice rinks.

Ringette Finland (Finnish: Suomen Ringetteliitto) and Kiekko-Espoo Ringette hosted "International Ringette Festival 2022", an international junior ringette tournament in Espoo from November 3 to November 6, 2022. The Festival included 16 teams, each in the age divisions of U16, U14 and U12, and was open to ringette teams from Canada, Finland, and Sweden. All teams played at least six games. U16 and U14 played 2 x 15 minutes (stopped clock) and U12 played 30 minutes (running time).

== Overview ==
The 2022 World Ringette Championships was the first World Ringette Championships since its cancellation in 2021 due to the COVID-19 pandemic. The deciding format for each winning team depended upon the division. While exhibition games were played, three major competitions took place in three different pools with different formats:

- Senior Pool: Known officially as the "Sam Jacks Series" or the "Sam Jacks Pool". The games are played in 4 x 15 minute quarters. Though this pool is traditionally a three-game-series between Team Canada Senior and Team Finland Senior, the 2022 WRC involved a two-game series. The winning team was awarded the senior world title, the senior gold medal, and the Sam Jacks Trophy.
- Junior Pool: The junior pool games were played in 4 x 15 minute quarters. Though this pool is traditionally a three-game-series between Team Canada Junior and Team Finland Junior, the 2022 WRC involved a two-game series. For the 2022 WRC the Junior Pool was organized for players Under-21 years of age (a.k.a. U21). The winning team was awarded the junior world title, the junior gold medal, and the Juuso Wahlsten Trophy.
- President's Pool: Teams from developing ringette countries included Team USA, Team Sweden, and Team Czech Republic. The winning team was awarded President's world title, the President's gold medal, and the President's Trophy.

=== Seniors ===
Senior players from Team Canada Senior, Team Finland Senior, Team Sweden Senior, Team Czech Republic, and Team USA Senior competed.

Team Finland and Team Canada competed in the Senior Pool. Team USA, Team Sweden, and Team Czech Republic competed in the President's Pool. Team Slovakia did not compete in the 2022 WRC.

=== Juniors ===
Junior players (Under-21) competed in the Junior Pool which included athletes from Team Canada Junior (U21) and Team Finland Junior (U21). Team USA, Team Sweden, and Team Czechia (Czech Republic) did not have junior national teams compete. Two youth Finland U18 (Under-18) teams also competed in two separate exhibition games.

=== Finland U18 exhibition ===
A series of exhibition games took place with two Finland U18 teams (Under-18) competing against the Team Sweden Seniors and the Team USA Seniors. The first Finnish team included players born in 2004 (Finland U18 2004) while the second included players born in 2005 (Finland U18 2005).

== Teams ==
Senior Pool	Junior Pool	President's Pool
2022 Team Finland Senior	2022 Team Finland Junior	2022 Team Sweden Senior
2022 Team Canada Senior	2022 Team Canada Junior	(United States) 2022 Team USA Senior
		2022 Team Czech Republic Senior

== Venues ==
The Espoo Metro Areena acted as the main venue for the 2022 World Ringette Championships. The Tapiola Ice Hall (Finnish: Tapiolan Harjoitusjäähalli) served as a venue for some of the 2022 WRC exhibition games, some of the President's Pool games, and also served as one of two venues for the youth tournament. The Matinkylä ice rink was used as another rink for the youth tournament.

One exhibition game was played in Turku at the Marli Areena (Rajupaja Areena), and another at the Kisakallio Sports Institute in Lohja.

=== Main venues ===
Espoo was the host of the 2022 WRC	Finland		Finland		Finland	
Espoo was the host of the 2022 WRC	Espoo		Espoo		Espoo	
Espoo was the host of the 2022 WRC	Host venue Espoo Metro Areena; Capacity: 6,982		Tapiola Ice Hall (Finnish: Tapiolan Harjoitusjäähalli) Capacity: Unknown		Matinkylä ice rink Capacity: Unknown	
Espoo was the host of the 2022 WRC	Constructed	1999	Constructed	Unknown	Constructed	Unknown

=== Exhibition venues ===
Exhibition games took place in Lohja and Turku	Finland		Finland	
Exhibition games took place in Lohja and Turku	Lohja		Kupittaa, Turku	
Exhibition games took place in Lohja and Turku	Exhibition venue Kisakallio Sports Institute; Capacity: Unknown		Exhibition venue Marli Areena "Rajupaja Areena" Capacity: 3,000	
Exhibition games took place in Lohja and Turku	Founded	1949	Constructed	Unknown; Rebuilt: 2006-07

== Game results ==
Three separate competitions took place: the Senior Pool, the Junior Pool (Under-21 years of age a.k.a. U21), and the President's Pool. Exhibition games were also contested. Two Finland U18 teams competed against the 2022 Sweden Senior team and the 2022 USA Senior team in exhibition.

=== Exhibition games ===
Exhibition; October 31; 3:30 pm	Finland (U18 2005)	16–1 (3–0, 4–0, 3–0, 6–1)	United States Senior	Kisakallio Sports Institute (Lohja); Attendance: 103

Game reference

Exhibition; October 31; 1:45 pm	Finland Junior (U21)	6–2 (1–0, 2–0, 3–2, 0–0)	Canada Junior (U21)	Tapiola Ice Hall (Tapiolan Harjoitusjäähalli); Attendance: 290

Game reference

Exhibition; November 1; 6:00 pm	Finland Senior	19-1 (7–0, 5–1, 3–0, 4–0)	Canada Senior	Marli Areena (Rajupaja Areena) – Turku, Finland; Attendance: 809

Game reference

Exhibition; November 1; 6:00 pm	Canada Junior (U21)	5–7 (1–1, 1–3, 1–1, 2–2)	Finland Junior (U21)	Tapiola Ice Hall (Tapiolan Harjoitusjäähalli); Attendance: 204

Game reference

Exhibition; November 2; 1:45 pm	Sweden Senior	3–11 (0–4, 2–1, 0–3, 1–3)	Finland (U18 2004)	Tapiola Ice Hall (Tapiolan Harjoitusjäähalli); Attendance: 327

Game reference

Exhibition; November 2; 6:00 pm	Canada Senior	2–10 (1–4, 1–2, 0–0, 0–4)	Finland Senior	Tapiola Ice Hall (Tapiolan Harjoitusjäähalli); Attendance: 374

Game reference

=== Senior Pool ===
The Senior Pool is also known as the "Sam Jacks Pool" or "Sam Jacks Series". The Senior Pool involved two games between the 2022 Team Canada Seniors and the 2022 Team Finland Seniors.

The Senior Pool champions were decided using a point system: 2 points for a win, 1 point for a tie, and 0 points for a loss. In the event of a tie game, overtime was not to be allowed in the first game but was to be allowed in the second game. If the second game had resulted in a tie, the teams were to play a period of overtime which would have been considered its own game and would have started from 0-0. The first overtime period would have been 15 minutes long. If there was no clear winner, a sudden-death overtime period was to be played next.

Seniors; November 4; 6:10 pm	Canada Senior	2–8 (0–4, 1–1, 1–2, 0–1)	Finland Senior	Espoo Metro Areena; Attendance: 3,428

Game reference

Seniors; November 6; 4:00 pm	Finland Senior	13–3 (4–0, 2–1, 1–1, 6–1)	Canada Senior	Espoo Metro Areena; Attendance: 2,881

Game reference

==== Points ====
Team	Pld	W	D	L	GF	GA	GD	Pts
Finland Senior	2	2	0	0	0	0	0	4
Canada Senior	2	0	0	2	0	0	0	0

Updated to match(es) played on unknown. Source:

=== Junior Pool ===
The Junior Pool was played between the 2022 Canadian Junior national team and the 2022 Finland Junior national team. The competition was for players Under-21 (U21).

The Junior Pool was played in the same format as the WRC 2022 Senior Pool with two-games and possible overtime periods planned if the second game had resulted in a tie. Sudden-death overtime was to be played if the first overtime period resulted in a tie.

Juniors; November 3; 6:00 pm	Canada Junior (U21)	0–10 (0–5, 0–2, 0–1, 0–2)	Finland Junior (U21)	Espoo Metro Areena

Juniors; November 5; 4:00 pm	Finland Junior (U21)	12–0 (5–0, 3–0, 3–0, 1, 0)	Canada Junior (U21)	Espoo Metro Areena

==== Points ====
Team	Pld	W	D	L	GF	GA	GD	Pts
Finland Junior (U21)	2	2	0	0	0	0	0	4
Canada Junior (U21)	2	0	0	2	0	0	0	0

Updated to match(es) played on unknown. Source:

=== President's Pool ===
Three countries competed in the President's Pool: Team USA Senior, the Team Czech, and Team Sweden Senior. Each team played two games against each other. Teams collected points per game: a win was worth 2 points and a loss resulted in 0 points. If a game resulted in a tie, the game was planned to go into sudden-death overtime.

The winner of the first round advanced directly to the final. Second and third in the pool played in the playoffs where the winner there faced the winner of the first round in the final. The winner of the final was the winner of the President's Pool and was awarded with the President's Pool gold medal and the President's Trophy.

President's; October 31; 10:00 am	Czech Republic Senior	3–14	United States Senior	Tapiola Arena (Tapiolan Harjoitusjäähalli); Attendance: 2

Game reference

President's; October 31; 6:00 pm	Sweden Senior	13–5	Czech Republic Senior	Tapiola Arena (Tapiolan Harjoitusjäähalli); Attendance: 116

Game reference

President's; November 1; 12:00 pm	Sweden Senior	7–4	United States Senior	Tapiola Arena (Tapiolan Harjoitusjäähalli); Attendance: 246

Game reference

President's; November 2; 10:00 am	United States Senior	14–2	Czech Republic Senior	Tapiola Arena (Tapiolan Harjoitusjäähalli); Attendance: 342

Game reference

President's; November 3; 12:00 pm	Czech Republic Senior	6–7	Sweden Senior	Tapiola Arena (Tapiolan Harjoitusjäähalli); Attendance: 148

Game reference

President's; November 4; 11:30 am	United States Senior	4–5 (2–1, 1–2, 0–2, 1–0)	Sweden Senior	Espoo Metro Areena; Attendance: 1168

Game reference

President's BRONZE; November 5; 12:00 pm	United States Senior	15–4	Czech Republic Senior

President's FINAL; November 6; 12:00 pm	Sweden Senior	1–4	United States Senior

==== Points ====
Team	Pld	W	D	L	GF	GA	GD	Pts
United States Senior	4	2	0	2	0	0	0	4
Sweden Senior	4	4	0	0	0	0	0	8
Czech Republic Senior	4	0	0	4	0	0	0	0

Updated to match(es) played on unknown. Source:

== Final standings ==
=== Senior Pool results ===
	Team
1st place, gold medalist(s)	Finland Senior
2nd place, silver medalist(s)	Canada Senior

=== Junior Pool results ===
	Team
1st place, gold medalist(s)	Finland Junior (U21)
2nd place, silver medalist(s)	Canada Junior (U21)

=== President's Pool results ===
	Team
1st place, gold medalist(s)	United States Senior
2nd place, silver medalist(s)	Sweden Senior
3rd place, bronze medalist(s)	Czech Republic Senior

== Awards ==
=== Junior MVP ===
MVP's for Junior Pool Game 1

- Team Canada Junior #51 Mégane Fortin
- Team Finland Junior #12 Minka Levander

MVP's for Junior Pool Game 2

- Team Canada Junior #14 Vail Ketsa
- Team Finland Junior #20 Minka Tiihonen

MVP's for each team in the Junior Pool

- Team Canada #14 Vail Ketsa
- Team Finland #20 Minka Tiihonen

MVP for 2022 World Ringette Championships Juniors

- Team Finland Jr #20 Minka Tiihonen

=== Senior MVP ===
MVP's for Senior Pool (Sam Jacks Pool) Game 1

- Team Finland #10 Anne Pohjola
- Team Canada #7 Jenny Snowdon

MVP's for Senior Pool (Sam Jacks Pool) Game 2

- Team Finland #30 Maria Perkkola
- Team Canada #2 Gillian Dreger

MVP's for each team in the Sam Jacks Pool

- Team Finland #10 Anne Pohjola
- Team Canada #7 Jenny Snowdon

MVP for 2022 World Ringette Championships Seniors

- Team Finland #11 Susanna Tapani

== Rosters ==
=== Seniors ===
==== Team Finland Senior ====
The 2022 Team Finland Senior team included the following:

FINLAND SENIOR
Number	Position	Name
6	Forward	Helmi Laivuori
9	Forward	Kaisa Hurske
12	Forward	Roosa Salonen
13	Forward	Kattariina Kurikko (Assistant Captain)
10	Centre	Anne Pohjola (Assistant Captain)
11	Centre	Susanna Tapani (Captain)
19	Centre	Camilla Ojapalo
20	Centre	Maija Väyrynen
22	Centre	Marianna Kuiko
33	Centre	Riikka Sjögren
5	Defence	Jasmin Kiiski
7	Defence	Hanna Ovaska
15	Defence	Emmi Merelä
17	Defence	Kaisa Viren
18	Defence	Miranda Välisaari
30	Goalie	Maria Perkkola
31	Goalie	Kaisa Katajisto
32	Goalie	Hanna Minkkinen

Team Staff
Position	Name
Team Manager	Sanna Alanko
Communications Manager	Yvonne Koch
Head Coach	Pasi Kataja
Assistant Coach	Marjukka Virta
Assistant Coach	Eevi Kaasinen
Goalkeeper Coach	Aura Lehtonen
Physiotherapist	Sami Aalto
Sports psychologist (certified)	Janica Järvenpää
Trainer	Mika Salminen
Trainer	Pekka Takala

==== Team Canada Senior ====
The 2022 Team Canada Senior team competed in the 2022 World Ringette Championships. The 2022 Team Canada Senior team included the following:

CANADA SENIOR
Pos.	Number	Name
Goalie	29	Grace MacKenzie
Goalie	31	Laurie St-Pierre
Goalie	41	Jasmine LeBlanc
Pos.	Number	Name
Defence	11	Emilie Cunial
Defence	18	Melissa Misutka (Assistant Captain)
Defence	19	Nicole Pelletier
Defence	27	Camille Dumont
Defence	28	Julie Vandal
Defence	52	Brett Van Nieuw Amerongen
Defence	70	Lydia Duncan
Pos.	Number	Name
Forward	4	Ann Sauve
Forward	6	Molly Chorney
Forward	7	Jenny Snowdon (Assistant Captain)
Forward	9	Nina Tajbakhsh
Forward	10	Erika Kiviaho (Captain)
Forward	77	Britney Snowdon
Forward	99	Laurence Larocque
Pos.	Number	Name
Centre	2	Gillian Dreger
Centre	8	Marie-Pier Blanchard
Centre	17	Torrie Shennan
Centre	26	Émily Chénier
Centre	75	Danielle Bechard

TEAM STAFF (CANADA SENIOR)
Position	Name
Team manager	Jen Falloon
Head coach	Lorrie Horne
Assistant coach	Julie Blanchette
Assistant coach	Heather Konkin
Assistant coach	Jacinda Rolph
Assistant coach	Chris Belan
INTEGRATED SUPPORT TEAM (CANADA SENIOR)
Position	Name
Lead Scout	Chris Belan
Strength & Conditioning Consultant	James Clock
Performance Dietician	Kelly Dragger
Head Athletic Therapist	Connie Klassen
Mental Performance Consultant	Laura Pollice
Mental Performance Consultant	Jamie Bunka
RINGETTE CANADA HIGH PERFORMANCE STAFF (CANADA SENIOR)
Position	Name
Manager of High Performance & Athlete Services	Stephanie Laurin
High Performance; Director	Frances Losier
OFFICIALS (CANADA SENIOR)
Position	Name
On-ice official	Geri Lamers
On-ice official	Robert Drury
On-ice official	Alexander Hanes

=== Juniors ===
==== Team Finland Junior ====
A total of 18 players competed for the U21 team in 2022. Two separate teams, Finland U18, competed against national teams who were in the 2022 President's Pool. One team involved players born in 2004, the other in 2005.

FINLAND JUNIOR (U21)
Number	Name
Forwards
7	Emmi Juusela
9	Kia Kosunen (Assistant Captain)
10	Meeri Lonka
12	Minka Levander
13	Essi Sarmala
18	Iina Kupiainen
19	Mette Nurminen
17	Vilma Tuominiemi
15	Eerika Viro
Centres
11	Jenna Hakkarainen
20	Minka Tiihonen
Defence
3	Enni Ojala (Captain)
5	Karola Kosunen
6	Maria Wetterstrand (Assistant Captain)
14	Kia Erkkilä
16	Emilia Hirvonen
Goaltenders
30	Mona Rytkönen
31	Siiri Uusitalo

Team staff
Position	Name
Team Manager	Petra Ahokas
Communications Manager	Viivi Väätänen
Head Coach	Nina Sundell
Assistant Coach	Petra Ojaranta
Goalie Coach	Aura Lehtonen
Video Coach	Vesa Lönngren
Trainer	Tony Samuelsson
Trainer	Jari Koski
Physiotherapist	Noora Nojonen

==== Team Canada Junior ====
The 2022 Team Canada Junior Under-21 team (U21) was chosen during a selection camp held in Mississauga, Ontario. For 2022 WRC, athletes were named to Ringette Canada's, "Junior National Travelling Team Roster". This roster was made up of 20 "Playing Roster" athletes, and 2 "Development Roster" athletes. Development Roster athletes were only added to the Playing Roster if the athlete was deemed unfit to play for medical reasons and thus needed to be removed from the Playing Roster.

CANADA JUNIOR (U21)
Number	Name
Forwards
2	Cloé LeBlanc
5	Mikyla Brewster
14	Vail Ketsa
16	Nicole Girardin
17	Emma Kelly (Assistant Captain)
51	Mégane Fortin (Assistant Captain)
93	Erika Neubrand (Cambridge Turbos)
Centres
11	Erin Ung
19	Belle Paisley
81	Alexsi Kavvadas
Defence
9	Katherine Shaughnessy (Cambridge Turbos)
10	Jasmine Menard
23	Geneviève Belliveau
26	Tatum Allen (Cambridge Turbos)
44	Regan Meier
58	Kaylee Armstrong
88	Marla Wheeler (Captain)
Goaltenders
1	Holland Kozan
30	Rachael Pelisek
34	Paige Roy
Development Roster Athletes
3	Quinn Ladoon
97	Jalena Marelic

Team Staff
Position	Name
Head Coach	Mark Beal
Assistant Coach	Colleen Hagan
Assistant Coach	Keely Brown
Assistant Coach	Andrea Ferguson
Athletic Therapist	Melinda Krulicki
Team Manager	Jocelyn MacLeod
Mentor Coach	Shelley Coolidge
Officials
On-ice official	Geri Lamers
On-ice official	Robert Drury
On-ice official	Alexander Hanes

=== Finland U18 ===
Two separate teams, Finland U18 2004 (players born in 2004) and Finland U18 2005 (players born in 2005) competed against the 2022 teams of Team Sweden Senior and Team USA Senior.

==== Finland U18 2004 ====
FINLAND U18 2004
Name
Hillevi Holmström
Emilia Sormunen
Neea Hauta-Alus
Jenni Mikkola
Emilia Tuominiemi
Saaga Tuomi
Emmi Rantakari
Iida Tuominiemi
Satu Reunanen
Pihla Alapuranen
Tuuli Hämäläinen
Saani Hietanen
Sara Huttunen
Ida Suokas
Inka Tuulaniemi
Nicole Thesleff
Ella Karhu

==== Finland U18 2005 ====
FINLAND U18 2005
Name
Suvi Saarinen
Milja Lillvist
Tuuli Laakkonen
Katariina Maikola
Mimosa Kyttälä
Emilia Nurmikoski
Milka Mikkola
Oona Rantala
Lulu Karttunen
Sofia Saarela
Noona Pursiainen
Vilma Jokipii
Pinja Toivonen
Sini Pelkonen
Hanna Kauppinen
Nea Konttinen
Emma Usvala

=== President's Pool ===
==== Team Sweden Senior ====
The 2022 Sweden Senior team included the following:

SWEDEN SENIOR
Pos.	Number	Name
Goalie	35	Kaisa Juntunen
Goalie	1	Erica Richardson
Pos.	Number	Name
	2	Sara Klint
	3	Sarah Esmail (Canada)
	4	Kajsa Frankenberg
	6	Anna Norrbom (Assistant Captain)
	7	Maja Andersson
	9	Jessica Alakärppä
	11	Wilma Frankenberg
	12	Nilla Wernersson (Assistant Captain)
	13	Amanda Olofsson
	17	Carolina Cordova
	18	Jennifer Peterback
	20	Ellen Granath
	21	Emilia Castañeda Månsson
	22	Saga Bergström
	23	Alma Lindqvist
	24	Jessika Runolf Lindqvist (Captain)
Team Staff
Head coach	Bruce Graham
Assistant coach	Rachel Graham
Assistant coach
Trainer

==== Team USA Senior ====
The 2022 Team USA Senior team included the following:

USA SENIOR
Number	Name
Forwards
7	Cadence Pirtle (Canada)
12	Campbell Schnurr
14	Nyah Bodnarchuk (Canada)
15	Shaelyn Corasiniti (Captain) (Canada)
17	Tiffany Muylle
25	Renee Hoppe (Captain)
37	Denise Berry
Centre
8	Hilary Davidson (Captain)
10	Jaclyn Lovelett
82	Haley Wickens
Defence
2	Madison Broadhurst
3	Moira Davidson (Captain)
4	Diana Coolidge (Canada)
5	Ellie O'Sullivan
6	Sara Hayami
9	Brianna Stanford
11	Brianna Faber
Goaltenders
1	Brianna Burke
31	Ashley Steele

Team Staff
Position	Name
Manager	Heather Graham
Assistant Manager	Keith Graham
Head Coach	Kari Sadoway
Assistant Coach	Phyllis Sadoway
Assistant Coach	Beth Vallis
Assistant Coach	Jason Sjostram
Assistant Coach	Devon Lowe (Canada)

==== Team Czech Republic Senior ====
The 2022 Czech Republic Senior team included the following:

CZECH REPUBLIC SENIOR
Pos.	Number	Name
Goalie	23	Veronika Hulková
Goalie	99	Kateřina Prokešová
Pos.	Number	Name
Defence	2	Avery Larmour
Defence	17	Nina Gegánová
Defence	21	Babora Šebíková
Defence	88	Petra Volmutová
Pos.	Number	Name
Forward	3	Tereza Nademlejnská
Forward	12	Alena Kančiová
Forward	13	Thea Cazzanti
Forward	16	Michelle Bettauer
Forward	19	Dita Svobodová
Forward	25	Šarlota Tomasco
Forward	29	Kateřina Svobodová
Forward	32	Lenka Kobyláková
Forward	34	Tereza Kašparová
Forward	62	Veronika Kamasová
Pos.	Number	Name
Centre	31	Lenka Kubisková
Centre	33	Arran Arthur
Centre	81	Karolina Kosinová
TEAM STAFF
Head coach		Lenka Kobyláková
Assistant coach		Andrej Jakubec, Radek Husák, Helen Bettauer, Kateřina Svobodová
Manager		Veronika Hůlková
Trainer

== See also ==
- World Ringette Championships
- International Ringette Federation
- Canada national ringette team
- Finland national ringette team
- Sweden national ringette team
- United States national ringette team
- Czech Republic national ringette team

Preceded by Burnaby 2019	World Ringette Championships; Espoo; 2022 World Ringette Championships	Succeeded by Calgary 2023
