= World Ringette Championships =

International ringette tournament

- Current season, competition or edition: 2023 World Ringette Championships
- Sport: Ringette
- First season: 1990; 36 years ago
- No. of teams: Differing: Senior Pool; Junior Pool; President's Pool; U18 International Development Festival; Senior Pool; Sam Jacks Series: Canada Senior; Finland Senior Junior Pool; Canada Junior; Finland Junior President's Pool (Differing): (United States) USA (Sr.); Sweden (Sr.); Sweden (Jr.) (Czech Republic) Czech (Sr.); Slovakia (Sr.); Canada (Jr.); Finland (Jr.) U18 International Development Festival (Differing): Other: Russia (Sr.); France (Sr.)
- Countries: World
- Most recent champions: (gold) Senior: Finland (gold) Junior; Finland
- Most titles: (gold) Senior: Finland (9 titles since 1996) (gold) Junior: Canada (3 titles since 2013)
- Website: www.worldringette.com

Notes
- 1998 World Ringette Championships became the 1998 EuroTour Summit Series; The 2021 World Ringette Championships was cancelled due to the COVID-19 pandemic

The World Ringette Championships (WRC) is the premier international competition in ringette and is governed by the International Ringette Federation (IRF). Unlike most international competitions, all of the WRC's elite athletes are female rather than male, one of the sport's distinctive features. Competing nations include: Canada, Finland, United States, Sweden, Slovakia and the Czech Republic, with Team Canada and Team Finland having emerged as the sport's top two competing nations. The 2023 World Ringette Championships were held in Calgary, Alberta, Canada and was the sport's 60th anniversary.

Competition consists of teams competing in one of four pools: the Senior Pool (Sam Jacks Series), the Under–21, U21 Pool (formerly called the Junior Pool) the President's Pool, and the new U18 International Development Festival which began in 2023.

The "Sam Jacks Series" is the name of the Senior Pool which is the tournament's elite competition between Team Canada Senior and Team Finland Senior with the Sam Jacks Trophy awarded to the team who wins the world senior title. The U21 Pool is now the tournament's elite competition between Team Canada U21 and Team Finland U21 with the Juuso Wahlsten Trophy awarded to the team who wins the world U21 title. The President's Pool is the tournament's competition between developing ringette nations with a smaller presence in the sport. Team Sweden Senior, Team USA Senior, and Team Czech Republic Senior compete in this pool and the President's Trophy is awarded to the winning team. National teams including Team Slovakia, Team Russia, and Team France, have also competed in the WRC past.

The nations of Canada and Finland form the most significant international rivalry at the world level which means the rivalry does not exist exclusively between North American teams. Nations like the United States, Sweden, and the Czech Republic have yet to produce top tier talent and these three countries form the international rivalry at a lower tier. One of the three countries are expected to eventually produce the first team to break the top two-team international barrier between Canada and Finland, though Slovakia, Russia and France have also competed. Neither Team Russia nor Team France have competed in the senior division at the World Ringette Championships since WRC 1996, and neither country has sent a junior, U21, or U19 national ringette team to compete since the 2012 World Junior Ringette Championships. Team Slovakia has not competed since WRC 2016 and has not created a junior, U19, or U21 national team.

The inaugural year for the WRC was in 1990 and the World Ringette Summit Series took place in Europe in 1998. The 2021 WRC was cancelled due to the COVID-19 pandemic. Several WRC competitions have been recorded and been made available for viewing online for free.

Unlike most international team sports tournaments, the World Ringette Championship competition consists entirely of elite female athletes due to the sport's dedication to providing girls and women with a sport of their own which has also allowed it to be free from the administrative responsibilities necessary to govern both a male and female category of the sport. This approach has also resulted in the ability to avoid male-to-female comparisons and has given the spotlight to elite female athletes.

== History ==
Between 1990–1996 and 2000–2004 the World Ringette Championships were arranged every other year. In 1998 no official World Championships were held but Finland and Canada played several exhibition games touring across Europe in what was called the Summit Series. The WRC's have been held every two or three years since the 2004 World Ringette Championships were hosted in Sweden.

The competition is organized by the international governing body for the sport, the International Ringette Federation (IRF), which was initially called the World Ringette Council. The council is believed to have eventually changed its name to the IRF to avoid confusion due to the fact that the acronym for the organization (WRC) was identical to the World Ringette Championship.

While the first World Ringette Championship began in 1990, the competition between individual nations technically began in 1996. Initially the tournament was exclusively contested between adult national ringette teams until 2013 when the junior division was added, having merged from a separate junior tournament, the World Junior Ringette Championships. For a time, a separate world ringette club competition also existed, the Ringette World Club Championship, but it too has since been discontinued.

In 2013 the IRF created a new and separate competition for the World Championship, naming the division the "President's Pool", which allows athletes and teams from countries with less ringette experience and a smaller presence in the sport new opportunities to compete. The presidents' Pool occasionally involves junior teams from Canada and Finland competing with the developing ringette countries.

With the exception of the 2022 World Ringette Championships, today both the senior and junior competitions for the world title typically involve a best of three playoff series between national Canadian and Finnish ringette teams in their respective age groups, with the senior competition now having been dubbed the "Sam Jacks Series". The WRC 2022 tournament scheduled a two-game series instead of a three-game series.

=== First World Ringette Championships ===
The first World Ringette Championship was held in Gloucester, Ontario in 1990 where the first ever Sam Jacks Trophy was awarded to a representative Canadian team from Alberta, the sport's first World Ringette champions. Participating teams included six regional teams from Canada, national teams from Finland, and the United States. Team Alberta, a.k.a. the "Calgary Debs" won the inaugural championship, marking Canada's reputation as the leading country in the sport.

== Competition format ==
The competitive structure is divided into four separate competitions: the Senior Pool (called the "Sam Jacks Series"), the Junior Pool, and the President's Pool, and the U18 International Development Festival, which was newly introduced by the International Ringette Federation for the 2023 World Ringette Championships.

=== Senior Pool ===
The Senior Pool is typically played in a best-of-three playoff format between Canada's Senior national team, and Finland's Senior national team, but the 2022 World Ringette Championships scheduled a two-game series instead. The winning Senior team is awarded with the world title, gold medals, and the championship trophy called the Sam Jacks Trophy, named after Sam Jacks.

Each Senior Pool game is played in a 4 x 15-minute quarter format. The Senior Pool did not exist until 2013 and was created when the junior program was added to the world program that same year. Prior to that point there was only a single event for adults and young adults.

=== Junior Pool ===
The Junior Pool competition is now called the U21 Pool (includes players under 21 years of age). At times it involved teams with players who were under 19 years of age (U19). The winning team in this pool is awarded with the world title for this age division, gold medals, and the Juuso Wahlsten Trophy, named after Juhani Wahlsten.

The pool is typically played in a best-of-three playoff format between Canada's U21 national team, and Finland's U21 national team, however, the 2022 World Ringette Championships scheduled a two-game series instead. Each game in this pool is played in a 4 x 15-minute quarter format.

Prior to the 2013 World Ringette Championships the junior program was held as a separate event in 2009 and 2012. It has since changed to include either players who were exclusively under 19 years of age or exclusively under 21.

=== President's Pool ===
The President's Pool is a competition between developing ringette nations. Each President's Pool game is played in a 4 x 15-minute quarter format. The winning team is awarded with the President's Pool world title, gold medals, and the President's Trophy. Occasionally, teams in this pool have competed against the junior teams from Canada and Finland.

=== U18 International Development Festival ===
The International Ringette Federation (IRF) unveiled a new feature for the 2023 World Ringette Championships: the U18 International Development Festival, where young players from around the world can showcase their skills and passion for the sport.

== Trophies ==
=== Senior Pool Trophy ===
The Sam Jacks Trophy is awarded to the winning national senior level ringette team. The trophy was named after Canada's Sam Jacks in his honour since Jacks is considered the main inventor of the sport. The trophy was donated by the family of Sam Jacks.

The first Sam Jacks Trophy was awarded in Gloucester, Ontario during the 1990 World Ringette Championships. The trophy was designed by a woman from Gloucester, Ontario, and was made of oak and bronze and was roughly 3 feet tall, but had to be rolled out onto the ice on a table because it was too heavy for the winning team from Canada to lift. In 1996 the trophy was replaced with a new design which has been awarded during every World Ringette Championship year since, while the initial trophy now resides in the Ringette Canada office.

=== Junior Pool Trophy ===
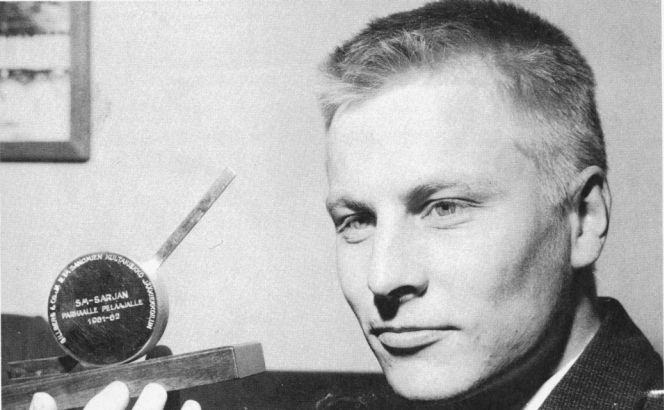
Juhani "Juuso" Wahlsten

The Juuso Wahlsten Trophy was introduced during the 2019 World Ringette Championships in Burnaby, Alberta, Canada. It was the first time the World Ringette Junior Champions were with presented with the new trophy. The trophy is named after Juhani "Juuso" Wahlsten, the "Father of Ringette" in Finland. The trophy was donated by Finland's Sini Forsblom, a former Team Finland athlete and also former President of the International Ringette Federation.

Wahlsten is the only member of the International Ice Hockey Hall of Fame in history to have had an international ringette trophy named in his honour.

=== President's Pool Trophy ===
The winner of the President's Pool Division is awarded the President's Trophy which was first introduced during the 2013 World Ringette Championships. The presidents' Pool involves a competition between developing ringette countries. Occasionally junior teams from Canada and Finland have competed against the nations who compete in this pool.

== World Ringette Championships results ==
The first time the World Ringette Championships involved Senior teams representing individual nations exclusively was during the 1996 World Ringette Championships. The first time the World Ringette Championships involved Junior teams representing individual nations exclusively was during the 2013 World Ringette Championships.

=== Senior ===
Senior champions
| Year | Location | Gold | Silver | Bronze |
|---|---|---|---|---|
| 1990 Details | (Canada) Gloucester | Team Alberta (Calgary Debs) | Team Ontario | Team Quebec |
| 1992 Details | (Finland) Helsinki | Canada West (Team Alberta "AAA") | Canada East | Finland |
| 1994 Details | (United States) Saint Paul | Finland | Canada East | Canada West |
| 1996 Details | (Sweden) Stockholm | Canada | Finland | (United States) USA |
| 1998 Details | (Finland) Turku (Sweden) Gothenburg (Germany) Osnabrück (France) Colmar | 1998 Summit Series between Canada and Finland; Finland won the Ringette 1998 Summit Series 3-2 | | |
| 2000 Details | (Finland) Espoo and Lahti | Finland | Canada | (United States) USA |
| 2002 Details | (Canada) Edmonton | Canada | Finland | (United States) USA |
| 2004 Details | (Sweden) Stockholm | Finland | Canada | (United States) USA |
| 2007 Details | (Canada) Ottawa | Finland | Canada | Sweden |
| 2010 Details | (Finland) Tampere | Finland | Canada | (United States) USA |
"Sam Jacks Series" begins Team Canada Senior Team Finland Senior
| Year | Location | Gold | Silver | Bronze |
| 2013 Details | (Canada) North Bay | Finland | Canada | (United States) USA |
| 2016 Details | (Finland) Helsinki | Finland | Canada | Sweden |
| 2017 Details | (Canada) Mississauga | Finland | Canada | Sweden |
| 2019 Details | (Canada) Burnaby | Finland | Canada | Sweden |
| 2021 Details | (Finland) Helsinki | cancelled due to COVID-19 pandemic | | |
| 2022 Details | (Finland) Espoo | Finland | Canada | (United States) USA |
| 2023 Details | Postponed until 2025 | Postponed until 2025 | Postponed until 2025 | Postponed until 2025 |
| 2025 Details | (Finland) Lahti | Finland | Canada | |

=== Junior ===
The junior age division is now called the U21 division (players under 21 years of age).

The first World Junior Ringette Championships took place in 2009 and was exclusively created for national junior ringette teams and operated as a separate tournament from the main event, the World Ringette Championships, which was exclusively for senior teams. In 2013 the junior program merged with the larger senior competition and the junior program ceased to exist as a separate tournament as a result.

Today the World competition includes both senior and U21 pools. As of 2017, the junior pool (now U21) was split and a third pool was added, the "President's Pool", created for developing ringette nations; Team Canada Junior and Team Finland Junior used to compete in the Junior Pool, but now compete in the U21 Pool.

Junior, U19, U21 champions
| Year | Location | Gold | Silver | Bronze |
|---|---|---|---|---|
| 2009 Details | (Czech Republic) Prague | Finland White Stars | Canada East | Finland Blue Stars |
| 2012 Details | (Canada) London | Canada East | Finland U19/U21 | Canada West |
| 2013 Details | (Canada) North Bay | Finland U19 | Canada U19 | |
| 2016 Details | (Finland) Helsinki | Canada U19/U21 | Finland U19/U21 | Sweden Senior |
| 2017 Details | (Canada) Mississauga | Canada U19/U21 | Finland U19/U21 | |
| 2019 Details | (Canada) Burnaby | Canada U19/U21 | Finland U19/U21 | |
| 2021 Details | (Finland) | cancelled due to COVID-19 pandemic | | |
| 2022 Details | (Finland) Espoo | Finland U21 | Canada U21 | |
| 2023 Details | (Canada) Calgary | Finland U21 | Canada U21 | |

=== President's ===
President's champions
| Year | Location | Gold | Silver | Bronze |
|---|---|---|---|---|
| 2013 Details | (Canada) North Bay | Finland U19 | Canada U19 | (United States) USA Seniors |
| 2017 Details | (Canada) Mississauga | Sweden | (United States) USA | Czech Republic |
| 2019 Details | (Canada) Burnaby | Sweden | (United States) USA | Czech Republic |
| 2021 Details | (Finland) | cancelled due to COVID-19 pandemic | | |
| 2022 Details | (Finland) Espoo | (United States) USA | Sweden | Czech Republic |
| 2023 Details | (Canada) Calgary | (United States) USA | Sweden | Czech Republic |
| 2025 Details | (Finland) Lahti | Sweden | (United States) USA | Czech Republic |

== Participation details ==
The Sam Jacks Series is the elite competition between the senior national ringette teams of Canada and Finland. The World Junior Ringette Championships and the Ringette World Club Championship were both initially organized as a separate events but the junior competition has since been merged with the World Ringette Championship while the club competition is no longer contested. The Junior division (U19) was added to the larger program in 2013. The President's Pool division was added in 2016. National teams participating have included: Canada, Finland, United States, Sweden, Russia, France, Slovakia, and the Czech Republic. Russia and France have not sent national teams from their respective countries to compete in the senior division in the world championships since 1996, and neither has sent a junior national ringette team to compete since 2012.

=== Senior ===
- Teams in italics no longer compete at the World Championships as of 2021.
- Cells in the table below with a red border indicate the host country for the tournament which took place that year.

Seniors: 1990–1994
| Team | 1990 | 1992 | 1994 |
|---|---|---|---|
| Canada East | | 2nd | 2nd |
| Canada West | | 1st | 3rd |
| Finland | 7th | 3rd | 1st |
| United States | 8th | 4th | 4th |
| Sweden | | 6th | 6th |
| Russia | | 5th | 5th |
| (Canada) Alberta | 1st | | |
| (Canada) Saskatchewan | 6th | | |
| (Canada) Manitoba | 5th | | |
| (Canada) Ontario | 2nd | | |
| (Canada) Quebec | 3rd | | |
| (Canada) Gloucester, Ontario | 4th | | |

The 1996 World Ringette Championships marked the first time the event had only one representative team from each participating nation.

Seniors: 1996–2019
| Team | 1996 | 2000 | 2002 | 2004 | 2007 | 2010 | 2013 | 2016 | 2017 | 2019 |
|---|---|---|---|---|---|---|---|---|---|---|
| Canada | 1st | 2nd | 1st | 2nd | 2nd | 2nd | 2nd | 2nd | 2nd | 2nd |
| Finland | 2nd | 1st | 2nd | 1st | 1st | 1st | 1st | 1st | 1st | 1st |
| United States | 3rd | 3rd | 3rd | 3rd | 4th | 3rd | 3rd | 4th | | |
| Sweden | 4th | 4th | 4th | 4th | 3rd | 4th | 4th | 3rd | | |
| Czech Republic | | | | | | | | 5th | | |
| Slovakia | | | | | | | | 6th | | |

Seniors: 2021–Present
| Team | 2021 | 2022 |
|---|---|---|
| Canada | COVID-19 | 2nd |
| Finland | COVID-19 | 1st |

=== Junior ===
Juniors (U19/U21): 2009–2019
| Team | 2009 | 2012 | 2013 | 2016 | 2017 | 2019 |
|---|---|---|---|---|---|---|
| Canada U19/U21 | | | 2nd | 1st | 1st | 1st |
| Finland U19/U21 | | 2nd | 1st | 2nd | 2nd | 2nd |
| United States | | 5th | | | | |
| Sweden Senior | | | | 3rd | | |
| Sweden U19 | | | | 5th | | |
| Canada East | 2nd | 1st | | | | |
| Canada West | 4th | 3rd | | | | |
| Finland White Stars | 1st | | | | | |
| Finland Blue Stars | 3rd | | | | | |
| Russia | | 4th | | | | |
| France | | 6th | | | | |

Juniors (U19/U21): 2021–present
| Team | 2021 | 2022 | 2023 |
|---|---|---|---|
| Canada U21 | COVID-19 | 2nd | 2nd |
| Finland U21 | COVID-19 | 1st | 1st |

=== President's ===
President's: 2013–2019
| Team | 2013 | 2017 | 2019 |
|---|---|---|---|
| United States | | 2nd | 2nd |
| Sweden | | 1st | 1st |
| (Slovakia) Russia | | | |
| Czech Republic | | 3rd | 3rd |
| Finland Junior | 1st | | |

President's: 2021–present
| Team | 2021 | 2022 |
|---|---|---|
| United States | COVID-19 | 1st |
| Sweden | COVID-19 | 2nd |
| Czech Republic | COVID-19 | 3rd |
| Slovakia | COVID-19 | |

== Events by year ==
=== 1990 World Ringette Championships ===
The 1990 World Ringette Championship (WRC) was the first World Ringette Championship and was held in the Canadian city of Gloucester, Ontario. Three countries participated: Canada, Finland and United States. The international competition involved a total of 8 competing teams. Finland finished seventh and the United States eighth while Canadian teams monopolized the podium. Team Alberta, which consisted of ringette players from the province's "Calgary Debs", won the first world ringette title in international competition and the WRC's new Sam Jacks Trophy after defeating Team Ontario 6 – 5 in the final.

=== 1992 World Ringette Championships ===
The 1992 World Ringette Championship was the second World Ringette Championship and took place in Helsinki, Finland, from March 4 to 8, 1992. This event marked the 2nd World Ringette Championships. There were two Canadian teams, Canada East and Canada West, and representative teams from Finland, United States, France, Sweden and Russia. Canada West (Team Alberta "AAA") won gold. Twelve members of Team Alberta were members of the Calgary Deb AA team.

=== 1994 World Ringette Championships ===
The 1994 World Ringette Championship was the third World Ringette Championship and was played in the city of Saint Paul, Minnesota, in the United States. This event marked the 3rd World Ringette Championships. As in the previous World Championship, there were two teams representing Canada, and representative teams from Finland, the United States, Sweden and Russia. Finland won the World Cup, its very first world championship. This would turn out to be the last time Russia would send a senior national team to the international competition.

=== 1996 World Ringette Championships ===
The 1996 World Ringette Championship was the fourth World Ringette Championship and took place in Stockholm, Sweden, from April 15 to 20, 1996. This event marked the 4th World Ringette Championships. Team Canada won the gold medal beating Team Finland 6–5 in extra time. It was the first time all teams represented individual nations. Canada took home the Sam Jacks Trophy, the first year the updated design of the trophy was awarded.

=== 1998 World Ringette Championships ===
==== 1998 Summit Series ====
While the 1998 World Ringette Championship was initially meant to be held in Moncton, New Brunswick, Canada, the event did not take place. Instead a promotional five game ringette "Summit Series" tour of Europe was organized with a series of games between a national team from Canada, and a national team from Finland from between February 27 to March 7, 1998. Both teams made stops in four different countries and cities: Turku (Finland), Gothenburg (Sweden), Osnabruck (Germany), and Colmar (France). The fifth and final game took place in Colmar, France, where Team Finland beat Team Canada 10–8. Finland won the Summit Series against Canada 3–2.

=== 2000 World Ringette Championships ===
The 2000 World Ringette Championships followed the 1998 Summit Series and preceded the 2002 World Ringette Championships. It was an international ringette tournament which was contested in Espoo and Lahti in Finland, from November 15–18, 2000. This event marked the 5th World Ringette Championships. Team Finland and Team Canada first met in the two-game world championship final on November 15 in Lahti, and then again on November 18 in Espoo. Finland won the first game 5–4. The Finnish national team then secured the World Ringette Championship title in the second game by playing a 5–5 tie game. Finland became the world champion with a total of 3-1 points. In the bronze medal match, the USA defeated Sweden 9–0.

=== 2002 World Ringette Championships ===
The 2002 World Ringette Championship was contested in Edmonton, Alberta from November 25–30, 2002 at the Northlands AgriCom Arena, now called the Edmonton Expo Centre. This event marked the 6th World Ringette Championships. Alberta Sports Hall of Fame inductee, Phyllis Sadoway, was the assistant coach of Team Canada in 2002. The victory by Team Canada in 2002 was considered particularly notable. After having been defeated by a score of 4–3 in extra time against Finland in 2000, Canada took its revenge by defeating their arch-rival by a score of 3–1 in front of a sell-out crowd of 3850 supporters. The final match was broadcast in Canada by the Canadian Broadcasting Corporation (CBC) and followed by 144,000 Canadian televiewers. It is the last time Team Canada has won the Sam Jacks Trophy to date.

=== 2004 World Ringette Championships ===
The 2004 World Ringette Championship was the seventh world championship and was contested in Stockholm, Sweden from November 23 to 27, 2004. This event marked the 7th World Ringette Championships. The game for the world title final between Canada and Finland took place at the Visättra SportCenter in Huddinge, Stockholm, Sweden. Finland took the world championship by crushing Canada 9–3 in the final. Since the 2004 World Championships, Finland has dominated the international senior level of ringette. Anna Vanhatalo was elected the best goaltender of the tournament.

=== 2007 World Ringette Championships ===
The 2007 World Ringette Championship was contested in Ottawa, Canada, between October 30 and November 3, 2007. This event marked the 8th World Ringette Championships. The competition took place at the Ottawa Civic Centre which has since been renamed, "TD Place Arena" and was broadcast in Canada by Rogers TV. The final game between Canada and Finland required an added period of overtime. Finnish player Marjukka Virta tied the game 4–4. Finnish player Anne Pohjola scored the winning overtime goal ending the game 5–4. Finland won the world championship series. It was the first time that Finland beat Canada in a World Ringette Championship final hosted in Canada and was the first time Team Sweden won a World Ringette Championship medal (bronze) by beating the United States 10–9 in overtime.

=== 2010 World Ringette Championships ===
The 2010 World Ringette Championships was contested in Tampere, Finland between November 1 and November 6, 2010. This event marked the 9th World Ringette Championships. Finland won its fifth world title in front of 10,000 spectators and televiewers, beating Team Canada again. The United States had their revenge on Sweden defeating them 19–1.

=== 2013 World Ringette Championships ===
The 2013 World Ringette Championship marked the 50th anniversary of the sport and took place in North Bay, Ontario, Canada between December 31, 2013, and January 4, 2014. This event marked the 10th World Ringette Championships. It was the first time the World Junior Ringette Championships, known as the U19 World Ringette Championship, was added to the program. Some of the games were live-streamed online and made available for public viewing. The United States won the bronze. Finland U19 won the President's Trophy and Finland won the Junior U19 World Championship title.

=== 2016 World Ringette Championships ===
The 2016 World Ringette Championships was contested in Helsinki, Finland between December 27, 2015 – January 3, 2016. This event marked the 11th World Ringette Championships. This was the first time Slovakia and the Czech Republic appeared at the international tournament. 18 of the games were live-streamed online and made available for public viewing. The event marked the 11th international competition of the sport of ringette. In addition to the international competition, a tournament, known as the "Ringette Festival", was held for U14 teams.

=== 2017 World Ringette Championships ===
The 2017 World Ringette Championship was contested in Mississauga, Ontario from November 27 to December 3, 2017, at the Hershey Centre Arena now renamed the Paramount Fine Foods Centre. This event marked the 12th World Ringette Championships. Eight of the games were live-streamed online and made available for public viewing.

=== 2019 World Ringette Championships ===
The 2019 World Ringette Championships were hosted in Burnaby, British Columbia, Canada. Main competition took place at the Bill Copeland Sports Centre. This event marked the 13th World Ringette Championships. The games were recorded and live streamed by Sports Canada TV and have since been made available for public viewing on the video sharing site, YouTube, by Ringette Canada. 15 of the games were live-streamed online and made available for public viewing.

=== 2021 World Ringette Championships ===
The 2021 World Ringette Championships were cancelled due to the COVID-19 pandemic. The event was meant to be hosted by Finland in Helsinki following the 2019 World Ringette Championships and was meant to be the 14th World Ringette Championships. The 14th WRC was rescheduled for the 2022 World Ringette Championships instead.

=== 2022 World Ringette Championships ===
The 2022 World Ringette Championships took place in Espoo, Finland, at the Espoo Metro Areena, October 31-November 6, 2022. The event marked the 14th (XIV) World Ringette Championships. A youth tournament was played at the Espoo Tapiola Arena and Matinkylä ice rinks.

=== 2023 World Ringette Championships ===
The 2023 World Ringette Championships took place in Calgary, Canada, at RTK Arena, October 31 – November 4, 2023. The event marked the 15th (XV) World Ringette Championships and the 60th anniversary of the sport of ringette which was created in 1963.

=== 2025 World Ringette Championships ===
The 2025 World Ringette Championships took place in Lahti, Finland, at RTK Arena and Wemasto Arena, November 3–9, 2025. The event marked the 16th (XVI) World Ringette Championships.

Five countries and seven teams participated, competing in three different series; Sam Jacks, Juuso Wahlsten and President's Pool. In addition, an international U18 development camp was organized in Pajulahti from November 1 to 8, 2025.

== World Junior Ringette Championships ==
The World Junior Ringette Championships (WJRC), alternatively known as the "U19 World Ringette Championship", was an international ringette tournament organized by the International Ringette Federation (IRF) in 2009 and 2012 for elite international junior ringette athletes. It was run as a separate tournament from the World Ringette Championships, an international ringette tournament which was initially restricted to elite senior ringette athletes. The World Junior Ringette Championships no longer functions as an event, having since merged in 2013 with the main World Ringette Championships program where both Senior and Junior divisions now exist.

The 2009 World Junior Ringette Championships were hosted in the city of Prague in the Czech Republic while the 2012 World Junior Ringette Championships were hosted in London, Ontario, Canada. Competing nations included Team Canada Junior, Team Finland Junior, Team USA junior, Team France Junior, and Team Russia Junior, though only the Canadians and Finns competed in the first tournament in WJRC 2009.

During the 2013 World Ringette Championships the U19 World Ringette Championship became known as the "Junior Pool" competition where the winning team is now awarded the Juuso Wahlsten Trophy, first introduced in 2019.

=== 2009 World Junior Ringette Championships ===
The first World Junior Ringette Championships took place in August, 2009 in Prague, Czech Republic. Two Canadian teams, Canada West Under-19 and Canada-East Under-19 faced two Finnish teams, the Finland White Stars and the Finland Blue Stars. Canada East suffered a heartbreaking loss to the Finland White Stars at the gold medal final.

=== 2012 World Junior Ringette Championships ===
The 2012 World Junior Ringette Championships was the second World Junior Ringette Championships and was held in December, 2012 in London, Ontario, Canada. This was the last year the event was held separately from the World Ringette Championships after which a new U19 division was created. It was also the first and last time France and Russia would send national teams to compete at the international level with neither country having sent a national team to compete in either the senior or junior level since.

== Ringette World Club Championship ==
The Ringette World Club Championship was an international ringette competition organized by the International Ringette Federation featuring the top teams of the Canadian National Ringette League (NRL), the Finnish Ringeten SM-Sarja and Swedish Ringette Dam-SM. Held in 2008 and 2011, the planned 2014 event was cancelled and the tournament was discontinued because of financial difficulties facing the competing teams.

== Canada vs Finland world title rivalry ==
Since the early establishment of the international competition, Team Canada and Team Finland have battled for the world title. Both countries have since emerged as the sport's major international rivals at both the senior and junior levels. Initially only one international competition existed and was contested between national ringette teams for adults. Today both a senior and junior age group exists. Historically, Finland's senior national ringette team has dominated the competition. Canada's junior ringette team now records the most victories in the newer junior age level which has consisted of teams with players in either U19 (under 19) or U21 (under 21).

The two countries developed their ringette system on different continents which has resulted in two different playing styles.

[Keely] Brown said the sport has a massive community in the Scandinavian country.

"When you go over to Finland, ringette is just a totally different national sport over there...The stands are full, and it's very loud, and there's smoke and fireworks, and it's broadcast nationally on TV, and the players there have been playing for quite some time together and have a different style of play."

— Steve Seto, "'A really amazing experience': Sask. ringette player returns from tournament in Finland", Saskatoon / 650 CKOM (November 18, 2022)

Cultural differences in sport have emerged as well as observed by one Calgary based player:

"As compared to ringette in Canada, the league over there is a big deal...When they broadcast the games, 160,000 people in Finland watch...The arenas are packed." The finals rival the productions of professional sports in Canada she says. "It is really incredible...Some small towns have teams and that's what you do. That is their Saturday night. You go there and there is a huge crowd."

— P. Youldon, "Can you spell "Finland?"", The Youldon Group (January 28, 2012)

=== Senior ===
The senior competition exhibits the highest level of elite ringette competition internationally. Team Canada and Team Finland typically compete in a best-of-three-game series known as the "Sam Jacks Series" with the winning nation awarded the Sam Jacks Trophy, though in 2022 a two-game series format was used instead. The senior competition was postponed for the 2023 World Ringette Championships until the 2025 World Ringette Championships.

Team Finland (senior) has competed at every World Ringette Championship since its beginning in 1990. To date Finland is the most successful ringette playing nation worldwide winning its first world title victory in 1996, the first year all nations had individual representation.

Team Canada (senior) has competed at every World Ringette Championship since its beginning in 1990. Canada won its first world title victory in 1996, the first year all nations had individual representation.

==== World Titles (Senior) ====
- The newly redesigned Sam Jacks Trophy was introduced in 1996.
- *Asterisk marks period before all competing nations had one national representative team.

| Gold | | | | Gold | | | |
|---|---|---|---|---|---|---|---|
| Senior Team Finland | | | | Senior Team Canada | | | |
| Year | *1994 | Location | (United States) Saint Paul | Year | *1990 | Location | (Canada) Gloucester |
| Year | 2000 | Location | (Finland) Espoo and Lahti | Year | *1992 | Location | (Finland) Helsinki |
| Year | 2004 | Location | (Sweden) Stockholm | Year | 1996 | Location | (Sweden) Stockholm |
| Year | 2007 | Location | (Canada) Ottawa | Year | 2002 | Location | (Canada) Edmonton |
| Year | 2010 | Location | (Finland) Tampere | | | | |
| Year | 2013 | Location | (Canada) North Bay | | | | |
| Year | 2016 | Location | (Finland) Helsinki | | | | |
| Year | 2017 | Location | (Canada) Mississauga | | | | |
| Year | 2019 | Location | (Canada) Burnaby | | | | |
| Year | 2022 | Location | (Finland) Espoo | | | | |

=== Junior ===
The junior competition exhibits the elite ringette competition internationally for the junior age group. The junior competition uses either the Under-19 age group (U19) or Under-21 age group (U21). Like the senior event, the junior competition typically takes place in a best-of-three-game series between international ringette arch-rivals, Canada and Finland, though in 2022 a two-game series format was used instead. The winning nation is awarded the Juuso Wahlsten Trophy.

In the junior competition, Team Canada (junior) has recorded the most victories to date. However it wasn't until 2013 that the competition had nations with one team exclusively representing their respective countries and the best-of-three series between junior teams from Canada and Finland began.

The first official world junior ringette competition began in 2009. The junior tournament was initially held separately from its senior counterpart but the junior tournament ceased after 2012 and merged with the senior competition in 2013 becoming a part of the larger World Ringette Championship program.

==== World Titles (Junior) ====
- The Juuso Wahlsten Trophy was introduced in 2019

| Gold | | | | Gold | | | |
|---|---|---|---|---|---|---|---|
| Junior Team Canada | | | | Junior Team Finland | | | |
| Year | 2012 | Location | (Canada) London, Ontario | Year | 2009 | Location | (Czech Republic) Prague |
| Year | 2013 | Location | (Canada) North Bay, Ontario | Year | 2022 | Location | (Finland) Espoo |
| Year | 2016 | Location | (Finland) Helsinki | Year | 2023 | Location | (Canada) Calgary |
| Year | 2017 | Location | (Canada) Mississauga, Ontario | | | | |
| Year | 2019 | Location | (Canada) Burnaby | | | | |

== Czech Republic national ringette team ==
Czech Republic
- Nickname: Team Czech
- Association: Czech Ringette Association (Czech: Česky Svaz Ringetu)
- Team colors
| Home colours | Away colours |

First international
- Czech Republic (Sr.) 2016 (Helsinki, Finland; 2016)

World Ringette Championships
- Appearances: 4 (first in 2016)
- Best result: (bronze) President's: 3rd; 2017, 2019, 2022

Medal record

World Ringette Championships

Seniors
| | 2016 Helsinki | Team |
| Bronze medal – third place | President's Pool; 2017 Mississauga | Team |
| Bronze medal – third place | President's Pool; 2019 Burnaby | Team |
| | 2021 Helsinki | Cancelled |
| Bronze medal – third place | President's Pool; 2022 Espoo | Team |

The Czech Republic national ringette team, (Czech: Česky Svaz Ringetu), more commonly known as "Team Czech", is the ringette team representing Czech Republic internationally. The country has a senior national team but does not have a junior national representative. The Czech senior national team competes in the World Ringette Championships (WRC) in the President's Pool against Team USA and Team Sweden, and is overseen by the Czech Ringette Association, (Czech: Česky Svas Ringetu) which is a member of the International Ringette Federation (IRF).

The Czech Republic's first appearance in international ringette took place at the World Ringette Championships in 2016 with the national team (Seniors) competing in both the Senior Pool and the Junior pool. Veronika Hulková, a goaltender, is considered to be one of the most influential members of the national team to date.

While the national team consists of native players from the Czech Republic, Canadians have also been allowed to compete for the Czech team provided they have an EU passport and European ties.

(Seniors) World Ringette Championships
| Year | Location | Result |
|---|---|---|
| 2016 | (Finland) Helsinki | Senior Pool; 5th Junior Pool; 7th |
| 2017 | (Canada) Mississauga | President's; Bronze |
| 2019 | (Canada) Burnaby | President's; Bronze |
| 2021 | (Finland) Helsinki | cancelled |
| 2022 | (Finland) Espoo | President's; Bronze |

== Online broadcasts ==
Due to improvements in digital technology, broadcasts from the World Ringette Championships began to be uploaded and livestreamed to the web for online viewing by various organizations and individuals.

=== WRC 2010 – 2022 ===
The first webcast via the internet was made for the 2013 World Ringette Championships. The highlight event, the "Sam Jacks Series" is the Senior Pool, which is typically a three-game series between Team Canada Senior and Team Finland Senior. The second feature event is the Junior Pool, which is typically a three-game series between Team Canada Junior and Team Finland Junior, though both teams also initially also competed in the President's Pool. Historically, Team Finland has dominated the Senior Pool while Team Canada has dominated the Junior Pool.

SENIORS

SENIOR POOL (Sam Jacks Series) Canada Senior vs Finland Senior
| Year | Game 1 | Game 2 | Game 3 | World Title |
|---|---|---|---|---|
| WRC 2023 | | | | |
| WRC 2022 | (Canada) CAN vs (Finland) FIN YouTube; 2022 Sam Jacks Series; Game 1 Yle; Friday November 4, 2022; Game 1: 1st & 2nd Period Game 1: Game compilation 1–4 Periods | (Canada) CAN vs (Finland) FIN YouTube; 2022 Sam Jacks Series; Game 2 Yle; Sunday November 6, 2022; Game 2: Final | Not contested in 2022 | Finland |
| WRC 2019 | (Canada) CAN vs (Finland) FIN 2019 Sam Jacks Series; Game 1 | (Canada) CAN vs (Finland) FIN 2019 Sam Jacks Series; Game 2 | NO GAME | Finland |
| WRC 2017 | (Canada) CAN vs (Finland) FIN 2017 Sam Jacks Series; Game 1 | (Canada) CAN vs (Finland) FIN 2017 Sam Jacks Series; Game 2 | NO GAME | Finland |
| WRC 2016 | (Canada) CAN vs (Finland) FIN 2016 Sam Jacks Series; Game 1 | (Canada) CAN vs (Finland) FIN 2016 Sam Jacks Series; Game 2 | NO GAME | Finland |
| WRC 2013 | (Canada) CAN vs (Finland) FIN 2013 Sam Jacks Series; Game 1 | (Canada) CAN vs (Finland) FIN 2013 Sam Jacks Series; Game 2 | NO GAME | Finland |

JUNIORS

JUNIOR POOL and PRESIDENT'S POOL (U19, U20, U21) Canada Junior vs Finland Junior
| Year | Game 1 | Game 2 | Game 3 | World Title |
|---|---|---|---|---|
| WRC 2023 | | | | |
| WRC 2022 | (Canada) CAN Jr. vs (Finland) FIN Jr. YouTube; 2022 Junior Pool; Game 1 | (Canada) CAN Jr. vs (Finland) FIN Jr. YouTube; 2022 Junior Pool; Game 2 Yle; Game 2: Final | Not contested in 2022 | Finland |
| WRC 2019 | (Canada) CAN vs (Finland) FIN 2019 Junior Pool; Game 1 | (Canada) CAN vs (Finland) FIN 2019 Junior Pool; Game 2 | NO GAME | Canada |
| WRC 2017 | (Canada) CAN vs (Finland) FIN 2017 Junior Pool; Game 1 | (Canada) CAN vs (Finland) FIN 2017 Junior Pool; Game 2 | NO GAME | Canada |
| WRC 2016 | (Canada) CAN vs (Finland) FIN 2016 President's Pool; Game 1 | (Canada) CAN vs (Finland) FIN 2016 President's Pool; Game 2 | NO GAME | Canada |
| WRC 2013 | (Canada) CAN vs (Finland) FIN 2013 Junior Pool; Game 1 | (Canada) CAN vs (Finland) FIN 2013 Junior Pool; Game 2 | NO GAME | Finland |

== Hosts ==
The first World Ringette Championship took place in Gloucester, Ontario, Canada in 1990. The 1998 World Ringette Championship was initially meant to be held in Moncton, New Brunswick, Canada, but instead, a promotional 5 game ringette "Summit Series" tour of Europe was organized with competitions between teams from Canada and Finland.

The World Junior Ringette Championships and the Ringette World Club Championship were both initially organized by the International Ringette Federation separately from the World Ringette Championship. The international club competition has ceased to exist since the last event in 2011; the World Junior event is now a part of the World Ringette Championship itself in a division called "U19".

Canada (9)

- 1990: Ontario,
  Gloucester
- 2002: Alberta,
  Edmonton
- 2007: Ontario,
  Ottawa
- 2008: Ontario,
  Sault Ste. Marie,
  (World Club)
- 2012: Ontario,
  London
  (World Juniors, U19)
- 2013: Ontario,
  North Bay
- 2017: Ontario,
  Mississauga
- 2019: British Columbia,
  Burnaby
- 2019: Alberta,
  Calgary

Finland (6)

- 1992: Helsinki
- 2000: Espoo & Lahti
- 2010: Tampere
- 2016: Helsinki
- 2011: Turku
  (World Club)
- 2022: Espoo

Sweden (2)

- 1996: Stockholm
- 2004: Stockholm

(United States) USA (1)

- 1994: Saint Paul,
  Minnesota

Czech Republic (1)

- 2009: Prague,
  (World Juniors, U19)

== Medals table ==
The first World Ringette Championships to have full Senior national teams exclusively was in 1996. The first World Ringette Championships to have full Junior national teams exclusively was in 2013.

Seniors (post 1996) and Juniors (post 2013)
| Rank | Nation | Gold | Silver | Bronze | Total |
|---|---|---|---|---|---|
| 1 | Finland | 8 | 6 | 1 | 15 |
| 2 | Canada | 5 | 10 | 0 | 15 |
| Totals (2 entries) | | 13 | 16 | 1 | 30 |

President's Pool
| Rank | Nation | Gold | Silver | Bronze | Total |
|---|---|---|---|---|---|
| 1 | Sweden | 2 | 0 | 3 | 5 |
| 2 | United States | 0 | 2 | 6 | 8 |
| 3 | Czech Republic | 0 | 0 | 2 | 2 |
| 4 | Slovakia | 0 | 0 | 0 | 0 |
| Totals (4 entries) | | 2 | 2 | 11 | 15 |

Teams in italics no longer compete at the World Championships as of 2021.

Teams no longer in competition:
| Rank | Nation | Gold | Silver | Bronze | Total |
|---|---|---|---|---|---|
| 1 | Canada East 1992 1994 2009 U19 2012 U19 | 1 | 3 | 0 | 4 |
| 2 | Canada West 1992 1994 2009 U19 2012 U19 | 1 | 1 | 2 | 4 |
| 3 | Finland White Stars | 1 | 0 | 0 | 1 |
| 3 | Team Alberta | 1 | 0 | 0 | 1 |
| 5 | Team Ontario | 0 | 1 | 0 | 1 |
| 6 | Finland Blue Stars | 0 | 0 | 1 | 1 |
| 6 | Team Quebec | 0 | 0 | 1 | 1 |
| 8 | France | 0 | 0 | 0 | 0 |
| 8 | Russia | 0 | 0 | 0 | 0 |
| Totals (9 entries) | | 4 | 5 | 4 | 13 |

== See also ==
- Ringette
- International Ringette Federation
  - Canada national ringette team
  - Finland national ringette team
  - United States national ringette team
  - Sweden national ringette team
- Sam Jacks
- Red McCarthy
- Juhani Wahlsten
- Ringette World Club Championship

== Sources ==
- International Ringette Federation Official Homepage
- Dead link (no archive) : International Ringette Federation Official Homepage
