= Juhani Wahlsten =

Finnish ice hockey player and coach (1938–2019)

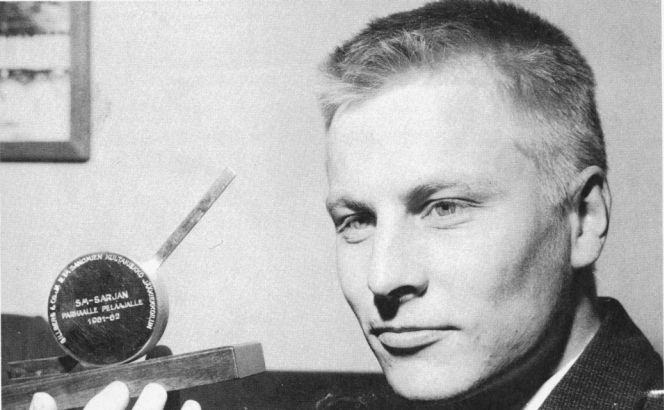
- Wahlsten in 1962
- Born: 13 January 1938 Helsinki, Finland
- Died: 9 August 2019 (aged 81) Turku, Finland
- Height: 5 ft 9 in (175 cm)
- Weight: 176 lb (80 kg; 12 st 8 lb)
- Position: Forward
- Shot: Left
- Played for: KalPa; Ilves; HJK; TPS; EC KAC
- National team: Finland
- Playing career: 1956–1970
Medal record
Representing Finland
Ice hockey

Juhani Jorma Kalervo Wahlsten (13 January 1938 – 9 June 2019) was a Finnish professional ice hockey player and ice hockey coach who worked as an exercise and gymnastics teacher in Finland. He was also known by the nickname "Juuso". He also established and helped guide the early development of ringette in Finland, the first European country to do so.

During his ice hockey career, Wahlsten played in Finland's SM-sarja for a number of teams including KalPa, Ilves, HJK Helsinki, and TPS. After his playing career finished he went on to become a coach. Wahlsten was inducted into the Finnish Hockey Hall of Fame in 1986 and was later inducted into the IIHF Hall of Fame in 2006.

Wahlsten is considered to be the "Father of Ringette" in Finland. The Juuso Wahlsten Trophy, named in his honour, is awarded during the World Ringette Championships to the World Ringette Junior champions.

== Early life ==
Juhani Jorma Kalervo Wahlsten was born on 13 January 1938, in Helsinki, Finland.

== Playing career ==
Wahlsten played for both the Finland men's national ice hockey team and in the Finnish professional ice hockey league, SM-sarja.

=== Professional ice hockey player ===
Wahlsten began his career at KuPS (Kuopion Palloseura) in Kuopio in 1957, from where he moved to KalPa. Wahlsten helped raise the team to the main league level for the first time. While playing, he formed the "Hurricane Line" together with Ossi Hyppönen and Mauno Revo. Later, Revo was replaced by second-line center forward, Lauri Helen, and Revo moved to Helen's second-place position. Wahlsten's line-mate, Hyppönen, also won the Finnish Championship gold in 1960.

In 1959, Wahlsten moved to Tampere's Ilves, where he won the Finnish championship. After two years with Ilves, Wahlsten moved on for one season to HJK Helsinki, then to the Turku Club. In Turku, Wahlsten became one of Finland's first star players.

After seven TPS seasons, Wahlsten followed in the footsteps of Reijo Hakanen to EC KAC in Austria, where he won the national championship. After the season, Wahlsten returned to Ilves where he played for the final year before retiring.

In 1960 at the age of 22, Wahlsten won the SM-sarja gold while playing for Ilves Tampere. In 1967 at the age of 29, Wahlsten won the SM-sarja silver while playing for TPS Turku.

From 1957 to 1971, Wahlsten scored 219 points and 139 goals in 200 games.

=== Finland national ice hockey team ===
Wahlsten played 115 games for the Finland men's national ice hockey team.

Wahlsten played in the Ice Hockey World Championships in 1959, 1962, 1965, 1967, and 1969.

In 1962 Wahlsten won silver at the Ice Hockey European Championships while playing for Finland's national team.

Wahlsten also played for the Finland national team in the Winter Olympics in 1960, 1964, and 1968. When Wahlsten was the captain of the Finnish national hockey team in 1967 he scored two goals when Finland defeated the ice hockey powerhouse, Czechoslovakia, for the first time.

== Coaching career ==
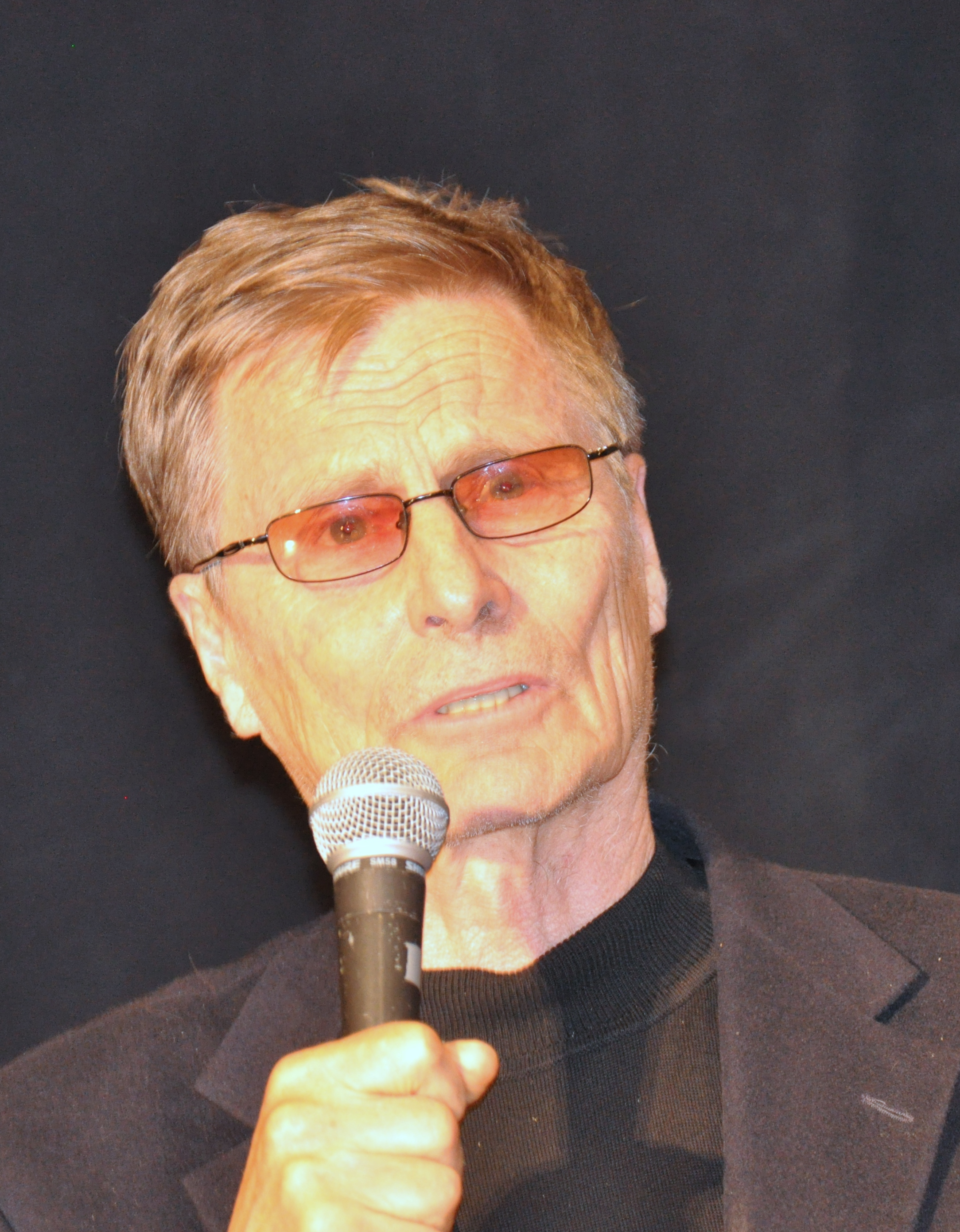
Wahlsten in 2011

After his career as professional ice hockey player finished in 1971, Wahlsten continued as a coach. Wahlsten coached for a professional ice hockey league in Finland, for junior amateur ice hockey, and for Finland's junior men's national team.

=== HC TPS ===
Wahlsten coached HC TPS from 1971 to 1972.

After he had moved on to coach FC Barcelona Ice Hockey in Spain, Wahlsten returned to TPS in Finland to coach from 1980 to 1983. HC TPS was first in the Finnish Championships 1971–72, and then in the Finnish Ice Hockey Championships 1980–1983.

In the early 1980s, TPS had a strong team but was unable to reach gold. After Wahlsten came aboard, the team made it to the semi-finals and finished in first place during the three seasons when Wahlsten was coach.

At least six players born in the early 1960s from TPS's Lokit junior team in Turku who were coached by Wahlsten were drafted by the National Hockey League in the 1980s, specifically to the Buffalo Sabres (coached by Scotty Bowman) and its Rochester farm team: Hannu Virta, Kai Suikkanen, Mauri Eivola, Heikki Leime, Jari Paavola, and others.

=== FC Barcelona Ice Hockey ===
From 1972 to 1974, Wahlsten was the coach for FC Barcelona Ice Hockey in Spain, the ice hockey division of the well-known football team, FC Barcelona.

=== EV Füssen ===
From 1984 to 1985, Wahlsten was the Head coach for the EV Füssen juniors in Germany.

=== Finland men's national junior ice hockey team ===
In 1983, Wahlsten was head coach of the Finland men's national junior ice hockey team (U20).

=== HC Davos ===
From 1987 to 1988, Wahlsten coached HC Davos in Switzerland.

== Ringette ==
Wahlsten, a.k.a. "Juuso" Wahlsten, is known as the "Father of Ringette" in Finland.

In 1979, Wahlsten introduced the Canadian sport of ringette to Finland by inviting two Canadian ringette coaches, Wendy King and Evelyn Watson, from Dollard des Ormeaux (a suburb of Montreal Quebec, Canada) to teach girls of various ages how to play ringette in Finland. Wahlsten first introduced ringette to female players during hockey practice in Turku, then began creating some ringette teams in the area. The first recorded ringette game in Finland took place on January 23, 1979. It was the first time ringette had been played in Europe. Finland's first ringette club was Ringetteläisiä Turun Siniset and the country's first ringette tournament took place in December, 1980.

Today, the World Ringette Championships (WRC) presents the Juuso Wahlsten Trophy, named in his honour, to the winning junior world champion ringette team. The trophy was first introduced at the international competition during the 2019 World Ringette Championships. The Team Canada Juniors became the first national team to win the trophy.

== Personal life ==
Wahlsten worked as an exercise and gymnastics teacher at Aurajoki Co-educational School, where his wife Leena taught gymnastics to girls. Wahlsten's sons Jali and Sami have also been representative level ice hockey players.

Wahlsten died on 9 June 2019, in Turku, Finland.

== Achievements and awards ==
- Called "The Father of Ringette" in Finland after helping introduce the Canadian sport to Finland in 1979
- Inducted into the Finnish Hockey Hall of Fame in 1986 as number 43
- Player member of the IIHF Hall of Fame (inducted 2006)
- HC TPS (a.k.a. TPS or Turun Palloseura) has frozen Wahlsten's game number 8
- Made 219 points and 139 goals in 200 games during his playing career
- 1 Finnish Championship gold as a player (in 1960)
- 1 Finnish Championship silver (SM-silver) as a player
- 1 Austrian Championship gold as a player (1970)
- Selection for the SM Stars All Stars team (in 1967)
- Finnish Hockey Lion, number 43
- 5 Ice Hockey World Championships tournaments: 1959, 1962, 1965, 1967, and 1969
- 3 Olympic Games: 1960, 1964, and 1968
- 115 Finnish national team Games
- Ice Hockey European Championships silver 1962
- KalPa 1956-59
- Ilves 1959-61 and 1970-71
- HJK 1961-62
- TPS 1962-69
- AC Klagenfurt Austria 1969-70
- 1 SM-sarja silver and 1 bronze as a coach
- Head coach of the Finland men's national junior ice hockey team in 1983
- Coach for TPS 1971–72, 1980-83
- Coach for FC Barcelona 1972-74
- Head coach for EV Füssen juniors 1984-85
