= Petra Ojaranta =

Retired elite Finnish ringette player, current Finnish ringette coach

Personal information
- Nationality: Finland
- Born: 17 August 1976 (age 49) Turku (Finland)

Sport
- Country: Finland; Canada; World
- Position: Forward
- Shoots: Right
- Team: - Team Finland Sr.; - (Finland) 1985–1994 Turun Ringette, SM Ringette; - 1994–1996 VG-62, SM Ringette; - 1996–1999 Turun Ringette, SM Ringette; - 1999–2000 Espoon Kiekkoseura EKS, SM Ringette; - (Canada) 2001–2002 Edmonton Ringette Club; - 2002–2005 Turun Ringette, SM Ringette; - 2005–2017 RNK Flyers, SM Ringette; - (Canada) 2017–2020 BC Thunder, NRL; - 2020 – RNK Flyers, SM Ringette
Medal record
Event	1st	2nd	3rd
WRC	6	2	0
RWCC	0	1	0
CRC	0	1	0
SMRC (Nationals)	2	?	?
Total	8	4	0
Ringette
World Ringette Championships
Representing Finland
Gold medal – first place	1994 USA	
Silver medal – second place	1996 Sweden	
Gold medal – first place	1998 EuroTour	
Gold medal – first place	2000 Finland	
Silver medal – second place	2002 Canada	
Gold medal – first place	2004 Sweden	
Gold medal – first place	2007 Canada	
Gold medal – first place	2010 Finland	
SM Ringette Championships (Nationals)
Gold medal – first place	9	
- Updated on August 28, 2023

Petra Ojaranta (born March 17, 1976, Turku) is a Finnish ringette player. She is one of Finland's most successful ringette players of all time and has been involved in winning six World Ringette Championships, including the 1998 EuroTour, playing for the Finland national ringette team.

Ojaranta also competed in two national ringette leagues, SM Ringette in Finland and the National Ringette League in Canada, as well as the Ringette World Club Championship and Canadian Ringette Championships.

== Career ==
Petra Ojaranta developed a passion for ringette at the age of 9. She started playing for the Turku club and during her career represented the South West Finland region with various clubs including Turku, VG-62 and (EKS).

=== World Ringette Championships ===
Ojaranta competed in the World Ringette Championships eight times. She eventually became the oldest player of the Finland national team since she had been selected since 1994 and accumulated numerous international medals.

=== Finland ===
==== National ====
At the national level she reached 4 Finnish professional elite league championships, and won three silver medals and a bronze. She was selected on the All Stars team in 2000-2001 and 2002–2003.

==== SM Ringette ====
Ojaranta is sixth after the 2021–2022 season in the all-time point statistics of the SM Ringette league. She played 680 games and scored power points in them: 725 + 1103 = 1828.

Since 2005, she has been playing for the RNK Flyers, where in addition she takes care of training the junior teams affiliated to the club. In 2010–11, she helped her team win the national SM Ringette championship.

=== Canada ===
==== Canadian Ringette Championships ====
Ojaranta also has experience in Canada, where she played in the 2001–02 season, in Edmonton. Her Alberta team placed second at the Canadian Ringette Championships. At that time, the Canadian championship was strictly amateur and the National Ringette League did not exist.

==== National Ringette League ====
In addition to Finland, Ojaranta has played in Canada's National Ringette League in the ranks of the Edmonton Ringette Club, and in the BC Thunder team in Vancouver.

== Statistics ==
=== International ===
Statistics per competition
Year	Event	GP	G	A	Pts	+/-	PIM	Results
1994	World Ringette Championships							(gold) Gold
1996	World Ringette Championships	6	8	4	12	-	-	(silver) Silver
1998	World Ringette Championships (EuroTour)							(gold) Gold
2000	World Ringette Championships							(gold) Gold
2002	World Ringette Championships							(silver) Silver
2004	World Ringette Championships							(gold) Gold
2007	World Ringette Championships	4	4	11	15	-	4	(gold) Gold
2010	World Ringette Championships	5	2	2	4	-	0	(gold) Gold

== Awards ==
- (gold) SM Ringette gold - 2011, 2017, ?, ? - 4 Finnish championship titles
- (gold) Gold medal - World Ringette Championships - 1994, 2000, 2004, 2007, 2010
- (silver) World Ringette Championship silver - 1996, 2002
- (silver) Ringette World Club Championship silver for club teams - 2011
- (silver) Canadian Ringette Championships - silver- 2001-02

== Individual honours ==
- Voted to the elite Finnish semi-professional ringette league, SM Ringette, All-Star Team for the 2001–02 and 2002–03 seasons
