= Anne Pohjola =

Elite Finnish ringette player

Personal information
- Nationality: Finland
- Born: 18 April 1985 (age 41) Lapinlahti (Finland)
- Height: 5 ft 5 in (165 cm)
- Weight: 150 lb (68 kg; 10 st 10 lb)

Sport
- Country: Finland; World
- Position: Forward
- Shoots: Left
- Team: (Finland) Lapinlahden Luistin -89, Ringeten SM-sarja; Team Finland Sr.; (Finland) Raision Nuorisokiekko (RNK Flyers), SM Ringette
Medal record
Event	1st	2nd	3rd
WRC	7	0	0
RWCC	1	0	0
SMRC (Nationals)	11	?	?
Total	19	0	0
Ringette
World Ringette Championships
Representing Finland
Gold medal – first place	2007 Canada	
Gold medal – first place	2010 Finland	
Gold medal – first place	2013 Canada	
Gold medal – first place	2016 Finland	
Gold medal – first place	2019 Canada	
Gold medal – first place	2022 Finland	
SM Ringette Championships (Nationals)
Gold medal – first place	2002, 2003, 2009, 2010, 2012, 2013, 2014, 2015, 2016, 2018, 2021	
- Updated on August 27, 2023

Anne Pohjola (born April 18, 1985, in Kuopio, Lapinlahti), is an elite Finnish ringette player who plays forward and is a prolific scorer. She has been a member of the Finland national ringette team several times and currently plays in Finland's semi-professional ringette league, SM Ringette (formerly Ringeten SM-sarja). The league is known as the Finnish national ringette league to English speakers.

In SM Ringette, she has played for various clubs, mainly Lapinlahden Luistin -89, and has served as captain of that club.

== Ringette career ==
=== World Ringette Championships ===
Pohjola has won seven World Ringette Championships with the Finland national ringette team.

At the 2007 World Ringette Championships, she helped Team Finland (Senior) win by scoring the game winning overtime goal. In the final game against Canada, she scored two goals. With a final score of (5-4) Pojhola helped her country win the world title.

At the 2017 World Ringette Championships, she scored one goal against Team Canada in the first final game where Finland won 7–4, and five of Finland's 11 goals in the second final game.

At the 2019 World Ringette Championships, she scored four of Team Finland Senior's 11 goals in the first final and three of Finland's five goals in the second final.

=== Ringette World Club Championship ===
At the Ringette World Club Championship in 2011, she won gold with Lapinlahden Luistin -89 and was named the Most Valuable Player of the tournament.

=== SM Ringette ===
In the Finnish national ringette league, SM Ringette (formerly Ringeten SM-sarja), Pohjola played for Lapinlahden Luistin -89 until the 2013–2014 season, then for a while with Nokian Urheilijat until returning to Lapinlahti. More recently she has played for the Raision Nuorisokiekko (RNK Flyers).

Pohjola has won the Finnish national championship 11 times (in 2002, 2003, 2009, 2010, 2012, 2013, 2014, 2015, 2016, 2018, and 2021). The 2015 and 2016 championships victories occurred when she played with Nokian Urheilijat.

After the 2021–22 season, Pohjola is in the top spot in the all-time points leaderboard of the SM Ringette league. She has played 599 matches in the SM division and scored a total of 3,406 points (1,661 goals and 1,745 assists).

== Statistics ==
=== International ===
Statistics per competition
Year	Event	GP	G	A	Pts	+/-	PIM	Results
2007	World Ringette Championships	4	17	11	28	-	6	(gold) Gold
2010	World Ringette Championships	5	5	14	19	-	6	(gold) Gold

== Women's ice hockey ==
Pohjola also played women's ice hockey for a time in Naisten Mestis starting in the 2014–15 season when Lapinlahden Luistin -89 switched from ringette to ice hockey but has since retired.

== Awards ==
- 4 Finnish championship titles (all won with Lapinlahden Luistin -89.
- (gold) Gold medal at the 2007 World Ringette Championships
- (gold) Gold medal at the 2010 World Ringette Championships
- (gold) Gold with club Lapinlahden Luistin -89 at the Ringette World Club Championship in 2011

== Individual honours ==
- Voted MVP player at the 2007 World Ringette Championships
- Top scorer (goalscorer) in the elite Finnish national ringette league, SM Ringette, for the 2008–09 season with a total of 191 points (74 goals and 117 assists) in 23 games which was a historic record in Finland
- Voted MVP player of the Finnish National Championship 2008-09 and 2010-11
- Voted to the 2010 World Ringette Championships All-Star Team

== Personal life ==
Anne Pohjola's sister Mari Pohjola is also a ringette player. Their father, Juha Pohjola, who died of cancer in the fall of 2015, won several Finnish ringette championships (SM Ringette) as the coach of Lapinlahden Luistin -89.

== See also ==
- Ringette
- Finland national ringette team
- World Ringette Championships
- SM Ringette
- Marjukka Virta
- Susanna Tapani
