= Marjukka Virta =

Retired elite Finnish ringette player, current Finnish ringette coach

Personal information
- Nationality: Finland
- Born: 8 February 1983 (age 43) Karinainen (Finland)
- Height: 5 ft 9 in (175 cm)
- Weight: 154 lb (70 kg; 11 st 0 lb)

Sport
- Country: Finland; World
- Position: Forward
- Shoots: Left
- Team: Team Finland Sr.; (Finland) Lapinlahden Luistin -89, Ringeten SM-sarja; Turun Ringette, SM Ringette; Hyvinkää Ringette, SM Ringette; Espoon Kiekkoseura, SM Ringette; Tuusula Blue Rings, SM Ringette; NoU Ringette, SM Ringette
Medal record
Event	1st	2nd	3rd
WRC	6	1	0
SMRC (Nationals)	9	?	?
Total	15	1	0
Ringette
World Ringette Championships
Representing Finland
Silver medal – second place	2002 Canada	
Gold medal – first place	2004 Sweden	
Gold medal – first place	2007 Canada	
Gold medal – first place	2010 Finland	
Gold medal – first place	2013 Canada	
Gold medal – first place	2016 Finland	
Gold medal – first place	2019 Canada	
SM Ringette Championships (Nationals)
Gold medal – first place	9	
- Updated on August 28, 2023

Marjukka Virta (born 1983 in Karinainen, Finland) is a retired elite Finnish ringette player who played forward in semi-professional ringette in Finland and for the Finland national ringette team, but now coaches the sport.

Virta (now retired as a player) has won six World Ringette Championships gold and one silver as a player for Team Finland Senior. For six of those national team world victories, Virta was the captain.

As a semi-professional player, Virta played in Finland's SM Ringette league, Finland's premiere ringette league, formerly known as Ringeten SM-sarja.

The Finnish ringette association, Ringette Finland, froze Virta's jersey number 4 on November 1, 2022, in Turku and is the first Finnish ringette player in history to receive this honour. The freeze officially took place in the Rajupaja Areena before the game against Team Canada.

== Career ==
Marjukka Virta has been playing ringette since she was 8 years old and during her junior career played for the TPS Turku sports club. She eventually won the Finnish junior championship silver medal. Virta played ice hockey for a time as well, but in 2006 decided to focus only on ringette because of the sense of belonging.

=== World Ringette Championships ===
Virta has competed as a ringette player for Team Finland and was captain six times.

At her first world championships, the 2002 World Ringette Championships, she won silver.

At the 2007 World Ringette Championships, the final was between Team Canada and Team Finland. Both teams played in overtime because with just over a minute remaining in regulation time, Virta scored the goal that tied the game 4-4. It was her teammate, Anne Pohjola, who scored the game-winning goal that allowed Finland to win the gold medal and the world title.

At the 2010 World Ringette Championships, she was named captain of the Finland national ringette team and once again led her team to the world title.

At the 2013 World Ringette Championships she was chosen as the tournament's Most Valuable Player.

As a coach, she was one of the assistant coaches of 2022 Team Finland Senior at the 2022 World Ringette Championships when the team won gold.

=== SM Ringette ===
Virta joined the semi-professional elite national ringette league of Finland. Ringeten SM-sarja, now called SM Ringette, is known as the Finnish national ringette league by English speakers.

Finland's Association of Sports Journalists selected Virta as the best ringette player of 2014, and in 2020 she was awarded the Agnes Jacks Trophy as the most valuable player in SM Ringette. She was selected to the All Stars team of SM Ringette in 2003, 2008, 2010, 2020 and 2021.

While a player, Virta represented various clubs including: Turun Ringette, Hyvinkää Ringette, Espoon Kiekkoseura, Lapinlahden Luistin -89, Tuusula Blue Rings, and NoU Ringette. As a player with Lapinlahden Luistin -89, she won the national championship twice and since 2016 has been the player-coach for the team.

She won the Finnish championship with the Lapinlahti team in 2009, 2010, 2012, 2013, 2014, 2018 and 2021 and with Nokia (NoU) in 2015 and 2016.

Virta last played for Lapinlahden Luistin -89 for the 2021–22 season after which she retired as a player. She finished in second place after the 2021–22 season in the all-time point statistics of SM Ringette. She has played 620 matches in the SM division and scored a total of 3,088 power points (1,408 goals and 1,680 assists). She crossed the 3 000 power point mark as the second player after Anne Pohjola and the 600 game mark as the fourth.

== Statistics ==
=== International ===
Statistics per competition
Year	Event	GP	G	A	Pts	+/-	PIM	Results
2007	World Ringette Championships	4	10	10	20	-	8	(gold) Gold
2010	World Ringette Championships	5	7	11	18	-	2	(gold) Gold

== Trophies and individual honours ==
=== Awards ===
- 2 Finnish national championship titles (SM Ringette)
- (gold) Gold Medal at the 2007 World Ringette Championships
- (gold) Gold Medal at the 2010 World Ringette Championships

== See also ==
- Ringette
- Finland national ringette team
- World Ringette Championships
- SM Ringette
- Salla Kyhälä
- Anne Pohjola
- Susanna Tapani
