= Sweden Ringette Association =

Ringette governing body of Sweden

Sweden Ringette Association Svenska Ringetteförbundet
- Sport: Ringette
- Founded: 1994; 31 years ago
- Headquarters: Solna
- Coach: Team Sweden Sr. (2022); Bruce Graham: Team Sweden Sr. (2025); Matti "Masa" Virtanen

Official website
- sweringette.se
- (Sweden)

The Sweden Ringette Association, (Swedish: Svenska Ringetteförbundet) sometimes abbreviated in English as the "SRA", is the national governing body for the sport of ringette in Sweden and was founded in 1994. The SRA is responsible for the promotion of ringette on a nationwide basis and organizes the country's elite national ringette competition, the Ringette Dam-SM, which was also established in 1994. In 2003, the SRA was elected as an associate member of the Swedish Sports Confederation (Swedish: Riksidrottsförbundet, RF).

Ringette was introduced to Sweden in the 1980s. Before the SRA was established, members of the Sweden ringette community helped the country become a member of the International Ringette Federation in 1986, which at the time was known as the "World Ringette Council". The SRA is also responsible for scouting ringette talent in Sweden in order to create the Sweden national ringette team who then compete at the World Ringette Championships (WRC). The SRA organized the WRC in 1996 and 2004.

Historically, while Team Sweden Senior has competed regularly since the 1992 World Ringette Championships, Team Sweden Junior has only competed occasionally, making their first world appearance at the 2016 World Ringette Championships. Team Sweden senior now competes in the Senior Pool, while Team Sweden Junior competes in the Junior Pool.

== History ==
Ringette was introduced to Sweden in the 1980s. The first ringette club was Ulriksdals SK Ringette (USK Ringette) (Swedish: Ulriksdals sportklubb ringette), formed in 1980 in Solna, with most Swedish ringette associations located in the surrounding Mälardalen region. There are programs of twin towns between the Sweden Ringette Association and Canadian associations for the development of the sport within the Swedish population. In Sweden more than 6,000 girls are registered to play ringette each year.

== Development ==
Year	Action	Organization, Event, or League
1980	Ringette is introduced to Sweden in Solna	Solna, Stockholm
1980	The first ringette club in Sweden is created in Solna	Ulriksdals SK Ringette (USK Ringette) (Swedish: Ulriksdals sportklubb ringette)
1986	Sweden becomes a member of the "World Ringette Council", now known as the International Ringette Federation (IRF)	International Ringette Federation (formerly the "World Ringette Council")
1992	Team Sweden (now Team Sweden Senior) makes its world debut at the World Ringette Championships	1992 World Ringette Championships: 1992 Seniors
1994	Established Sweden's national ringette organization	Sweden Ringette Association (Swedish: Svenska Ringetteförbundet)
1994	Established Sweden's elite national ringette championships	Ringette Dam-SM
2003	Elected as an associate member of Sweden's national amateur sports association	Swedish Sports Confederation (Swedish: Riksidrottsförbundet, RF)
2016	Team Sweden Junior makes its world debut at the World Ringette Championships	2016 World Ringette Championships: 2016 Juniors

== Semi-professional league ==
Ringette Dam-SM, Sweden's elite national ringette championships, were established in 1994, the same year the Swedish Ringette Association was formed. SM stands for, "Swedish Championship", (Swedish: svenska mästerskapet).

Several junior teams and numerous amateur teams are connected with its 7 semi-pro clubs. The league groups together seven semi-professional women's clubs:

- Ulriksdals SK Ringette (established in 1980)
- Kista Hockey
- IFK Salem
- IK Huge
- Järna SK
- Segeltorps IF
- Sollentuna HC

Ulriksdals SK Ringette also competed in the Ringette World Club Championship in 2011 in Turku, Finland, finishing in sixth place.

== National teams ==
The Sweden national ringette team, a.k.a. "Team Sweden", first competed at the second World Ringette Championships in Helsinki, Finland, from March 4 to 8, at the 1992 World Ringette Championships. The team now represents the nations elite senior level in the sport and has competed in every world championship since.

A junior tournament did not exist until the 2009 World Junior Ringette Championships, but the tournament then merged with the senior tournament in 2013. It wasn't until the 2016 World Ringette Championships that Team Sweden Junior made its world debut. However, Team Sweden Junior does not compete internationally on a regular basis.

== See also ==
- Ringette
- Ringette Canada
- Ringette Finland
- International Ringette Federation
