= 2002 World Ringette Championships =

2002 edition of the World Ringette Championships

6th World Ringette Championships

Tournament details
- Host country: Canada
- City: Edmonton
- Venue: Northlands AgriCom Arena
- Dates: November 25–30, 2002
- Teams: 4

Final positions
- Champions: Canada (2nd title)
- Runners-up: Finland
- Third place: United States
- Fourth place: Sweden

The 2002 World Ringette Championships (2002 WRC) was an international ringette tournament and the 6th (XI) World Ringette Championships. The tournament was organized by the International Ringette Federation (IRF) and was contested in Edmonton, Alberta, Canada, between November 25 and November 30, 2002, at the Northlands AgriCom Arena, now called the Edmonton Expo Centre. The final match was broadcast in Canada and followed by over 140,000 televiewers.

== Overview ==
The 2002 victory by Team Canada was considered particularly notable. In 2000, Team Canada was defeated by a score of 4–3 in extra time against Team Finland, but in WRC 2002, Team Canada took its revenge by defeating their arch-rival by a score of 3–1 in front of a sell-out crowd of 3850 supporters. The final match was broadcast in Canada by the Canadian Broadcasting Corporation (CBC) and followed by 144,000 Canadian televiewers.

Alberta Sports Hall of Fame and Ringette Canada Hall of Fame inductee, Phyllis Sadoway, was the assistant coach of Team Canada in 2002.

== Venue ==
Edmonton Expo Centre Previously called: Northland AgriCom
Host venue
Location	Canada – Edmonton, Alberta
Constructed	Opened: 1984; Expanded: 2009
Capacity	

== Teams ==
2002 WRC Rosters
2002 Team Finland
2002 Team Canada
(United States) 2002 Team USA
2002 Team Sweden

== Final standings ==
	Team
1st place, gold medalist(s)	Team Canada
2nd place, silver medalist(s)	Team Finland
3rd place, bronze medalist(s)	(United States) Team USA
4th	Team Sweden

== Rosters ==
=== Team Finland ===
The 2002 Team Finland team competed at 2002 WRC. Marjukka Virta and Petra Ojaranta were present.

=== Team Canada ===
The 2002 Team Canada Senior team competed in the 2002 World Ringette Championships. The 2002 Team Canada team included the following:

Name
Keely Brown
Kim Beach
Sarah Ianni (née Miller)
Leanne Ross
Michelle Lemieux
Jacinda Rolph
Carly Ross
Alexis Snowdon
Maria (McKenzie) Thompson
Megan Todd
Laura Warner (Captain)
Michelle Henry
Danielle (Hobday) Hildebrand (#3)
Shelly Hruska (#9)
Gaetane Manaigre
Nadia Tomy (#25)
Barb Bautista
Jacqueline Gaudet
Jennifer Wakefield (née Gaudet)
Jodi Jensen
Melanie Daraiche
Erin Gray
Marion Clark
Cheryl Prosser (#19)
Leah Jones (#27)
Team Staff
Lorrie Horne (Head coach)
Phyllis Sadoway (Assistant coach)
Peter Semonick (Assistant coach)
Blair Whitmarsh (Mental Skills Coach)
Connie Klassen (Trainer)
Kristin Albo (Manager)

Preceded by Espoo and Lahti 2000	World Ringette Championships; Edmonton; 2002 World Ringette Championships	Succeeded by Stockholm 2004
