= 2000 World Ringette Championships =

2000 edition of the World Ringette Championships

5th World Ringette Championships

Tournament details
- Host country: Finland
- Dates: November 15–18, 2000
- Teams: 4

Final positions
- Champions: Finland
- Runners-up: Canada
- Third place: United States
- Fourth place: Sweden

The 2000 World Ringette Championships (2000 WRC) was an international ringette tournament and the 5th (X) official World Ringette Championships. The tournament was organized by the International Ringette Federation (IRF) and was contested in Espoo and Lahti in Finland, between November 15–18, 2000.

== Overview ==
Participating teams in the 2000 WRC included Team Canada, Team Finland, Team Sweden, and Team USA. All games used three periods for their playing format.

Team Finland and Team Canada played a two-game world championship final. The first final was played on November 15, 2020, in Lahti, and the second final was played on November 18, 2000, in Espoo. Finland won the first game in Lahti with a score of 5-4. In Espoo, Team Canada and Team Finland faced each other for the second time which final which was the deciding match. Finland tied the Canadians with a final score of 5-5 (3-2, 1-1, 1-2). Finland became the world champion with a combined score of 3-1 points while Canada failed to win the world title by finishing in second place. In the bronze medal match, Team USA defeated Team Sweden 9–0.

== Venue ==
Venues were Espoo and Lahti, Finland.

== Teams ==
2000 WRC Rosters
2000 Team Finland
2000 Team Canada
(United States) 2000 Team USA
2000 Team Sweden

== Final standings ==
	Team
1st place, gold medalist(s)	Team Canada
2nd place, silver medalist(s)	Team Finland
3rd place, bronze medalist(s)	(United States) Team USA
4th	Team Sweden

== Rosters ==
=== Team Finland ===
The 2000 Team Finland team included the following:

Pos.	Name
Goalie
Goalie
Goalie
Goalie
	Arja Oksanen
	Kirsi Annila
	Petra Ojaranta
	Annukka Koivuniemi
	Kristiina Vidlund
	Kristiina Siitonen
	Sini Forsblom
	Jasmine Lönnroth
	Riikka Vainio
	Katja Kortesoja (Captain)
	Kristiina Heinonen.
Team Staff
Head coach	Krister Åberg
Assistant coach	Timo Himberg
Assistant coach
Trainer

=== Team Canada ===
The 2000 Team Canada team included the following:

Name
Keely Brown
Lisa Brown (Captain)
Lisa DiPasquale
Michelle MacKinnon
Maria (McKenzie) Thompson
Alexis Snowdon
Megan Todd
Laura Warner
Jennifer (Willan) Krochak
Daina Haubrich (Alternate)
Amanda Snell
Danielle (Hobday) Hildebrand
Nadia Tomy
Nancy Blouin
Karen (Duguay) Bunting
Jackie Gaudet (Alternate)
Sarah Miller
Lisa Newton
Kim Poirier
Tina Pineau
Suzanne MacDonald
Marion Clark
Kim Stephenson
Team Staff
Head Coach	Deb Marek
Assistant coach	Lyndsay Wheelans
Assistant coach
Trainer

== See also ==
- World Ringette Championships
- International Ringette Federation
- Canada national ringette team
- Finland national ringette team
- Sweden national ringette team
- United States national ringette team

Preceded by Summit Series/Euro Tour 1998	World Ringette Championships; Espoo and Lahti; 2000 World Ringette Championships	Succeeded by Edmonton 2002
