= VG-62 =

Multi-sport club in Finland

- Sport: Ice hockey; volleyball; football; figure skating; ringette
- Founded: Naantali, Finland, 1962; 64 years ago

Official website
- www.vg-62.fi

VG-62 is a sports club based in Naantali, Finland. It was founded in 1962 and the name is an abbreviation of Naantali's old Latin name, "Vallis gratiae". VG-62 is particularly well known for their exemplary youth operations, for which the club has been recognised with a Nuori Suomi (Young Finland Association) award.

== History ==
Naantali's VG-62 sports club has several teams in many sports, including ice hockey, volleyball, football, figure skating, and ringette.

== Ringette ==
VG-62 is the home of the VG-62 ringette club.

Alpo and Jan Lindström founded the VG-62 ringette club near the end of the 1970s. The ringette club eventually went on to compete in Finland's national ringette league, Ringeten SM-sarja, now known as SM Ringette.

== Notable footballers ==
- Jermu Gustafsson
- Pauno Kymäläinen

== See also ==
- Ringette Finland
- International Ringette Federation
