= Porin Kärpät =

Former Finnish sports team

- Sport: ice hockey, football, bandy, rinkball, handball, basketball
- Founded: 1932
- Disbanded: 2011
- Based in: Pori, Finland
- Arena: Isomäki Ice Hall (1990–2011)
- Colours

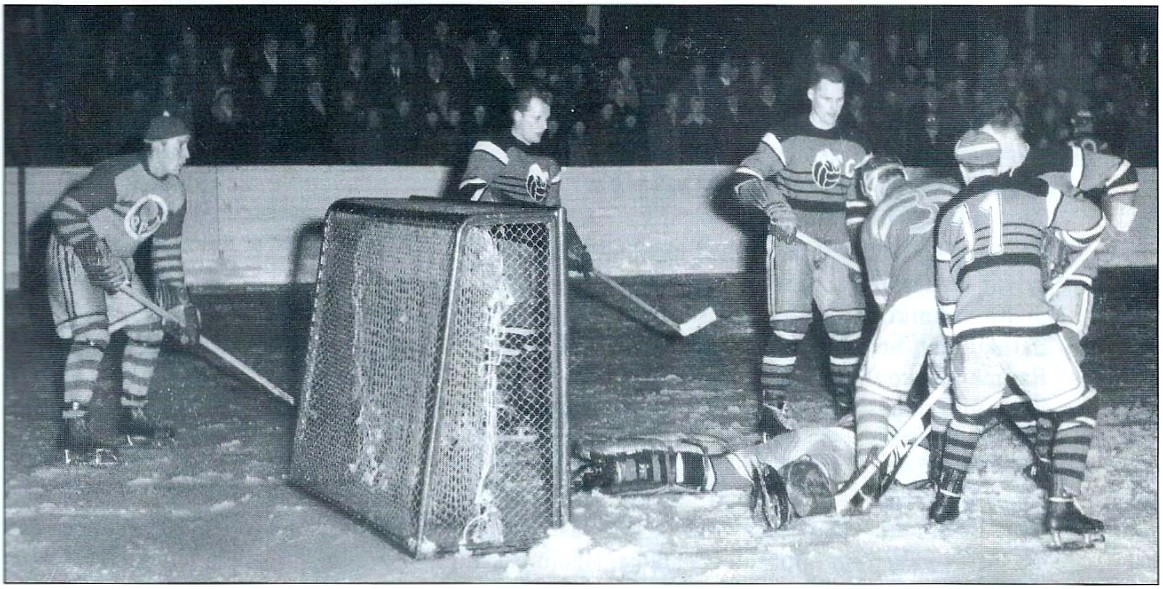
Porin Kärpät playing ice hockey against Porin Pallo-Toverit (FC Jazz) in the 1950s

Porin Kärpät (Finnish for "Pori Ermines") was a multi-sport club based in Pori, Finland. The club was founded in 1932, and disestablished in 1960, but was re-established again in 1990 and disestablished in 2011. Kärpät had sections in ice hockey, football, bandy, rinkball, handball, and basketball.

== Ice hockey ==
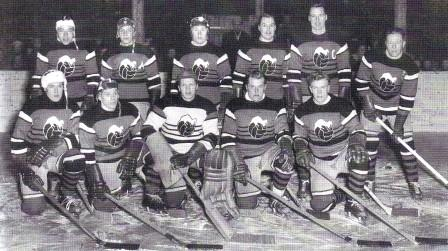
Team photo of the 1956–57 Kärpät squad, which was close to being promoted to the SM-sarja.

Porin Kärpät established its place in the Suomen sarja, the 2nd level of ice hockey, in the 1950s. In the 1956–57 season, Kärpät won their group and advanced to the SM-sarja qualifiers. Kärpät's opponents were IFK Helsingfors, Kotkan Reipas and Kalevan Pallo. Kärpät lost its first game to IFK 5–4, but beat Reipas 5–1. The deciding match was against KalPa. Kärpät already had a 3–0 lead, but the game ended in a 4–4 tie. Kärpät was tied with IFK and KalPa, but fell to 3rd place with goal difference and thus did not get promoted to the SM-sarja.

Porin Kärpät and Porin Palloilijat merged their operations in 1960 and formed Porin Karhut, which later merged with RU-38 to form Porin Ässät still plays ice hockey at the top level of Finland.

Kärpät's ice hockey team was disestablished in 1960 after the merger with PoPa, but a women's team was established in 2007 but the team was disestablished already in 2010.

== Rinkball ==
After the merger with PoPa, Kärpät still never stopped existing as a registered club, so they made a comeback in 1990 when rinkball players from Pori joined the I-division with Kärpät's name. Kärpät were promoted to the Kaukalopalloliiga in 1998 and it won the Finnish rinkball championship 4 times (2004, 2005, 2006, 2009).

== Honors ==
=== Finnish rinkball championships ===
- (gold) Champion (4): 2004, 2005, 2006, 2009
- (silver) Runner-up: (4): 2003, 2007, 2010, 2011
  - First in the regular season (4): 2004, 2005, 2010, 2011

== Notable players and coaches ==
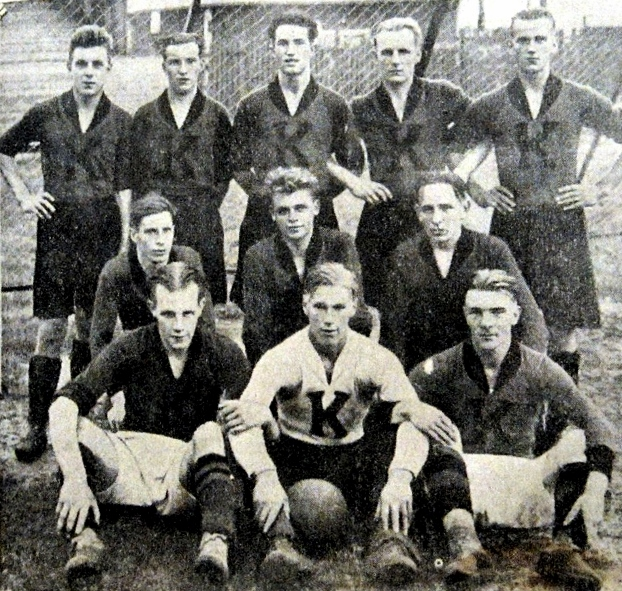
Porin Kärpät football team in 1936

=== Football ===
- Erkki Harell
- Tauno Takala
- Antero Lartola

=== Rinkball ===
- Antero Kivelä (coach)
- Jari Härkälä (coach)
- Mikael Kotkaniemi

=== Ice hockey ===
- Sari Marjamäki
- Lasse Heikkilä
- Juha Rantasila
