= 1998 Summit Series =

1998 edition of the World Ringette Championships

1998 Summit Series

Tournament details
- Host countries: Finland; Sweden; Germany; France
- Dates: February 27–March 7, 1998
- Teams: 2

Final positions
- Champions: Finland
- Runners-up: Canada

The 1998 World Ringette Championships (1998 WRC) was an international ringette tournament initially meant to be the 5th (X) World Ringette Championships and was originally scheduled to be hosted in Moncton, New Brunswick, Canada.. However, a promotional five-game ringette "Summit Series" tour of Europe was organized instead with a series of games between Team Canada, and Team Finland between February 27 and March 7, 1998.

Officially dubbed the "1998 Summit Series / EuroTour", the games were contested in Finland, Sweden, Germany, and France. The event was organized by the International Ringette Federation (IRF). The 5th World Ringette Championships took place the following year at the 2000 World Ringette Championships.

== 1998 Summit Series ==
The 1998 Summit Series for international ringette was a European tour organized exclusively for the national ringette teams of Canada and Finland. It replaced the 1998 World Ringette Championship which was initially planned to be played in Moncton, New Brunswick, Canada. Both teams made stops in four different countries and cities: Turku (Finland), Gothenburg (Sweden), Osnabruck (Germany), and Colmar (France).

The fifth and final game took place in Colmar, France, where Team Finland beat Team Canada 10–8. Team Finland won the Summit Series against Canada 3–2.

== Venues ==
Venues were in Germany, Sweden, Finland, and France.

== Teams ==
1998 Summit Series/EuroTour Rosters
1998 Team Finland
1998 Team Canada

== Games ==
1998 Summit Series games
Date	Location	Time	1st	2nd
February 27, 1998	Turku, Finland	20H00	Finland (9)	Canada (7)
February 28, 1998	Turku, Finland	19H00	Finland (19)	Canada (5)
March 1, 1998	Turku, Finland	14H00	Canada (8)	Finland (7)
March 2, 1998	Gothenburg, Sweden (OT) Shootout	18H00	Canada (12)	Finland (11)
March 5, 1998	Osnabruck, Germany	09H00	Finland (9)	Canada (4)
March 7, 1998	Colmar, France	17H15	Finland (10)	Canada (8)

== Final results ==
	Team
1st place, gold medalist(s)	Team Finland: 3 wins in 5 games
2nd place, silver medalist(s)	Team Canada: 2 wins in 5 games

== Rosters ==
=== Team Finland ===
The 1998 Team Finland team included the following:

TEAM FINLAND
Number	Name
Forwards
3	Metta Perkkiö
6	Arja Oksanen
7	Virpi Karjalainen
8	Petra Ojaranta
10	Tia Heinonen
13	Kristiina Vidlund
16	Sanna Koivuniemi
21	Annukka Koivuniemi
25	Katja Kivelä
Defence
4	Kirsi Annila
11	Jasmine Lönnroth
12	Kristiina Heinonen
14	Emma-Lotta Laine
18	Katja Saarela
24	Anu Tuominiemi
26	Johanna Majuri
Goaltenders
30	Senna Nokkosmäki
35	Marjo Ikola

Team Staff
Position	Name
Team Leader	Eva Valtanen
Manager	Martti Kahelin
Manager	Raimo Heinonen
Head coach	Lyndsay Wheelans
Assistant coach	Timo Himberg⁣⁣
Goalie coach	Jari Toroskainen

=== Team Canada ===
Initially, the 1998 World Ringette Championships were to be held in Moncton, New Brunswick, Canada, but a promotional five-game ringette tour of Europe, "1998 Summit Series / EuroTour", was organized with competitions between Team Canada and Team Finland instead. 1998 Team Canada included, "athlete representation from each province and the Northwest Territories".

The 1998 Team Canada team included the following:

TEAM CANADA
Number	Name
Forwards
2	Gladie Turple (Forward–Defence)
9	Sue Dinham
12	Susan Coggles
15	Renée Virc
19	Tina Pineau
91	Shelley Reynolds
Centres
4	Lisa Brown - Captain
7	Sarah (Miller) Ianni
10	Cara Brown
18	Lisa Dipasquale
22	Angie MacPherson
20	Maria (McKenzie) Thompson
Defence
5	Karen Duguay
8	Laurie Cartman
11	Dominique Fréchette
16	Jodeen Canning
88	Tammy Wurtak
Goaltenders
1	Tamara Anderson
30	Amanda Snell

Team Staff
Position	Name
Head coach	Dave Mainwood
Assistant coach	Ron Gallinger
Assistant coach	Deb Marek
Assistant coach	Keith Williamson
Officials
Official	Stephan Blackman

== See also ==
- Canada national ringette team
- Finland national ringette team

Preceded by Stockholm 1996	World Ringette Championships; Turku, Gothenburg, Osnabruck, Colmar; 1998 Summit Series/EuroTour	Succeeded by Huddinge, Stockholm 2004
