= Jermu Gustafsson =

Finnish footballer (born 1986)

Personal information
- Full name: Jermu Pekka Gustafsson
- Date of birth: 22 June 1986 (age 40)
- Place of birth: Turku, Finland
- Height: 1.84 m (6 ft 1/2 in)
- Position: Defender

Team information
- Current team: FC Inter Turku (Head coach A-Youth)

Youth career
- BK-46

Senior career*
Years	Team	Apps	(Gls)
2005	VG-62		
2006–	FC Inter Turku	33	(2)
2008	→ FF Jaro (loan)	8	(0)

International career
2006–2007	Finland U21	7	(0)

Managerial career
- 2011–: FC Inter Turku A-Youth
- * Club domestic league appearances and goals

Jermu Pekka Gustafsson (born 22 June 1986) is a Finnish former footballer and current coach of the A Youth of FC Inter Turku.

== Career ==
He played during his career for FC Inter Turku, VG-62 and FF Jaro.

== International career ==
Gustafsson is member of the Finland national under-21 football team. He was captain of Finland team in the 2003 FIFA U-17 World Championship, which were held in Finland.
