= Ringette Finland =

Ringette governing body of Finland

Ringette Finland Suomen Ringetteliitto
- Sport: Ringette
- Membership: More than 10,000 players (2019): – 31 ringette clubs
- Founded: 1983; 43 years ago
- Headquarters: Helsinki
- Coach: Team Finland Sr. (2022); Pasi Kataja: Team Finland Jr. (2022); Nina Sundell

Official website
- ringette.fi
- (Finland)

Ringette Finland, (Finnish: Suomen Ringetteliitto ry) is the national governing body for the sport of ringette in Finland and was founded in 1983. It is responsible for the organization and promotion ringette on a nationwide basis and organizes Finland's semi-professional ringette league, SM Ringette, formerly known as Ringeten SM-sarja. In 1986 the organization became a member of the International Ringette Federation which at the time was known as the "World Ringette Council".

Ringette Finland is also responsible for scouting ringette talent in the country to create the Finland national ringette teams for both Team Finland Senior and Team Finland Junior who then compete at the World Ringette Championships.

Ringette was brought to Finland in 1979 by Juhani Wahlsten and the first ringette clubs in Finland were established in Turku. Players now participate in 31 ringette clubs, with important clubs in Naantali, Turku, Uusikaupunki, Lahti, and Greater Helsinki. The first international ringette tournament was hosted in Finland in 1986 and was sponsored by Finnair.

Today, the Finnish Ringette Coaches Association (Finnish: Suomen Ringettevalmentajat ry (SRiV)) is the sports association for Finnish ringette coaches.

== History ==
In Finland the three founding fathers of ringette are Juhani Wahlsten (a.k.a. "Juuso" Wahlsten) who introduced the sport to Finland, Antti Simola, the Finnish ringette association's first chairman, and Alpo Lindström, a ringette organizer from Naantali. A book on Ringette Finland was published on September 1, 2014, called "30 vuotta Ringeten historiaa Suomessa" (30 years of Ringette history in Finland) celebrating the organization's 30th anniversary. The book is a comprehensive account of the growth and development of Ringette in Finland, its culture, and its impact on the country's sports landscape. It features interviews with coaches, players, and other key figures associated with the sport and provides a deep dive into the history of ringette in the country.

The first recorded ringette game in Finland took place on January 23, 1979, and became the first ringette game to be played anywhere in Europe. Finland's first ringette club was Ringetteläisiä Turun Siniset, and the country's first ringette tournament took place in December of 1980.

In 1979, the invaluable assistance of Barry Mattern, who was the President of Ringette Canada at the time, allowed him to lead a team from Winnipeg, Manitoba's, North End and introduce ringette to Finland.

=== Juhani Wahlsten ===
In 1979, Juhani "Juuso" Wahlsten introduced ringette in Finland and is considered the "Father of Ringette" in the country. In 1979 he invited two coaches, Wendy King and Evelyn Watson, from Dollard-des-Ormeaux (a suburb of Montreal Quebec, Canada) to teach girls of various ages how to play ringette. Wahlsten first introduced the new sport to a group of players in Turku during ice hockey practice, then created some ringette teams in the area.

=== Alpo and Jan Lindström ===
Alpo Lindström (b. 23 January 1936, Uusikaupunki, Tevaluodo, d. 12 July 2021) and his son Jan Lindström introduced ringette to the city of Naantali towards the end of 1979, the same year Juhani Wahlsten introduced the sport to Finland for the first time. The previous year in 1978, Jan had been an exchange student in the United States where he saw girls playing ringette. Upon returning to Finland he created the VG-62 ringette club. Alpo served as chairman of the local ringette association, served as the VG-62 team coach, and sometimes as a team manager. Alpo played an important role in helping establish Finland's national ringette association in 1983 and later served as a member of the board of the International Ringette Federation.

=== Antti Simola ===
Antti Juhani Simola (b. 20 August 1942, Tampere – d. 16 August 2022, Tuusula) more commonly known as Antti Simola, was one of the individuals responsible for the creation of the "Finland Ringette Association" in 1983, now known as "Ringette Finland". Simola served as its first chairman and was its first and longest, continuously serving, honorary chairman. Simloa served as the first Vice-President of the World Ringette Council, which is now known as the International Ringette Federation (IRF), and was one of its founding members when it was established in 1986.

=== Ringette Association of Turku ===
The Ringette Association of Turku was established in 1981 with several Canadian coaches going to Turku to help teach, establish and design the training, and administration for its formation. The ski national week then organized an annual tournament to bring together all the ringette teams. Its 1985 tournament included several hundred girls making it impossible to combine into a single event all the age groups and categories of players. A number of different Canadian ringette teams from Manitoba, Canada, visited in the winter of 1986 with the help of former Ringette Canada President, Barry Mattern, and helped increase the popularity of the sport in Finland.

== Development ==
Year	Action	Organization, Event, or League
1978–79	Jan Lindström sees girls playing ringette in the USA where he is an exchange student. Returns to Finland in 1979 and creates the first ringette club in Naantali	(Finland) Jan Lindström; (Finland) Alpo Lindström; VG-62 ringette club in Naantali
1979	Ringette is introduced to Finland for the first time by Juhani Wahlsten	(Finland) Juhani Wahlsten; (Canada) Wendy King; (Canada) Evelyn Watson; Barry Mattern (Ringette Canada)
January 23, 1979	First recorded ringette game in Finland; first ringette game to be played in Europe	
1980	Established first ringette club	Ringetteläisiä Turun Siniset
December 1980	First ringette tournament	
1981	Established first ringette association	Ringette Association of Turku
May 5, 1983	Established national organization	Ringette Finland (Finnish: Suomen Ringetteliitto): Antti Simola (1983–1991); Alpo Lindström
1986	The first international ringette tournament is hosted in Finland in 1986 and is sponsored by Finnair.	First international ringette tournament; Sponsor: Finnair
1986	Finland becomes a member of the "World Ringette Council", now known as the International Ringette Federation (IRF)	International Ringette Federation (formerly the "World Ringette Council")
1987–88	Established semi-professional league	Ringeten SM-sarja (now known as "SM-Ringette")
1990	Team Finland (now Team Finland Senior) makes its world debut at the World Ringette Championships	1990 World Ringette Championships: 1990 Seniors
2009	Finland makes its world junior debut sending 2 separate regional teams to the first World Junior Ringette Championships	2009 World Junior Ringette Championships: Finland White Stars; Finland Blue Stars
2012	Team Finland Junior makes its world debut at the World Junior Ringette Championships having previously sent separate regional teams	2012 World Junior Ringette Championships: 2012 Juniors

== National teams ==
The Finnish national ringette team includes two separate teams: Team Finland Senior and Team Finland Junior. Both teams compete in the World Ringette Championships.

== Semi-professional league ==
SM Ringette, formerly "Ringeten SM-sarja", is Finland's elite, semi-professional league for the sport of ringette and its highest division. It's generally known as the "Finnish National Ringette League" by english speakers and is run by Ringette Finland. Finland's best ringette players compete in this league and many have gone on to compete for the Finland national ringette team.

== See also ==
- Ringette
- Ringette Canada
- Sweden Ringette Association
- Juhani Wahlsten
- Antero Kivelä
- International Ringette Federation
- Ringette World Club Championship
- World Ringette Championships
- National Ringette League (Canada)

== Sources ==
- Hyyppä, Emma (July 6, 2020). "Suomen Kaukalopallo- ja Ringetteliitto purkautuu – jatkaa toimintaansa kahdessa itsenäisessä liitossa" [Finnish Rinkball and Ringette Union splits - Continues as two separate unions]. Yle Uutiset (in Finnish).
- Pellinen, Sulevi. Kun rinkula valloitti Suomen: Suomen Ringetteliitto 1983-2013. Suomen Urheilumuseosäätiön julkaisuja (in Finnish). Vol. 46. Suomen urheilumuseosäätiö. ISBN 9789526644035. ISSN 0782-3843.
