= VG-62 (ringette) =

Semi-professional ringette team in Finland's national ringette league

- City: Naantali, Finland
- League: SM Ringette
- Founded: 1979
- Home arena: Aurinkoareena (capacity: 500)
- Colours
- Head coach: Arja-Riitta Oksanen
- Website: VG-62 Ringette Club.fi

Championships
- Playoff championships: 6: (silver) Silver: 5; (bronze) Bronze: 2

VG-62 Ringette is a ringette club in Finland from Naantali. The club was founded in 1979 and plays in the Finland national ringette league, SM Ringette. It is one of the sports divisions of the VG-62 sports club. VG-62 Ringette has won gold, silver, and bronze medals in the SM Ringette league. VG-62 also has B–F junior teams in ringette.

== History ==
Ringette was introduced to the city of Naantali towards the end of 1979 by a father-son duo, Alpo Lindström and his son, Jan Lindström, after Jan witnessed girls playing the sport while he had been an exchange student in the United States in 1978. Jan created the VG-62 ringette club once he returned to Finland. The ringette club is a division of the sports club VG-62.

Alpo served as chairman of the local ringette association, the VG-62 ringette team coach, and sometimes as the team's manager. He was instrumental in establishing Finland's national ringette association in 1983 (Ringette Finland) and later served as a member of the International Ringette Federation board.

== Description ==
VG-62 Ringette is one of the sports divisions of the VG-62 sports club. It plays in the SM Ringette league, the highest semi-professional ringette league in Finland's first division. The team colours are black, yellow, and red.

The team's home arena is Aurinkoareena, which was completed in 2002 with 500 seats.

== Achievements ==
The club has won gold, silver, and bronze medals in the SM Ringette league, the highest semi-professional ringette league in Finland's first division.
