= LL -89 =

Elite Finnish ringette and ice hockey club

Lapinlahden Luistin -89
- Nickname: LL-89
- City: (Finland) Lapinlahti
- League: Jääkiekon II-divisioona (gentlemen); SM Ringette (ladies); Women's mestizo qualifier
- Founded: 1989
- Home arena: Lapinlahden jäähalli
- Website: Ringette - LL-89.fi

Lapinlahden Luistin -89 (abbr. LL-89) in Lapinlahden, from the municipality Pohjois-Savosta, is a home club specializing in ice sports, whose sports include ice hockey, rinkball and ringette. The club's home arena is the Lapinlahti Ice Hall (Lapinlahden jäähalli). The club also has several junior teams in ice hockey and ringette.

== Ringette ==
SM Ringette's LL-89 has won the Finnish ringette championship nine times, in 2002, 2003, 2009, 2010, 2012, 2013, 2014, 2018 and 2021. LL-89 has also won the Ringette World Club Championship in the six-team tournament played in Turku in 2011.

In the years 2014–2016, the ringette team played two seasons in the women's ice hockey Mestis, from which they made a return to the ringette. In the 2016–2017 season, the team played in the Ringette First Division and at the end of the season moved up to the SM division. The club announced in the middle of the 2021 championship celebration that it would give up its place in the ringette SM division because many more experienced players had ended their careers. The club started to build a new rise with a young team from a lower league level.

Coach Juha Pohjola, the father of LL-89 ringette player Anne Pohjola, died of cancer in the fall of 2015. He had served as the team's coach during the club's first seven Finnish championships and the Ringette World Club Championship.

In the 2020–2021 season, the men's ice hockey team played in the North Savo hobby series. The women's ice hockey team, Red Lights, played the women's Mestis qualifier in the 2020–2021 season.

== See also ==
- Ringette
- SM Ringette
- RNK Flyers
- Anne Pohjola
- Marjukka Virta

== Sources ==
- Seuran kotisivut
- Ringeten SM-sarja
