= Antero Kivelä =

Finnish ice hockey player

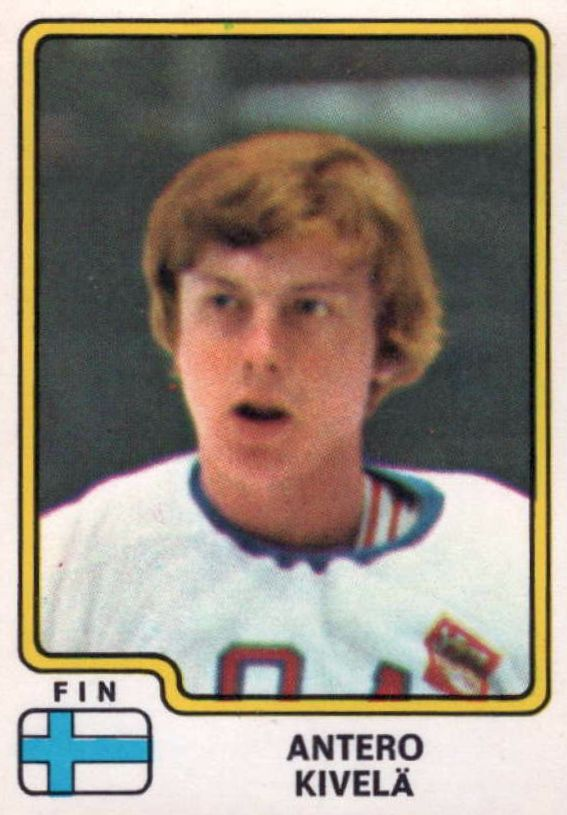
- Born: 26 December 1955 (age 70) Pori, Finland
- Height: 5 ft 10 in (178 cm)
- Weight: 179 lb (81 kg; 12 st 11 lb)
- Position: Goaltender
- Caught: Left
- Played for: Ässät
- National team: Finland
- Playing career: 1972–1989

Antero Simo Tapani Kivelä (born 26 December 1955) is a retired Finnish ice hockey goaltender. After his playing career, Kivelä coached several ice hockey, rinkball and ringette teams in Finland. Kivelä is also member of the city council in Pori for the Left Alliance.

Kivelä played his entire career for Ässät Pori. He made 58 appearances in the Finland national team and took part at the 1980 Winter Olympics in Lake Placid. Kivelä is also the chairman of women's soccer club NiceFutis.

== Coaching career ==
After his playing career in ice hockey, Kivelä went on to coach in various sports.

=== Rinkball ===
Kivelä coached Porin Kärpät in rinkball.

=== Ice hockey ===
Kivelä coached Kalajoen Junkkarit, Närpes Kraft, Vammalan Palloseura, Jokipojat, and Porin Ässät (league A and B) in ice hockey.

=== Ringette ===
Kivelä coached ringette from 1989 to 2015. He was a head coach in the Finnish national ringette league, SM Ringette, (formerly called Ringeten SM-sarja), for the Luvian Kiekko -82 ringette club for more than ten seasons.

==== Achievements as a coach ====
- (gold) SM Ringette gold: 2004, 2005, 2007
- (silver) Ringette World Club Championship silver for Ringette club teams: 2008
- (bronze) Ringette World Club Championship bronze for Ringette club teams: 2011

== Sources ==
- International Hockey Database
