= Rajupaja Areena =

Sports arena in Turku, Finland

Coordinates: 60°26′32″N 22°17′23″E

- Kupittaan monitoimihalli
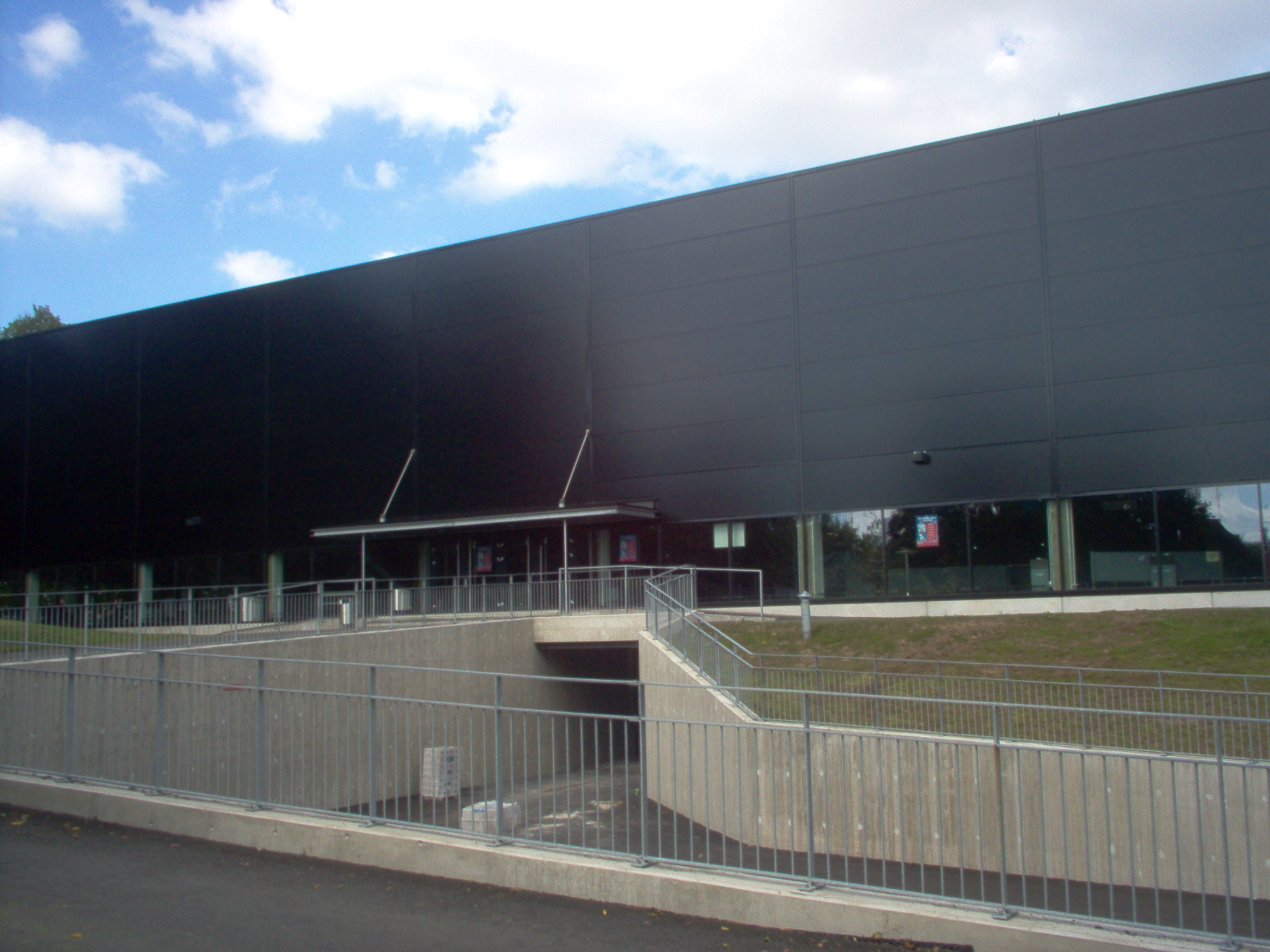
- Interactive map of Rajupaja Areena
- Former names: 1973–2006: Kupittaan jäähalli (Finnish); Kuppishallen (Swedish); 2011–2012: OS/G Areena; 2012–2022: Marli Areena
- Location: Kupittaa, Turku, Finland
- Capacity: 3,000

Construction
- Opened: 16 November 2006; Kupittaan jäähalli, 1973
- Demolished: 2005
- Rebuilt: 2005–06

Tenants
- TuTo (1973–1995, 1996–2005, 2006–); TPS (1973–1990); TPS Naiset; Turun Pyrkivä

Website
- Official website

Kupittaan monitoimihalli ('Kupittaa Multipurpose Hall'), also known as Rajupaja Areena for sponsorship reasons, is an arena in the Kupittaa district of Turku, Finland. It is primarily used for ice hockey and is the home arena of the Mestis team TUTO Hockey and the Auroraliiga team TPS Naiset. It was opened on 18 November 2006 on the original site of the Kupittaan jäähalli (Swedish: Kuppishallen), which had opened in 1973 and held 5,500 people.

Ringette is also played at the Rajupaja Areena. In 2011, it hosted the 2011 Ringette World Club Championship. Ten years later in 2022, it hosted an exhibition game between Team Canada and Team Finland with both teams later competing in Espoo at the 2022 World Ringette Championships.

== History ==
The first artificial ice field on the site was constructed in 1962; this, however, was an outdoor field where players were at the mercy of the weather. However, since the field was artificially frozen, the opening season was much longer than with natural ice. The first arena was constructed in 1973, allowing teams to play indoors. The new arena with a spectator capacity of 3,000 was inaugurated in November 2006.

The last games in the old arena were played in the spring of 2005. The new arena with spectator capacity of 3,000 was inaugurated in November 2006.

== Teams ==
Ice hockey teams including TPS of the Liiga, TUTO, and several others have played in this venue. When the new Elysée Arena was completed in November 1990, TPS moved there. Since then, the arena has been best known as the home of TUTO.

As of the 2021–22 season, the arena is home to three TUTO Hockey teams: TUTO Hockey of the Mestis, TUTO Hockey U20 of the U20 SM-sarja, and TUTO Hockey U18 of U18 SM-sarja; and two TPS Juniorijääkiekko teams: TPS Naiset of the Naisten Liiga and TPS Akatemia of the Naisten Suomi-sarja. Other ice hockey teams that call the arena home include the Chiefs of the 2. Divisioona and Kisurit Turku of the 3. Divisioona.

== See also ==
- List of indoor arenas in Finland
