= Erkki Harell =

Finnish footballer (1930–2014)

Personal information
- Date of birth: 12 March 1930
- Date of death: 25 March 2014 (aged 84)
- Position: Defender

International career
Years	Team	Apps	(Gls)
1957	Finland	8	(0)

Erkki Arvid Harell (12 March 1930 – 25 March 2014) was a Finnish footballer who played as a defender. He made eight appearances for the Finland national team in 1957.
