= RNK Flyers =

Elite Finnish ringette and ice hockey club

Raision Nuorisokiekko
- Nickname: RNK/RNK Flyers
- City: (Finland) Raisio
- League: II-divisioona Jääkiekon II-divisioona II Division (hockey), SM Ringette, (ringette)
- Founded: 1977
- Home arena: Raisio's Kerttula ice rinks
- Colours
- General manager: Pasi Kujala
- Media: Yle
- Website: Ringette - RNKFlyers.fi

Raision Nuorisokiekko ry (abbreviated as RNK) is a Raisio ice sports club whose sports are ice hockey and ringette. The club's teams play their home games in Raision in Kerttula's ice rinks.

The club's ice hockey representative team plays at Finland's fourth highest league level in the II division. Ringette's representative team plays in the SM Ringette division, the highest level in the country. In the 2011 Ringette World Club Championship, RNK finished second.

== Major league level ==
- Elite Prospects - Hockey Players from RNK
- Olli Kaskinen
- Markus Nurmi
- Marco Tuokko
- Henri Tuominen

== See also ==
- Ringette
- SM Ringette
- Lapinlahden Luistin -89
- Anne Pohjola
- Marjukka Virta

== Sources ==
- Seuran kotisivut
- Ringeten SM-sarja
- Seurajoukkueiden MM-kisat
