= Susanna Tapani =

Finnish athlete (born 1993)

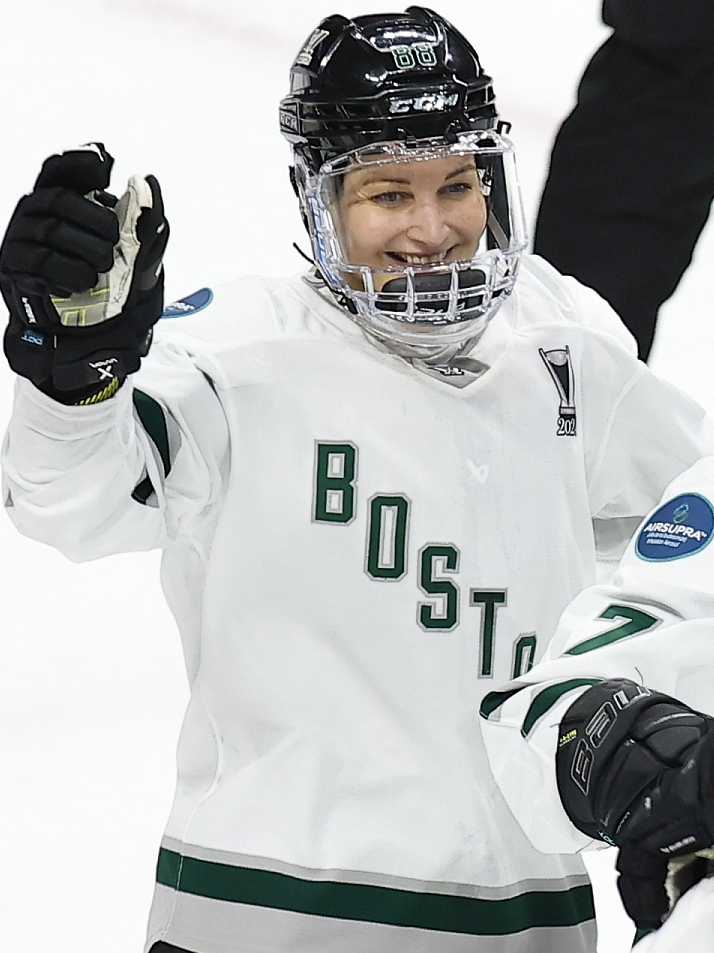
- Tapani with PWHL Boston in 2024

Personal information
- Nickname: Suski
- Born: 2 March 1993 (age 33) Laitila, Finland
- Education: Turku University of Applied Sciences
- Height: 1.77 m (5 ft 10 in)
- Weight: 65 kg (143 lb; 10 st 3 lb)
Ice hockey career
- Position: Centre
- Shoots: Left
- PWHL team Former teams: Boston Fleet: PWHL Minnesota; KRS Vanke Rays; Linköping HC; TPS Turku; Rauman Lukko; Espoo Blues; HPK Hämeenlinna
- National team: Finland
- Playing career: 2011–present

Sport
- Country: Finland
- Sport: Ringette
- Position: Centre, forward
- Shoots: Left
- League: SM Ringette
- Club: RNK Flyers
Medal record
Women's ice hockey
Olympic Games
Bronze medal – third place	2018 Pyeongchang	Ice hockey
Bronze medal – third place	2022 Beijing	Ice hockey
World Championship
Silver medal – second place	2019 Finland
Bronze medal – third place	2011 Switzerland
Bronze medal – third place	2015 Sweden
Bronze medal – third place	2017 United States
Bronze medal – third place	2021 Canada
Bronze medal – third place	2024 United States
Bronze medal – third place	2025 Czechia
Ringette
World Championship
Gold medal – first place	2010 Finland
Gold medal – first place	2016 Finland
Gold medal – first place	2017 Canada
Gold medal – first place	2019 Canada
Gold medal – first place	2022 Finland
World Junior Championship
Gold medal – first place	2009 Czech Republic
Silver medal – second place	2012 Canada

Susanna Jenni Tapani (born 2 March 1993) is a Finnish multi-sport athlete who competes in ice hockey, ringette, and in-line hockey. She plays professional ice hockey for the Boston Fleet of the Professional Women's Hockey League (PWHL) and is a member of both the Finnish national ice hockey team and Finnish national ringette team.

== Ice hockey career ==
Tapani played ice hockey in Finland in the Naisten Liiga with TPS Naiset, Lukko Naiset, Espoo Blues Naiset, and HPK Kiekkonaiset. In Sweden, Tapani played in the Swedish Women's Hockey League (SDHL) with Linköping HC Dam. In the United States, Tapani played with the North Dakota Fighting Hawks women's ice hockey program during the 2013–14 NCAA Division I women's ice hockey season. In Russia, Tapani played professional ice hockey in the Russian Zhenskaya Hockey League (ZhHL) with the KRS Vanke Rays during the later part of the 2021–22 ZhHL season.

During the 2019–20 and 2020–21 seasons, Tapani played with the TPS Juniorijääkiekko men's under-18 (U18) team, known as TPS U18 Akatemia, of the U18 Mestis/U18 Suomi-sarja until scheduling conflicts forced her to choose between ringette and ice hockey in November 2020. When it became clear that the TPS U18 Akatemia was unable or unwilling to alter its schedule to accommodate Tapani, she chose to leave the team and continue playing ringette with RNK Raisio of the Finnish Championship ringette league, the Ringeten SM-sarja (now known as SM Ringette), which is the ringette team she captains. Regarding the situation, Tapani stated, "I'm not commenting on the discussions [with TPS] or the way this came to be, but combining the two sports didn't fit when there were too many overlapping games."

She signed a contract for the 2023–24 season in the Premier Hockey Federation (PHF) with the Metropolitan Riveters in May 2023. The PHF was bought out and dissolved in late-June 2023 and her contract voided before she was able to play in the league.

Tapani was drafted in the fifth round, 25th overall by the PWHL Minnesota in the 2023 PWHL Draft. She was the first Finnish player to be drafted by a PWHL team and, along with Minttu Tuominen, was one of two Finnish players drafted in 2023. She later signed a two-year contract with Minnesota, through the 2024–25 season.

On 11 February 2024, Tapani was traded to PWHL Boston, along with defender Abby Cook, in exchange for Sophie Jaques in the PWHL's inaugural trade. Prior to being traded, Tapani had recorded two goals and three assists in nine games with Minnesota. During the 2024–25 season, she recorded 11 goals and seven assists in 30 games. She ranked third on the team in scoring with 18 points. On 17 June 2025, she signed a one-year contract extension with the Fleet.

=== Training ===
Tapani trained with several men's professional ice hockey players during the extended pause between the 2019–20 and 2020–21 seasons due to COVID-19. Under the direction of Ismo Lehkonen, the group – which included NHLers Kaapo Kakko, Artturi Lehkonen, Mikko Rantanen, and Rasmus Ristolainen, and several Liiga players – trained on the ice together for two hours a day. Jonne Virtanen, long-time Liiga player and member of the training group, noted that Tapani's strength and toughness would be well suited to a style of play that permitted checking and enthused, "Suski is the best female player that I have ever seen."

=== International play ===
Tapani made three appearances with the Finnish women's national under-18 ice hockey team at the IIHF Women's World U18 Championship, in 2009, 2010, and 2011, winning a bronze medal at the 2011 tournament.

As of 2020, Tapani ranks sixth in all-time points scored with the Finnish women's national team, tallying 75 goals and 72 assists for 147 points in 179 top division matches. She has represented Finland at every IIHF Women's World Championship since 2011, except the 2016 tournament. At the 2017 IIHF Women's World Championship, she was Finland's leading scorer and ranked fifth for scoring in the tournament overall with 3 goals and 6 assists for 9 points in 5 games.

Tapani has also competed with the Finnish national team at the Winter Olympic Games, debuting in the women's ice hockey tournament at the 2014 Winter Olympics in Sochi. Though Finland suffered their worst Olympic placement in team history, finishing in fifth place, Tapani saw individual success and tied teammate Riikka Välilä for third rank on the Finnish scoring list, with 1 goal and 4 assists for 5 points in six games. In the women's ice hockey tournament at the 2018 Winter Olympics in Pyeongchang, Finland won bronze and Tapani finished fourth in the team's scoring ranks, with 2 goals and 3 assists for 5 points in six games. The women's ice hockey tournament at the 2022 Winter Olympics in Beijing saw Tapani take another step in offensive production – she ranked first on the team in scoring with 6 goals and 2 assists for 8 points in seven games – and led Finland to another bronze medal victory.

In 2021, Pasi Mustonen, head coach of the Finnish national ice hockey team, called Tapani the team's best forward on a roster that also featured internationally recognized forwards like Michelle Karvinen and Petra Nieminen.

On 2 January 2026, she was named to Finland's roster to compete at the 2026 Winter Olympics.

=== Career statistics ===
==== Regular season and playoffs ====
Note: Italics indicate postseason relegation series; statistics not included in playoff totals.

Note: GP = Games played; G = Goals; A = Assists; Pts = Points; PIM = Penalty minutes;

			Regular season					Playoffs
Season	Team	League	GP	G	A	Pts	PIM	GP	G	A	Pts	PIM
2011–12	HPK	NSMs	4	2	2	4	6	4	2	1	3	0
2012–13	Kiekko-67 U18	U18 Suomi-sarja	6	4	2	6	0	—	—	—	—	—
2012–13	Espoo Blues	NSMs	3	0	2	2	2	5	2	1	3	2
2013–14	North Dakota Fighting Hawks	WCHA	24	8	12	20	12	—	—	—	—	—
2014–15	HPK	NSMs	8	6	4	10	10	6	7	14	21	2
2015–16	HPK	NSMs	5	4	3	7	0	8	4	4	8	2
2016–17	Lukko	NSMs	10	5	4	9	2	5	10	5	—	4
2017–18	Lukko	NSML	7	5	4	9	6	—	—	—	—	—
2018–19	TPS	NSML	16	24	8	32	14	—	—	—	—	—
2018–19	Linköping HC	SDHL	–	–	–	—	–	10	4	3	7	2
2019–20	TPS U18	U18 Suomi-sarja	16	5	10	15	2	—	—	—	—	—
2019–20	TPS	NSML	–	–	–	—	–	1	0	2	—	4
2020–21	TPS U18	U18 Mestis	1	0	2	2	0	—	—	—	—	—
2020–21	KRS Vanke Rays	ZhHL	–	–	–	—	–	3	1	2	3	0
2021–22	KRS Vanke Rays	ZhHL	12	7	5	12	8	8	4	6	10	4
2023–24	PWHL Minnesota	PWHL	9	2	3	5	2	—	—	—	—	—
2023–24	PWHL Boston	PWHL	17	2	6	8	6	6	3	1	4	2
2024–25	Boston Fleet	PWHL	30	11	7	18	10	—	—	—	—	—
NSML totals			23	29	12	41	20	—	—	—	—	—
SDHL totals			–	–	–	—	–	10	4	3	7	2
ZhHL totals			12	7	5	12	8	11	5	8	13	4
PWHL totals			56	15	16	31	18	8	3	1	4	2

==== International ====
Year	Team	Event	Result	GP	G	A	Pts	PIM
2009	Finland	U18	5th	5	3	0	3	0
2010	Finland	U18	5th	5	2	1	3	4
2011	Finland	U18	3rd place, bronze medalist(s)	6	4	2	6	33
2011	Finland	WC	3rd place, bronze medalist(s)	6	1	2	3	4
2012	Finland	WC	4th	6	1	0	1	2
2013	Finland	WC	4th	6	0	0	0	2
2014	Finland	OG	5th	6	1	4	5	2
2015	Finland	WC	3rd place, bronze medalist(s)	6	1	2	3	2
2017	Finland	WC	3rd place, bronze medalist(s)	6	3	6	9	2
2018	Finland	OG	3rd place, bronze medalist(s)	6	2	3	5	4
2019	Finland	WC	2nd place, silver medalist(s)	7	4	2	6	10
2021	Finland	WC	3rd place, bronze medalist(s)	7	3	2	5	6
2022	Finland	OG	3rd place, bronze medalist(s)	7	6	2	8	0
2022	Finland	WC	6th	6	3	2	5	0
2024	Finland	WC	3rd place, bronze medalist(s)	7	2	4	6	8
2025	Finland	WC	3rd place, bronze medalist(s)	7	1	1	2	2
2026	Finland	OG	6th	4	0	0	0	6
Junior totals				16	9	3	12	37
Senior totals				87	28	30	58	50

== Ringette career ==
Tapani's mother played ringette and introduced her daughter to the sport early on. Susanna began playing organized ringette around age five or six. At age sixteen, she made her debut in Finland's premier national ringette league, the Ringeten SM-sarja (RSMs; rebranded as SM Ringette in 2021), with Raision Nuorisokiekko (RNK; team has been called the RNK Flyers since 2015).

Tapani has played the entirety of her senior club career (as of 2024) with Raision Nuorisokiekko and contributed to Finnish Championship victories in 2011, 2017, and 2023. She served as team captain from the 2015–16 season through the conclusion of the 2022–23 season.

As one of SM Ringette's most outstanding players for more than a decade, Tapani led the league in scoring three times (2014–15, 2015–16, and 2022–23) and received the Agnes Jacks Trophy as the most valuable player (MVP) of SM Ringette six times (2012, 2013, 2016, 2017, 2021, and 2023). She was selected as an All Star in more than half of her seasons played in SM Ringette – eight times (2011, 2012, 2013, 2015, 2016, 2021, 2022 and 2023) across fifteen seasons.

Tapani's achievements have made her one of the most successful players in Finnish ringette history. In recognition of the impact she has had as a role model to those with competitive ringette aspirations, she was inducted as part of the first class of the Finnish Ringette Hall of Fame (Finnish: Suomalaisen ringeten kunniagalleria) in 2024. As a Hall of Fame inductee and pioneer of the sport, she has the right to use the honorary title Jääsärkija (lit. 'Ice Breaker').

=== International play ===
Tapani was a member of the Finnish national junior ringette team's Team White Stars, one of two under-19 teams that represented Finland at the inaugural International Ringette Federation (IRF) U-19 World Ringette Championships in 2009. She led all tournament skaters in scoring, with 15 goals and 9 assists for 24 points across 8 games, and was named MVP of the tournament as Finland's Team White Stars won gold. Three years later, she participated in the 2012 World Junior Ringette Championships, at which Finland iced one team, and took home a silver medal.

She has also played at the senior level with the Finnish national ringette team at the World Ringette Championships in 2010, 2016, 2017, 2019, and 2022, winning gold at each tournament.

=== Career statistics ===
Note: Blank cells indicate missing data. Totals are calculated from incomplete statistics.

==== Regular season and playoffs ====
Bold indicates led league

			Regular season					Playoffs
Season	Team	League	GP	G	A	Pts	PIM	GP	G	A	Pts	PIM
2009-10	RNK	RSMs	15	30	25	55	28
2010-11	RNK	RSMs	23	71	55	126	24	5	**17**	10	**27**	2
2011-12	RNK	RSMs	27	106	51	157	34	6	17	2	19	10
2012-13	RNK	RSMs	20	74	62	136	52	2	7	1	8	6
2013-14	RNK	RSMs	3	9	6	15	4	3	9	6	15	4
2014-15	RNK	RSMs	21	**97**	56	**153**	32	5	13	8	21	10
2015-16	RNK Flyers	RSMs	29	**131**	**106**	**237**	38	8	**27**	14	**41**	18
2016-17	RNK Flyers	RSMs	25	110	65	175	10	6	**16**	10	**26**	0
2017-18	RNK Flyers	RSMs	21	68	48	116	30	6	18	10	28	12
2018-19	RNK Flyers	RSMs	12	42	23	65	10	–	–	–	–	–
2019-20	RNK Flyers	RSMs	21	73	37	110	44	–	–	–	–	–
2020-21	RNK Flyers	RSMs	24	88	54	142	54	–	–	–	–	–
2021-22	RNK Flyers	SMR	18	51	28	79	26	–	–	–	–	–
2022-23	RNK Flyers	SMR	33	**129**	84	**213**	20
2023-24	RNK Flyers	SMR	10	33	15	48	12	0	0	0	0	0
SM Ringette totals			302	1,112	715	1,827	418	41	124	61	184	62

==== Club tournaments ====
Year	Team	Event	Result	GP	G	A	Pts	PIM
2011	RNK Flyers	WCC	2nd place, silver medalist(s)	7	25	20	45	14

==== International ====
Year	Team	Event	Result	GP	G	A	Pts	PIM
2009	Finland (White)	U19 WC	1st place, gold medalist(s)	8	15	9	24	8
2010	Finland	WC	1st place, gold medalist(s)	5	10	9	19	2
2012	Finland	U19 WC	2nd place, silver medalist(s)
2016	Finland	WC	1st place, gold medalist(s)	2	6	3	9	2
2017	Finland	WC	1st place, gold medalist(s)
2019	Finland	WC	1st place, gold medalist(s)
2022	Finland	WC	1st place, gold medalist(s)	2	8	8	16	0
Junior totals				8	15	9	24	8
Senior totals				9	24	20	44	4

=== Awards and honors ===
Award	Year
International
World Junior Championship Gold Medal	2009
World Junior Championship Silver Medal	2012
World Championship Gold Medal	2010
World Championship Gold Medal	2016
World Championship Gold Medal	2017
World Championship Gold Medal	2019
World Championship Gold Medal	2022
World Championship Tournament MVP	2022
SM Ringette
Finnish Champion	2010–11
Finnish Champion	2016–17
Finnish Champion	2022–23
Agnes Jacks Trophy; Most Valuable Player	2011–12
Agnes Jacks Trophy; Most Valuable Player	2012–13
Agnes Jacks Trophy; Most Valuable Player	2015–16
Agnes Jacks Trophy; Most Valuable Player	2016–17
Agnes Jacks Trophy; Most Valuable Player	2020–21
Agnes Jacks Trophy; Most Valuable Player	2022–23
All Star	2010–11
All Star	2011–12
All Star	2012–13
All Star	2014–15
All Star	2015–16
All Star	2020–21
All Star	2021–22
All Star	2022–23
Jäänsärkijä; Finnish Ringette Hall of Fame inductee #33	2024
Other
Ringette Player of the Year selected by the Finnish Sports Journalists' Association	2015
Ringette Player of the Year selected by the Finnish Sports Journalists' Association	2016
Ringette Player of the Year selected by the Finnish Sports Journalists' Association	2023

== Personal life ==
Tapani studied sports management at the Turku University of Applied Sciences.

Tapani is the subject of a Finnish documentary, Jäänsärkijä ('Icebreaker'), which follows her life as she competes in elite ringette, ice hockey, and in-line hockey from 2015 to 2019.
