= 2016 World Ringette Championships =

2016 edition of the World Ringette Championships

11th World Ringette Championships

Tournament details
- Host country: Finland
- City: Helsinki
- Venue: Helsinki Ice Hall
- Dates: 27 December 2015 – 3 January 2016
- Teams: 9

Final positions
- Champions: Senior Pool; Sam Jacks Series: Finland (Sr.) (6th title) Junior Pool; Canada (Jr.) (1st title)
- Runners-up: Senior Pool; Sam Jacks Series: Canada (Sr.) Junior Pool; Finland (Jr.)
- Third place: Sweden (Sr.)

The 2016 World Ringette Championships (2016 WRC) was an international ringette tournament and the 11th (XI) World Ringette Championships. The tournament was organized by the International Ringette Federation (IRF) and was contested in Helsinki, Finland between 27 December 2015, and 3 January 2016. The main competition took place at the Helsinki Ice Hall. It was the first time the Team Slovakia and the Team Czech appeared at the international tournament. This was also the first year Sweden formed the Sweden national junior ringette team (U19).

In addition to the main competition, a tournament known as the "Ringette Festival" was held for U14 teams.

== Overview ==
Participating national teams in the included: Team Canada Senior and Team Canada Junior (U19), Team Finland Senior and Team Finland Junior (U19), Team Sweden Senior and Team Sweden Junior (U19), Team USA Senior, Team Czech Republic Senior, and Team Slovakia Senior. Team Canada Juniors won the gold medal in the under 21 category.

Eighteen of the games were live-streamed online and made available for public viewing.

== Venue ==
Helsinki Ice Hall
Host venue
Location	Finland – Helsinki
Constructed	1966
Capacity	8,200 Seating capacity: 8,400

== Teams ==
Senior Pool	Junior Pool
2016 Team Finland Senior	2016 Team Finland Junior (U19)
2016 Team Canada Senior	2016 Team Canada Junior (U19)
2016 Team Sweden Senior	2016 Team Sweden Junior (U19)
(United States) 2016 Team USA Senior	(United States) 2016 Team USA Senior
2016 Team Czech Republic Senior	2016 Team Czech Republic Senior
2016 Team Slovakia Senior	2016 Team Slovakia Senior

== Final standings ==
=== Senior Pool results ===
The Senior Pool competition, also known as the "Sam Jacks Series", was a three-game series between Team Canada Senior and Team Finland Senior. Team Finland Senior won the gold medal and the Sam Jacks Trophy.

	Team
1st place, gold medalist(s)	Team Finland Senior
2nd place, silver medalist(s)	Team Canada Senior
3rd place, bronze medalist(s)	Team Sweden Senior
4th	(United States) Team USA Senior
5th	Team Czech Republic Senior
6th	Team Slovakia Senior

=== Junior Pool results ===
	Team
1st place, gold medalist(s)	Team Canada Junior (U19)
2nd place, silver medalist(s)	Team Finland Junior (U19)
3rd place, bronze medalist(s)	Team Sweden Senior
4th	(United States) Team USA Senior
5th	Team Sweden Junior (U19)
6th	Team Slovakia
7th	Team Czech Republic

== Rosters ==
=== Seniors ===
==== Team Finland Senior ====
The 2016 Team Finland Senior team included the following:

FINLAND SENIOR⁣
Number⁣	Name⁣
Forwards⁣
5⁣	Tanja Eloranta⁣⁣
6⁣	Fanny Impilä⁣⁣
9⁣	Elina Tahvanainen⁣⁣
12⁣	Siiri Saarikettu (née Kallionpä)
13⁣	Katariina Kurikko⁣⁣
14⁣	Tiia Halme⁣⁣
15⁣	Riikka Häyrinen
Centres⁣
4⁣	Marjukka Virta
7⁣	Jenni Viinamäki⁣⁣
10⁣	Anne Pohjola
11⁣	Susanna Tapani⁣⁣
Defence⁣
2⁣	Hanna Ropanen⁣⁣
3⁣	Pauliina Auvinen⁣⁣
16⁣	Annamari Tuokko⁣⁣
17⁣	Kaisa Viren⁣⁣
21⁣	Mira Sydänmaa⁣⁣
Goaltenders⁣
30⁣	Maria Perkkola⁣
31⁣	Camilla Kortesniemi⁣
32⁣	Ilona Nurmi⁣

Team Staff⁣
Position	Name
Manager⁣	Pirjo Lehtonen⁣
Head coach⁣	Timo Himberg
Coach⁣	Kim Forsblom⁣
Trainer⁣	Marja Koponen⁣
Trainer⁣	Mika Salminen⁣
Trainer⁣	Pekka Takala⁣

==== Team Canada Senior ====
Team Canada Senior team competed in the 2016 World Ringette Championships. The 2016 Team Canada Senior team included the following:

CANADA SENIOR
Number	Name
Forwards
6	Kaitlyn Youldon
19	Paige Nosal
23	Kelsey Youldon
89	Dailyn Bell
91	Chantal St-Laurent
93	Jamie Bell
Centres
9	Shaundra Bruvall
18	Jacqueline Gaudet – Captain
17	Jennifer Hartley
99	Julie Blanchette – Assistant Captain
Defence
3	Jenna Debaji
5	Jacqueline Ho
12	Sydney Granger
13	Dallas Robbins
15	Paola Romeo
28	Christianne Varty – Assistant Captain
44	Elyssa Jasper
Goaltenders
31	Bobbi Mattson
33	Amy Clarkson
41	Jasmine Leblanc

Team Staff
Position	Name
Head coach	Barb Bautista
Assistant coach	Trina Janssens
Assistant coach	Sharolyn Wouters
Team Leader	Stephanie Laurin
Head Athletic Therapist	Connie Klassen
Mental Performance Consultant	Carl Nienhuis
Goalie Consultant	Keely Brown
Media and PR	Alayne Martell
Director of High Performance	Frances Losier

==== Team Sweden Senior ====
The 2016 Sweden Senior team included the following:

SWEDEN SENIOR
Number	Name
Forwards
3	Sarah Esmail Canada
4	Kajsa Frankenberg
6	Anna Norrbom
7	Tindra Sperling
8	Emilia Riikola
9	Jessica Alakärppä Finland
11	Wilma Frankenberg
16	Ellen Granath
18	Jennifer Peterback
21	Alma Lindqvist
24	Jessika Runolf
Centres
13	My Nilsson
19	Camilla LepistÃ
Defence
22	Rebecca Gustafson
Goaltenders
34	Rachelle Graham

Team Staff
Position	Name
Manager	Eva Frankenberg
Manager	Charoline Gustafson
Head coach	Eevi Kaasinen
Assistant coach	Rebecca Gustafson

==== Team USA Senior ====
The 2016 USA Senior team included the following:

USA SENIOR
Number	Name
Players
3	Moira Davidson
4	Chelsea Moore
5	Trish Sadoway
13	Brenda Rossetto
17	Tiffany Muylle
24	Carlye Thompson
37	Denise Berry
44	Haley Hill
Forwards
21	Taru Akesson
88	Britt Keline
Defence
6	Margie Carter
8	Kimberley Heacock
10	Heather Livingstone
14	Helen Olihant
18	Kasey Wheal
19	Sarah Nowak
Goaltenders
1	Tara Stevens
31	Jessica Dickin

==== Team Czech Republic Senior ====
The 2016 Czech Republic Senior team included the following:

CZECH REPUBLIC SENIOR

Pos.	Number	Name
Goalie	23	Veronika Hulkova
Goalie	32	Lenka Kobyláková
	5	Marie Pellarova
	8	Nina Beznoskova
	9	Tereza Bartosova
	10	Tereza Soukupova
	13	Anna Pokorna
	15	Dominique Rodrigue
	19	Dita Svobodová
	20	Petra Berankova
	22	Adela Srbova
	29	Kateřina Svobodová
	56	Kateřina Čapková
	63	Lenka Trubacova
	71	Tereza Bobkova
Team Staff
Manager		Dana Hůlková
Head coach		Jan Hulek
Assistant coach		Radek Dan
Trainer		Jean-Guy Rodrigue

=== Juniors ===
==== Team Finland Junior ====
The 2016 Team Finland Junior team included the following:

FINLAND JUNIOR (U19)
Number	Name
Forwards
5	Roosa Salonen
7	Niina Piiroinen
18	Laura Lyytikäinen
20	Hanna Ovaska
Centres
4	Fanni Elo
9	Miranda Uusi-Kämppä
11	Nelly Ahonen
13	Emmi Isaksson
19	Camilla Lepistö
21	Sara Tenhovaara
Defence
6	Milja Veilo
10	Laura Lahtinen
14	Fiia-Rebecca Impilä
15	Veera Lyytikäinen
16	Heidi Konttori
17	Emma-Julia Wood
Goaltenders
30	Erika Lampi
31	Sannamari Räty
32	Meini Kärnä

Team Staff
Position	Name
Manager	Liisa Kanninen
Head coach	Jouni Levander
Assistant coach	Niko Tuominen
Assistant coach	Matti Virtanen
Trainer	Jari Koski
Trainer	Katja Liukkonen

==== Team Canada Junior ====
The 2016 Team Canada Junior team included the following:

CANADA JUNIOR (U19)
Number	Name
Forwards
7	Jenny Snowdon
8	Justine Exner
9	Lauren Henderson
14	Molly Lewis
24	Kelsie Caine
29	Justine Lapointe
77	Britney Snowdon
89	Keyona Tomiuk
91	Sydney Nosal
Centres
2	Abby Richardson
5	Sarah-Lynne Begin (Assistant Captain)
96	Talia Gallant (Captain)
Defence
3	Annie Debaji
10	Robyn Gillespie
12	Chantal Gauthier
19	Erica Voss
20	Catherine Ruel
22	Samantha Renooy
97	Shae-Lynn Reaman (Assistant Captain)
Goaltenders
1	Ellen Hoban
31	Laurie St-Pierre
35	Ryann Bannerman

Team Staff
Position	Name
Head coach	Lorrie Horne
Assistant coach	Chris Belan
Assistant coach	Bryson Lamble
Legacy Coach	Danielle (Hobday) Hildebrand
Legacy Coach	Andrea Ferguson
Legacy Coach	Sarah (Miller) Ianni
Team Leader	Jackie Deschenes
Team Leader	Kathryn Pringle
Goalie Consultant	Claudia Jetté
Athletic therapist	Melinda Watson
Media and PR	Alayne Martell
Director of High Performance	Frances Losier

==== Team Sweden Junior ====
This was the first time Sweden sent a junior national ringette team to the World Ringette Championships. The 2016 Sweden Junior team included the following:

SWEDEN JUNIOR
Number	Name	Position
Players
1	Alexandra Väyrynen	
4	Kajsa Frankenberg	
7	Vania Rymell	
10	Reetta Nikkola	
11	Wilma Frankenberg	
15	Satu Holm	
16	Esther Eklund	
17	Emilia Riikola	
18	Jennifer Peterback	
20	Linnéa Helsing	
22	Elin Witick	
23	Matilda Karlsson	
30	Beatrice Varpula	Goaltender

Team Staff
Position	Name
Manager	Eva Frankenberg
Head coach	Eevi Kaasinen
Assistant coach	Jesper Hansen
Assistant coach	Arne Hörvallius
Assistant coach	Christer Jobs
Assistant coach	Lars Johnsson

== See also ==
- World Ringette Championships
- International Ringette Federation
- Canada national ringette team
- Finland national ringette team
- Sweden national ringette team
- United States national ringette team
- Czech Republic national ringette team
- Slovakia national ringette team

Preceded by North Bay 2013	World Ringette Championships; Helsinki; 2016 World Ringette Championships	Succeeded by Mississauga 2017
