= SM Ringette =

Finland's elite semi-professional ringette league

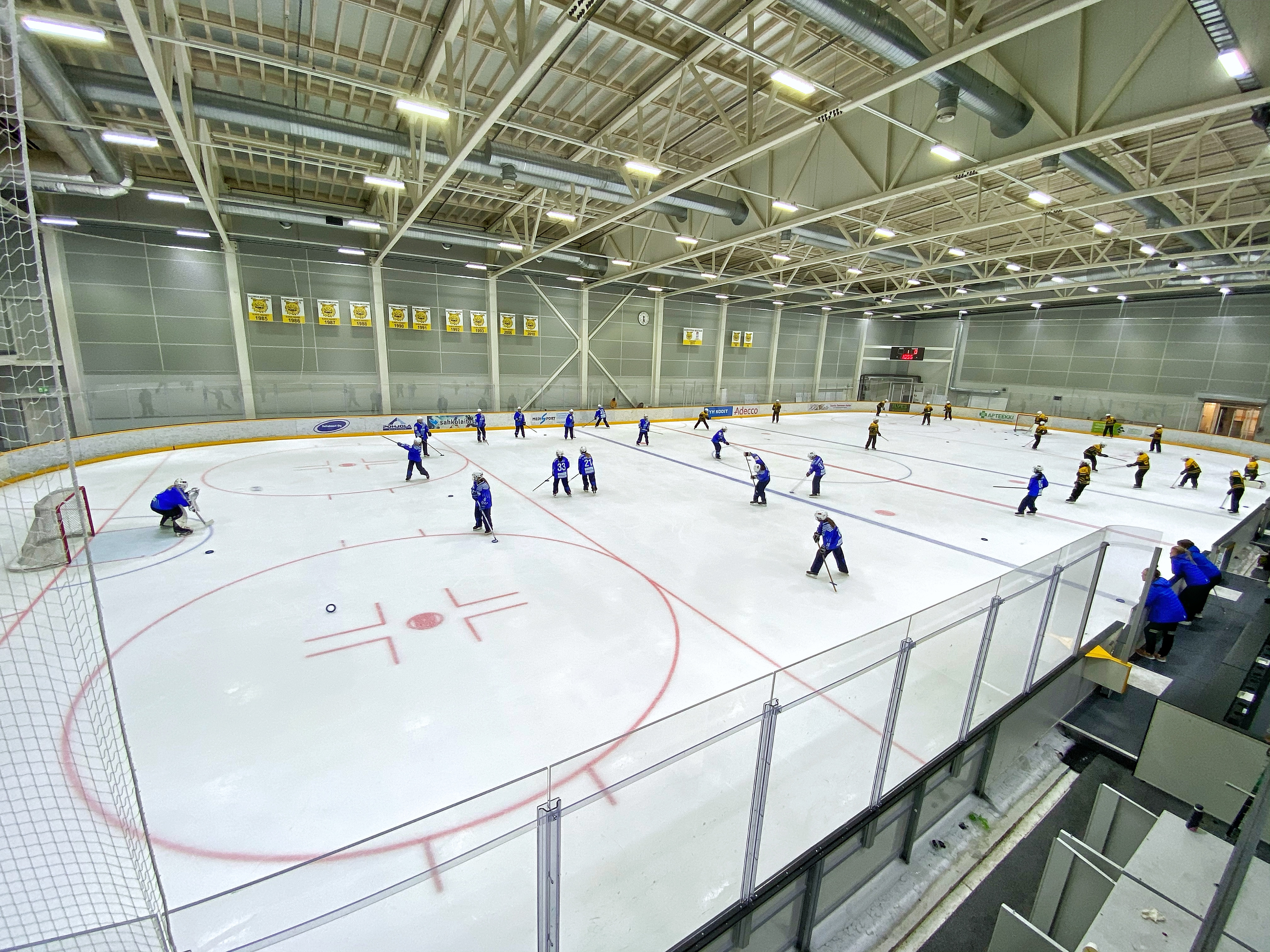
Finnish ringette teams warming up for a game in Finland's semi-pro league, SM Ringette, formerly known as Ringeten SM-sarja

SM Ringette, previously Ringeten SM-sarja, is the elite semi-professional ringette league in Finland's first division and its highest. The league features the best ringette players in Finland and is run by Ringette Finland. The league was known as Ringeten SM-sarja until it was rebranded in 2021 and is known as the "Finnish National Ringette League" by English speakers. The National Ringette League (NRL) is its Canadian equivalent.

The league has been in operation since the 1987–88 winter season and a number of its clubs competed in the Ringette World Club Championship when the international club tournament existed. Several of the league's players have played for the Finland national ringette team at the World Ringette Championships including Marjukka Virta, Anne Pohjola, and Susanna Tapani.

== Organization ==
SM-Ringette (formerly Ringeten SM-sarja) began operating during the 1987–88 winter season. Between 2013 and 2020, it was managed jointly by the Suomen Kaukalopallo- ja Ringetteliitto (SKRL ry) known in English as the "Finland Rinkball (Suomen Kaukalopalloliiton) and Ringette Association".

The SKRL was founded in November 2012 and started its operations at the beginning of 2013. In addition to Rinkball Finland and Ringette Finland, SKRL's founding members were the SM Ringette SM referees and the Kaukalopallo SM-Liiga ry. The federations of both sports decided to combine their resources due to falling registration rates as well as for financial reasons. When the new association was founded there were about 10,000 sports enthusiasts actively involved.

At the union's fall meeting in 2019, Finland's federal government was authorized to find conditions for dissolving the union. At the spring meeting on June 6, 2020, it was decided to dissolve the Suomen Kaukalopallo- ja Ringetteliitto ry on December 31, 2020, but both have since continued as two separate organizations.

== Awards and trophies ==
=== Agnes Jacks Trophy ===
The Agnes Jacks Trophy, named after the wife of Sam Jacks, is awarded to the league's Most Valuable Player at the end of the each season and was first awarded in 1992.

=== Jenni-Lysa Vehanen Trophy ===
Jenni-Lysa Vehanen is a retired Finnish ringette player who is widely considered to be one of the greatest players of all time in the sport. In honour of her accomplishments and contributions to the sport, the trophy for the top scorer in the Finnish National Ringette League is named after her. She played for several teams in Finland during the height of her career, including Angels Espoo, which was one of the most dominant teams in Finnish ringette during the 1990s and 2000s.

Throughout her career, Vehanen was a prolific scorer and won numerous awards and accolades for her achievements on the ice. She was a six-time Finnish national champion with Angels Espoo and was the leading scorer in SM Ringette, the Finnish National Ringette League, a record seven times.

After retiring from competitive play, Vehanen has remained involved in the sport as a coach, commentator, and ambassador. She is considered a pioneer in the sport of ringette, helping to elevate its profile in Finland and around the world, and inspiring young players to pursue excellence on the ice.

== Teams ==
The letters "Ry" which can sometimes be found at the end of the names of the Finnish league's ringette teams stand for "rekisteröity yhdistys" which is Finnish for "registered association". The term "Ry" is commonly seen in the names of non-profit organizations and clubs in Finland, indicating that they are officially registered entities in the country.

In the past, the league included the Hyvinkää Ringette, Luvian Kiekko −82, and Turun Ringet teams. VG-62 returned for the 2022–23 season.

=== Current ===
2023–24 is the league's 36th season with 12 teams.

Name	City	Titles
Tuusula Blue Rings	Tuusula	0 (Note: One of the founding teams, Tuusula Ringette, won six Finnish championships.)
Helsinki Ringette	Helsinki	1
Tampere Ilves (Lynx)	Tampere	0
Laitilan Jyske Ringette	Laitila	0
Espoon Kiekkoseura (Kiekko-Espoo)	Espoo	0
Lahti Ringette	Lahti	1
NoU_Ringette (NoU)	Nokia	5
Raision Nuorisokiekko (RNK Flyers)	Raisio	3
Luvian Kiekko −82 (LuKi-82)	Luvia	3
Forssan Palloseura (FOPS Ringette)	Forssa	0
Uudenkaupungin Jää-Kotkat (UJK) – (Ice Eagles of Uusikaupunki)	Uusikaupunki	0
Järvenpään Haukat (Hawks)	Järvenpää	0
VG-62	Naantali	6
Lapinlahden Luistin -89 (LL −89)	Lapinlahti, Pohjois-Savo	9
Vammalan Palloseura (VaPS Jäeliikunta)	Sastamala	0
Nurmijärvi Seven Ringettes (NSR)	Nurmijärvi	0

=== 2021–22 ===
2021–22 was the league's 34th season with 9 teams.

Name	City	Titles
Tuusula Blue Rings	Tuusula	0 (Note: One of the founding teams, Tuusula Ringette, won six Finnish championships.)
Helsinki Ringette	Helsinki	1
Tampere Ilves (Lynx)	Tampere	0
Laitilan Jyske Ringette	Laitila	0
Espoon Kiekkoseura (Kiekko-Espoo)	Espoo	0
Lahti Ringette	Lahti	1
NoU_Ringette	Nokia	5
Raision Nuorisokiekko (RNK Flyers)	Raisio	2
Luvian Kiekko −82 (LuKi-82)	Luvia	3

=== 2019-20 ===
2019-20 was the league's 32nd season with 8 teams. The championship was won by NoU Ringette, (Nokia Athletes).

Name	City	Titles
Helsinki Ringette	Helsinki	1
Hyvinkää Ringette	Hyvinkää	2
Lapinlahden Luistin -89	Lapinlahti, Pohjois-Savo	9
Espoon Kiekkoseura (Kiekko-Espoo)	Espoo	0
Lahti Ringette	Lahti	1
NoU_Ringette	Nokia	5
Raision Nuorisokiekko (RNK Flyers)	Raisio	2
Luvian Kiekko −82 (LuKi-82)	Luvia	3

== Team profiles ==
Lahti Ringette, Lahti Ringette, is an SM Ringette team based in the city of Lahti, which is located in the southern part of Finland. They have won several championships and many of their players have represented Finland on the international stage. Lahti's home arena is Isku Areena, formerly called, "Lahden Jäähalli", which is a modern ice rink that can hold up to 4,500 spectators.

Lapinlahden Luistin −89 Ry, (Lapinlahden Luistin -89), commonly referred to as "LL-89", is a ringette team that competes in Finland's National Ringette League. The team is based in the town of Lapinlahti, which is located in central Finland. The team is known for producing several quality players who've represented Finnish national teams at the international level.

LL-89 has a history of strong play in the Finnish Ringette League, and they have won multiple championships throughout their history. In addition to its competitive senior team, LL-89 has a junior program, which has produced many young players who have gone on to play at the senior level. The team's home arena is Kärpänen-halli, which is a modern ice rink that can hold up to 1,500 spectators.

== Team champions ==
- Lapinlahden Luistin -89: – 9 championships
- Tuusula Ringette: – 6 championships
- VG-62 (ringette): – 6 championships
- Luvian Kiekko −82: – 3 championships
- NoU_Ringette: – 5 championships
- Hyvinkää Ringette: – 2 championships
- Raision Nuorisokiekko RNK Flyers: – 3 championships
- Helsinki Ringette: – 1 championship
- Lahti Ringette: – 1 championship

== Season champions 1988– ==
- 1988 VG-62 (ringette)
- 1989 VG-62 (ringette)
- 1990 VG-62 (ringette)
- 1991 VG-62 (ringette)
- 1992 VG-62 (ringette)
- 1993 Lahti Ringette
- 1994 Tuusula Ringette
- 1995 Hyvinkää Ringette
- 1996 Tuusula Ringette
- 1997 Hyvinkää Ringette
- 1998 Tuusula Ringette
- 1999 Tuusula Ringette
- 2000 Tuusula Ringette
- 2001 Tuusula Ringette
- 2002 Lapinlahden Luistin -89
- 2003 Lapinlahden Luistin -89
- 2004 Luvian Kiekko −82
- 2005 Luvian Kiekko −82
- 2006 VG-62 (ringette)
- 2007 Luvian Kiekko −82
- 2008 Helsinki Ringette
- 2009 Lapinlahden Luistin -89
- 2010 Lapinlahden Luistin -89
- 2011 Raision Nuorisokiekko
- 2012 Lapinlahden Luistin -89
- 2013 Lapinlahden Luistin -89
- 2014 Lapinlahden Luistin -89
- 2015 NoU_Ringette
- 2016 NoU_Ringette
- 2017 Raision Nuorisokiekko
- 2018 Lapinlahden Luistin -89
- 2019 NoU_Ringette
- 2020 NoU_Ringette
- 2021 Lapinlahden Luistin -89
- 2022 NoU_Ringette
- 2022–23 RNK Flyers, Raision Nuorisokiekko

== Notable people ==
=== Players ===
- Marjukka Virta
- Anne Pohjola
- Susanna Tapani

=== Coaches ===
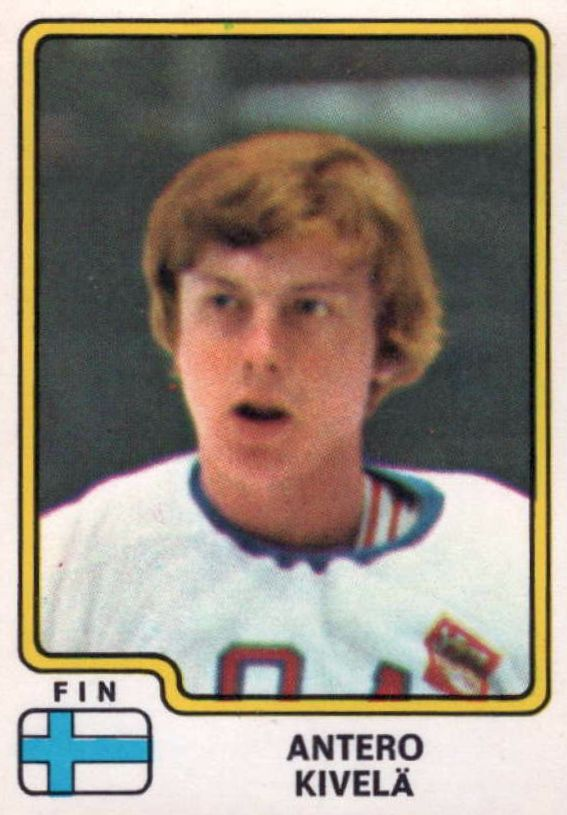
Kivelä, former Team Finland ice hockey goalie; coached in Finland's semi-pro ringette league, SM Ringette

Notable among notable coaches is Antero Simo Tapani Kivelä. Kivelä is a retired Finnish ice hockey goaltender who played for Finland's national ice hockey team making 58 appearances overall, as well as appearing at the 1980 Winter Olympics. Kivelä coached several ringette teams in Finland's semi-professional ringette league, SM Ringette, after he finished his playing career in ice hockey. He was the head coach for ten seasons of ringette club, Luvian Kiekko -82 (a.k.a. LuKi-82).

== See also ==
- Ringette
- (Canada) National Ringette League (NRL)
- Ringette World Club Championship
- World Ringette Championships
- Finland national ringette team
- Marjukka Virta
- Anne Pohjola
- Susanna Tapani
