= Ringette World Club Championship =

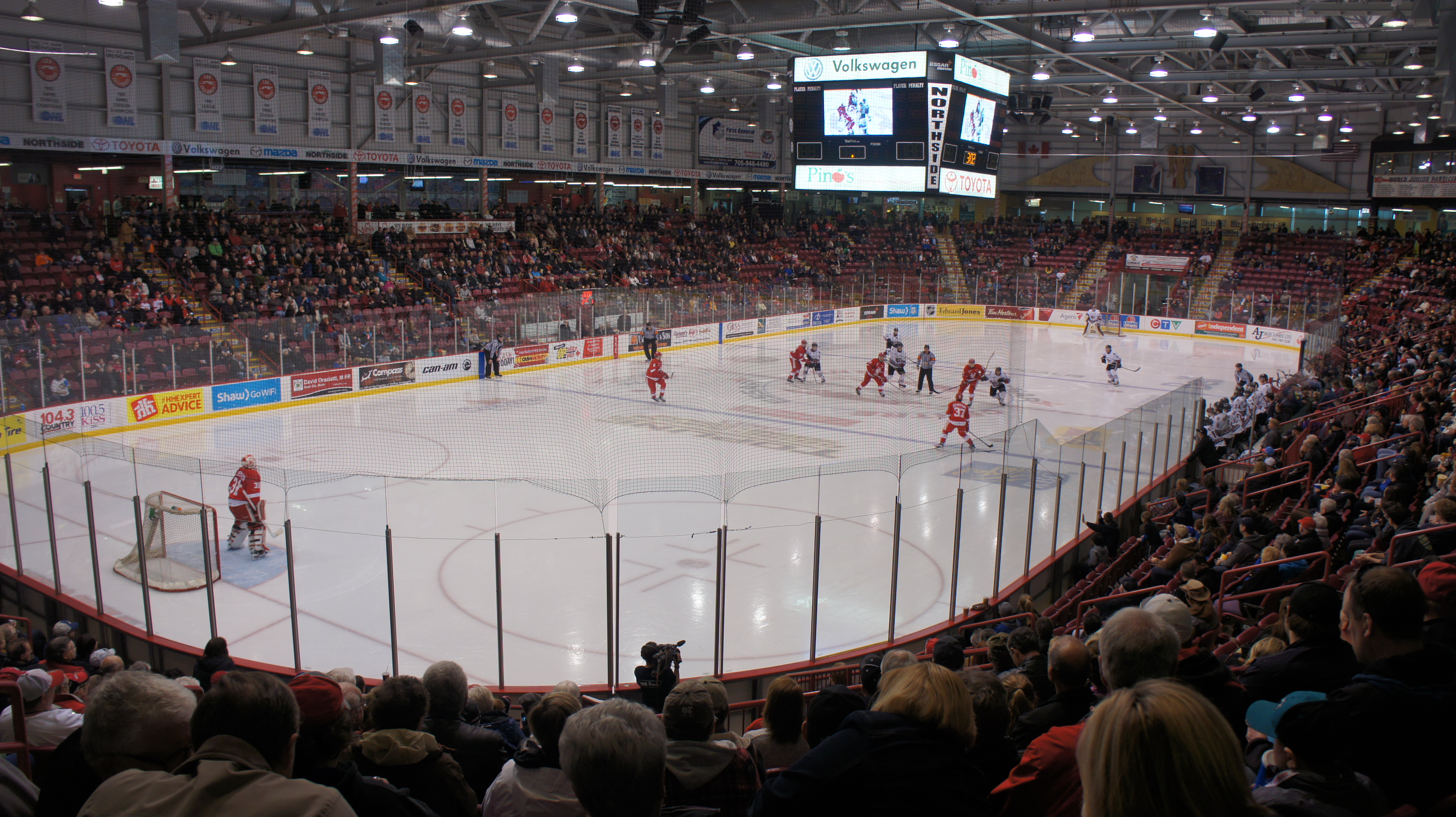
- The Essar Centre (now GFL Memorial Gardens) where the first RWCC took place.
- Status: No longer active
- Genre: International ringette club competition
- Location: Various
- Inaugurated: 2008; 18 years ago
- Most recent: 2012; 14 years ago
- Participants: 2008: 6 teams 2011-2012: 6 teams
- Organizer: IRF
- Last champions (Finland) Lapinlahden Luistin -89 (2011)

The Ringette World Club Championship (RWCC) was an international ringette competition organized by the International Ringette Federation (IRF). It featured the top teams from Canada's National Ringette League (NRL), Finland's Ringeten SM–Sarja (now called "SM Ringette"), and Sweden's Ringette Dam-SM. The World Club Championship was only held twice, the first time in 2008 and the last time in 2011.

In 2013 the IRF cancelled the 2014 Championship which was planned to be organized in Sweden. After the original two international tournaments, the club competition was discontinued due to financial difficulties preventing teams from participating.

== Clubs ==
Competing clubs came from Finland, Canada, and Sweden.

Clubs
Country	League	Clubs
Finland	Ringeten SM–Sarja	Espoon Kiekkoseura
Finland	Ringeten SM–Sarja	Luvian Kiekko -82
Finland	Ringeten SM–Sarja	Lapinlahden Luistin -89
Finland	Ringeten SM–Sarja	Raision Nuorisokiekko
Canada	National Ringette League	Cambridge Turbos
Canada	National Ringette League	Montreal Mission
Canada	National Ringette League	Calgary RATH
Canada	National Ringette League	Richmond Hill Lightning
Sweden	Ringette Dam-SM	Ulriksdals SK Ringette

== Results (2008–2014) ==
Year	Location	Gold	Silver	Bronze
2008 Details	Canada: Sault Ste. Marie	Canada; Cambridge Turbos	Finland; Luvian Kiekko -82)	Finland; Espoon Kiekkoseura Canada; Calgary RATH
2011 Details	Finland: Turku	Finland; Lapinlahden Luistin -89	Finland; Raision Nuorisokiekko	Finland; Luvian Kiekko -82
2014 Details	Sweden: Stockholm	cancelled		

== 2008 Ringette World Club Championship ==
The First World Championship of Ringette Clubs took place in Sault Ste. Marie, Ontario, Canada and began on November 5, 2008. The tournament was hosted by the Cambridge Turbos. The first game took place at the Essar Centre, an ice hockey arena now called GFL Memorial Gardens.

The international competition involved six of the world's best ringette clubs: four teams from the elite Canadian National Ringette League (NRL) and two teams from the elite Finnish ringette league, Ringeten SM–Sarja, participated. The teams from the NRL included the Cambridge Turbos, Montreal Mission, Calgary RATH, and the Richmond Hill Lightning. The teams from SM-Sarja included Espoon Kiekkoseura (EKS-Espoo) and Luvian Kiekko -82 (LuKi-82 Luvia).

=== Venue ===
Essar Centre
Capacity:
Ice Hockey: 4,928
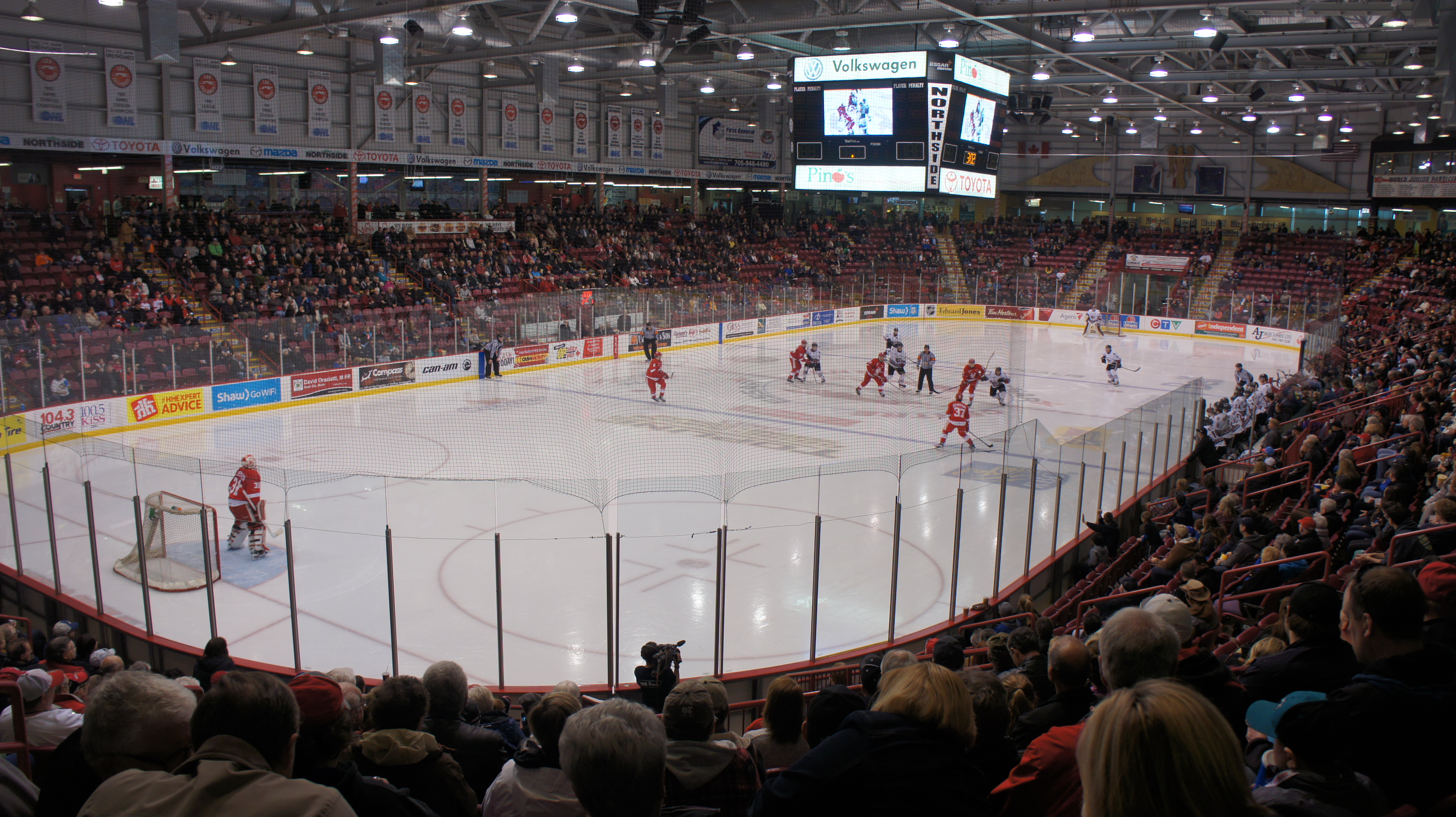
Canada – Sault Ste. Marie

=== Results ===
Results for the 2008 Ringette World Club Championship were as follows:

- Gold: Cambridge Turbos

(5 games) 5 wins

- Silver: Luvian Kiekko -82
  (LuKi-82)

(5 games) 3 wins | 2 losses

- Bronze: Calgary RATH,

2 wins | 2 lost

- 4th: Espoon Kiekkoseura (EKS-Espoo)

(4 games) 1 win

- 5th: Montreal Mission

(4 games) 1 win

- 6th: Richmond Hill Lightning

== 2011 Ringette World Club Championship ==
The second and final Ringette World Club Championships were held at the Kupittaa Ice Arena in Turku, Finland from Tuesday, December 27, 2011 to Sunday, January 1, 2012. Canada was represented by two teams: the Richmond Hill Lightning and the world champion of ringette clubs, the Cambridge Turbos. Three clubs represented Finland: Lapinlahden Luistin -89 (LL -89), Luvian Kiekko -82 (LuKi -82), and Raision Nuorisokiekko (RNK Flyers). The Swedish club, Ulriksdals SK Ringette, also participated in the international tournament.

In the semi-final, LL -89 overcame the Cambridge Turbos, 3–1. The Championship Finale consisted entirely of Finnish clubs where team LL -89 went up against the RNK Flyers for gold medal. LL -89 beat the RNK Flyers, 5–4, to win the golden medal. Tiina Randell scored the winning goals. The Most Valuable Player of the tournament was Anne Pohjola of LL -89.

=== Venue ===
Kupittaa Ice Arena
(Kupittaan jäähalli)
(now "Rajupaja Areena")
Capacity:
Ice Hockey: 3,000
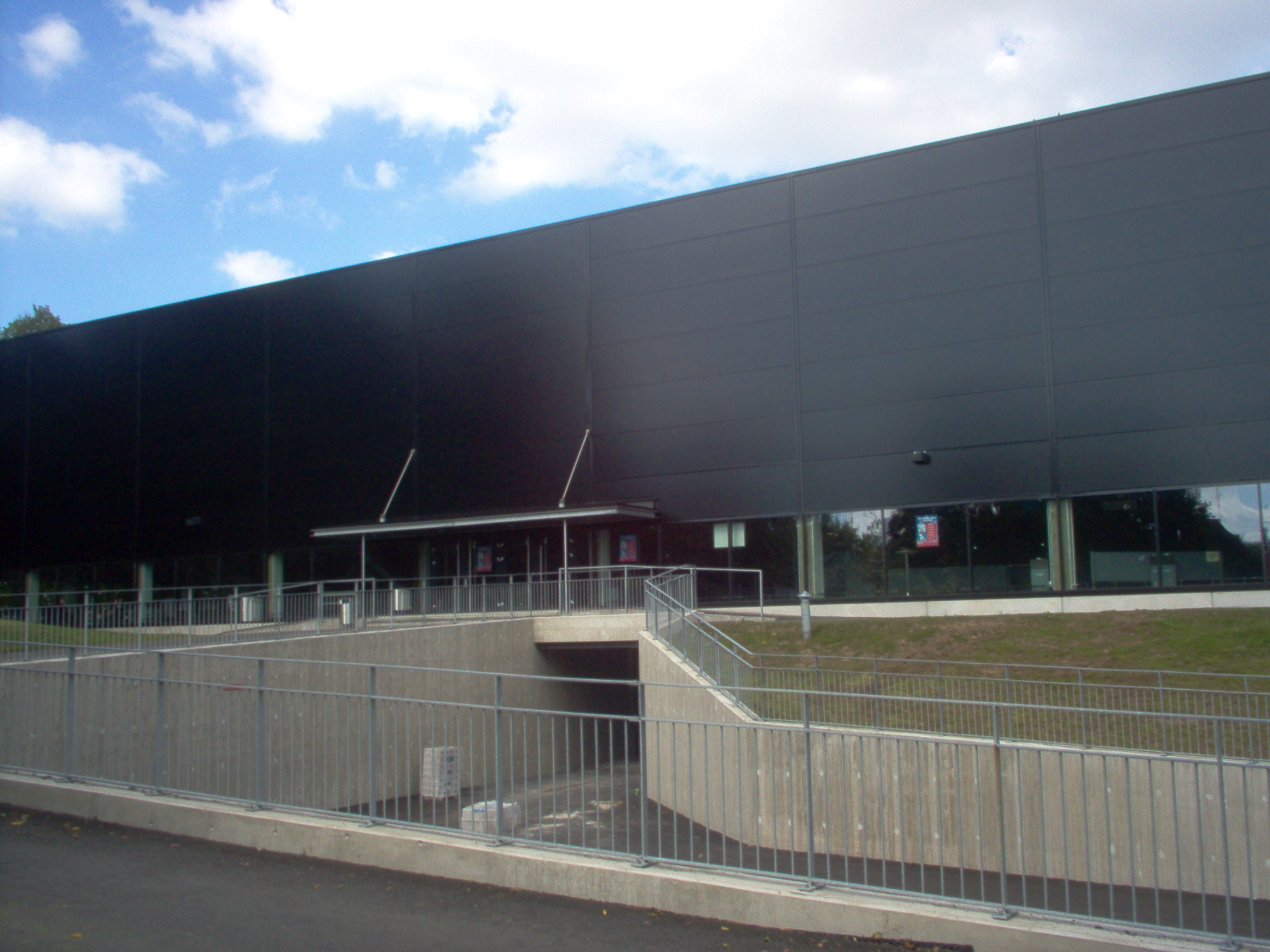
Finland – Turku

=== Results ===
Results for the 2011 Ringette World Club Championship were as follows:

- Gold: Lapinlahden Luistin -89 LL -89
- Silver: Raision Nuorisokiekko RNK Flyers
- Bronze: Luvian Kiekko -82 LuKi-82
- 4th: Cambridge Turbos
- 5th: Richmond Hill Lightning
- 6th: Ulriksdals SK Ringette

== 2014 Ringette World Club Championship ==
In 2013 the International Ringette Federation (IRF) cancelled the 2014 Ringette World Club Championship which initially had been planned to be organized in Sweden.
