= International Ringette Federation =

International sports governing body organizing ringette

- Fédération Internationale de Ringuette
- Abbreviation: IRF
- Founded: 1991; 35 years ago
- Type: Sports federation
- Legal status: Governing body of Ringette
- Purpose: Sport governance
- Headquarters: Ottawa, Canada
- Region served: Worldwide
- Members: 6 members: Canada; Czech Republic; Finland; Slovakia; Sweden; United States
- Official languages: English
- President: Markku Koli
- Website: https://international-ringette-fed.squarespace.com/
- Formerly called: World Ringette Council

The International Ringette Federation (IRF) is a non-profit amateur sports organization and the highest governing body for the sport of ringette. Today the member countries of the IRF Board includes four member nations: Canada, Finland, Sweden, and the United States. Initially the organization was called the "World Ringette Council" (WRC), but was changed to the "International Ringette Federation" in 1991. The change is believed to have been made to avoid confusion with the organizing body and the new World Ringette Championships tournament which shared the same acronym, WRC.

The IRF is the organization responsible for administering the World Ringette Championships tournament, designed to provide a competition for the world's elite ringette players and help showcase the sport on the international stage. The inaugural year of the World Ringette Council's international ringette tournament, the World Ringette Championships, took place in Canada in 1990. Today the tournament is run by the IRF.

Historically, Canada and Finland have been the most active ambassadors in the International Federation. Canada and Finland regularly travel across various countries to demonstrate how ringette is played. Canadian teams have demonstrated in countries including Japan, Australia, Iceland, and New Zealand. The sport has also been introduced to Slovakia, Russia, Estonia, Hungary, the Czech Republic and Switzerland.

== History ==
Twenty-three years after the sport of ringette began in Canada, the first successful attempt to organize a group dedicated to the promotion and development of the sport internationally resulted in the creation of the World Ringette Council (WRC). The first international congress was held in Helsinki, Finland, in 1986 and was attended by representatives from five countries: Canada, Finland, Sweden, the United States and France. The sporting body was also determined to establish an elite level of international competition for ringette.

After the organization administered the first World Ringette Championship tournament in 1990, the World Ringette Council (WRC), the precursor to the IRF, changed its name to the International Ringette Federation in 1991, probably to avoid confusion due to the fact that it had the same acronym as the world event, the World Ringette Championships (WRC).

For a period of time a separate competition was organized for the Junior elite level of ringette, the World Junior Ringette Championships, but the competition has since discontinued as a separate tournament and has now merged with the World Ringette Championship as a whole. The organization also held the Ringette World Club Championship in 2008 and 2011 and had scheduled a tournament for 2014, but the tournament was discontinued due to financial reasons the competing clubs faced and is no longer active.

In 2012, the International Ringette Federation announced new promotional activities in Norway, Slovakia, as well as in South Korea.

=== Initial organization leaders (WRC) ===
The first meeting of the World Ringette Council was in 1986 and included attendees serving as representatives from the original five member countries: Canada, Finland, Sweden, the United States, and France. Ringette Canada's president at the time, Betty Shields, became the first President of the WRC. Antti Simola was the president of the Finnish Ringette Association, (now known as Ringette Finland) and became Vice-President. Canada's Wes Clark was chosen to serve as WRC Secretary, and Dale Friesen, and American, became Treasurer. Four people from the WRC's member countries composed the Board of Directors.

The World Ringette Council's (the IRF predecessor) leaders were as follows:

Initial organization leaders (WRC)
Position	Name
President	Betty Shields (Also the then president of Ringette Canada)
Vice President	(Finland) Antti Simola (Also the then president of the Finnish Ringette Association)
Secretary	Wes Clark
Treasurer	Dale Friesen
Board of Directors	Composed of four members, appointed from the member countries

== Member countries ==
Member countries today include Canada, Finland, Sweden, the United States, and the Czech Republic. Only Canada and Finland have had national offices with full-time staff.

Although France was initially represented in 1986 at the first meeting of the IRF predecessor, the World Ringette Council, to date the country has never formed a national governing body for the sport.

Member Countries
Member countries 2022
Country	National governing body	Location	Founded	Joined IRF
Canada	Ringette Canada	Ottawa	1974	1986
Finland	Suomen Ringetteliitto (Ringette Finland)	Helsinki	1983	1986
Sweden	Svenska Ringetteförbundet (Sweden Ringette Association)	Solna	1994	1986
USA	USA Ringette			1986
Czech Republic	(Czech: Česky Svas Ringetu) (Czech Ringette Association)		2016	2016
France	N/A			1986

=== Canada ===
The national governing body for the sport of ringette in Canada is Ringette Canada. The association's office is located in Ottawa. It joined the World Ringette Council (the International Ringette Federation's predecessor) in 1986.

=== Finland ===
The national governing body for the sport of ringette in Finland is Ringette Finland (Finnish: Suomen Ringetteliitto). The National Association of Ringette of Finland (Ringette Finland) was created in 1983. The association's office is located in Helsinki. It joined the World Ringette Council (the International Ringette Federation's predecessor) in 1986.

=== Sweden ===
The national governing body for the sport of ringette in Sweden is Sweden Ringette Association, (Swedish: Svenska Ringetteförbundet). It was formed in 1994 and was elected as an associate member of the Swedish Sports Confederation in 2003. The association's office is located in Solna. It joined the World Ringette Council (the International Ringette Federation's predecessor) in 1986.

=== USA ===
The two major national governing organizations for ringette in the USA are USA Ringette and Team USA Ringette. It joined the World Ringette Council (the International Ringette Federation's predecessor) in 1986.

=== Czech Republic ===
The national governing organizations for ringette in the Czech Republic is the Czech Ringette Association, (Czech: Česky Svas Ringetu). It joined the International Ringette Federation in 2016.

=== France ===
France was initially represented in 1986 at the first meeting of the IRF predecessor, the World Ringette Council. However, to date the country has never formed a national body for the sport. The country has had its national ringette teams compete at the World Ringette Championships in the past but has not done so since the 2012 World Junior Ringette Championships.

=== Slovakia ===
Ringette Slovakia joined the IRF in 2003. However. it is currently not a participant in the World Ringette Championships. Its most recent appearance was in Ringette World Club Championship in 2011.

== World Ringette Championships ==
The World Ringette Championships (abbreviated WRC) was held for the first time in Canada in 1990. The following year in 1991 the World Ringette Council changed its name to the International Ringette Federation (IRF) possibly to avoid confusion due to the fact that it had the same acronym as the world event. For a brief period of time a separate tournament for junior ringette players, the World Junior Ringette Championships was organized but has since merged with the senior world competition program.

=== Canada National Ringette Team ===
Canada is home to one of the leading national ringette teams in international play and has one of the most successful national ringette teams in the world. Canada selects two national ringette teams for international competition: one national junior team and one national senior team. Both teams compete in the World Ringette Championships tournament. Canadian teams compete in both the Junior Pool and the Senior Pool competitions. The national senior ringette team competes in the Senior Pool competition now known as the "Sam Jacks Series".

=== Finland National Ringette Team ===
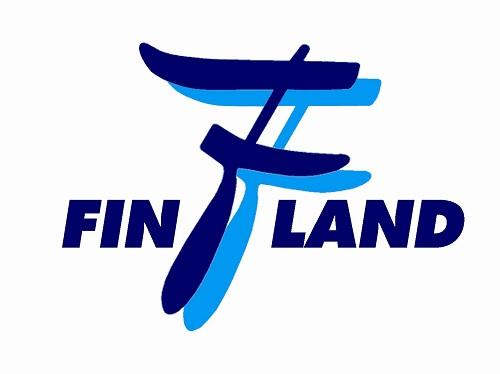
Finland's former national ringette team logo

Finland is home to one of the leading national ringette teams in international play and has one of the most successful national ringette teams in the world having won the most world titles in the senior division. Finland selects two national teams for the World Ringette Championships, one national senior team and one national junior team. Finland's national ringette teams compete in the World Ringette Championships tournament in both the Junior Pool and the Senior Pool competitions. The national senior ringette team competes in the Senior Pool competition now known as the Sam Jacks Series.

=== Sweden National Ringette Team ===
Sweden selects one or two national ringette teams for international competition to compete in the World Ringette Championships tournament in Junior and Senior age groups. Team Sweden currently competes in the President's Pool competition though a Junior Sweden team has competed at the World competition as well.

=== United States National Ringette Team ===
The United States selects one national ringette team for international competition to compete in the World Ringette Championships tournament. Team USA competes against Team Sweden, Team Czech Republic, and Team Slovakia in the President's Pool and occasionally Team Canada Junior and Team Finland Junior.

=== Czech Republic ===
The Czech Republic has competed regularly at the World Ringette Championships making its world debut at the 2016 World Ringette Championships with the Czech Republic national ringette team. The country has formed a national organization for ringette and is currently a full official member of the International Ringette Federation. Czechia currently only has a Senior national team and does not a have junior national representation and its national team competes in the President's Pool.

=== Slovakia ===
Slovakia has competed at the World Ringette Championships making its world debut at the 2016 World Ringette Championships with the Slovakia national ringette team but has not regularly appeared since. The country has formed a national organization for ringette and is currently a full official member of the International Ringette Federation. Slovakia only has a Senior national team and does not a have junior national representation and its national team competes in the President's Pool.

=== Other national ringette teams ===
==== France and Russia ====
France was initially represented in 1986 at the first meeting of the IRF predecessor, the World Ringette Council, but does not have member representation today. Russia has never had a representative body for the sport of ringette to date and neither country has formed a national governing body. The France national ringette team and the Russia national ringette team made their world debuts early in the beginning years of the World Ringette Championships.

In the past, both France and Russia both competed at the World Junior Ringette Championships, but only during the 2012 World Junior Ringette Championships in London, Ontario, Canada. This was the last year the junior event was held separately from the World Ringette Championships after which a new Junior division was created.

== Other tournaments ==
=== World Junior Ringette Championship ===
The World Junior Ringette Championships was a tournament in 2009 and 2012 organized by the International Ringette Federation (IRF) for elite international Junior ringette athletes but no longer functions as an event, having since merged with the World Ringette Championships where both Senior and Junior divisions now exist.

=== Ringette World Club Championship ===
The Ringette World Club Championship was an international ringette competition held in 2008 and 2011 and was organized by the International Ringette Federation. It featured the top teams of the Canadian National Ringette League, Finland's Ringeten SM-sarja (now called "SM Ringette") and Sweden's Ringette Dam-SM.
