= National Ringette League playoffs =

The National Ringette League playoffs are the knockout match, round robin, and tournament for determining the champion for National Ringette League (NRL).

The National Ringette League (NRL) playoffs began during the league's second season which was the 2005-06 season. In 2008, the NRL playoffs replaced the national championships for the Under-19 years and Open divisions at the Canadian Ringette Championships and have been conducted in this manner since.

The 2010–11 season introduced the new "NRL Championship Tournament" replacing the Championship qualifying rounds and takes place in just one city with the intention of allowing the league to create a media event and to hold attention. The top 10 teams in the league's regular season participate in the championship tournament crowning the team champion of the league. Starting in the 2011–12 season, 8 teams played a full round robin known as the "Elite Eight" to determine the champion.

== Format ==
The current format consists of three parts: Knockout match, Elite Eight, and Tournament.

1. Knockout Stage: the best-of-three match to determine which of the three Eastern conference teams and which one of the Western conference teams advance to the Elite Eight.
2. Elite Eight: the eight-team round robin matches. Each team plays seven games one time. These games began being held in one city starting in the 2011-12 season.
3. Championship Tournament: the semifinal and final. Second and third place teams in Elite Eight go to the semifinal, and the winner goes against the top team in Elite Eight.

== History ==
Season	Development
2005-06	NRL playoffs began during the league's second season
2008	The NRL playoffs replaced the national championships for the Under-19 years and Open divisions at the Canadian Ringette Championships and have been conducted in this manner ever since.
2010-11	The playoffs were held in just one city.
2011-12	The "Elite Eight" (a round-robin tournament) and the new "Championship Tournament" started. The NRL Championship Tournament replaced the Championship qualifying rounds.
2015-16	The number of teams in the Western conference became 4, and the Knockout stage consisted of five Eastern conference teams and three Western conference teams.
2016-17	The number of Western Conference teams became 5, but the number of teams advancing to the Elite Eight remained the same.
2025-2026	The number of Western Conference teams was 7 and the number of Eastern Conference Teams was 7.

== Final results ==
Year	Champion	Result	Runner-up
2011	Edmonton WAM!	4-2	Cambridge Turbos
2012	LMRL Thunder	7-2	Montréal Mission
2013	Calgary RATH	6-5	Prairie Fire
2014	Ottawa Ice	7-4	Cambridge Turbos
2015	Cambridge Turbos	6-2	Richmond Hill Lighting
2016	Cambridge Turbos	5-3	Gloucester Devils
2017	Cambridge Turbos	6-5	Atlantic Attack
2018	Atlantic Attack	5-3	Edmonton WAM!
2019	Calgary RATH	5-3	Atlantic Attack
2022	Calgary RATH	-	Edmonton WAM!

== Records ==
- All records are from 2011 playoffs.
- Stats updated as of end of 2018 playoffs.

=== Playoffs appearance ===
Team	Appearance	Knockout stage	Elite Eight	Semifinal	Final
Atlantic Attack	7	4	5(3)	0	2(2)
BC Thunder	4	2	2(2)	1	1(0)
Edmonton Black Gold Rush	2	2	2(0)	0	0(0)
Bourassa Royal	4	4	0(0)	0	0(0)
Calgary RATH	8	0	8(8)	2	1(0)
Cambridge Turbos	8	2	8(6)	5	5(2)
Edmonton WAM!	6	1	6(5)	3	2(1)
Gatineau Fusion	5	5	1(0)	0	0(0)
Gloucester Devils	7	7	5(0)	1	1(1)
Lac St. Louis Adrenaline	2	2	0(0)	0	0(0)
Manitoba Intact	2	2	1(0)	0	0(0)
Manitoba Jets	1	0	1(1)	0	0(0)
Montréal Mission	8	3	7(5)	0	1(1)
Ottawa Ice	8	8	6(0)	3	1(0)
Prairie Fire	3	0	3(3)	0	1(1)
Quebec City Cyclones	3	3	1(0)	0	0(0)
Richmond Hill Lighting	8	8	7(0)	1	1(0)
Rive-Sud Révolution	5	5	0(0)	0	0(0)
Waterloo Wildfire	6	6	3(0)	1	0(0)
Whitby Wild	1	1	0(0)	0	0(0)

=== Team records ===
- The overtime loss(es) will be counted as OTL in team records but not in final game records.

Team	GP	W	L	OTL	SL
Atlantic Attack	46	20	25	1	0
BC Thunder	22	11	9	2	0
Black Gold Rush	20	5	15	0	0
Bourassa Royal	10	2	7	0	1
Calgary RATH	61	32	27	2	0
Cambridge Turbos	72	53	16	3	0
Edmonton WAM!	50	32	16	2	0
Gatineau Fusion	9	1	8	0	0
Gloucester Devils	62	28	31	3	0
Lac St.Louis Adrenaline	5	1	4	0	0
Manitoba Intact	11	4	6	1	0
Manitoba Jets	7	0	6	0	1
Montréal Mission	57	28	27	2	0
Ottawa Ice	63	37	26	0	0
Prairie Fire	15	9	5	1	0
Quebec City Cyclones	13	4	9	0	0
Richmond Hill Lighting	69	39	28	1	1
Rive Sud Revolution	11	1	10	0	0
Waterloo Wildfire	39	15	23	1	0

=== Final game record ===
Team	GP	W	L	%	Most recent appearances	Most recent titles
Calgary RATH	2					2019
Atlantic Attack	2	1	1	.500	2018	2018
BC Thunder	1	1	0	1.000	2012	2012
Cambridge Turbos	5	3	2	.600	2017	2017
Calgary RATH	1	1	0	1.000	2013	2013
Edmonton WAM!	2	1	1	.500	2018	2011
Gloucester Devils	1	0	1	.000	2016	Never
Montréal Mission	1	0	1	.000	2012	Never
Ottawa Ice	1	1	0	1.000	2014	2014
Prairie Fire	1	0	1	.000	2013	Never
Richmond Hill Lighting	1	0	1	.000	2015	Never
