= Canadian Ringette Championships =

Ringette tournament in Canada

Canadian Ringette Championships (Championnats Canadien de Ringuette)
- Current season, competition or edition: 2023 Canadian Ringette Championships
- Sport: Ringette
- Founded: 1979; 47 years ago
- Country: Canada
- Most recent champions: U16: Team New Brunswick; U19: St. Alberta Mission (AB4 - Alberta); NRL: Edmonton WAM!
- Most titles: U16: Ontario (13); U19: Ontario (16); NRL: Cambridge Turbos (6)
- Website: 2023 Canadian Ringette Championships

Canadian Ringette Championships (French: Championnats Canadien d'Ringuette), sometimes abbreviated CRC, is Canada's annual premiere national ringette tournament for the best ringette players and teams in the country. It encompasses three age/class divisions: Under-16 (U16), Under-19 (U19) and the seasonal championship for Canada's National Ringette League (NRL). The competition is usually held in the month of April. The first CRC was held in Winnipeg, Manitoba, in 1979. The National Ringette League playoffs are the knockout match, round robin and tournament for determining the champion for National Ringette League.

The next CRC, the 2024 Canadian Ringette Championships, will take place in Dieppe, New Brunswick, from April 7 – April 13, 2024.

The most recent tournament, the 2023 Canadian Ringette Championships, was a 7-day event which took place in Regina, Saskatchewan, on April 9–15, 2023. National champions were decided in U16, U19 and National Ringette League divisions.

== Overview ==
The event is organized by Canada's national sporting organization for the sport of ringette called Ringette Canada. It should not be confused with the Canada Winter Games which is a separate national multi-sport event, though ringette is a part of the Canada Winter Games program.

The tournament serves two main important functions. The first is to organize several competitions for the best ringette teams from each of the different Canadian provinces from various competitive levels and determine the national ringette champions of Canada for the season. The second is to organize the final elite competition between qualifying teams from Canada's National Ringette League, (the highest level of the sport in Canada) and determine which elite ringette team is the best in Canada overall. The tournament also serves as ground for those scouting for Canadian ringette talent, especially for those in the National Ringette League and those scouting for talent for both the junior and senior Canadian national ringette teams.

== Divisions ==
There are three classes in this championship:

(Canada) U16 AA (Under 16 AA)
(Canada) U19 AA (Under 19 AA)
(Canada) National Ringette League (Semi-professional/showcase league)

== Awards ==
=== Sportsmanship ===
The Agnes Jacks True Sport Award for sportsmanship is given in each of the three divisions at the end of the championships.

=== U16 AA ===
The Ringette Canada Trophy is awarded to the Canadian U16 AA champions.

=== U19 AA ===
The Sam Jacks Memorial Trophy is awarded to the Canadian U19 AA champions in memory of Sam Jacks. It was first awarded to the winning team at the Canadian Ringette Championships in Winnipeg, Manitoba in 1979 and was donated by the city of North Bay, Ontario, the birthplace of ringette. It should not be confused with the Sam Jacks Trophy which is awarded to the world senior champions at the World Ringette Championships.

=== National Ringette League ===
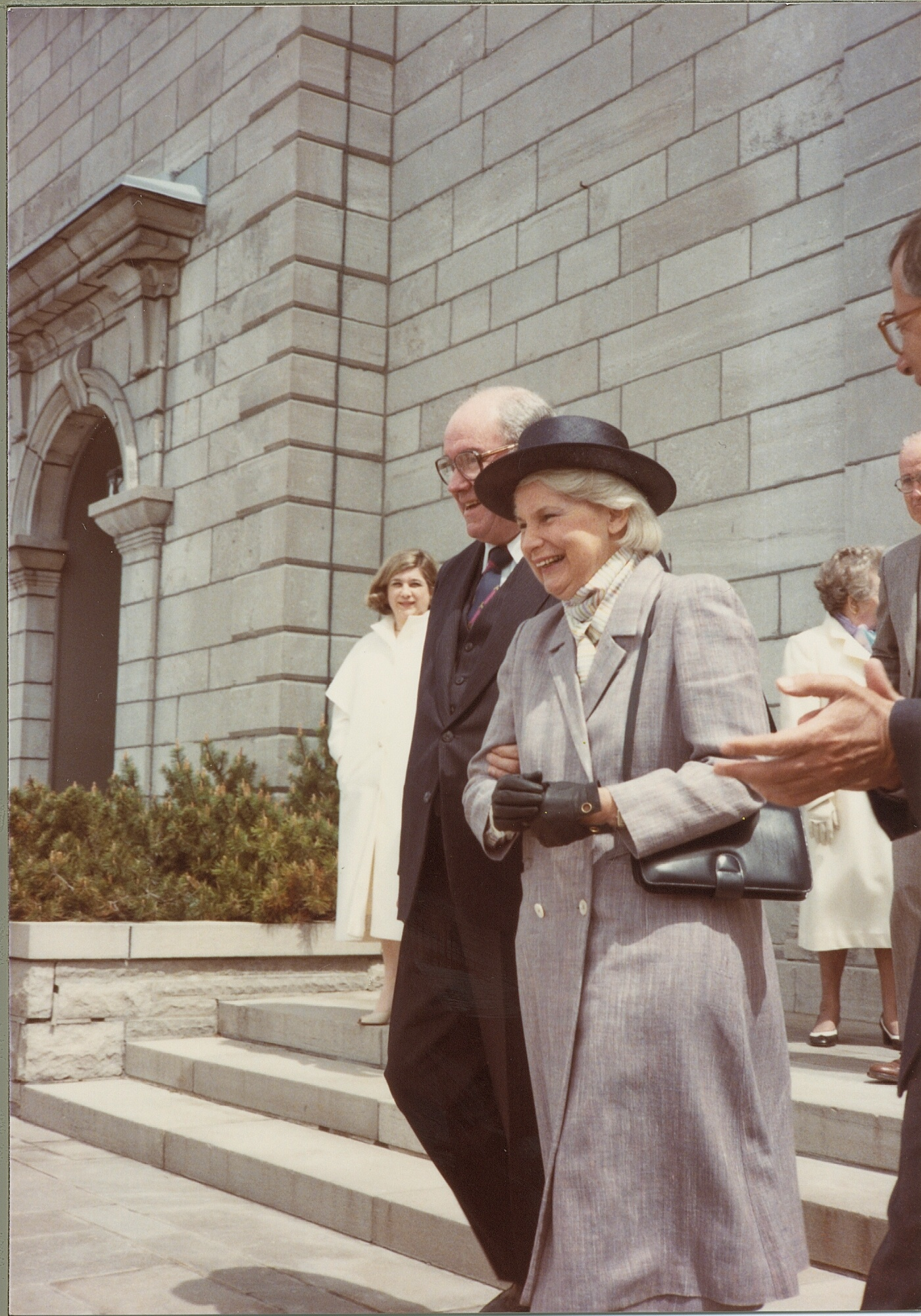
Jeanne Sauvé, Governor General of Canada, in 1984

The Jeanne Sauvé Memorial Cup is awarded to the National Ringette League champions in memory of the late Governor General of Canada. In December 1984, the trophy was first initiated as the Jeanne Sauvé Cup, then was first presented at the 1985 Canadian Ringette Championships in Dollard des Ormeaux, Québec. The Jeanne Sauvé Cup was established in 1985 by the then President of Ringette Canada, Betty Shields. After Sauvé's death in 1993, it was renamed the Jeanne Sauvé Memorial Cup.

== History ==
The first championship was held in Winnipeg, Manitoba. The event was held at the Keewatin Arena on Keewatin St. and Manitoba Avenue, from April 12 to 15, 1979. The first championship was commended by the then Prime Minister of Canada, Pierre Elliot Trudeau, in a letter from the Prime Minister's office which was included in the event pamphlet.

I am delighted to send my greetings to all those participating in the first National Championship of Ringette Canada being held in Winnipeg.

The active participation of female athletes across Canada has contributed not only to the changing of outdated public perception of the role of women in our society, but also the awakening of all Canadians to the importance of physical fitness.

Je tiens à vous féliciter et vous offre mes meilleurs voeux de succès lors de ces compétitions.

— Pierre Elliot Trudeau

The elite National Ringette League (NRL) champions compete annually at the Canadian Ringette Championships at the end of the NRL season, an event which first began in 2004.

== Champions ==
=== 1979 to 1992 ===
Canadian Ringette Champions (1979 to 1992)
Year	Host City	Junior	Belle	Deb
1979	Winnipeg	Ontario	Ontario	Kitchener
1980	Waterloo	Ontario	Ontario	Ontario
1981	Sudbury	Ontario	Ontario	Manitoba
1982	Dartmouth	Ontario	Ontario	Manitoba
1983	Sherwood Park	Ontario	Manitoba	Quebec
1984	Port Coquitlam	Ontario	Ontario	Quebec
1985	Dollard des Ormeaux	Ontario (Kitchener)	Manitoba (River East)	Manitoba (Transcona)
1986	Regina	Quebec	Manitoba	Alberta
1987	Kitchener	Ontario	Ontario	Manitoba
1988	Winnipeg	Saskatchewan	Alberta	Ontario
1989	Fredericton	Quebec	Ontario	Ontario
1990	Calgary	Alberta	Calgary	Calgary
1991	Hull	Ontario	Alberta	Ontario
1992	Port Coquitlam	Ontario	Ontario	Alberta

=== 1993 to 2000 ===
Canadian Ringette Champions (1993 to 2000)
Year	Host City	Junior	Belle	Deb	Intermediate
1993	Kitchener	Manitoba	Manitoba	Manitoba	Alberta
1994	Saskatoon	Alberta	Ontario	Ontario	Alberta
1995	Winnipeg	Alberta	Quebec	Manitoba	Alberta
1996	Gloucester	Ontario	Alberta	Alberta	Alberta
1997	Montreal	Manitoba	Alberta	Ontario	Alberta
1998	Edmonton	Ontario	Ontario	Alberta	Ontario
1999	Halifax	Alberta	Ontario	Ontario	Alberta
2000	Prince George	Alberta	Alberta	Ontario	Alberta

=== 2001 to 2019 ===
Canadian Ringette Champions (2001 to 2019)
Year	Host City	U16 (Junior)	U19 (Belle)	Open/NRL
2001	Moncton	Manitoba	Alberta	Alberta
2002	Regina	Alberta	Manitoba	Ontario
2003	Waterloo	Manitoba	Ontario	Alberta
2004	Calgary	Alberta	Ontario	Alberta; NRL: No championship match
2005	Winnipeg	Quebec	Alberta	Alberta; NRL: No championship match
2006	Longueuil	Quebec	Manitoba	Cambridge Turbos
2007	Halifax	Saskatchewan	Quebec	Edmonton WAM!
2008	St. Albert	Alberta (Host)	Ontario	Cambridge Turbos
2009	Charlottetown	Ontario	Alberta	Cambridge Turbos
2010	Saskatoon	Alberta	Ontario	Edmonton WAM!
2011	Cambridge	Alberta	Quebec	Edmonton WAM!
2012	Burnaby	New Brunswick (NB1, South East)	Ontario (St. Clement Rockets)	LMRL Thunder
2013	Fredericton	British Columbia (LMRL Thunder)	Ontario (Nepean Ravens)	Calgary RATH
2014	Regina	Ontario (Guelph Predators)	Manitoba (Winnipeg Magic)	Ottawa Ice
2015	Wood Buffalo	Manitoba (Bonivital Angels - BVRA)	Ontario (Nepean Ravens)	Cambridge Turbos
2016	London	Quebec (Laurentides)	Ontario (Guelph Predators)	Cambridge Turbos
2017	Leduc	New Brunswick (NB1)	Manitoba (Bonivital Angels - BVRA)	Cambridge Turbos
2018	Winnipeg	Manitoba (Bonivital Angels - BVRA)	Quebec (Laurentides)	Atlantic Attack
2019	Charlottetown & Summerside	Alberta (Calgary Core - AB4)	Ontario (Guelph Predators - ON1)	Calgary RATH

=== 2020 to present ===
Canadian Ringette Champions (2020 to present)
Year	Host City	U16 (Junior)	U19 (Belle)	NRL
2020	Ottawa	cancelled due to COVID-19 pandemic		
2021	No Host Announced	cancelled due to COVID-19 pandemic		
2022	Calgary	Team Alberta (AB1)	St. Alberta Mission (AB3)	Calgary RATH
2023	Regina	Team New Brunswick	St. Alberta Mission (AB4)	Edmonton WAM!

== See also ==
- 2018 Canadian Ringette Championships
