= 2018 National Ringette League playoffs =

The 2018 National Ringette League Playoffs are the postseason tournament of 2017-18 National Ringette League season.

The Atlantic Attack won their first national title.

== Format ==
The format is same as 2015-16. The draws are E3 vs E8, E4 vs E7, E5 vs E6 and W3 vs W4.

== Knockout stage ==
=== Eastern Conference ===
==== (3) Atlantic vs (8) Rive Sud ====
Game 1

17 March 2018
10:30am

Atlantic Attack	8–6 (3-2, 2-1, 3-1, 0-2)	Rive Sud Revolution
Caissie 3:35(1st), 7:45(2nd, PP); Snowdon, J 6:35(2nd), 3:19 (3rd); Proulx 0:47(1st); LeBlanc 10:31(1st); Snowdon, K 10:06 (3rd); Landry 10:44(3rd)		Larocque 9:00(1st), 12:44(1st), 7:01(2nd), 3:05(3rd), 7:52 (4th, PP); Claudine 2:08(4th)

Byron Dobson Memorial Arena, Riverview, New Brunswick
Attendance: 175

Atlantic leads the series 1-0

Game 2

17 March 2018
6:00pm

Atlantic Attack	8–10 (0-2, 3-2, 2-2, 3-4)	Rive Sud Revolution
Caissie 0:33(2nd, PP), 10:19(3rd), 0:09(4th, PP); Snowdon, B 12:28(2nd), 3:44(4th); Snowdon, J 5:54(3rd, PP), 6:26(4th); Doiron 3:40(2nd)		Larocque 9:11(3rd), 11:50(3rd, SH), 1:51(4th), 3:04(4th), 12:40 (4th); Justine 12:15(2nd), 8:05(4th, SH); Claudine 7:00(1st); Camille 8:00(1st); Laura 3:31(2nd)

Arena Eugene Leblanc, Memramcook, New Brunswick
Attendance: 250
Referee: Marco Mallet, Luc Melanson

Series ties at 1-1

Game 3

18 March 2018
10:00am

Atlantic Attack	13–0 (2-0, 3-0, 3-0, 5-0)	Rive Sud Revolution
Snowdon, J 10:15(1st, PP), 0:27(4th, PP), 12:07(4th, SH); Caissie 11:18(1st), 6:23(2nd), 4:51 (3rd); Proulx 2:16(2nd, PP), 8:42(4th); Landry 11:52(2nd), 9:38(3rd); Snowdon, K 5:54(3rd), 6:25(4th); Doiron 5:05(4th, PP)

Arena Eugene Leblanc, Memramcook, New Brunswick
Attendance: 260
Referee: David Jones, Luc Melanson

Atlantic wins the series 2-1

==== (4) Gatineau vs (7) Ottawa ====
Game 1

17 March 2018
10:00am

Gatineau Fusion	8–6 (3-3, 2-2, 1-0, 2-1)	Ottawa Ice
St-Laurent 4:06(1st), 10:25(2nd), 4:01(3rd, PP); Youldon 9:59(1st); Chenier 10:54(1st, PP); Plouffe 8:56(2nd); Rajaobelina 2:44 (4th); Biewald 5:48(4th)		Banning 3:01(1st); Begin 6:57(1st); MacDonald 10:59(1st); Hartley 0:01(2nd); Simzer 11:02 (3rd); Lewis 4:53(4th)

Arena Baribeau, Gatineau, Quebec
Referee: Natalie Fortin, Norman LaForest

Gatineau leads the series 1-0

Game 2

18 March 2018
11:00am

Gatineau Fusion	11–8 (3-0, 1-0, 5-5, 2-3)	Ottawa Ice
St-Laurent 4:16(1st), 4:46(1st), 0:34(3rd), 2:55(3rd), 5:32(3rd); Biewald 2:01(3rd), 7:39(3rd, PP), 12:54(4th); Chenier 10:29(1st); Barrette 6:22(2nd, PP); Youldon 2:58(4th)		Simzer 0:21 (3rd, PP), 5:04(3rd); Begin 8:03(3rd), 5:38(4th); Lewis 11:43(3rd, PP), 10:05(4th); MacDonald 0:46(3rd); MacAdam 7:49(4th, SH)

Aréna Campeau, Gatineau, Quebec
Attendance: 95
Referee: Danielle Lalonde, Natalie Fortin

Gatineau wins the series 2-0

==== (5) Richmond Hill vs (6) Waterloo ====
Game 1

17 March 2018
10:45am

Richmond Hill Lighting	6–2 (3-1, 1-0, 1-0, 1-1)	Waterloo Wildfire
Reaman 2:08(1st); Reynolds 4:34(1st); Stinson 5:15(1st); Simone 0:14 (2nd); Voss 6:53(3rd); Gibson 0:30(4th)		Youldon 4:19(1st), 11:54(4th)

Tom Graham Arena, Richmond Hill, Ontario
Attendance: 45
Referee: Lorie Grant, Robert Drury

Richmond Hill leads the series 1-0

Game 2

17 March 2018
6:00pm

Richmond Hill Lighting	3–4 (1-0, 1-1, 0-2, 1-1)	Waterloo Wildfire
Barbosa 3:06(1st); Simone 10:21(2nd); Hurren 7:39(4th)		Youldon 5:49(2nd), 12:49(3rd, PP); Kiviaho 2:31(3rd), 4:55(4th)

Ed Sackfield Arena, Richmond Hill, Ontario
Attendance: 67
Referee: Robert Drury, Becky Jameson

Series ties at 1-1

Game 3

18 March 2018
11:25am

Richmond Hill Lighting	4–2 (0-2, 2-0, 2-0, 0-0)	Waterloo Wildfire
Voss 0:47(2nd), 1:50(2nd); Richardson 6:27(3rd, SH); Gauthier 8:23(3rd)		Kiviaho 4:45(1st); Markle 5:26(1st)

Tom Graham Arena, Richmond Hill, Ontario
Attendance: 62
Referee: Brent Bunting, Robert Drury

Richmond Hill wins the series 2-1

=== West Conference ===
==== (3) Manitoba vs (4) BC ====
Game 1

10 March 2018
1:17pm

Manitoba Intact	8–3 (1-1, 1-0, 4-2, 2-0)	BC Thunder
Graves 6:19(1st), 3:35(2nd), 2:48(3rd, PP); Biebrick 5:00(3rd), 7:35(3rd), 2:02(4th); Sarahs 1:25 (3rd), 11:51(4th)		Naakka 9:53(1st), 10:32(3rd); Ojaranta 3:30(3rd)

Seven Oaks Arena, Winnipeg, Manitoba
Attendance: 410

Manitoba leads the series 1-0

Game 2

10 March 2018
7:00pm

Manitoba Intact	7–5 (2-2, 2-1, 2-0, 1-2)	BC Thunder
Pacholek 8:25(1st), 5:31(4th); Wotherspoon, K 5:07(1st); Gallant 3:14 (2nd, PP); Lutz 11:00(2nd, PP); Sarahs 7:30(3rd); Wotherspoon, J 8:35(3rd)		Naakka 7:49(1st), 12:35(1st), 7:05(4th); Cichos 1:03(2nd); Tajbakhsh 9:52(4th)

Seven Oaks Arena, Winnipeg, Manitoba
Attendance: 390

Manitoba wins the series 2-0

== Elite Eight ==
- x indicates clinches semifinal.
- y indicates clinches final directly.

All games will play at Bell MTS Iceplex, Seven Oaks Arena and Bell MTS Place which located at Winnipeg from April 9 to April 13.

	GP	W	L	OTL	PTS	GF	GA
y-Atlantic Attack	7	6	1	0	12	58	34
x-Cambridge Turbos	7	5	1	1	10	35	28
x-Edmonton WAM!	7	5	2	0	10	42	28
Calgary RATH	7	3	4	0	6	39	36
Richmond Hill Lightning	7	3	4	0	6	39	56
Montreal Mission	7	2	4	1	4	37	49
Gatineau Fusion	7	2	3	2	4	49	57
Manitoba Intact	7	2	4	1	4	39	50

== Semifinal ==
13 April 2018

Cambridge Turbos	2–4 (0-0, 1-1, 0-1, 1-2)	Edmonton WAM!
Gaudet 12:53(2nd); Adams 12:42 (4th)		Gautier 6:51(2nd, PP), 12:07(4th, EN); Bell, J 1:29(3rd); Bell, D 9:32(4th)

Seven Oaks Arena, Winnipeg, Manitoba
Attendance: 0

Edmonton goes to the final

== Final ==
14 April 2018

Atlantic Attack	5–3 (2-1, 1-1, 1-0, 1-1)	Edmonton WAM!
Snowdon, J 10:45(1st, PP), 0:28(2nd, PP), 8:11(4th, PP); Caissie 4:36 (1st); Snowdon, B 5:38(3rd, PP)		Brown 7:19(1st); Tomiuk 2:54(2nd); Dreger 11:42(4th, SH)

Bell MTS Place, Winnipeg, Manitoba
Attendance: 0

== Leaders ==
- Player except goalie
  - Goal
    - East: Martine Caissie (25, ATL)
    - West: Justine Exner (12, CGY)
  - Assist
    - East: Kaitlyn Youldon (23, GAT)
    - West: Dailyn Bell (17, EDM)
  - Point
    - East: Martine Caissie (42, ATL)
    - West: Dailyn Bell (24, EDM)
- Goalie
  - Saving %
    - East Jessie Callander (.914, CAM)
    - West Bobbi Mattson (.887, CGY)
  - Goals against average
    - East Jessie Callander (3.00, CAM)
    - West Breanna Beck (3.89, EDM)
  - Win
    - East Karine Doiron (7, ATL)
    - West Breanna Beck (5, EDM)
