= 2014–15 National Ringette League season =

- League: National Ringette League
- Sport: Ringette
- Duration: September 27, 2014 – March 1, 2015; March 7 – April 4 (playoff)
- Games: East: 28; West: 22
- Teams: 14

Regular season
- Season champions: East: Cambridge Turbos; West: Edmonton WAM!
- Season MVP: Chantal St- Laurent (GAT)

League Playoffs

Final
- Champions: Cambridge Turbos (4th title)

National Ringette League seasons
- ← 2013–14 2015–16 →

The 2014–15 National Ringette League season for the soort of ringette was the 11th season of the National Ringette League and began on September 27, 2014 and ended on March 1, 2015.

Cambridge Turbos won their 4th title and became the team which wins the most championship in National Ringette League history.

== Teams ==
A team rejoined the National Ringette League this season.

- BC Thunder:West Division

Two teams did not join the league for two straight seasons.

- Quebec City Cyclones
- Prairie Fire

== Regular seasons ==
East Division teams would play 28 games which consisted 1 to 4 games against same division team and some of those team will played against West Division teams 1, 2 or 4 games.

West Division teams would play 22 games which consisted 7 games against same division team and play 1, 2 or 4 game against East Division teams.

== Development ==
The National Ringette League introduced a new 3-referee officiating system.

== Standings ==
- x indicates clinches the playoff
- y indicates clinches the Championship (Elite Eight)

=== East Conference ===
	GP	W	L	SL	PTS
y-Cambridge Turbos	28	24	2	2	50
x-Ottawa Ice	28	21	7	0	42
y-Montreal Mission	28	20	7	1	41
x-Gloucester Devils	28	17	9	2	36
x-Richmond Hill Lightning	28	17	11	0	34
x-Waterloo Wildfire	28	14	14	0	28
x-Le Royal de Bourassa	28	12	15	1	25
x-Lac St.Louis Adrenaline	28	11	14	3	25
x-Atlantic Attack	28	11	16	1	23
x-Gatineau Fusion	28	5	23	0	10
Rive-Sud Révolution	28	1	27	0	2

=== West Conference ===
	GP	W	L	SL	PTS
y-Edmonton WAM!	22	15	7	0	30
y-Calgary RATH	22	12	8	2	26
BC Thunder	22	7	13	2	16

== Playoffs ==
- Ottawa, Gloucester, Richmond Hill and Waterloo win the series in the knockout stage and go to the elite eight.
- In the Elite eight, Cambridge finished the round robin first place and went to the final. Edmonton and Richmond Hill went to semifinal.
- In the semifinal, Richmond Hill beat the Edmonton to the final but lost to Cambridge.
- Cambridge beat the Richmond Hill 6–2 to win the fourth title.

== Award ==
- MVP: Chantal St-Laurent (GAT)

== Leaders ==
=== Regular season ===
- Player except goalie
  - Goal
    - East: Chantal St-Laurent (75, GAT)
    - West: Dailyn Bell (24, EDM)
  - Assist
    - East: Julie Blanchette (81, MTL)
    - West: Dailyn Bell (28, EDM)
  - Point
    - East: Julie Blanchette (126, MTL)
    - West: Dailyn Bell (52, EDM)
- Goalie
  - Saving %
    - East Jessie Callander (.911, CAM)
    - West Amy Clarkson (.913, BC)
  - Goals against average
    - East Meghan Pittaway (3.01, CAM)
    - West Breanna Beck (2.97, EDM)
  - Win
    - East Jasmine LeBlanc (17, GLO)
    - West Bobbi Mattson (10, CGY)
