= 2017–18 National Ringette League season =

- League: National Ringette League
- Sport: Ringette
- Duration: September 30, 2017-March 12, 2018; March 10, 2018-April 14, 2018 (playoff)
- Games: East: 22; West: 24
- Teams: 15

Regular season
- Season champions: East Conference: Red Division: Cambridge turbos (1st overall); White Division: Montreal Mission (2nd overall); West Conference: Calgary RATH
- Season MVP: Shaundra Bruvall

League Playoffs

Final
- Champions: Atlantic Attack (1st title)

National Ringette League seasons
- ← 2016–17 2018–19 →

The 2017–18 National Ringette League season for the sport of ringette was the 14th season of the National Ringette League and began on September 30, 2017 and ended on April 14, 2018.

The Atlantic Attack won the national championship and their first national title by defeating the Edmonton WAM! 5–3.

== Teams ==
Gloucester Devils did not play for the season.

== Regular seasons ==
For East division red teams, they play 4 games each to 2 teams from the same color and 2 game each to 3 teams from the same color. They also play 2 games to 4 white color teams.

For East division white teams, they play 3 games each to same color team and 2 games each to 5 red color teams.

For West division team, they play 6 games each to same division teams.

The number of home games and that of away games may not be the same.

== Standings ==
- d indicates clinches the Division and the Championship (Elite Eight)
- x indicates clinches the playoff
- y indicates clinches the Conference and the Championship (Elite Eight)

=== East Conference ===
	GP	W	L	SL	PTS
yd-Cambridge Turbos	22	19	2	1	39
yd-Montreal Mission	22	18	3	1	37
x-Atlantic Attack	22	17	4	3	35
x-Gatineau Fusion	22	12	8	2	26
x-Richmond Hill Lighting	22	11	7	4	26
x-Waterloo Wildfire	22	9	9	4	22
x-Ottawa Ice	22	9	10	3	21
x-Rive Sud Revolution	22	7	15	0	14
Lac St.Louis Adrenaline	22	5	16	1	11
Le Royal de Bourassa	22	3	19	0	6

=== West Conference ===
	GP	W	L	SL	PTS
y-Calgary RATH	24	19	4	1	39
y-Edmonton WAM!	24	16	6	2	34
x-Manitoba Intact	24	12	10	2	26
x-BC Thunder	24	10	13	1	21
Black Gold Rush	24	3	18	3	9

== Awards ==
- MVP: Shaundra Bruvall (CGY)

== Stats ==
- Regular season
  - Player expect goalie
    - Goal
      - East Martine Caissie (46, ATL)
      - West Shaundra Bruvall (43, CGY)
    - Assist
      - East Kaitlyn Youldon (63, GAT)
      - West Justine Exner (34, CGY)
    - Point
      - East Julie Blanchette, Kaitlyn Youldon (100, MTL and GAT respectively)
      - West Shaundra Bruvall (88, CGY)
  - Goalie
    - Saving %
      - East Jessie Callander (.920, CAM)
      - West Ellen Hoban (.909, CGY)
    - Goals against average
      - East Jessie Callander (3.22, CAM)
      - West Breanna Beck (2.90, EDM)
    - Win
      - East Danni Walser (12, CAM)
      - West Ellen Hoban (10, CGY)
- Playoff
