= 2013–14 National Ringette League season =

National Ringette League season

- League: National Ringette League
- Sport: Ringette
- Duration: October 5, 2013 – March 9, 2014; March 15, 2014 – April 12 (playoff)
- Games: East: 26; West: 25
- Teams: 13

Regular season
- Season champions: East: Cambridge Turbos; West: Calgary RATH
- Season MVP: Dailyn Bell (EDM)

League Playoffs

Final
- Champions: Ottawa Ice (1st title)

National Ringette League seasons
- ← 2012–13 2014–15 →

The 2013–14 National Ringette League season for the sport of ringette was the 10th season of the National Ringette League and began on October 5, 2013 and ended on March 9, 2014.

The Ottawa Ice won their first ever title.

== Teams ==
Three teams did not join this season.

- Quebec City Cyclones: East Division
- Prairie Fire: West Division
- BC Thunder: West Division

== Regular seasons ==
Teams played in following formats.

- East
  - Plays 2 to 3 games against same sub-division teams and 2 games to same sub-division teams.
  - Plays 0 or 2 games against each or both of West division teams.
- West
  - Play 11 games against same division team.
  - Play 0 or 2 against East division teams.

== Standings ==
- x indicates clinches the playoff
- y indicates clinches the Championship (Elite Eight)

=== East Conference ===
	GP	W	L	SL	PTS
y-Cambridge Turbos	26	25	1	0	50
y-Montreal Mission	26	23	3	0	46
x-Ottawa Ice	26	21	4	1	43
x-Richmond Hill Lightning	26	14	10	2	30
x-Gloucester Devils	26	12	11	3	27
x-Waterloo Wildfire	26	11	15	0	22
x-Le Royal de Bourassa	26	8	15	3	19
x-Gatineau Fusion	26	8	18	0	16
x-Rive Sud Revolution	26	7	17	2	16
x-Lac St.Louis Adrenaline	26	6	17	3	15
Atlantic Attack	26	3	23	0	6

=== West Conference ===
	GP	W	L	SL	PTS
y-Calgary RATH	25	18	3	4	40
y-Edmonton WAM!	25	12	11	2	26

== Allstar game ==
- This was the second Allstar game in the League.
- The team name in the parenthesis is the team player belongs to at that time.
8 March 2014

Team Blue	6–5 (2–1, 0–1, 2–0, 2–3)	Team White
Musetti (RH) 1st(3:29), 3rd(11:28), 4th(11:13); Jasper (CAM) 3rd(5:50), 4th(5:15); Kiviaho (ATL) 1st(10:58)		Cartier (MTL) 1st(6:58), 4th(4:01), 4th(12:14); Primard (MTL) 2nd(4:34); Bernard-Lacaille (LSL) 4th(8:46)

Centre d'Excellence Sports Rousseau, Boisbriand, Quebec
Attendance: 0
Referee: Jonathan Cecile, Benoit Ducharme

== Playoffs ==
- Ottawa, Richmond hill, Gloucester and Waterloo win the series in the knockout stage and go to the elite eight.
- In the Elite eight, Cambridge finished the round robin first place and went to the final. Ottawa and Edmonton went to semifinal.
- In the semifinal, Ottawa beat the Edmonton to the final against Cambridge.
- Ottawa beat Cambridge 7–4 to win the first ever title.

== Award ==
- MVP: Dailyn Bell (EDM)
- Top Goalie: Tori Goble (OTT)

== Stats ==
- Regular season
  - Player except goalie
    - Goal
      - East Jacqueline Gaudet (91, CAM)
      - West Dailyn Bell (32, EDM)
    - Assist
      - East Jennifer Gaudet (91, CAM)
      - West Emily Webb (32, CGY)
    - Point
      - East Jacqueline Gaudet, Jennifer Gaudet (both are 126, CAM)
      - West Dailyn Bell (32, EDM)
  - Goalie
    - Saving %
      - East Meghan Pittaway (.919, CAM)
      - West Bobbi Mattson (.891, CGY)
    - Goals against average
      - East Meghan Pittaway (2.80, CAM)
      - West Bobbi Mattson (3.76, CGY)
    - Win
      - East Tori Goble (17, OTT)
      - West Bobbi Mattson (18, CGY)
- Playoffs
