= 2022 World Ringette Championships rosters =

Below are the rosters for the national ringette teams which competed in the 2022 World Ringette Championships.

== Seniors ==
=== Team Canada Senior ===
CANADA SENIOR
Pos.	No.	Player	League	Team
Goaltender
G	29	Grace MacKenzie	(Canada) NRL	Atlantic Attack
G	31	Laurie St-Pierre	(Canada) NRL	Rive-Sud Révolution
G	41	Jasmine LeBlanc	(Canada) NRL	Atlantic Attack
Defence
D	11	Emilie Cunial	(Canada) NRL	Rive-Sud Révolution
D	18	Melissa Misutka (Assistant Captain)	(Canada) NRL	Edmonton WAM!
D	19	Nicole Pelletier	(Canada) NRL	Edmonton Black Gold Rush
D	27	Camille Dumont	(Canada) NRL	Rive-Sud Révolution
D	28	Julie Vandal	(Canada) NRL	Gatineau Fusion
D	52	Brett Van Nieuw Amerongen	(Canada) NRL	Manitoba Herd
D	70	Lydia Duncan	(Canada) NRL	Waterloo Wildfire
Forward
F	4	Ann Sauve	(Canada) NRL	Calgary RATH
F	6	Molly Chorney	(Canada) NRL	Edmonton Black Gold Rush
F	7	Jenny Snowdon (Assistant Captain)	(Canada) NRL	Atlantic Attack
F	9	Nina Tajbakhsh	(Canada) NRL	Edmonton WAM!
F	10	Erika Kiviaho (Captain)	(Canada) NRL	Waterloo Wildfire
F	77	Britney Snowdon	(Canada) NRL	Atlantic Attack
F	99	Laurence Larocque	(Canada) NRL	Rive-Sud Révolution
Centre
C	2	Gillian Dreger	(Canada) NRL	Edmonton WAM!
C	8	Marie-Pier Blanchard	(Canada) NRL	Montreal Mission
C	17	Torrie Shennan	(Canada) NRL	Edmonton WAM!
C	26	Émily Chénier	(Canada) NRL	Gatineau Fusion
C	75	Danielle Bechard	(Canada) NRL	Edmonton Black Gold Rush

TEAM STAFF (CANADA SENIOR)
Position	Name
Team manager	Jen Falloon
Head coach	Lorrie Horne
Assistant coach	Julie Blanchette
Assistant coach	Heather Konkin
Assistant coach	Jacinda Rolph
Assistant coach	Chris Belan
INTEGRATED SUPPORT TEAM (CANADA SENIOR)
Position	Name
Lead Scout	Chris Belan
Strength & Conditioning Consultant	James Clock
Performance Dietician	Kelly Dragger
Head Athletic Therapist	Connie Klassen
Mental Performance Consultant	Laura Pollice
Mental Performance Consultant	Jamie Bunka
RINGETTE CANADA HIGH PERFORMANCE STAFF (CANADA SENIOR)
Position	Name
Manager of High Performance & Athlete Services	Stephanie Laurin
High Performance; Director	Frances Losier
OFFICIALS (CANADA SENIOR)
Position	Name
On-ice official	Geri Lamers
On-ice official	Robert Drury
On-ice official	Alexander Hanes

=== Team Finland Senior ===
FINLAND SENIOR
Number	Name
Forwards
6	Helmi Laivuori
9	Kaisa Hurske
12	Roosa Salonen
13	Kattariina Kurikko (Assistant Captain)
Centres
10	Anne Pohjola (Assistant Captain)
11	Susanna Tapani (Captain)
19	Camilla Ojapalo
20	Maija Väyrynen
22	Marianna Kuiko
33	Riikka Sjögren
Defence
5	Jasmin Kiiski
7	Hanna Ovaska
15	Emmi Merelä
17	Kaisa Viren
18	Miranda Välisaari
Goaltenders
30	Maria Perkkola
31	Kaisa Katajisto
32	Hanna Minkkinen

Team Staff
Position	Name
Team Manager	Sanna Alanko
Communications Manager	Yvonne Koch
Head Coach	Pasi Kataja
Assistant Coach	Marjukka Virta
Assistant Coach	Eevi Kaasinen
Goalkeeper Coach	Aura Lehtonen
Physiotherapist	Sami Aalto
Sports psychologist (certified)	Janica Järvenpää
Trainer	Mika Salminen
Trainer	Pekka Takala

== Juniors ==
=== Team Canada Junior ===
The 2022 Canada Junior Under-21 team (U21) was chosen during a selection camp held in Mississauga, Ontario.

For this WRC, athletes were named to Ringette Canada’s, "Junior National Travelling Team Roster". This roster was made up of 20 "Playing Roster" athletes, and 2 "Development Roster" athletes. Development Roster athletes were only added to the Playing Roster if the athlete was deemed unfit to play for medical reasons and thus needed to be removed from the Playing Roster.

CANADA JUNIOR (U21)
Number	Name	League	Team
Forwards
2	Cloé LeBlanc	(Canada) NRL	Atlantic Attack
5	Mikyla Brewster	(Canada) NRL	Calgary RATH
14	Vail Ketsa	(Canada) NRL	Edmonton WAM!
16	Nicole Girardin	(Canada) NRL	Manitoba Herd
17	Emma Kelly (Assistant Captain)	(Canada) NRL	Nepean Ravens
51	Mégane Fortin (Assistant Captain)	(Canada) NRL	Montréal Mission
93	Erika Neubrand	(Canada) NRL	Cambridge Turbos
Centres
11	Erin Ung	(Canada) NRL	Calgary RATH
19	Belle Paisley	(Canada) NRL	Manitoba Herd, Steinbach Panther and Eastman Flame
81	Alexsi Kavvadas	(Canada) NRL	Manitoba Herd
Defence
9	Katherine Shaughnessy	(Canada) NRL	Cambridge Turbos
10	Jasmine Menard	(Canada) NRL	Gatineau Fusion
23	Geneviève Belliveau	(Canada) NRL	Atlantic Attack
26	Tatum Allen	(Canada) NRL	Cambridge Turbos
44	Regan Meier		Calgary U19AA
58	Kaylee Armstrong		Calgary U19AA
88	Marla Wheeler (Captain)	(Canada) NRL	Calgary RATH
Goaltenders
1	Holland Kozan	(Canada) NRL	Saskatchewan Heat
30	Rachael Pelisek	(Canada) NRL	Nepean Ravens
34	Paige Roy		Calgary U19AA
Development Roster Athletes
3	Quinn Ladoon		Calgary West Hillhurst Open A
97	Jalena Marelic	(Canada) NRL	Nepean Ravens

Team Staff
Position	Name
Head Coach	Mark Beal
Assistant Coach	Colleen Hagan
Assistant Coach	Keely Brown
Assistant Coach	Andrea Ferguson
Athletic Therapist	Melinda Krulicki
Team Manager	Jocelyn MacLeod
Officials
On-ice official	Geri Lamers
On-ice official	Robert Drury
On-ice official	Alexander Hanes

=== Team Finland Junior ===
The 2022 Finland Junior Under-21 team (U21) included a total of 18 players. In addition, two separate teams, Finland U18, competed against national teams who were in the 2022 President's Pool. One team involved players born in 2004, the other in 2005.

FINLAND JUNIOR (U21)
Number	Name
Forwards
7	Emmi Juusela
9	Kia Kosunen (Assistant Captain)
10	Meeri Lonka
12	Minka Levander
13	Essi Sarmala
18	Iina Kupiainen
19	Mette Nurminen
17	Vilma Tuominiemi
15	Eerika Viro
Centres
11	Jenna Hakkarainen
20	Minka Tiihonen
Defence
3	Enni Ojala (Captain)
5	Karola Kosunen
6	Maria Wetterstrand (Assistant Captain)
14	Kia Erkkilä
16	Emilia Hirvonen
Goaltenders
30	Mona Rytkönen
31	Siiri Uusitalo

Team staff
Position	Name
Team Manager	Petra Ahokas
Communications Manager	Viivi Väätänen
Head Coach	Nina Sundell
Assistant Coach	Petra Ojaranta
Goalie Coach	Aura Lehtonen
Video Coach	Vesa Lönngren
Trainer	Tony Samuelsson
Trainer	Jari Koski
Physiotherapist	Noora Nojonen

== President's Pool ==
=== Team Sweden Senior ===
SWEDEN SENIOR
Pos.	Number	Name
Goalie	35	Kaisa Juntunen
Goalie	1	Erica Richardson
Pos.	Number	Name
	2	Sara Klint
	3	Sarah Esmail (Canada)
	4	Kajsa Frankenberg
	6	Anna Norrbom (Assistant Captain)
	7	Maja Andersson
	9	Jessica Alakärppä
	11	Wilma Frankenberg
	12	Nilla Wernersson (Assistant Captain)
	13	Amanda Olofsson
	17	Carolina Cordova
	18	Jennifer Peterback
	20	Ellen Granath
	21	Emilia Castañeda Månsson
	22	Saga Bergström
	23	Alma Lindqvist
	24	Jessika Runolf Lindqvist (Captain)
Team Staff
Head coach	Bruce Graham
Assistant coach	Rachel Graham
Assistant coach
Trainer

=== Team USA Senior ===
Roster:

USA SENIOR
Number	Name
Forwards
7	Cadence Pirtle
12	Campbell Schnurr
14	Nyah Bodnarchuk
15	Shaelyn Corasiniti (Captain)
17	Tiffany Muylle
25	Renee Hoppe (Captain)
37	Denise Berry
Centre
8	Hilary Davidson (Captain)
10	Jaclyn Lovelett
82	Haley Wickens
Defence
2	Madison Broadhurst
3	Moira Davidson (Captain)
4	Diana Coolidge
5	Ellie O'Sullivan
6	Sara Hayami
9	Brianna Stanford
11	Brianna Faber
Goaltenders
1	Brianna Burke
31	Ashley Steele

Team Staff
Position	Name
Manager	Heather Graham
Assistant Manager	Keith Graham
Head Coach	Kari Sadoway
Assistant Coach	Phyllis Sadoway
Assistant Coach	Beth Vallis
Assistant Coach	Jason Sjostram
Assistant Coach	Devon Lowe

=== Team Czech Republic Senior ===
CZECH REPUBLIC SENIOR
Pos.	Number	Name
Goalie	23	Veronika Hulková
Goalie	99	Kateřina Prokešová
Pos.	Number	Name
Defence	2	Avery Larmour
Defence	17	Nina Gegánová
Defence	21	Babora Šebíková
Defence	88	Petra Volmutová
Pos.	Number	Name
Forward	3	Tereza Nademlejnská
Forward	12	Alena Kančiová
Forward	13	Thea Cazzanti
Forward	16	Michelle Bettauer
Forward	19	Dita Svobodová
Forward	25	Šarlota Tomasco
Forward	29	Kateřina Svobodová
Forward	32	Lenka Kobyláková
Forward	34	Tereza Kašparová
Forward	62	Veronika Kamasová
Pos.	Number	Name
Centre	31	Lenka Kubisková
Centre	33	Arran Arthur
Centre	81	Karolina Kosinová
TEAM STAFF
Head coach		Lenka Kobyláková
Assistant coach		Andrej Jakubec, Radek Husák, Helen Bettauer, Kateřina Svobodová
Manager		Veronika Hůlková
Trainer

=== Finland U18 ===
Two separate teams, Finland U18 2004 (players born in 2004) and Finland U18 2005 (players born in 2005) competed against the 2022 teams of Team Sweden Senior and Team USA Senior.

==== Finland U18 2004 ====
FINLAND U18 2004
Name
Hillevi Holmström
Emilia Sormunen
Neea Hauta-Alus
Jenni Mikkola
Emilia Tuominiemi
Saaga Tuomi
Emmi Rantakari
Iida Tuominiemi
Satu Reunanen
Pihla Alapuranen
Tuuli Hämäläinen
Saani Hietanen
Sara Huttunen
Ida Suokas
Inka Tuulaniemi
Nicole Thesleff
Ella Karhu

==== Finland U18 2005 ====
FINLAND U18 2005
Name
Suvi Saarinen
Milja Lillvist
Tuuli Laakkonen
Katariina Maikola
Mimosa Kyttälä
Emilia Nurmikoski
Milka Mikkola
Oona Rantala
Lulu Karttunen
Sofia Saarela
Noona Pursiainen
Vilma Jokipii
Pinja Toivonen
Sini Pelkonen
Hanna Kauppinen
New Konttinen
Emma Usvala
