= 2018 Canadian Ringette Championships =

- Sport: Ringette
- Duration: April 9, 2018-April 14, 2018
- Teams: U16: 21; U19: 18; NRL: 8
- Finals champions: U16: Angles (1st title); U19: Laurentides (1st title); NRL: Atlantic attack (1st title)

Canadian Ringette Championships seasons
- ← 2017 2019 →

2018 Canadian Ringette Championships was 40th edition of Canadian Ringette Championships. It was a national ringette tournament held from April 9 to April 14, 2018 at Winnipeg, Manitoba.

== Stadium ==
- Bell MTS Iceplex
- Seven Oaks Arena
- Bell MTS Place

== Champions ==
- U16: Angles
- U19: Laurentides
- NRL: Atlantic Attack

== Results ==
c denotes the team clinches the consolation round

x denotes that team clinches first round (U16) or quarterfinal (U19)

y denotes that team clinches quarterfinal (U16)

=== U16 ===
==== Round-robin ====
Pool A

	GP	W	L	OTL	PTS
y-New Brunswick	6	6	0	0	12
y-Regina Stingers	6	5	1	0	10
x-Calgary Shock	6	4	2	0	8
x-Manitoba Magic	6	2	4	0	4
c-Central Alberta Sting	6	2	4	0	4
c-Mississauga Mustangs	6	1	6	0	2
c-BLL	6	1	3	2	2

Pool B

	GP	W	L	OTL	PTS
y-Calgary Surge	6	6	0	0	12
x-Angels	6	4	1	1	8
x-Nepean Ravens	6	4	2	0	8
x-LMRL Thunder	6	3	3	0	6
c-Zone 5 Pack	6	2	4	0	4
c-Spruce Grove Pursuit	6	1	5	0	2
c-Manitoba Wild	6	1	5	0	2

Pool C

	GP	W	L	OTL	PTS
y-Zone 2	6	6	0	0	12
x-Saskatoon Selects	6	5	1	0	10
x-Rive Sud	6	4	2	0	8
x-PEI	6	3	2	1	6
c-Central Whitby Sharks	6	2	4	0	4
c-Sherwood Park Power	6	1	4	1	2
c-Eastman Flames	6	0	5	1	0

==== Championship ====
First round
Rive Sud	7
Calgary Shock	4
Saskatoon Selects	7
LMRL Thunder	8
Angels	6
Manitoba Magic	1
Nepean Ravens	6
PEI	3

Quarterfinal
Calgary Surge	5
Rive Sud	1
Regina Stingers	8
LMRL Thunder	1
Zone 2	6
Angels	7
New Brunswick	4
Nepean Ravens	5

Semifinal
Calgary Surge	6
Regina Stingers	3
Angels	4
Nepean Ravens	3

Final
Calgary Surge	1
Angels	3

==== Consolation ====
First round
Manitoba Wild	2
Eastman Flames	1

Quarterfinal
Central Alberta Sting	7
Manitoba Wild	3
Central Whitby Sharks	4
Spruce Grove Pursuit	5
Sherwood Park Power	2
Mississauga Mustangs	8
Zone 5 Pack	5
BLL	6

Semifinal
Central Alberta Sting	5
Spruce Grove Pursuit	1
Mississauga Mustangs	6
BLL	5

Final
Central Alberta Sting	3
Mississauga Mustangs	5

=== U19 ===
==== Round-robin ====
Pool A

	GP	W	L	OTL	PTS
x-Guelph Predators	8	8	0	0	16
x-Eastman Flames	8	6	2	0	12
x-New Brunswick	8	5	2	1	10
x-BLL	8	4	4	0	8
c-Nova Scotia	8	4	4	0	8
c-Mississauga Mustangs	8	3	4	1	6
c-LMRL Thunder	8	3	4	1	6
c-Edmonton ELITE	8	2	5	1	4
St.Albert Mission	8	1	6	1	2

Pool B

	GP	W	L	SL	PTS
x-Laurentides	8	7	1	0	14
x-Angels	8	7	1	0	14
x-Manitoba Magic	8	6	2	0	12
x-Waterloo Wildfire	8	5	3	0	8
c-Calgary Strive	8	4	4	0	8
c-Saskatchewan	8	3	5	0	6
c-Zone 5 GRIT	8	3	4	1	6
c-TORL Force	8	1	7	0	2
Wave	8	0	7	1	0

==== Championship ====
Quarterfinal
Laurentides	4
BLL	3
Eastman Flames	5
Manitoba Magic	4
Angels	8
New Brunswick	1
Guelph Predators	4
Waterloo Wildfire	7

Semifinal
Laurentides	4
Eastman Flames	3
Angels	6
Waterloo Wildfire	2

Final
Laurentides	3
Angels	2
Third place
Eastman Flames	7
Waterloo Wildfire	2

==== Consolation ====
Quarterfinal		Semifinal		Final
Calgary Strive	5
Edmonton ELITE	4	Calgary Strive	9
Mississauga Mustangs	4	Zone 5 GRIT	7
Zone 5 GRIT	5			Calgary Strive	7
Nova Scotia	4			Nova Scotia	1
TORL Force	3	Nova Scotia	7
Saskatchewan	8	Saskatchewan	0
LMRL Thunder	5

== Mini game ==
=== U16 ===
12 April 2018
2:30pm

Manitoba Magic	1–0	Central Alberta Sting
Kantyluk 10:30(1st)

Bell MTS Iceplex, Winnipeg, Manitoba
Attendance: 0

=== U19 ===
13 April 2018

BLL	1–0 (0-0, 0-0, 0-0, 0-0, OT1 0-0, OT2 1-0)	Nova Scotia
Charbonneau 8:52(2nd OT, PP)

Seven Oaks Arena, Winnipeg, Manitoba
Attendance: 0

== Final ==
=== U16 ===
14 April 2018
9:00am

Calgary Surge	1–3 (0-1, 1-2)	Angels
Ung 9:37(2nd)		Adolphe 15:21(1st); Rogerson 4:36(2nd); Little 9:15(2nd)

Bell MTS Place, Winnipeg, Manitoba
Attendance: 0

=== U19 ===
14 April 2018
1:30pm

Laurentides	3–2 (0-1, 1-2)	Angels
Raymond-Couturier 4:42(1st); Aguiar 11:01(1st, PP); Morroni 17:48(1st)		Lesperance 0:26(1st); Girardin 10:27(2nd, PP)

Bell MTS Place, Winnipeg, Manitoba
Attendance: 0

== Final standing ==
=== U16 ===
: Angels

: Calgary Surges

: Nepean Ravens

4: Regina Stingers

5: New Brunswick

6: Zone 2

7: Rive Sud

8: LMRL Thunder

9: Saskatoon Selects

10: Calgary Shock

11: PEI

12: Manitoba Magic

13: Mississauga Mustangs

14: Central Alberta Sting

15: BLL (QC)

16: Spruce Grove Pursuit (AB)

17: Central Whitby Sharks

18: Zone 5 Pack (AB)

19: Sherwood Park Power (AB)

20: Manitoba Wild

21: Eastman Flames (MB)

=== U19 ===
: Laurentides

: Angels

: Eastman Flames

4: Waterloo Wildfire

5: Guelph Predators

6: Manitoba Magic

7: Team New Brunswick

8: BLL (QC)

9: Calgary Strive

10: Nova Scotia

11: Saskatchewan

12: Zone 5 GRIT (AB)

13: Mississauga Mustangs

14: LMRL Thunder

15: Edmonton Elite

16: TORL Force (BC)

17: St. Albert Mission

18: Wave

=== National Ringette League ===
2018 Canadian Ringette Championships, National Ringette League results:

: Atlantic Attack

: Edmonton WAM!

: Cambridge Turbos

4: Calgary RATH

5: Richmond Hill Lightning

6: Montreal Mission

7: Gatineau Fusion

8: Manitoba Intact

== Awards and all-star team ==
=== Agnes Jacks True Sport awards ===
- U16: Saskatoon Selects
- U19: Eastman Flames
- NRL: Calgary RATH

=== Toughest Competitor Awards ===
- U16: Keala Fleury (Saskatoon Selects)
- U19: Trudy Beamish (Eastman Flames)
- NRL: Chantal Gauthier (Richmond Hill Lighting)

=== 1st all-star team ===
==== U16 ====
- Offence: Emma Kelly – Nepean Ravens
- Offence: Alexsi Kavvadas – Angels
- Offence: Alexane Dupuis – New Brunswick
- Defence: Chanelle Smith – Calgary Surge
- Defence: Reese Lange – Angels
- Goalie: Georgia Fraser - PEI

==== U19 ====
- Offence: Alana Lesperance – Angels
- Offence: Milica Oravec – Eastman Flames
- Offence: Mégane Fortin – Laurentides
- Defence: Nicole Pelletier – Edmonton Elite
- Defence: Gabriele Lefebvre – Laurentides
- Goalie: Marie Ève Dubé – Laurentides

==== NRL ====
- Offence: Martine Caissie – Atlantic Attack
- Offence: Jenny Snowdon – Atlantic Attack
- Offence: Maude Charbonneau – Montreal Mission
- Defence: Paige Nosal – Cambridge Turbos
- Defence: Erica Voss – Richmond Hill Lightning
- Goalie: Karine Doiron – Atlantic Attack

=== 2nd all-star team ===
==== U16 ====
- Offence: Riley Wasylyniuk – Zone 2 Alberta
- Offence: Brynn Nesbitt – Calgary Surge
- Offence: Rileigh Hache – Nepean Ravens
- Defence: Olivia Birstonas – Central Whitby Sharks
- Defence: Grace Brown – Calgary Shock
- Goalie: Julianna McIntyre – Angels

==== U19 ====
- Offence: Kaylee Spearing – Angels
- Offence: Claire Wyville – Guelph Predators
- Offence: Cloé LeBlanc – New Brunswick
- Defence: Laurence St-Denis – Laurentides
- Defence: Emilie Gruninger – Eastman Flames
- Goalie: Janna Griffioen – Guelph Predators

==== NRL ====
- Offence: Chantal St-Laurent – Gatineau Fusion
- Offence: Kaitlyn Youldon – Gatineau Fusion
- Offence: Justine Exner – Calgary RATH
- Defence: Julie Vandal – Gatineau Fusion
- Defence: Lindsay Brown – Edmonton WAM!
- Goalie: Breanna Beck – Edmonton WAM!
