= 2016–17 National Ringette League season =

- League: National Ringette League
- Sport: Ringette
- Duration: October 2, 2016 – February 19, 2017; March 4, 2017 – April 1, 2017 (playoff)
- Games: East: 24; West: 24
- Teams: 16

Regular season
- Season champions: East Conference: Red Division: Cambridge Turbos (1st overall); White Division: Atlantic Attack (2nd overall); West Conference: Calgary Rath
- Season MVP: Shaundra Bruvall

League Playoffs

Final
- Champions: Cambridge Turbos (6th title)

National Ringette League seasons
- ← 2015–16 2017–18 →

The 2016–17 National Ringette League season for the sport of ringette was the 13th season of the National Ringette League and began on October 2, 2016 and ended on April 1, 2017.

The Cambridge Turbos won the championship final, setting a league record for having won six national titles, more than any other team in the league's history.

== Teams ==
A New team joined the 2016–17 season.

- Manitoba Intact

== Regular seasons ==
For East division red teams, they play three games each to same color and two games each to white color teams.

For East division white teams, they play four games to one same color team and two games each to rest of same color teams. They also play two games each to red color teams.

For West division team, they play six games each to same division teams.

The number of home games and that of away games may not be the same.

=== NRL Community Outreach Program match ===
29 October 2016

Gatineau Fusion (0-6-0, 0pt)	8-12 (3-3, 2-1, 2-2, 1-6)	Ottawa Ice (4-0-0, 8pt)
St-Laurent 7:10(1st), 12:26(2nd), 0:13(2nd), 7:42(2nd), 3:00(3rd), 5:33(3rd, PP); Barrette 6:14(1st); D'Aoust 6:06(4th)	Report	Simzer 9:59(1st, PP), 1:10(4th), 4:18(4th); Begin 11:51(1st), 11:20(4th); Lewis 7:57(3rd, PP), 0:46(4th); McBride 5:21(1st, PP); Laviolette 7:51(2nd); MacDonald 4:52(3rd, PP); Kolesnik 2:23(4th); Wippel 5:42(4th)

Aréna Baribeau, Gatineau, Quebec
Attendance: 275
Referee: Richard Desfonds, Emmanuelle Bourbeau

== Standings ==
- d indicates clinches the Division and the Championship (Elite Eight)
- x indicates clinches the playoff
- y indicates clinches the Conference and the Championship (Elite Eight)

=== East Conference ===
	GP	W	L	SL	PTS
yd-Cambridge Turbos	24	19	3	2	40
d-Atlantic Attack	24	18	4	2	38
x-Richmond Hill Lighting	24	16	5	3	35
x-Ottawa Ice	24	16	6	2	34
x-Montreal Mission	24	15	8	1	31
x-Waterloo Wildfire	24	14	8	2	30
x-Glocester Devil	24	13	9	2	28
x-Rive Sud Revolution	24	7	16	1	15
Gatineau Fusion	24	5	16	3	13
Lac St.Louis Adrenaline	24	5	18	1	11
Le Royal de Bourassa	24	4	17	3	11

=== West Conference ===
	GP	W	L	SL	PTS
y-Calgary RATH	24	18	3	3	39
x-Edmonton WAM!	24	17	7	0	34
x-Manitoba Intact	24	14	8	2	30
x-Black Gold Rush	24	9	13	2	20
BC Thunder	24	2	22	0	4

== Playoffs ==
- Richmond Hill, Ottawa, Waterloo, Edmonton and Black Gold wins the knockout stage and advance to Elite Eight.
- The first place Atlantic advance to the final while second place Cambridge advance to the semifinal.
- Waterloo win the tiebreak mini-game against Richmond Hill and advance to the semifinal.
- Cambridge beat the Waterloo and advance to the final.
- Cambridge beat the Atlantic to win their sixth title.

== Awards ==
- MVP: Shaundra Bruvall (CGY)

== Stats ==
- Regular season
  - Player expect goalie
    - Goal
      - East Chantal St-Laurent (58, GAT)
      - West Shaundra Bruvall (43, CGY)
    - Assist
      - East Julie Blanchette (50, MTL)
      - West Shaundra Bruvall (37, CGY)
    - Point
      - East Julie Blanchette (91, MTL)
      - West Shaundra Bruvall (80, CGY)
  - Goalie
    - Saving %
      - East Halli Berry (.910, RH)
      - West Bobbi Mattson (.905, CGY)
    - Goals against average
      - East Halli Berry (3.10, RH)
      - West Breanna Beck (3.35, EDM)
    - Win
      - East Emily Ferguson and Karine Doiron. (14, WAT and ATL respectively)
      - West Bobbi Mattson (11, CGY)
- Playoff
