= 2016 National Ringette League playoffs =

The 2016 National Ringette League Playoffs were the postseason tournament of 2015-16 National Ringette League season. Cambridge Turbos wins the fifth title.

== Format ==
Same as last season except the knockout stage.

In the past, 8 teams from East played, but West became 4 teams, bottom 2 from West will compete in knockout stage.

The draws are E3 vs E8, E4 vs E7, E5 vs E6 and W3 vs W4.

== Knockout stage ==
E stands for east and W stands for west.

=== (E3) Atlantic vs (E8) Bourassa ===
Game 1

12 March 2016

Atlantic Attack	9-5 (1-3, 2-0, 3-2, 3-0)	Le Royal de Bourassa
Proulx 1:31(1st), 4:17(3rd, SH), 2:24(4th); Snowdon 0:42(2nd, PP), 12:39(2nd, PP), 12:11(3rd); Caissie 0:42(3rd), 3:36(4th), 10:17(4th)		Demers 0:16(1st), 7:25(1st); Girard 5:26(1st, PP), 9:16(3rd); Lacharite 11:24(3rd)

Authur J. Leblanc Arena, Dieppe, New Brunswick
Attendance: 750
Referee: David Jones, Marco Mallet, Luc Melanson

Atlantic leads the series 1-0

Game 2

12 March 2016

Le Royal de Bourassa	6-10 (1-4, 2-1, 1-3, 2-2)	Atlantic Attack
Girard 3:16(2nd, PP), 4:26(4th); Daraîche 9:22(1st); Demers 0:40(2nd, SH); Lancaster 6:01(3rd); Clarke 6:10(4th)		Caissie 5:56(1st), 9:02(1st, PP), 6:38(3rd), 9:18(3rd), 3:02(4th, PP); Doiron 2:51(1st), 8:50(4th); Snowdon 11:26(2nd), 8:15(3rd); Proulx 1:36(1st)

Marina Arena, Cocagne, New Brunswick
Attendance: 225
Referee: Marco Mallet, David Jones, Luc Melanson

Atlantic wins the series 2-0

=== (E4) Gloucester vs (E7) Gatineau ===
Game 1

12 March 2016

Gloucester Devils	10-5 (2-2, 4-1, 1-0, 3-2)	Gatineau Fusion
Youldon, Ka. 6:50(1st), 8:23(1st, PP), 3:53(2nd), 6:33(4th); Thompson 2:52(2nd), 3:47(4th), 12:52(4th, PP); Biewald 2:14(2nd); Marcotte 7:16(2nd); Youldon, Ke. 3:35(3rd)		Lewis 3:07(1st), 8:41(2nd), 1:21(2nd); Mainwood 1:01(4th, PP); Bock-Laurin 10:55(4th, PP)

Ray Friel Center, Orleans, Ontario
Attendance: 40
Referee: Melanie Stewart, Marc-André Ouellet

Gloucester leads the series 1-0

Game 2

12 March 2016

Glocester Devils	10-4 (3-1, 2-0, 2-0, 3-2)	Gatineau Fusion
Marcotte 5:20(1st), 7:52(2nd, SH), 8:42(3rd), 5:47(4th); Youldon, Ke. 0:17(1st), 2:56(1st), 5:39(2nd); McGonigal 0:25(3rd); Youldon, Ka. 4:40(4th); Thompson 9:33(4th)		O'Brien 3:56(1st); Rajaobelina 1:58(2nd); St-Laurent 2:31(4th); D'Aoust 8:30(4th)

Fred Barrett Arena, Ottawa, Ontario
Attendance: 100
Referee: David Singh, Mathieu Leduc

Gloucester wins the series 2-0

=== (E5) Ottawa vs (E6) Richmond Hill ===
Game 1

12 March 2016

Ottawa Ice	10-5 (4-4, 1-0, 1-1, 4-0)	Richmond Hill Lighting
Hartley 0:48(1st), 9:21(4th); Wood 4:51(1st), 9:57(4th); Begin 12:40(3rd), 10:54(4th); Lugg 3:56(1st, PP); MacAdam 11:34(1st); MacDonald 4:48(2nd); Simzer 2:57(4th, PP)		Jones 1:06(1st), 3:01(3rd, PP); Barbosa 11:59(1st); McWilliams 12:13(1st); Richardson 12:58(1st)

Tom Brown Arena, Ottawa, Ontario
Attendance: 50
Referee: David Singh, Mathieu Leduc

Ottawa leads the series 1-0

Game 2

12 March 2016

Richmond Hill Lighting	6-7 (2-3, 1-1, 2-1, 1-1, SO0-1)	Ottawa Ice
Hurren 4:18(1st), 12:43(4th); Gibson 2:12(1st); Barbosa 5:34(2nd); Simone 7:59(3rd, SH); Munro 10:25(3rd); SO; Hurren (no goal); Simone (goal); McWilliams (no goal)		MacAdam 7:38(2nd), 11:38(3rd); Simzer 1:57(1st); Lugg 5:23(1st); Hartley 10:34(1st); Begin 7:27(4th); SO; Lugg (goal); Simzer (goal); Hartley (no goal)

Peplinski Arena, Ottawa, Ontario
Attendance: 60
Referee: Benoit Ducharme, Richard Desfonds

Ottawa wins the series 2-0

=== (W3) BC vs (W4) Black Gold ===
Game 1

12 March 2016

BC Thunder	2-3 (0-2, 0-1, 1-0, 1-0)	Black Gold Rush
Moleschi 1:14(3rd); Hannesson 6:01(4th)		Pronovost 0:37(1st), 6:58(1st); Andruchow 3:31(2nd)

Tri Leisure Spruce Grove, Spruce Grove, Alberta
Attendance: 80
Referee: Lori-Anne Kindopp, Jaki Leckman

Black Gold leads the series 1-0

Game 2

13 March 2016

Black Gold Rush	3-4 (1-2, 0-1, 1-0, 1-1)	BC Thunder
Henderson 2:15(1st); Bechard 6:05(3rd); Pronovost 6:44(4th)		Moleschi 1:31(1st); Hannesson 12:09(1st); Desrosiers 3:47(2nd); Cichos 6:20(4th)

Servus Place, St. Albert, Alberta
Attendance: 150
Referee: Michelle MacRae, Lori-Anne Kindopp

BC ties the series 1-1

Game 3

13 March 2016

BC Thunder	3-6 (0-0, 1-2, 1-1, 1-3)	Black Gold Rush
Moleschi 6:09(2nd); Tajbakhsh 11:46(3rd); Cichos 1:15(4th)		Pronovost 4:01(2nd), 11:59(2nd), 4:57(3rd), 2:47(4th), 12:57(4th); Henderson 2:01(4th)

Servus Place, St. Albert, Alberta
Attendance: 150
Referee: Lori-Anne Kindopp, Michelle MacRae

Black Gold wins the series 2-1

== Elite Eight ==
All games played at Western Fair Sports Centre and Earl Nichols Park, all located at London, Ontario from April 4 to 8.

- x indicates clinches semifinal.
- y indicates clinches final directly.

	GP	W	L	OTL	PTS
y-Gloucester Devils	7	7	0	0	14
x-Cambridge Turbos	7	5	2	0	10
x-Ottawa Ice	7	5	2	0	10
Edmonton WAM!	7	4	3	0	8
Montreal Mission	7	3	4	0	6
Calgary RATH	7	2	5	0	4
Atlantic Attack	7	1	6	0	2
Black Gold Rush	7	1	6	0	2

== Semifinal ==
8 April 2016

Cambridge Turbos	7-3 (1-0, 2-1, 1-1, 3-1)	Ottawa Ice
Nosal, P. 1:03(1st), 1:13(3rd); Gaudet, Je. 8:35(4th), 12:32(4th, EN); Nosal, S. 4:29(2nd); Cambell 5:50(2nd); Gaudet, Ja. 10:20(4th,EN)		Simzer 4:38(2nd); MacAdam 4:56(3rd); Hartley 8:44(4th)

Western Fair Sports Centre, London, Ontario
Attendance: 0
Referee: Jaimie Nelson, Marco Mallet

Cambridge goes to the final

== Final ==
9 April 2016

Gloucester Devils	3-5 (1-2, 2-1, 0-1, 0-1)	Cambridge turbos
Youldon, Ke. 3:49(1st), 9:48(2nd); Youldon, Ka. 0:33(2nd)		Gaudet, Ja. 6:42(1st,PP), 9:22(1st,SH), 6:28(3rd), 2:34(4th); Nosal 1:39(2nd)

Western Fair Sports Centre, London, Ontario
Attendance: 0
Referee: Jaimie Nelson, Amy Murray

=== Roster ===
Cambridge Turbos

- Findlay, Melissa
- Campbell, Taylor
- Wouters, Sharolyn
- Welsh, Abigail
- Gaudet, Jennifer
- Musetti (Nosal), Samantha
- Dupuis, Jenna
- Granger, Sydney
- Wise, Jaclyn
- Adams, Sheri
- Gaudet, Jacqueline
- Nosal, Paige
- McCullough, Samantha
- Jasper, Elyssa
- Denstedt, Josslyn
- Nosal, Sydney
- Callander, Jessie (goalie)

Glocester Devils

- McGonigal, Lauren
- van Koppen, Jenna
- Youldon, Kaitlyn
- Mainwood, Jessica
- Thompson, Brianna
- Scapillati, Dom
- Woods, Darcy
- Biewald, Allison
- Gour, Amanda
- Mulders, Katherine
- O'Brien, Alison
- Marcotte, Allie
- Hagan, Colleen
- Youldon, Kelsey
- LeBlanc, Jasmine (goalie)

== Leaders ==
- Player except goalie
  - Goal
    - East: Jacqueline Gaudet (18, CAM)
    - West: Dailyn Bell, Shaundra Bruvall, Tori Hart (9, first is EDM and last two are CGY)
  - Assist
    - East: Taylor Cambell (20, CAM)
    - West: Justine Exner (13, CGY)
  - Point
    - East: Kelsey Youldon (31, CAM)
    - West: Shaundra Bruvall (20, CGY)
- Goalie
  - Saving %
    - East Jasmine LeBlanc (.894, GLO)
    - West Amy Clarkson (.907, BC)
  - Goals against average
    - East Danni Walser (2.50, CAM)
    - West Jessi Daniels (3.53, EDM)
  - Win
    - East Jasmine LeBlanc (9, GLO)
    - West Jessi Daniels (3, EDM)
