= 2015 National Ringette League playoffs =

The 2015 National Ringette League Playoffs were the postseason tournament of 2014-15 National Ringette League season. Cambridge Turbos defeated the Richmond Hill Lighting to win the 4th title.

== Format ==
Same as 2014 Playoff except without phrase in parentheses.

== Knockout stage ==
=== (3) Ottawa vs (10) Gatineau ===
Game 1

7 March 2015

Ottawa Ice	11-5 (1-2, 3-1, 2–2, 5-0)	Gatineau Fusion
Hartley 9:46(1st, PP), 12:20(PP, 2nd), 1:28(3rd), 0:11(4th, PP), 5:03(4th, PP); Laframboise 0:16(2nd), 4:40(3rd), 5:39(4th, PP); Love, K. 7:16(2nd); Love, J. 2:14(4th)		St-Laurent 2:09(1st), 7:04(2nd); Girard 6:07(1st, PP); Barrette 2:19(3rd); Mainwood 4:57(3rd)

Sandy Hill Arena, Ottawa, Ontario
Attendance: 96
Referee: Benoit Ducharme, Jessica Lalonde

Ottawa leads the series 1-0

Game 2

8 March 2015

Gatineau Fusion	7-11 (1-3, 2-3, 2-3, 2–2)	Ottawa Ice
Girard 5:20(2nd), 7:51(4th), 11:13(4th); St-Laurent 9:08(2nd), 4:07(3rd); Bock-Laurin 1:12(1st); Gaudreau 2:14(3rd)		Simzer 4:31(2nd), 2:32(3rd), 9:11(4th, PP); Hartley 8:37(1st), 0:26(3rd); Begin 8:33(2nd), 0:33(4th, PP); Gross 11:04(1st); Laframboise 12:45(1st); McBride 4:23(3rd)

Peplinski Arena, Ottawa, Ontario
Attendance: 54
Referee: David Singh, Marc-André Ouellet

Ottawa wins the series 2–0

=== (4) Gloucester vs (9) Atlantic ===
Game 1

7 March 2015

Gloucester Devils	7-2 (2-0, 3-1, 1-0, 1-1)	Atlantic Attack
Hagan 6:51(1st), 3:32(2nd), 12:51(2nd); Youldon 12:24(1st), 0:24(4th); McGonigal 11:19(2nd, PP), 4:18(3rd)		Caissie 9:21(2nd); Cormier 9:03(4th)

Earl Armstrong Arena, Gloucester, Ontario
Attendance: 60
Referee: Emmanuelle Bourbeau, Benoit Ducharme

Gloucester leads the series 1-0

Game 2

8 March 2015

Atlantic Attack	3-8 (1-2, 2-1, 0-2, 0-3)	Gloucester Devils
Hannah 12:21(1st), 7:36(2nd, SH); Doiron 3:39(2nd)		Youldon, Ka. 5:32(2nd, PP), 12:22(3rd), 4:57(4th); McGonigal 12:45(1st), 5:30(3rd); Youldon, Ke. 5:42(1st, SH); Biewald 1:52(4th); Thompson 11:52(4th)

Bob MacQuarrie Recreation Complex, Orleans, Ontario
Attendance: 0
Referee: Mathieu Leduc, David Singh

Gloucester wins the series 2–0

=== (5) Richmond Hill vs (8) Bourassa ===
Game 1

7 March 2015

Richmond Hill Lighting	5-6 (2-1, 2-2, 0-0, 1-3)	Le Royal de Bourassa
Simone 8:17(1st, PP), 12:04(2nd); Jones 8:59(1st); Kiviaho 2:38(2nd); McWilliams 7:08(4th)		Demers 0:20(1st), 12:17(2nd), 5:57(4th); Daraîche 0:36(2nd), 0:40(4th, PP), 4:48(4th)

Ed Sackfield, Richmond Hill, Ontario
Attendance: 32
Referee: Jeff Evans, Robert Drury

Bourassa leads the series 1-0

Game 2

7 March 2015

Le Royal de Bourassa	6-7 (1-1, 0-1, 2-1, 3-4)	Richmond Hill Lighting
Demers 0:23(1st), 8:55(3rd), 7:07(4th), 12:59(4th, PP); Daraîche, A. 4:50(3rd); Daraîche, M. 3:24(4th)		Kiviaho 0:40(1st), 7:07(2nd); Johnston 2:25(4th, PP), 10:22(4th); McWilliams 3:42(3rd); Gibson 3:37(4th); Simone 6:45(4th, PP)

Ed Sackfield, Richmond Hill, Ontario
Attendance: 45
Referee: Robert Drury, Lorie Grant

The series ties 1-1

Game 3

8 March 2015

Richmond Hill Lighting	4-3 (2-2, 1-0, 1-1, 0-0)	Le Royal de Bourassa
Gibson 7:54(1st); McWilliams 11:24(1st, PP); Reaman 8:37(2nd, PP); Simone 4:17(3rd)		Daraîche 2:37(1st, PP); Lacharite 5:34(1st, PP); Demers 1:20(3rd, SH)

Tom Graham Arena, Richmond Hill, Ontario
Attendance: 49
Referee: Robert Drury, Janyce Gunn

Richmond Hill wins the series 2-1

=== (6) Waterloo vs (7) Lac St.Louis ===
Game 1

7 March 2015

Waterloo Wildfire	10-8 (4-2, 1-2, 2-3, 3-1)	Lac St.Louis Adrenaline
Scott, J. 3:11(1st, PP), 12:46(3rd), 0:40(4th); Bakker 10:51(1st), 3:31(3rd), 8:22(4th, PP); Scott, R. 0:32(1st); Duncan 12:53(1st); Wilson 11:52(2nd); Kelly 7:03(4th, PP)		Bordeleau 1:29(2nd), 3:58(3rd), 12:16(3rd); Groulx 10:10(1st), 10:46(3rd); Bédard 9:23(1st); Bernard-Lacaille 8:37(2nd); Arama 4:24(4th)

RIM Park, Waterloo, Ontario
Attendance: 30
Referee: Lorie Grant, Denise Pelletier

Waterloo leads the series 1-0

Game 2

7 March 2015

Lac St.Louis Adrenaline	8-7 (1-1, 2-1, 2-2, 3-3)	Waterloo Wildfire
Bédard 5:53(2nd), 8:28(3rd), 12:01(4th); Paquet Lajoie 8:57(2nd), 12:58(4th); Groulx 6:33(1st); Trudeau 12:50(3rd); Keeble 3:05(4th)		Scott 0:58(3rd, PP), 9:38(4th); Kelly 2:41(4th, PP), 8:48(4th); Bakker 0:10(1st); Duncan 9:47(2nd); Hutchings 3:07(3rd)

RIM Park, Waterloo, Ontario
Attendance: 75
Referee: Brent Bunting, Karen Meek

The series ties 1-1

Game 3

8 March 2015

Waterloo Wildfire	7-3 (3-0, 2-1, 2-2, 0-0)	Lac St.Louis Adrenaline
Kelly 0:55(1st), 9:31(1st, PP); Scott, J. 2:28(1st), 12:06(3rd, PP); Scott, R. 5:24(2nd, PP), 10:13(3rd); Collins 1:58(2nd)		Bédard 7:21(3rd), 8:26(3rd); Groulx 9:30(2nd)

RIM Park, Waterloo, Ontario
Attendance: 39
Referee: Mark Brisson, Denise Pelletier

Waterloo wins the series 2-1

== Elite Eight ==
All games were played at Casman Centre, Suncor Community Leisure Center, Frank Lacroix Arena, all located Fort McMurray, Alberta and only game between Richmond Hill and Edmonton played at Fort McKay Arena, Fort McKay, Alberta from March 30 to April 3.

- x indicates clinches semifinal.
- y indicates clinches final directly.

	GP	W	L	OTL	PTS
y-Cambridge Turbos	7	6	1	0	12
x-Richmond Hill Lighting	7	5	2	0	10
x-Edmonton WAM!	7	5	2	0	10
Calgary RATH	7	4	2	1	8
Ottawa Ice	7	3	4	0	6
Montreal Mission	7	3	4	0	6
Waterloo Wildfire	7	1	6	0	2
Gloucester Devils	7	1	5	1	2

== Semifinal ==
Richmond Hill vs. Edmonton

3 April 2015

Richmond Hill Lighting	4-3 (1-0, 0-1, 2-1, 0-0, OT1-0)	Edmonton WAM!
Jones 8:07(1st, PP), 0:12(OT); Reaman 5:31(3rd); Simone 8:01(3rd, PP)		Bell 12:15(3rd, PP), 3:16(4th, PP); Debaji 4:49(2nd)

Casman Centre, Fort McMurray, Alberta
Attendance: 200
Referee: Robert Drury, Mario Periard

Richmond Hill goes to the final.

== Final ==
Cambridge vs. Richmond Hill

4 April 2015

Cambridge Turbos	6-2 (1-1, 1-0, 2-1, 2-0)	Richmond Hill Lighting
Gauget 10:20(1st), 12:09(3rd, PP); Adams 11:12(2nd), 9:45(4th); Nosal 5:08(3rd, PP); Jesper 4:37(4th, PP)		McWilliams 0:41(1st), 11:07(3rd, PP)

Casman Centre, Fort McMurray, Alberta
Attendance: 0
Referee: Benoit Ducharme, David Jones, Janyce Gunn

=== Roster ===
Richmond Hill Lighting

- van Frankfoort, Lana
- Reaman, Shae-Lynn
- Duguay, Karen
- McWilliams, Karen
- Jones, Jessica
- Stinson, Shelby
- Hurren, Beth
- Munro, Carling
- Hodgson, Samantha
- Johnston, Kristin
- Simone, Melissa
- Voss, Erica
- Gibson, Megan
- Kiviaho, Erika
- Miller, Ashley (goalie)

Cambridge Turbos

- Findlay, Melissa
- Campbell, Taylor
- Adams, Sheri
- Gaudet, Jennifer
- Musetti (Nosal), Samantha
- Dupuis, Jenna
- Granger, Sydney
- Wise, Jaclyn
- Walden, Brittany
- Gaudet, Jacqueline
- Nosal, Paige
- Barey, Nadia
- McCullough, Samantha
- Jasper, Elyssa
- Pittaway, Meghan (goalie)

== Leaders ==
- Player except goalie
  - Goal
    - East: Jacqueline Gaudet (16, CAM)
    - West: Jamie Bell (12, EDM)
  - Assist
    - East: Emily Bakker (20, WAT)
    - West: Shaundra Bruvall (14, CGY)
  - Point
    - East: Julie Blanchette (30, MTL)
    - West: Shaundra Bruvall (22, CGY)
- Goalie
  - Saving %
    - East Veronique Simard, Ashley Miller (both are .913, BOU and RH respectively)
    - West Bobbi Mattson (.909, CGY)
  - Goals against average
    - East Jasmine LeBlanc (2.50, GLO)
    - West Breanna Beck (3.90, EDM)
  - Win
    - East Meghan Pittaway (5, CAM)
    - West Breanna Beck, Bobbi Mattson (both are 4, EDM and CGY respectively)
