= 2015–16 National Ringette League season =

- League: National Ringette League
- Sport: Ringette
- Duration: October 3, 2015 – March 12, 2016; March 12, 2016 - April 9, 2016 (playoff)
- Games: East: 28; West: 26
- Teams: 15

Regular season
- Season champions: East: Cambridge Turbos; West: Edmonton WAM!
- Season MVP: Jaqueline Gaudet

League Playoffs

Final
- Champions: Cambridge Turbos (5th title)

National Ringette League seasons
- ← 2014–15 2016–17 →

The National Ringette League played its 12th season of ringette in 2015–16, beginning on October 3, 2015, and ending on April 9, 2016.

The Cambridge Turbos won the national championship, winning their fifth national title.

== Teams ==
Another team joined the league this season.

- Edmonton Black Gold Rush: West Division

Quebec City Cyclones and Prairie Fire did not join the league for three straight seasons.

== Regular seasons ==
East Division teams would play 28 games which consisted 1, 2 or 4 games against same division team and some of those team will played against West Division teams none, 2 or 4 games.

West Division teams would play 26 games which consisted 6 games against same division team and play none, 2 or 4 game against East Division teams.

=== Season Opener ===
This was the first game of the season and was sponsored by Fuelling Women Championship.

3 October 2015

Atlantic Attack (1-0-0, 2pt)	9-2 (1-0, 2-1, 2-1, 4-0)	Rive Sud Revolution (0-1-0, 0pt)
Snowdown 6:37(2nd), 4:43(4th, PP), 11:05(4th, PP); Caissie 11:02(3rd, PP), 11:58(3rd, PP), 5:11(4th); Doiron 2:55(1st); Proulx 7:55(2nd); Mason 1:53(4th)		Lapointe 7:28(2nd), 4:27(3rd, PP)

Aitken University Centre, Fredericton, New Brunswick
Attendance: 1200
Referee: David Jones, Tim Brun, Mandy Avery

== Standings ==
- x indicates clinches the playoff
- y indicates clinches the Championship (Elite Eight)

=== East Conference ===
	GP	W	L	SL	PTS
y-Cambridge Turbos	28	24	2	2	50
y-Montreal Mission	28	21	5	2	44
x-Atlantic Attack	28	20	7	1	41
x-Gloucester Devils	28	19	8	1	39
x-Ottawa Ice	28	17	11	0	34
x-Richmond Hill Lighting	28	16	11	1	33
x-Gatineau Fusion	28	12	15	1	25
x-Le Royal de Bourassa	28	8	18	2	16
Waterloo Fildfire	28	6	19	3	15
Lac St.Louis Adrenaline	28	5	22	1	11
Rive Sud Revolution	28	5	22	1	11

=== West Conference ===
	GP	W	L	SL	PTS
y-Edmonton WAM!	26	21	3	2	44
y-Calgary RATH	26	16	9	1	33
x-BC Thunder	26	9	17	0	18
x-Black Gold Rush	26	7	16	3	17

== Playoffs ==
- Atlantic, Gloucester, Ottawa and Black Gold wins the knockout stage and advance to Elite Eight.
- Gloucester is in first place of Elite eight and clinches final directly. While, Cambridge and Ottawa is second and third place respectively, they clinch semifinal.
- Cambridge beat the Ottawa and advance to the final.
- Cambridge beat the Gloucester to win the final. This is the first loss for Gloucester in the playoffs.

== Award ==
- MVP: Jaqueline Gaudet (CAM)

== Stats ==
- Regular season
  - Player expect goalie
    - Goal
      - East Jacqueline Gaudet, Martine Caissie (both are 61, CAM and ATL respectively)
      - West Shaundra Bruvall (48, CGY)
    - Assist
      - East Julie Blanchette (83, MTL)
      - West Shaundra Bruvall (35, CGY)
    - Point
      - East Julie Blanchette (128, MTL)
      - West Shaundra Bruvall (83, CGY)
  - Goalie
    - Saving %
      - East Jessie Callander (.910, CAM)
      - West Bobbi Mattson (.901, CGY)
    - Goals against average
      - East Jessie Callander (3.27, CAM)
      - West Breanna Beck (3.46, EDM)
    - Win
      - East Jessie Callander (15, CAM)
      - West Breanna Beck (10, EDM)
- Playoff
