= 2017 National Ringette League playoffs =

The 2017 National Ringette League Playoffs were the postseason tournament of 2016-17 National Ringette League season. Cambridge Turbos wins the sixth titles.

== Format ==
The playoffs were similar to the previous playoffs, except for the knockout stage.

In the past, 8 teams from East played, but West became 5 teams, three teams which are 2nd place to 4th place team from West will compete in knockout stage.

The draws are E3 vs E8, E4 vs E7, E5 vs E6 and the three teams from the West will play double elimination playoff and top two teams will advance.

== Knockout stage ==
=== Eastern Conference ===
==== (3) Richmond Hill vs (8) Rive Sud ====
Game 1

4 March 2017
2:00pm EST

Richmond Hill Lighting	8–3 (3-0, 2-1, 1-2, 2-0)	Rive Sud Revolution
Richardson 10:16(1st, PP), 8:13(2nd, PP); Gauthier 11:54(1st), 3:46(3rd, PP); Voss 5:56(1st); Munro 9:28(2nd); McWilliams 10:31(4th, PP); Gibson 11:06(4th)		Vachon 1:24(2nd); Simoneau 8:23(3rd); Lavoie 12:10(3rd)

Ed Sackfield Arena, Richmond Hill, Ontario
Attendance: 52
Referee: Denise Pelletier, Robert Drury

Richmond Hill leads the series 1-0

Game 2

4 March 2017
7:00pm EST

Richmond Hill Lighting	10–3 (3-1, 1-2, 2-0, 4-0)	Rive Sud Revolution
Gibson 7:55(1st), 9:45(1st, PP), 12:50(4th, PP); Richardson 6:30(1st), 5:44(3rd); Munro 2:55(4th), 6:11(4th); Simone 7:55(2nd); Hurren 4:54(3rd); Johnston 4:17(4th)		Lapointe 10:11(1st), 9:00(2nd); Jean 10:32(2nd)

Ed Sackfield Arena, Richmond Hill, Ontario
Attendance: 51
Referee: Robert Drury, Geri Lamers

Richmond Hill wins the series 2-0

==== (4) Ottawa vs (7) Gloucester ====
Game 1

4 March 2017
12:00pm EST

Ottawa Ice	4–3 (1-1, 1-2, 1-0, 1-0)	Gloucester Devils
Hartley, J. 1:36(1st); Hartley, C. 7:06(2nd); Begin 11:55(3rd); MacDonald 0:22(4th, PP)		Bieward 5:56(1st), 8:33(2nd); Thompson 6:56(2nd)

Charleton University Ice House, Ottawa, Ontario
Attendance: 62
Referee: Danielle Lalonde, Emmanuelle Bourbeau

Ottawa leads the series 1-0

Game 2

5 March 2017
11:00am EST

Ottawa Ice	3–6 (1-2, 0-1, 1-1, 1-2)	Gloucester Devils
MacAdam 8:24(1st); Simzer 7:30(3rd, PP); MacDonald 7:11(4th)		Marcotte 5:38(1st), 4:57(2nd); Youldon 10:05(1st), 6:45(4th); Thompson 1:38(3rd), 11:39(4th, PP)

Bell Centennial Arena, Nepean, Ontario
Attendance: 63
Referee: Mario Periard, Alex Haines

Gloucester ties the series 1-1

Game 3

5 March 2017
4:00pm EST

Ottawa Ice	6–5 (2-1, 2-0, 1-3, 1-1)	Gloucester Devils
Simzer 8:00(1st), 11:38(4th); Hatley, J. 4:47(1st, PP); Hartley, C. 9:23(2nd, PP); Begin 10:15(2nd); MacAdam 12:59(3rd)		Biewald 4:55(3rd), 8:12(3rd, PP), 11:46(4th); Marcotte 8:15(1st); McGonigal 1:48(3rd)

Peplinski Arena, Ottawa, Ontario
Attendance: 98
Referee: Mario Periard, Alex Haines

Ottawa wins the series 2-1

==== (5) Montreal vs (6) Waterloo ====
Game 1

4 March 2017
11:00am EST

Montreal Mission	3–6 (1-2, 1-1, 0-1, 1-2)	Waterloo Wildfire
Charbonneau 0:56(1st), 8:32(4th, PP); Pellerin 6:51(2nd)		Youldon 0:29(1st), 2:17(1st), 10:15(2nd); Markle 0:23(3rd), 11:13(4th); Collins 3:40(4th)

Michel Normandin Arena, Montreal, Quebec
Attendance: 85
Referee: David Singh, Marc St-Hilaire

Waterloo leads the series 1-0

Game 2

4 March 2017
6:30pm EST

Montreal Mission	5–3 (2-0, 1-0, 1-2, 1-1)	Waterloo Wildfire
Charbonneau 3:16(1st), 5:24(1st, PP), 1:02(3rd, PP); Corcoran 4:54(2nd); Blanchette 10:36(4th, PP)		Schouppe 6:16(3rd, PP); Collins 10:47(3rd); Kelly 2:24(4th)

Centre Étienne Desmarteau, Montreal, Quebec
Attendance: 65
Referee: David Singh, Marc St-Hilaire

Montreal ties the series 1-1

Game 3

5 March 2017
2:00pm EST

Montreal Mission	4–6 (1-2, 1-2, 1-0, 1-2)	Waterloo Wildfire
Blanchette 2:15(1st); Brule 10:49(2nd); Charbonneau 8:34(3rd); Pellerin 5:48(4th, SH)		Kiviaho 0:35(2nd), 4:54(2nd), 3:07(4th); Collins 3:31(1st); Kelly 10:25(1st); Youldon 12:59(4th, EN)

Centre Étienne Desmarteau, Montreal, Quebec
Attendance: 152
Referee: David Singh, Norman LaForest

Waterloo wins the series 2-1

=== West Conference ===
==== Standings ====
- x indicates clinch the Elite Eight

	GP	W	L	SL	PTS	GF	GA	GD
x-Black Gold Rush	2	2	0	0	4	9	7	2
x-Edmonton WAM!	2	1	1	0	2	10	8	2
Manitoba Intact	2	0	2	0	0	8	12	-4

===== (3) Manitoba vs (4) Black Gold =====
11 March 2017
11:00am MST

Manitoba Intact (0-1)	4–5 (2-1, 0-1, 2-3, 0-0)	Black Gold Rush (1-0)
Biebrick 4:31(1st), 5:39(1st); Stojak 1:25(3rd), 5:29(3rd)		Denesiuk 7:54(1st), 12:52(1st), 9:58(3rd); Chorney 9:13(3rd), 11:39(3rd)

Winsport Arena, Calgary, Alberta
Attendance: 98
Referee: Lori-Anne Kindopp, Chad Weatherall

===== (2) Edmonton vs (4) Black Gold =====
11 March 2017
7:00pm MST

Edmonton WAM! (0-1)	3–4 (1-3, 1-1, 0-0, 1-0)	Black Gold Rush (2-0)
Caine 7:01(1st); Holliday 8:09(2nd); Bell 4:26(4th, PP)		Henderson 3:59(1st); Denesiuk 5:12(1st); Chorney 11:02(1st, PP); Shmyr 12:53(2nd)

Shouldice Arena, Calgary, Alberta
Attendance: 79
Referee: Chad Weatherall, Jaimie Nelson

===== (2) Edmonton vs (3) Manitoba =====
12 March 2017
8:15am MDT

Edmonton WAM! (1-1)	7–4 (1-2, 0-2, 2-0, 4-0)	Manitoba Intact (0-2)
Holliday 4:07(1st, SH); Bell, J. 5:14(3rd); Caine 6:21(3rd); Kuczkowski 1:03(4th); Gillespie 1:20(4th); Debaji 5:59(4th); Bell, D. 12:58(4th, SH)		Biebrick 0:29(1st), 2:42(2nd, PP), 6:10(2nd); Pacholek 1:19(1st)

Winsport Arena, Calgary, Alberta
Attendance: 88
Referee: Jaimie Nelson, Lori-Anne Kindopp

==== (2) Edmonton vs (4) Black Gold ====
12 March 2017
12:00pm MDT

Edmonton WAM!	4–0 (2-0, 0-0, 2-0, 0-0)	Black Gold Rush
Dreger 4:47(1st, PP); Debaji 10:12(1st, PP); Bell 0:30(3rd); Caine 4:15(3rd)

Cochrane Arena, Cochrane, Alberta
Attendance: 200
Referee: Iris Todd, Jaimie Nelson

== Elite Eight ==
- x indicates clinches semifinal.
- y indicates clinches final directly.
- t indicates to play tiebreaker.

All games will play at Leduc Recreation Centre which located at Leduc, Alberta and Ken Nichol Regional Recreation Centre which located at Beaumont, Alberta from March 27 to March 31.

	GP	W	L	OTL	PTS	GF	GA
y-Atlantic Attack	7	6	0	1	12	51	35
x-Cambridge Turbos	7	6	0	1	12	49	35
t-Waterloo Wildfire	7	5	2	0	10	38	31
t-Richmond Hill Lighting	7	5	2	0	10	36	30
Edmonton WAM!	7	3	3	1	6	40	36
Calgary RATH	7	2	5	0	4	34	37
Ottawa Ice	7	1	6	0	2	35	52
Black Gold Rush	7	0	7	0	0	13	40

=== Tiebreaker ===
"Mini-game" The match is played until one team leads in the period. In each period the time is 10 minutes and both teams need to play for full 10 minutes.

==== Waterloo vs Richmond Hill ====
31 March 2017
3:30pm MDT

Waterloo Wildfire	2–1 (1-1, 1-0)	Richmond Hill Lighting
Youldon 1st(3:39), 2nd(9:44, PP)		Richardson 1st(6:26, PP)

Leduc Recreation Centre, Leduc, Alberta
Referee: Benoit Ducharme, Mandy Avery

Waterloo wins the match and advances to the semifinal

== Semifinal ==
31 March 2017
7:30pm MDT

Cambridge Turbos	6–2 (1-1, 1-1, 3-0, 1-0)	Waterloo Wildfire
Wouters 1st(6:10), 3rd(6:56); Nosal, P. 2nd(8:00), 3rd(1:44); Adams 3rd(7:27); Jasper 4th(0:26, PP)		Kelly 1st(7:07, PP); Hutchings 2nd(11:59)

Leduc Recreation Centre, Leduc, Alberta

Cambridge goes to the final

== Final ==
1 April 2017
1:30pm MDT

Atlantic Attack	5–6 (2-3, 1-0, 1-0, 1-3)	Cambridge Turbos
Proulx 1st(0:30), 2nd(6:08), 4th(4:25, PP); LeBlanc 1st(2:18); Snowdon 3rd(4:28)		Nosal, S. 1st(11:07), 4th(7:42), 4th(8:45, PP); Nosal, P. 1st(8:28), 4th(7:22); Wouters 1st(2:35)

Leduc Recreation Centre, Leduc, Alberta

=== Roster ===
Cambridge Turbos

- Findlay, Melissa
- Campbell, Taylor
- Wouters, Sharolyn
- Gaudet, Jennifer
- Dupuis, Jenna
- Granger, Sydney
- Adams, Sheri
- Nosal, Paige
- Starzynski, Hannah
- McCullough, Samantha
- Jasper, Elyssa
- Nosal, Sydney
- Callander, Jessie (goalie)

Atlantic Attack

- Cormier, Sabrina
- Mason, Kirsti
- Hollis, Ashley
- Snowdon, Jessica
- Richard, Renee
- Melanson, Kim
- Mills, Natasha
- Cormier, Isabelle
- Doiron, Josee
- Snowdon, Jenny
- Landry, Jocelyne
- Proulx, Joelle
- LeBlanc, Dominik
- Caissie, Martine
- Gallaway, Kait
- Proulx, Miguelle
- Doiron, Karine (goalie)

== Leaders ==
- Player except goalie
  - Goal
    - East: Martine Caissie (20, ATL)
    - West: Dailyn Bell (13, EDM)
  - Assist
    - East: Paige Nosal (16, CAM)
    - West: Jamie Bell (15, EDM)
  - Point
    - East: Martine Caissie (33, ATL)
    - West: Dailyn Bell (22, EDM)
- Goalie
  - Saving %
    - East Danni Walser (.915, CAM)
    - West Lauryn Girard (.898, BGR)
  - Goals against average
    - East Nathalie Poirier (3.11, ATL)
    - West Breanna Beck (2.88, EDM)
  - Win
    - East Emily Ferguson (8, WAT)
    - West Breanna Beck (4, EDM)
