= 2014 National Ringette League playoffs =

The 2014 National Ringette League Playoffs were the postseason tournament of 2013-14 National Ringette League season. Ottawa Ice defeated the Cambridge Turbos to win the first title.

== Format ==
Top two teams in East and West clinch the Elit Eight directly and third place to tenth place team clinch the knockout stage. (this year, red division champion was Montreal Mission and it is at third since for the fair game, Montreal clinch the Elite Eight directly.) The knock out stage is best-of-three and 3 vs 10, 4 vs 9, 5 vs 8 and 6 vs 7. The winner of knockout stage go to the Elite Eight.

In Elite Eight, eight teams play a game against rest of the team and the top team clinch the final. The second and third place team clinch the semifinal.

The semifinal winner goes to the final and the winner of the final is this year's champion.

== Knockout stage ==
=== (3) Ottawa vs (10) Lac St.Louis ===
Game 1

15 March 2014

Ottawa Ice	10-4 (5-1, 2-0, 2–2, 1–1)	Lac St.Louis Adrenaline
Hartley 2:31(1st), 4:57(1st), 12:19(4th, PP); Simzer 1:41(1st), 11:09(3rd); MacDonald 8:24(1st), 2:09(2nd); Bateman 10:16(1st), 3:32(3rd); McBride 8:39(2nd)		Keeble 0:11(1st), 10:12(4th); Groulx 0:31(3rd, PP); Ipperciel 9:42(3rd)

Bell SensPlex, Kanata, Ontario
Attendance: 50
Referee: Natalie Fortin, Emmanuelle Bourbeau

Ottawa leads the series 1-0

Game 2

15 March 2014

Lac St.Louis Adrenaline	3-11 (0-4, 0-2, 3-2, 0-3)	Ottawa Ice
Groulx 7:22(3rd), 12:10(3rd); Lecours Boucher 5:05(3rd)		Bateman 0:19(1st), 12:16(1st), 0:42(3rd); Lugg, K. 3:40(1st), 6:35(4th, SH); Simzer 11:08(2nd), 12:29(2nd); Love, J. 10:15(1st); Love, K. 4:00(3rd); Lugg, C. 9:57(4th, PP); Hartley 10:47(4th)

Walter Baker Arena, Nepean, Ontario
Attendance: 63
Referee: Mathieu Leduc, Mario Periard

Ottawa wins the series 2-0

=== (4) Richmond Hill vs (9) Rive Sud ===
Game 1

15 March 2014

Richmond Hill Lighting	10-1 (2-0, 1–1, 3-0, 4-0)	Rive Sud Revolution
Simone 5:14(1st), 2:12(3rd), 3:57(4th); Bakker 6:56(3rd), 0:59(4th); Jones 0:55(1st); Davies 11:44(2nd); Nosal 3:21(3rd); Hodgson 0:17(4th, SH); Thompson 9:49(4th, PP)		Tauvette 0:56(2nd)

Tom Graham Arena, Richmond Hill, Ontario
Attendance: 62
Referee: Amy Murray, Lorie Grant

Richmond Hill leads the series 1-0

Game 2

15 March 2014

Rive Sud Revolution	0-12 (0-2, 0-5, 0-1, 0-4)	Richmond Hill Lighting
		Bakker 3:19(1st, PP), 2:28(2nd), 7:17(2nd), 11:19(4th); Nosal 3:35(2nd), 4:07(2nd), 4:57(4th, PP); Simone 7:19(1st), 7:02(4th, PP); Jones 9:43(2nd); Thompson 12:08(3rd); Musetti (Nosal) 10:10(4th, PP)

Elvis Stojko Arena, Richmond Hill, Ontario
Attendance: 0
Referee: Amy Murray, Robert Drury

Richmond Hill wins the series 2-0

=== (5) Gloucester vs (8) Gatineau ===
Game 1

15 March 2014

Gloucester Devils	5-4 (2-1, 1–1, 1–1, 1–1)	Gatineau Fusion
Gabel 1:00(1st), 3:14(1st); Youldon 5:33(2nd), 3:49(4th, PP); McGonigal 6:33(3rd)		Lavergne 10:17(1st), 1:08(3rd); St-Laurent 3:12 (2nd, PP), 11:04(4th, PP)

Bob MacQuarrie Recreation Complex, Orleans, Ontario
Attendance: 65
Referee: Mario Periard, Mathieu Leduc

Gloucester leads the series 1-0

Game 2

15 March 2014

Gatineau Fusion	5-4 (2-3, 2-0, 1-0, 0-1)	Gloucester Devils
St-Laurent 4:04(1st), 1:54(2nd), 10:05(3rd); Levergne 9:54(1st, PP), 2:33(2nd)		Gabel 3:21(1st, PP); Lewis 4:18(1st); Youldon 8:12(1st); McGonigal 5:52(4th)

Bob MacQuarrie Recreation Complex, Orleans, Ontario
Attendance: 70
Referee: Natalie Fortin, Emmanuelle Bourbeau

The series ties 1-1

Game 3

16 March 2014

Gloucester Devils	4-3 (1–1, 2-1, 0–0, 1–1)	Gatineau Fusion
McGonigal 1:28(1st), 8:41(2nd, PP); Gabel 11:21(2nd, PP); Biewald 7:37(4th)		Octeau 0:58(1st); St-Laurent 11:44(2nd, SH); Bock-Laurin 11:39(4th)

Fred Barrett Arena, Ottawa, Ontario
Attendance: 67
Referee: Natalie Fortin, Emmanuelle Bourbeau

Gloucester wins the series 2-1

=== (6) Waterloo vs (7) Bourassa ===
Game 1

15 March 2014

Waterloo Wildfire	4-2 (1-2, 0–0, 2-0, 1-0)	Le Royal de Bourassa
Scott 5:50(1st), 4:01(3rd), 10:06(4th); Kelly 11:17(3rd, PP)		Berthelet 1:31(1st, PP); Demers 6:54(1st)

St. Clements Arena, St. Clements, Ontario
Attendance: 50
Referee: Chris Faulds, Robert Drury

Waterloo leads the series 1-0

Game 2

15 March 2014

Le Royal de Bourassa	4-2 (1–1, 1-0, 0–0, 2-1)	Waterloo Wildfire
Demers 3:40(1st); Daraîche 10:55(2nd); Lacharite 6:06(4th); Berthelet 9:38(4th)		Kelly 7:01(1st); Scott 2:49(4th)

RIM Park, Waterloo, Ontario
Attendance: 100
Referee: Brent Bunting, Lorie Grant

The series ties 1-1

Game 3

16 March 2014

Waterloo Wildfire	7-5 (3-2, 1-0, 2–2, 1–1)	Le Royal de Bourassa
Vivian 6:36(1st), 8:53(1st); Wilson 4:10(3rd), 11:48(4th, PP); Scott, J. 3:02(1st); Scott, R. 7:52(2nd); Kowalsky 12:31(3rd)		Daraîche 0:19(1st), 4:58(1st, PP); Lacharite 2:37(3rd), 8:10(4th); Demers 12:57(3rd)

Albert McCormick Arena, Waterloo, Ontario
Attendance: 75
Referee: Lorie Grant, Robert Drury

Waterloo wins the series 2-1

== Elite Eight ==
All games were played at Cooperators Centre, Regina, Saskatchewan from April 7 to 11.

- x indicates clinches the Semifinal.
- y indicates clinches the Final directly.

	GP	W	L	OTL	PTS
y-Cambridge Turbos	7	6	1	0	12
x-Ottawa Ice	7	5	2	0	10
x-Edmonton WAM!	7	5	2	0	10
Richmond Hill Lighting	7	4	3	0	8
Calgary RATH	7	3	4	0	6
Montreal Mission	7	3	4	0	6
Gloucester Devils	7	1	6	0	2
Waterloo Wildfire	7	1	5	1	2

== Semifinal ==
Ottawa vs Edmonton

11 April 2014

Ottawa Ice	3-2 (1-0, 1–1, 1–1, 0–0)	Edmonton WAM!
Simzer 6:21(1st, PP); Love 0:25(2nd); Lugg 12:10(3rd, PP)		Bell 12:36(2nd, PP), 12:21(3rd)

Co-operator Center, Regina, Saskatchewan
Attendance: 0
Referee: Jaimie Nelson, Karen Meek

Ottawa wins the game and goes to the Final.

== Final ==
Cambridge vs Ottawa

12 April 2014

Cambridge Turbos	4-7 (1–1, 1-2, 2-0, 0-4)	Ottawa Ice
Gaudet, Je. 12:55(1st, PP), 7:40(2nd); Gaudet, Ja. 5:37(3rd, PP), 12:51(3rd, PP)		Bateman 6:19(1st), 0:51(4th, SH), 12:11(4th, EN/SH); Simzer 5:45(2nd), 8:06(4th), 12:42(4th, EN/SH); Hartley 6:15(2nd)

Co-operator Center, Regina, Saskatchewan
Attendance: 0
Referee: Natalie Fortin, Robert Drury

=== Roster ===
Ottawa

- Simzer, Jayme
- McBride, Jenna
- Love, Kyrie
- Côté, Natasha
- Laviolette, Emilie
- Bateman, Alex
- Gross, Sarah
- MacDonald, Brittany
- Goguen, Sophie
- Lugg, Katie
- Hartley, Jennifer
- Laframboise, Chloe
- Fougere, Elsa
- Lugg, Carrie
- Love, Jenna
- Goble, Tori (goalie)

Cambridge

- Findlay, Melissa
- Campbell, Taylor
- Albert, Kayla
- Gaudet, Jennifer
- Hinde, Megan
- Dupuis, Jenna
- Hannesson, Kacy
- Granger, Sydney
- Purbrick, Jessica
- Richards, Stacey
- Walden, Brittany
- Walden, Jessica
- Gaudet, Jacqueline
- Barey, Nadia
- McCullough, Samantha
- Jasper, Elyssa
- Pittaway, Meghan (goalie)

== Leaders ==
- Player except goalie
  - Goal
    - East: Josie Scott (19, WAT)
    - West: Jamie Bell (16, EDM)
  - Assist
    - East: Katie Lugg (16, OTT)
    - West: Dailyn Bell (18, EDM)
  - Point
    - East: Emily Bakker (31, RH)
    - West: Dailyn Bell (33, EDM)
- Goalie
  - Saving %
    - East Meghan Pittaway (.926, CAM)
    - West Breanna Beck (.894, EDM)
  - Goals against average
    - East Meghan Pittaway (2.86, CAM)
    - West Breanna Beck (5.27, EDM)
  - Win
    - East Meghan Pittaway (6, CAM)
    - West Anj Grewal, Bobbi Mattson (both are 3, EDM and CGY respectively)
