= Manitoba Herd =

National Ringette League team in Winnipeg, Manitoba

- City: Winnipeg, Manitoba
- League: National Ringette League
- Conference: Western
- Founded: 2016
- Colours
- Head coach: Andrea Ferguson
- Website: nationalringetteleague.ca/MHerd

Previous franchise history
- Manitoba Intact (2016–2021)

Championships
- Best finish: 6th (2021)

The Manitoba Herd is a ringette team in the National Ringette League's (NRL) Western Conference. The team is based in Winnipeg, Manitoba. The team was previously called the Manitoba Intact.

== Team history ==
The Herd were founded in 2016 as the Manitoba Intact. They took their name from a corporate sponsor that made a Manitoba team's return to the NRL possible after the province's previous entry folded in 2013 due to financial difficulties. Winnipeg-based teams had a longer history with the NRL, but were hampered by the league's demanding travel. The Winnipeg Prairie Fire had been an on-ice success, finishing in second place in the Canadian Ringette Championships in what would be their final season in 2013. For several years the province also hosted a second NRL team, the Manitoba Jets. Those teams made an effort to host games in other areas of the province, such as Steinbach, which hosted a series between the Prairie Fire and Edmonton WAM! in 2013. The establishment of the Intact, then, filled a significant gap for the National Ringette League. In 2021, the team rebranded as the Manitoba Herd, a name that had been used informally in the past to reference Manitoba's ringette squads at the Canada Games.

Manitoba hosted the 2018 Canadian Ringette Championships, which includes the NRL playoffs, in Winnipeg. Manitoba won its opening series against the BC Thunder to advance to the Elite Eight, but did not manage to win another game and finished in 8th place. Manitoba again defeated the Thunder in a knockout series in 2019, and ultimately finished in 7th at the national championships. The 2020 and 2021 championships were ultimately cancelled due to the COVID-19 pandemic.

After play resumed in 2022, the team put added emphasis on growing the game locally and saw larger crowds supporting the team. In 2022, Herd player Belle Paisley was named to the Canadian junior national team ahead of the World Ringette Championships, where Canada won silver.

The Herd's current head coach is Andrea Ferguson, who was inducted into the Manitoba Sports Hall of Fame in 2022 for her contributions to ringette. Ferguson is a former national junior champion and captain of the Prairie Fire who also won the player-of-the-year award in the Finnish Elite League in 2003.

== Mascot ==
In 2016 the Manitoba Intact, the precursor to the Manitoba Herd, acquired a mascot, a Bison named "Mani".

== Season-by-season ==
Season	League	Conference	GP	W	L	OTW	OTL	Pts	GF	GA
2021–22	NRL	Western	19	10	8	1	0	20	104	102
2022–23	NRL	Western	24	8	15	0	1	16	130	149

== Rosters ==
=== Current roster ===
2022–23 Manitoba Herd
#	Player	Position
4	Kaylee Spearing	
6	Josée Roy	
9	Kelsey Gillan	
15	Mikayla Pacholek	
16	Nicole Girardin	
19	Belle Paisley	
22	Samantha Renooy	
24	Raeanne Wysocki	
29	Caroline Girardin	
32	Kiana Heska	Goalie
52	Brett Van Nieuw Amerongen	
63	Karlee Jansen	
65	Sam Heinemann	
66	Taylor Hildebrand	
71	Janelle Wotherspoon	
81	Alexsi Kavvadas	
86	Nicole Desrosiers	
