= Seven Oaks Sportsplex =

Sports complex in Winnipeg, Manitoba

Coordinates: 49.9473°N 97.1388°W

- Interactive map of Seven Oaks Sportsplex
- Former names: Garden City Soccer Complex
- Location: 725 Kingsbury Avenue; Winnipeg, Manitoba, Canada
- Owner: City of Winnipeg
- Operator: Garden City Community Centre

Tenants
- Soccer; Winnipeg Alliance FC (CMISL) 2009-11; Ice hockey Raiders Jr Hockey Club (MMJHL) 2016-present South East Prairie Thunder (Sr.AAA) 2017-present

Website
- www.gardencitycc.com

The Seven Oaks Sportsplex is an indoor ice hockey and soccer complex in Winnipeg, Manitoba, Canada. The complex consists of the Seven Oaks Arena and the Seven Oaks Soccer Complex (formerly Garden City Soccer Complex). It is located on the grounds of the Garden City Community Centre, immediately east of the Garden City Shopping Centre, in the Garden City area.

== Facilities ==
=== Soccer Complex ===
Prior to a major expansion in 2014–15, the Garden City Soccer Complex (as it was then known) underwent a $20-million expansion as part of a new joint venture between the community centre and the Winnipeg Soccer Federation. The new Soccerplex opened in 2015 and was used as a training facility for the 2015 FIFA Women's World Cup.

=== Arena ===
The Seven Oaks Arena is an ice hockey facility that opened in 2015. It was constructed at a cost of $18 million under a cost-sharing agreement between the City of Winnipeg, the provincial government, and the community centre. Following the opening of Seven Oaks Arena, the city closed the obsolete Old Exhibition and Vimy Arenas.

The arena has two National Hockey League-size rinks, each with seating for 350 spectators. It is mainly used by local minor hockey teams and for private sports clinics. The arena is also home to the Raiders Junior Hockey Club of the Manitoba Major Junior Hockey League. The arena has also played host to the Manitoba Junior Hockey League's annual showcase in 2018 and 2019.
