= Bourassa Royal =

National Ringette League team in Bourassa, Laval, and Lanaudière, Quebec

Le Royal de Bourassa
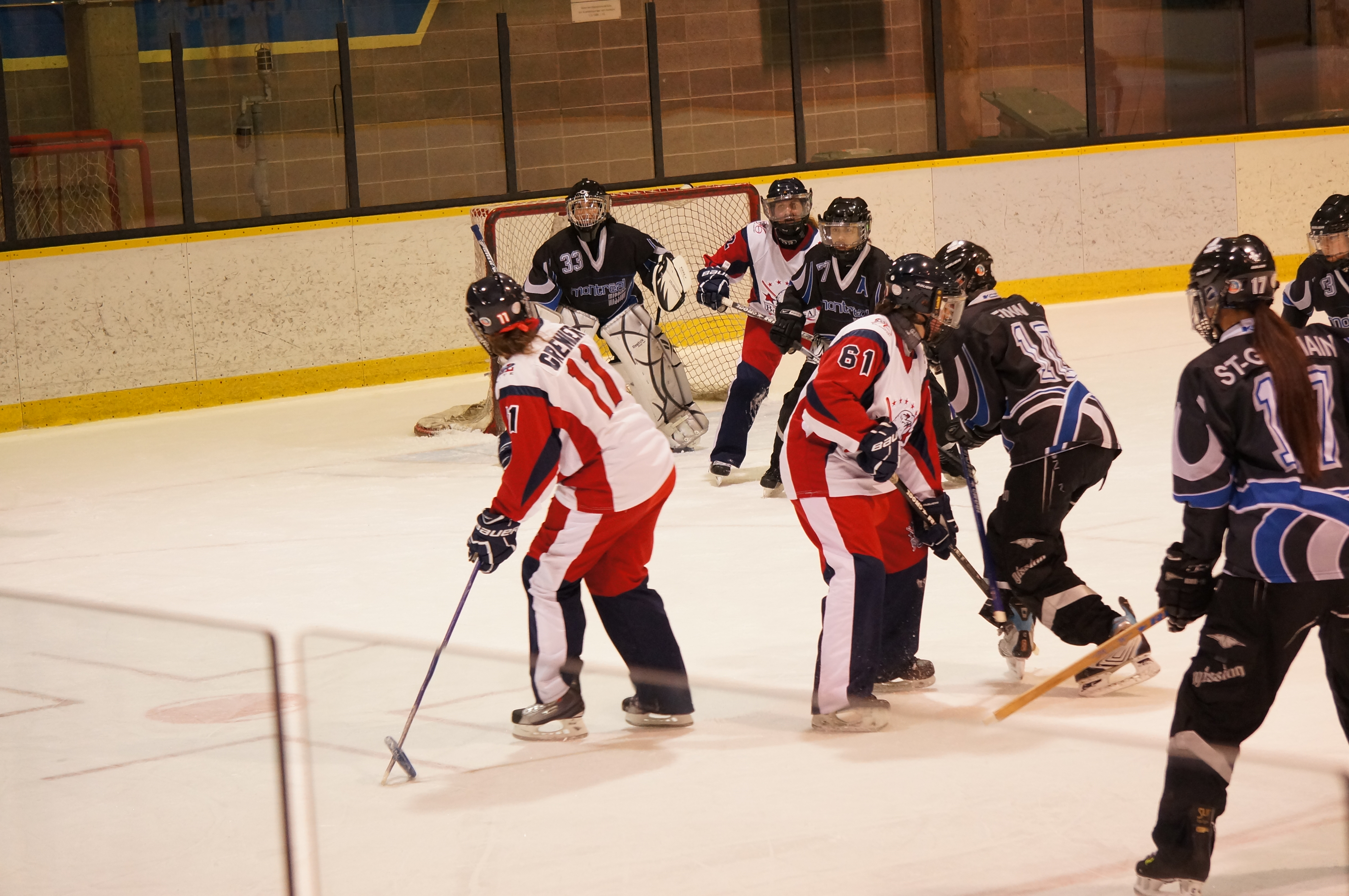
- Nickname: Bourassa Royal
- City: (Quebec) Bourassa-Laval-Lanaudière
- League: National Ringette League
- Conference: Eastern
- Division: White
- Founded: 2004; 22 years ago
- Folded: 2021
- Colours: Blue, Red, White
- Head coach: Yves Leclair
- Website: NRL.ca

Franchise history
- 2004 to 2011: BLL Nordiques (Bourassa-Laval-Lanaudière)
- 2011–present: Bourassa Royal

The Bourassa Royal or Le Royal de Bourassa (previously the BLL Nordiques, "Bourassa-Laval-Lanaudière") is a Canadian ringette team in Canada's National Ringette League (NRL) which competes in the Eastern Conference in the White division. Founded in 2004 and based in Quebec, the team recruits players from Bourassa-Laval-Lanaudière. The team has been inactive in the recent years of the NRL.

From its inaugural season in 2004 until the 2011–12 season, the team was called the BLL Nordiques after which it became "Bourassa Royal".

== Team history ==
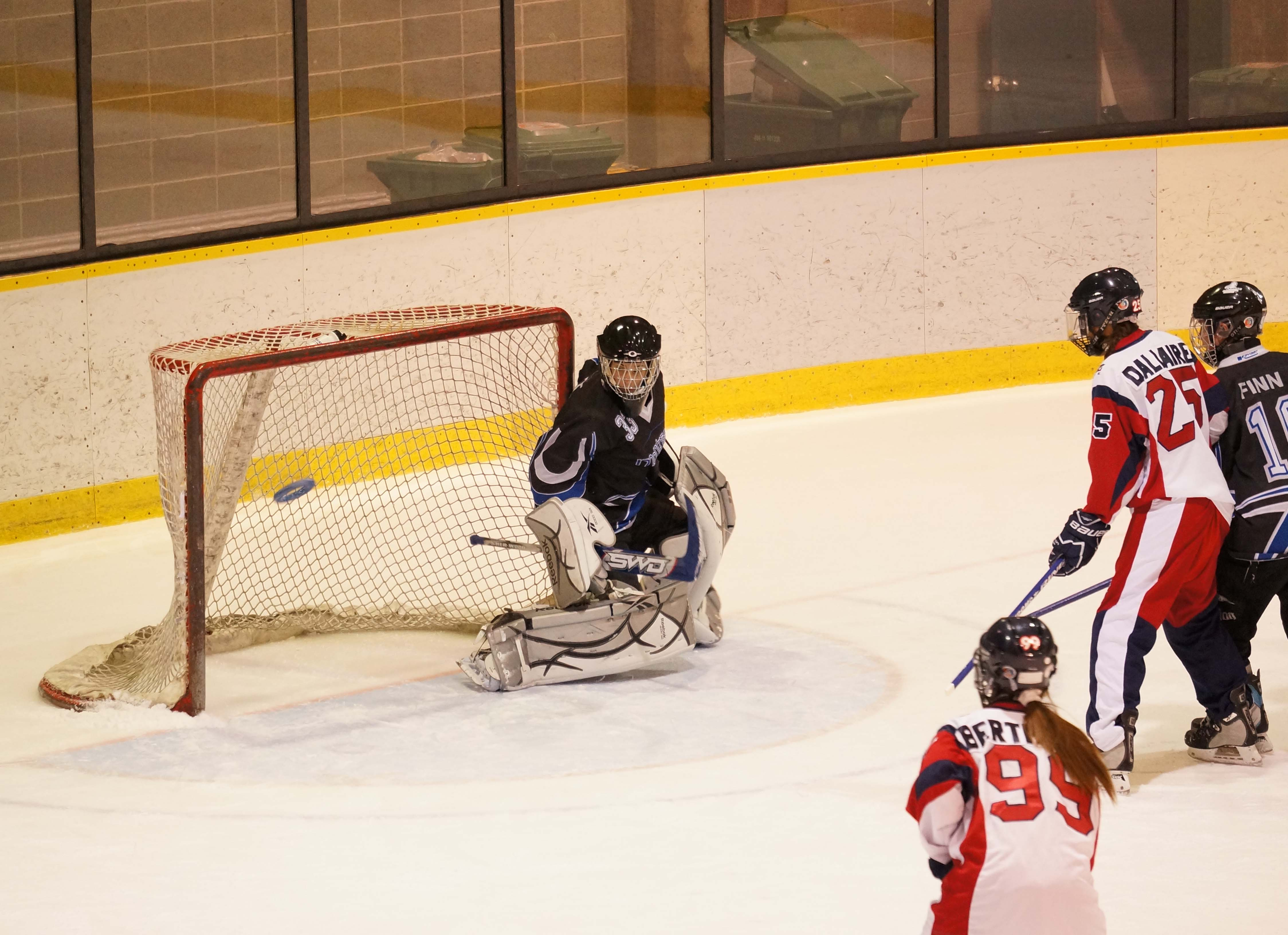
Bourassa Royal score a goal

The Bourassa Royal have played in the National Ringette League since its formation in 2004. For several years, the name of the team was BLL Nordiques. BLL is the acronym for Bourassa-Laval-Lanaudière area in Quebec.

For the 2011-12 season, the BLL Nordiques team became renamed, Bourassa Royal (short for Le Royal de Bourassa). Reasons cited were recent changes in the BLL (Bourassa/Laval/Lanaudière) region. As a consequence, the BLL Nordiques were transferred to the local association of Bourassa, which was considered a move that would allow players to have better training opportunities.

== 2011-12 NRL Season ==
=== 2011-12 Roster ===
2011-12 Bourassa Royal
Nat	No	Player	Pos	S/G	Age	Birthplace
(Quebec)	11	Isabelle Grenier	F	L	26	Terrebonne, QC
(Quebec)	25	Karyna Dallaire	C	L	22	Laval, QC
(Quebec)	45	Sarah-Maude Boucher	F	L	19	Brossard, QC
(Quebec)	46	Jessica Pepper	F	L	21	Laval, QC
(Quebec)	50	Geneviève Pepper	C	L	-	Laval, QC
(Quebec)	61	Sheila Larocque	F	R	20	Ste-Marthe-Sur-Le-Lac, QC
(Quebec)	66	Mélanie Leclair	F	L	26	Repentigny, QC
(Quebec)	77	Joanie Lafond-Beaumier	C	L	21	Laval, QC
(Quebec)	80	Nadia Chenard	C	L	33	Pierrefonds, QC
(Quebec)	22	Joannie Welman	D	L	26	Mirabel, QC
(Quebec)	44	Carolyne Laroche	D	R	26	Terrebonne, QC
(Quebec)	60	Megan Satterley	D	L	25	Beaconsfield, QC
(Quebec)	88	Austin Lancaster	D	R	24	Pierrefonds, QC
(Quebec)	93	Carolane Krutzfeldt Duplessis	D	R	20	Laval, QC
(Quebec)	99	Anick Gauthier	D	L	27	Blainville, QC
(Quebec)	1	Marie-Hélène Belzile	G	R	34	Saint-Bruno, QC
(Quebec)	0	Véronique Simard	G	R	29	Brossard, QC
(Quebec)	30	Mélissa Marier	G	R	20	Saint-Bruno, QC

=== 2011-12 Coaching staff ===
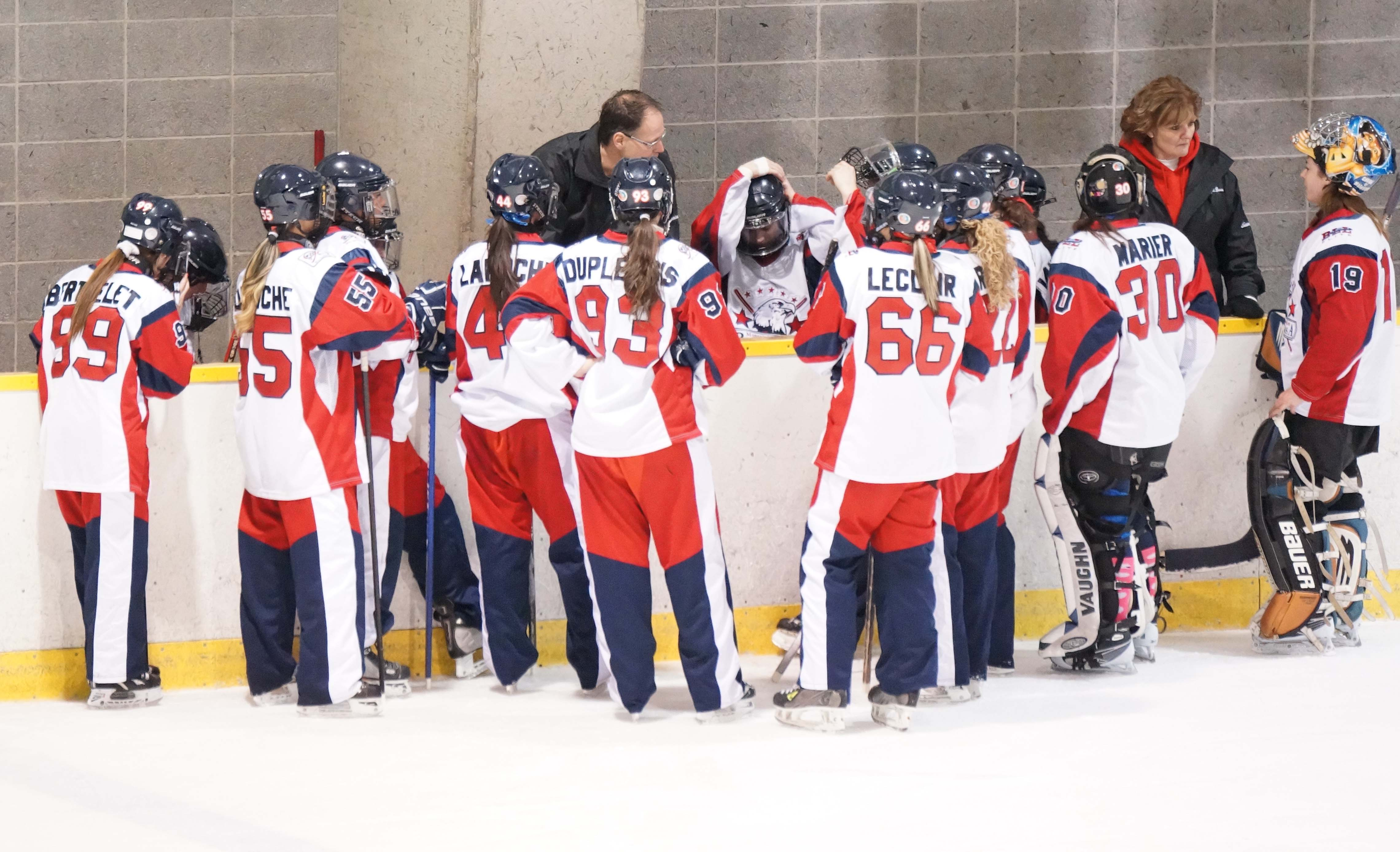
2012 team gathering around the bench discussing strategy with the Head Coach

- Head Coach: Yves Leclair
- Assistant Coach: Alain Berthelet
- Assistant Coach: Audrey Dalton
- Media Relations: Mélanie Leclair

== Other teams ==
The Bourassa Royal has competed against a number of other NRL teams including the Cambridge Turbos, Montreal Mission, Calgary RATH, Rive-Sud Révolution, and the Atlantic Attack.

== See also ==
- Ringette
- National Ringette League
- Cambridge Turbos
- Atlantic Attack
- Montreal Mission
- Calgary RATH
- Rive-Sud Révolution
