= BC Thunder =

National ringette sports team in Richmond, British Columbia

- City: Port Coquitlam, British Columbia
- League: National Ringette League
- Conference: Western
- Founded: 2011
- Colours
- Head coach: Troy Takasaki
- Website: bcthundernrl2022-23

Previous franchise history
- Lower Mainland Thunder (2011–12)

Championships
- NRL Titles: 1 (2012)

The BC Thunder is a ringette team in the National Ringette League's (NRL) Western Conference. The team is based in Port Coquitlam, British Columbia, and plays at the Port Coquitlam Community Centre.

== Team history ==
The BC Thunder, colloquially referred to as "the Thunder", were founded as the Lower Mainland Ringette League Thunder (LMRL Thunder) in 2011, and joined the NRL that year. The league took over operating the Fraser Valley Avalanche when private owner Bill Bettles ceased operations. The team was then run by the Lower Mainland Ringette League, a league based in Burnaby, and the Thunder practiced and played throughout the Vancouver area. As a result of the work the Fraser Valley Avalanche did in recruitment, the Thunder's first season was highly successful. The team competed in the NRL's Western Conference along with teams in Alberta, Saskatchewan, and Manitoba. Led by Jennifer (Gaudet) Wakefield, a veteran who joined the team from the Cambridge Turbos, and Finnish imports Heidi Petrell and NRL scoring champion Salla Kyhälä, the Thunder won 22 games and finished second in the conference. The 2012 Canadian Ringette Championships were being hosted in Burnaby, BC, which gave the Thunder the opportunity to compete for the national championship in front of home crowds. The Thunder entered the tournament ranked seventh in the nation. At the tournament, the Thunder started out 2–3 and needed to defeat the Turbos in a sudden-death tie-breaker to advance; they won and went on to face the undefeated Montréal Mission in the championship final. The Thunder won the final 7–2 to claim British Columbia's first national ringette title. Kyhala scored four times in the final and was named the tournament's most-valuable-player. Wakefield and Melanie Thomas joined Kyhala as Thunder players named to the tournament all-star team.

In December, 2012, part way through the 2011–12 season, the team found a new home in Richmond, with Richmond Ringette Association taking over management of the team, and re-branded itself as the BC Thunder to better reflect its status as a provincial team. While based in Richmond, the team continued to play some of its games in other arenas around Greater Vancouver, including Delta and Port Coquitlam. The team narrowly missed out on a medal when defending their national title at the 2013 Canadian Championships, finishing in fourth place.

The Thunder paused operations ahead of the 2013–14 season in order to restructure and stabilize its ownership. Former coach Dale Hannesson took over as the team's owner, and the Thunder rejoined the NRL for the 2014–15 season.

In 2018, Troy Takasaki took over as head coach after leading Richmond's under-19 team to a gold medal at the 2018 Western Canadian Championships.

Burnaby hosted the 2019 World Ringette Championships. Thunder goaltender Kiana Keska was named to Canada's national junior team, which went on to win the gold medal.

The Thunder paused operations for the 2020–21 and 2021–22 seasons due to the challenges of the COVID-19 pandemic. The team returned to the NRL for the 2022–23 season, and finished third in the Western Conference with a 8-10 record.

In 2024, the Thunder played their home hub games at the Richmond Ice Centre, before moving to Port Coquitlam for the 25-26 season, which has been their home arena for the past two seasons.

BC finished in 2nd in the West in the 2025-26 season, with a 17-7 record. After defeating Rive-Sud in the semi-finals, they faced Waterloo in the final. The Wildfire proved too strong, taking a 3 goal lead before the Thunder could score 1. Another flurry of Waterloo goals at the tail end of the final resulted in a 6-1 win for the Ontarians.

Goaltender Sarah Macdonald, who was named the top goaltender in the 25-26 season and played for the Canadian Senior National Team, is not part of the Thunder's roster for the 2026-27 season.

== Season-by-season ==
Season	League	Conference	GP	W	L	T	OTW	OTL	Pts	GF	GA
2020–21	NRL	Western	Did not play due to COVID-19 pandemic								
2021–22	NRL	Western	Did not play due to COVID-19 pandemic								
2022–23	NRL	Western	18	8	10	0	0	0	24	97	114
2023-24	NRL	Western	19	12	6	1	2	0	35	90	78
2024-25	NRL	Western	20	14	6	0	6	0	36	78	75
2025-26	NRL	Western	24	17	7	0	0	3	54	142	76

== Rosters ==
=== Current roster ===
2026-27 BC Thunder
#	Name	Position
2	Mikayla Williams	F
3	Macey Cyrenne	F
4	Grace Kemp	D
5	Danika Ewen	D
6	Molly Chorney	F
7	Madeline Bechard	D
8	Kate Rogers-Horne	D
9	Kira Hodge	D
10	Robyn Gillespie-Janze	D
11	Kacy Hanneson	C
12	Adaya Townsend	F
13	Jessica Murphy	D
14	Hailey Takasaki	C
15	Isabelle Beech	F
22	Marissa Dyck	D
23	Nerissa Beeby	D
26	Sidney Crowe	F
32	Halle Quenneville	G
98	Callista Bizuk	G
