= Cambridge Turbos =

National Ringette League team in Cambridge, Ontario

- Nickname: Turbos
- City: Cambridge, Ontario
- League: National Ringette League
- Conference: Eastern
- Division: Red
- Founded: 2003
- Home arena: Hespeler Memorial Arena
- Colours
- Head coach: Scott Borland
- Media: Cambridge Times; Waterloo Region Record
- Website: cambridgeringette.ca
Home colours	Away colours

Championships
- NRL Titles: 6 (2006, 2008, 2009, 2015, 2016, 2017)
- Ringette World Club Championship: 1 (2008)

The Cambridge Turbos is a ringette team in the National Ringette League (NRL) competing in the Eastern Conference's Red Division. Founded in 2003, the is team based in Cambridge, Ontario. The Turbos home arena is the Hespeler Memorial Arena, a facility which is a twin sheet arena with two Olympic-sized sheets of ice.

== History ==
The team was founded in 2003 at the same time as the NRL was being established. The Turbos have played in the league since its inaugural season in 2003–04. The Turbos won their first national championship in the Open Division of the 2006 Canadian Ringette Championships (CRC).

Starting in 2008, the NRL had its own division at the annual CRC, with the winner being awarded the Jeanne Sauvé Memorial Cup as the senior national champion. The Turbos won back-to-back championships in 2008 and 2009, and became the first NRL team to win three consecutive championships, doing so from 2015 to 2017. The team lost only three times en route to the 2015 title. The Turbos came close to a fourth consecutive title in 2018, but settled for the bronze medal in 3rd place. With 6 national titles, the Turbos are the most successful NRL team. Cambridge also hosted the CRC in 2011. The Turbos won the inaugural Ringette World Club Championship in 2008 in Sault Ste. Marie, Ontario, defeating the Finnish club Luvia in the final by a score of 6–3. The Turbos also competed at the 2011 Club Championship.

Many members of the Turbos have played for Team Canada at the World Ringette Championships, including Tatum Allen, Katherine Shaughnessy, and Erika Neubrand most recently in 2022; Canada won the silver.

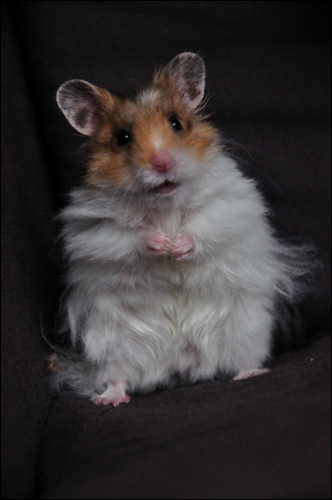
The Cambridge Turbos were named after a Turbos player's long-haired Syrian hamster named, "Turbo" (representative image only)

The team name pre-dates the Turbos NRL team, and originated with a Cambridge U-12 team in 1988. The name came from squad member Corina Harris' pet hamster, Turbo, who became the team's unofficial mascot. Soon, the Cambridge ringette program adopted the name for all of its teams, as did the senior Turbos as they entered the NRL. Harris' father, who coached the team, also started a "Turbo Charge" cheer, which has continued.

The Turbos were featured on an episode of the Rick Mercer Report in 2009 called "Ringette Night In Canada." The episode included coverage of a NRL game between the Turbos and the now-defunct Gloucester Devils.

== Regular season records ==
The Turbos currently competed in the Red Division of the NRL's Eastern Conference along with the Nepean Ravens, Waterloo Wildfire, and Gatineau Fusion. The Conference also has a White Division featuring the Montréal Mission, the Rive-Sud Révolution, and the Atlantic Attack. The Western Conference features six teams: the BC Thunder, Calgary RATH, Edmonton WAM!, Edmonton Black Gold, Saskatchewan Heat, and Manitoba Herd.

Season	GP	W	L	T	Pts	GF	GA	Standings
2019–20	Season cancelled due to COVID-19 pandemic							
2020–21	Season cancelled due to COVID-19 pandemic							
2021–22	18	11	7	0	20	109	83	4th
2022–23	26	6	20	0	12	136	175	12th

== Rosters ==
=== Current roster ===
The Cambridge Turbos compete in the 2022–23 NRL season.

(* = AP)

2022–23 Cambridge Turbos
Prov	#	Player	Pos
(Ontario)		Taylor Campbell	
(Ontario)		Christyn Oda	
(Ontario)		Madison Sunseth	
(Ontario)		Ayton Johnston	
(Ontario)		Katharine Shaughnessy	
(Ontario)		Sydney Nosal	
(Ontario)		Paige Lanteigne	
(Ontario)		Miranda Anderson	
(Ontario)		Sheri Adams	
(Ontario)		Kaitlyn McGillen	
(Ontario)		Avery Riley McKay	
(Ontario)		Erika Neubrand	
(Ontario)		Samantha Tracey	
(Ontario)		Melissa Breslin	
(Ontario)		Sarah Pedersen	
(Ontario)		*Rachel Bettke	
(Ontario)		*Jace Cormier	
(Ontario)		*Claire Lodge	

=== 2013–14 season roster ===
2013–14 Cambridge Turbos
Prov	No	Player	Pos	S/C	Age	Hometown
(Ontario)	1	Meghan Pittaway	G	L	25	Cambridge, ON
(Ontario)	3	Melissa Findlay	D	L	26	Oshawa, ON
(Ontario)	4	Taylor Campbell	F	L	19	Tillsonburg, ON
(Ontario)	7	Kayla Albert (DAP)	F	L	19	Cambridge, ON
(Ontario)	8	Jennifer Gaudet	C	R	33	Cambridge, ON
(Ontario)	9	Megan Hinde (DAP)	F	R	19	Paris, ON
(Ontario)	10	Jenna Dupuis	D	L	20	Whitby, ON
(British Columbia)	11	Kacy Hannesson	D	R	21	Langley, BC
(Ontario)	12	Sydney Granger	D	L	20	Dorchester, ON
(Ontario)	13	Kaitlyn Richardson (AP)	F	R	21	Guelph, ON
(Ontario)	14	Jessica Purbrick (DAP)	D	R	18	Cambridge, ON
(Ontario)	15	Stacey Richards	D	R	19	Mississauga, ON
(Ontario)	16	Brittany Walden	C	L	27	Kitchener, ON
(Ontario)	17	Jessica Walden	F	L	27	Kitchener, ON
(Ontario)	18	Jacqueline Gaudet	F	R	31	Cambridge, ON
(Ontario)	20	Abby Richardson (AP)	F	L	17	Guelph, ON
(Ontario)	22	Nadia Barey	F	R	23	Burlington, ON
(Ontario)	23	Samantha McCullough	F	L	19	Courtice, ON
(Ontario)	35	Jessie Callander	G	R	20	Mississauga, ON
(Ontario)	44	Elyssa Jasper	F	L	25	Ajax, ON

== See also ==
- Ringette Canada
