= Calgary RATH =

National Ringette League team in Alberta, Canada

- City: Calgary, Alberta
- League: National Ringette League
- Conference: Western
- Founded: 2007
- Colours
- Head coach: Barb Bautista
- Website: www.calgaryrath.com

Championships
- NRL Titles: 3 (2013, 2019, 2022)

The Calgary RATH is a ringette team in the National Ringette League's (NRL) Western Conference. The team is based in Calgary, Alberta.

== Team history ==
The RATH were founded in 2007, with the name serving as an acronym for the values of "respect, attitude, teamwork, and heart." They have been a consistently competitive team in the NRL and won bronze medals at the 2008 and 2011 national championships. The RATH won their first national title at the 2013 Canadian Ringette Championships in Fredericton, New Brunswick. They faced Manitoba's Prairie Fire in the championship final, and won in overtime by a score of 6–5 on a goal by Amelia Hradsky.

Calgary won its second national championship at the 2019 tournament, hosted on Prince Edward Island. The RATH defeated the defending champion Atlantic Attack in the final by a score of 5–3.

In January 2020, Calgary hosted the Esso Golden Ring Tournament, considered the world's largest ringette tournament. The RATH participated by playing a feature game against their NRL rivals, the Manitoba Intact.

The RATH looked like a favourite to defend their national title, posting a 21–1 record in 2019–20 before the national championships were cancelled due to the COVID-19 pandemic. The team ultimately had to wait until 2022 for the chance to defend their title after the 2021 national championships suffered the same fate. The team picked up where it left off in the 2021–22 season, posting an undefeated 20–0 record. Calgary hosted the 2022 National championship, giving the RATH the opportunity to defend the 2019 title on home ice. The RATH advanced to the national championship final against their rivals, the Edmonton WAM!, with a 5–2 win over the Cambridge Turbos in the semi-final. In the final, they defeated Edmonton 5–1 to win their third championship. The final also marked the last game for veterans Lindsey Geddes, Rachel Grant, and captain Shaundra Bruvall, who all retired at the conclusion of the season.

The RATH fell short of a third consecutive national championship, taking the bronze medal at the 2023 Canadian Championships in Regina. The RATH were presented with the Agnes Jacks True Sport award for best sportsmanship.

== Season-by-season ==
Season	League	Conference	GP	W	L	OTW	OTL	Pts	GF	GA
2021–22	NRL	Western	20	20	0	0	0	40	145	53
2022–23	NRL	Western	26	20	6	0	0	40	177	107

== Current roster ==
2022–23 Calgary RATH
#	Name	Position
2	Madison Galeski	F
5	Mikyla Brewster	F
6	Kaitlyn Youldon	C
7	Lauren Chown	F
8	Justine Exner	C
10	Erin Ung	F
11	Rachel Ung	D
13	Anne Sauve	F
14	Cayleigh Hasell	D
15	Gracie Brown	D
16	Marla Wheeler	D
18	Jasmine Bearss	F
20	Kennedy Rice	F
21	Jennica Murray	D
31	Jazmine Waldal	G
33	Breanna Beck	G
34	Rachael McKerracher	G

== Team Canada players ==
RATH players have competed for the Canada national ringette team at the World Ringette Championships (WRC) and are listed in the table below.

Year	Team	Player
2022	2022 Team Canada Junior	Erin Ung
2022	2022 Team Canada Junior	Mikyla Brewster
