= Edmonton WAM! =

National Ringette League team in Edmonton, Alberta

- Nickname: Wambits
- City: Edmonton, Alberta
- League: National Ringette League
- Conference: Western
- Founded: 2004
- Colours
- Head coach: Jennifer Krochak
- Website: wamringette.com

Championships
- NRL Titles: 5 (2007, 2010, 2011, 2023, 2024)

The Edmonton WAM! is a ringette team in the National Ringette League's (NRL) Western Conference. Based in Edmonton, Alberta, they are one of 3 NRL teams in the province, alongside the Edmonton Black Gold Rush, the Calgary RATH and Rocky Mountain Rage.

== Team history ==
The WAM! were founded in 2004, around the time the NRL — established in 2002 — was preparing for its inaugural season. It wasn’t until the 2007–08 season that a formal National Ringette League division was included in the annual Canadian Ringette Championships. However, the WAM! found early success, winning a national title while representing Alberta in the Open Division at the 2007 championships. The coach of the winning 2007 team was Lisa Brown, a member of the Ringette Canada Hall of Fame inducted in 2008 in the Athlete category. Brown was also a former player for the Canada National Ringette Team.

The team captured its first official NRL title at the 2010 Canadian Ringette Championships, held in Saskatoon. The WAM! avenged their 2009 gold medal loss by defeating the Cambridge Turbos 2–0 in the final, with goaltender Keely Brown earning a shutout. The two teams faced off in the final for a third consecutive year at the 2011 Championships, where Edmonton claimed its second straight national title with a 4–2 victory, highlighted by Brown’s 50-save performance.

The team remained competitive, including winning back-to-back bronze medals in 2014 and 2015. Jenna Debaji, Dailyn Bell and Jamie Bell were named to Team Canada for the 2016 World Ringette Championships, where the team won silver.

After the 2022 season, veteran Emily Lubbers retired from the team and became the head coach of the WAM!. Lubbers was an athlete on the team since 2011, winning two silver and two bronze medals at the Canadian Ringette Championships. In her first season as coach, Lubbers led the WAM! to a 22–4 record to finish atop the Western Conference. The team was a favourite ahead of the 2023 Canadian Championships in Regina, SK. There, the WAM! went undefeated to win their first national title since 2011. Gillian Dreger, Melissa Misutka, and Annie Debaji were all named to the tournament all-star team, while Misutka won Defence of the Year as well.

After the 2023-2024 regular season placed them third in the west the WAM! had a 5-2 record at the 2024 Canadian Ringette Championships in Dieppe, NB where they defeated the Calgary Rath 10-3 for a second consecutive national championship. Gillian Dreger, Annie Debaji, and Melissa Misutka were all named in the tournament all-star team. Dreger and Mistuka were nominated and selected as Center of the Year and Defence of the Year respectively.

== Season-by-season ==
Season	League	Conference	GP	W	L	OTW	OTL	Pts	GF	GA
2021–22	NRL	Western	20	14	6	2	1	28	117	85
2022–23	NRL	Western	26	22	4	1	0	44	170	100
2023-24	NRL	Western	25	15	7	0	1	47	131	107
2024-25	NRL	Western	27	23	4	1	0	70	180	101
2025-26	NRL	Western	24	23	1	3	0	66	170	78

== Rosters ==
=== Current roster ===
2025–26 Edmonton WAM!
#	Name	Position
1	Kaeli Woodliffe	G
2	Gillian Dreger	C
3	Annie Debaji	D
6	Dailyn Bell	D
7	Torrie Shennan	C
8	Olivia Hwang	D
9	Nina Tajbaksh	F
10	Lauren Henderson	F
11	Tayte Arlinghaus	F
12	Kirsten Krochak	F
13	Sydney Fevin	F
14	Kate Henderson	D
15	Jamie Ferri	D
16	Kaleigh Ryan-York	D
17	Vail Ketsa	F
18	Melissa Misutka	D
19	Erica Lee	D
95	Anjuman Grewal	G

== Team Canada players ==
WAM! players have competed for the Canada national ringette team at the World Ringette Championships (WRC) and are listed in the table below.

Year	Team	Player
2016	2016 Team Canada Senior	Dailyn Bell
2016	2016 Team Canada Senior	Jamie Bell
2016	2016 Team Canada Senior	Jenna Debaji
2016	2016 Team Canada Junior	Kelsie Caine
2016	2016 Team Canada Junior	Annie Debaji

Year	Team	Player
2017	2017 Team Canada Senior	Dailyn Bell
2017	2017 Team Canada Senior	Jamie Bell
2017	2017 Team Canada Senior	Lindsay Brown
2017	2017 Team Canada Junior	Gillian Dreger
2017	2017 Team Canada Junior	Torrie Shennan

Year	Team	Player
2019	2019 Team Canada Senior	Dailyn Bell
2019	2019 Team Canada Senior	Jamie Bell
2019	2019 Team Canada Senior	Annie Debaji
2019	2019 Team Canada Senior	Gillian Dreer
2019	2019 Team Canada Senior	Melissa Misutka
2019	2019 Team Canada Junior	Torrie Shennan

Year	Team	Player
2022	2022 Team Canada Senior	Gillian Dreger
2022	2022 Team Canada Senior	Melissa Misutka
2022	2022 Team Canada Senior	Nina Tajbaksh
2022	2022 Team Canada Senior	Torrie Shennan
2022	2022 Team Canada Junior	Vail Ketsa

Year	Team	Player
2023	2023 Team Canada Junior	Jazmyn Fevin
2023	2023 Team Canada Junior	Kaleigh Ryan-York

Year	Team	Player
2025	2025 Team Canada Senior	Dailyn Bell
2025	2025 Team Canada Senior	Gillian Dreger
2025	2025 Team Canada Senior	Annie Debaji
2025	2025 Team Canada Senior	Lauren Henderson
2025	2025 Team Canada Senior	Vail Ketsa
2025	2025 Team Canada Senior	Melissa Misutka
