= Bulgaria at the 1976 Summer Olympics =

- IOC code: BUL
- NOC: Bulgarian Olympic Committee

in Montreal
- Competitors: 158 (105 men and 53 women) in 14 sports
- Flag bearer: Aleksandar Tomov
- Medals Ranked 7th: Gold 6 Silver 9 Bronze 7 Total 22

Summer Olympics appearances (overview)
- 1896; 1900–1920; 1924; 1928; 1932; 1936; 1948; 1952; 1956; 1960; 1964; 1968; 1972; 1976; 1980; 1984; 1988; 1992; 1996; 2000; 2004; 2008; 2012; 2016; 2020; 2024

Bulgaria competed at the 1976 Summer Olympics in Montreal, Quebec, Canada. 158 competitors, 105 men and 53 women, took part in 108 events in 14 sports.

== Medalists ==
Medal	Name	Sport	Event	Date
Gold	Norair Nurikyan	Weightlifting	Men's bantamweight	19 July
Gold	Yordan Mitkov	Weightlifting	Men's middleweight	22 July
Gold	Svetla Otsetova, Zdravka Yordanova	Rowing	Women's double sculls	24 July
Gold	Siyka Kelbecheva, Stoyanka Gruycheva	Rowing	Women's coxless pair	24 July
Gold	Ivanka Khristova	Athletics	Women's shot put	31 July
Gold	Hasan Isaev	Wrestling	Men's freestyle light flyweight	31 July
Silver	Georgi Todorov	Weightlifting	Men's featherweight	20 July
Silver	Kapka Georgieva-Panayotova, Ginka Gyurova, Mariyka Modeva and Reni Yordanova	Rowing	Women's coxed fours	24 July
Silver	Trendafil Stoychev	Weightlifting	Men's light heavyweight	24 July
Silver	Aleksandar Tomov	Wrestling	Men's Greco-Roman super heavyweight	24 July
Silver	Kamen Goranov	Wrestling	Men's Greco-Roman heavyweight	24 July
Silver	Stoyan Nikolov	Wrestling	Men's Greco-Roman light heavyweight	24 July
Silver	Nikolina Shtereva	Athletics	Women's 800 metres	26 July
Silver	Krastyu Semerdzhiev	Weightlifting	Men's heavyweight	26 July
Silver	Mariya Vergova	Athletics	Women's discus throw	29 July
Bronze	Stefan Angelov	Wrestling	Men's Greco-Roman light flyweight	24 July
Bronze	Ivan Kolev	Wrestling	Men's Greco-Roman middleweight	24 July
Bronze	Atanas Shopov	Weightlifting	Men's middle heavyweight	25 July
Bronze	Krasimira Bogdanova, Diana Dilova-Braynova, Nadka Golcheva, Krasimira Gyurova, Petkana Makaveeva, Penka Metodieva, Snezhana Mikhaylova, Margarita Shtarkelova, Girgina Skerlatova, Mariya Stoyanova, Penka Stoyanova, and Todorka Yordanova	Basketball	Basketball, Women's Team Competition	26 July
Bronze	Yordanka Blagoeva	Athletics	Women's high jump	28 July
Bronze	Vladimir Kolev	Boxing	Men's light welterweight	29 July
Bronze	Dimo Kostov	Wrestling	Men's freestyle heavyweight	31 July

== Athletics ==
Men's 100 metres

- Petar Petrov

Men's 400m Hurdles

- Yanko Bratanov
  - Heats — 51.84s
  - Semi Final — 50.11s
  - Final — 50.03s (→ 6th place)

Men's Discus Throw

- Velko Velev
  - Qualification — 63.54m
  - Final — 60.94m (→ 10th place)

Men's Javelin Throw

- Valentin Dzhonev

Women's 200 metres

- Liliyana Panayotova-Ivanova

Women's 800 metres

- Nikolina Shtereva
- Svetla Zlateva
- Liliyana Todorova

Women's 1,500 metres

- Nikolina Shtereva
- Vesela Yatsinska
- Rositsa Pekhlivanova

Women's 100 metres Hurdles

- Penka Sokolova

Women's 4×400 metres Relay

- Yordanka Ivanova, Svetla Zlateva, Ivanka Bonova, and Liliyana Todorova

Women's High Jump

- Yordanka Blagoeva

Women's Long Jump

- Liliyana Panayotova-Ivanova
- Ekaterina Nedeva

Women's Shot Put

- Ivanka Khristova
  - Final — 21.16 m (→ Gold Medal)
- Elena Stoyanova
  - Final — 18.89 m (→ 8th place)

Women's Discus Throw

- Mariya Vergova

Women's Javelin Throw

- Yordanka Peeva

Women's Pentathlon

- Penka Sokolova

== Basketball ==
=== Women's tournament ===
Team	W	L	PF	PA	PD	Pts	1st Tie
Soviet Union	5	0	504	346	+158	10	
United States	3	2	415	417	−2	8	1W–0L
Bulgaria	3	2	365	377	−12	8	0W–1L
Czechoslovakia	2	3	351	359	−8	7	1W–0L
Japan	2	3	405	400	+5	7	0W–1L
Canada	0	5	336	477	−141	5	

July 19

Czechoslovakia	66–67	Bulgaria

Centre Étienne Desmarteau, Montreal

July 20

United States	95–79	Bulgaria

Centre Étienne Desmarteau, Montreal

July 22

Bulgaria	68–91	Soviet Union

Centre Étienne Desmarteau, Montreal

July 23

Bulgaria	66–63	Japan

Centre Étienne Desmarteau, Montreal

July 25

Canada	62–85	Bulgaria

Montreal Forum, Montreal

==== Team roster ====
  - Nadka Golcheva
  - Penka Metodieva
  - Petkana Makaveyeva
  - Snezhana Mihailova
  - Krassima Gyurova
  - Krassimira Bogdanova
  - Todorka Yordanova
  - Diana Dilova
  - Margarita Shturkelova
  - Mania Stoyanova
  - Girgina Skerlatova
  - Penka Stoyanova
  - Head coach: Ivan Galabov

== Boxing ==
Men

Athlete	Event	1 Round	2 Round	3 Round	Quarterfinals	Semifinals	Final	
Athlete	Event	Opposition Result	Opposition Result	Opposition Result	Opposition Result	Opposition Result	Opposition Result	Rank
Beyhan Fuchedzhiev	Light Flyweight	Jorge Hernández (CUB); L RSC-3	Did not advance					
Georgi Kostadinov	Flyweight	BYE	Jung Chul-Kim (KOR); W 5-0	Alfredo Pérez (VEN); L 0-5	Did not advance			
Chacho Andreykovski	Bantamweight	BYE	Aldo Cosentino (FRA); W KO-3	Gu Yong-Ju (PRK); L 0-5	Did not advance			
Rumen Peshev	Featherweight	BYE	Gustavo de la Cruz (DOM); L 0-5	Did not advance				
Tsvetan Tsvetkov	Lightweight	BYE	Khaidav Altanhuiag (MGL); W 5-0	Parviz Bahmani (IRN); W 5-0	Howard Davis (USA); L RSC-3	Did not advance		
Vladimir Kolev	Light Welterweight	BYE	Tai Shik-Park (KOR); W 5-0	Ernst Müller (FRG); W 5-0	Calistrat Cuțov (ROM); W 5-0	Andrés Aldama (CUB); L KO-1	Did not advance	Bronze medal
Plamen Yankov	Welterweight	BYE	Emilio Correa (CUB); L RSC-2	Did not advance				
Nayden Stanchev	Light Middleweight	Steven Moi (KEN); W WO	Vasile Didea (ROM); L 0-5	Did not advance				
Ryszard Pasiewicz	Middleweight	Musa Gariba (GHA); W WO	Rufat Riskiyev (URS); L 0-5	Did not advance				
Georgi Stoymenov	Light Heavyweight	Ernesto Sanchez (VEN); W 5-0	Janusz Gortat (POL); L AB-3	Did not advance				
Atanas Suvandzhiev	Heavyweight	Mahmoud Ahmed Ali (EGY); W WO	Viktor Ivanov (URS); W 4-1	—N/a	Mircea Şimon (ROM); L 1-4	Did not advance		

== Canoeing ==
=== Sprint ===
Men

Athlete	Event	Heats		Repechages		Semifinals		Final	
Athlete	Event	Time	Rank	Time	Rank	Time	Rank	Time	Rank
Borislav Ananiev	C-1 500 m	2:12.16	3 Q	BYE		2:11.23	3 Q	1:59.92	4
Borislav Ananiev	C-1 1000 m	4:28.18	3 Q	BYE		4:13.39	1 Q	4:14.41	4
Ivan Burchin; Krasimir Khristov	C-2 500 m	1:58.84	2 Q	BYE		1:51.63	2 Q	1:50.43	6
Ivan Burchin; Krasimir Khristov	C-2 1000 m	3:57.13	4 Q	3:52.00	2 Q	3:58.74	3 Q	4:02.44	7
Ivan Manev	K-1 500 m	1:57.30	3 Q	BYE		1:57.30	4	Did not advance	
Lazar Khristov; Borislav Borisov	K-2 500 m	1:46.02	3 Q	BYE		1:42.21	4	Did not advance	
Lazar Khristov; Borislav Borisov	K-2 1000 m	3:35.94	3 Q	BYE		3:26.76	1 Q	3:37.30	9
Ivan Manev; Bozhidar Milenkov; Nikolai Nachev; Vasil Chilingirov	K-4 1000 m	3:11.39	3 Q	BYE		3:14.35	3 Q	3:12.94	7

Women

Athlete	Event	Heats		Repechages		Semifinals		Final	
Athlete	Event	Time	Rank	Time	Rank	Time	Rank	Time	Rank
Rosa Georgieva	K-1 500 m	2:14.23	4 Q	2:10.57	2 Q	2:10.51	3 Q	2:08.54	9
Mariya Mincheva; Natasha Petrova	K-2 500 m	2:00.52	7 Q	1:56.60	2 Q	1:53.29	2 Q	1:55.95	7

== Cycling ==
Six cyclists represented Bulgaria in 1976.

=== Road ===
Athlete	Event	Time	Rank
Stoyan Bobekov	Men's road race	4:58:35	49
Martin Martinov	Men's road race	DNF	
Ivan Popov	Men's road race	DNF	
Nedyalko Stoyanov	Men's road race	DNF	
Georgi Fortunov; Ivan Popov; Nedyalko Stoyanov; Stoyan Bobekov	Team time trial	2:15:07	12

=== Track ===
1000m time trial

Athlete	Event	Time	Rank
Dimo Angelov Tonchev	Men's 1000m time trial	1:08.950	14

Men's Sprint

Athlete	Event	Round 1	Repechage 1	Round 2	Repechage 2	Repechage Finals	Quarterfinals	Semifinals	Final	
Athlete	Event	Time Speed (km/h)	Rank	Opposition Time Speed (km/h)	Opposition Time Speed (km/h)	Opposition Time Speed (km/h)	Opposition Time Speed (km/h)	Opposition Time Speed (km/h)	Opposition Time Speed (km/h)	Rank
Dimo Angelov Tonchev	Men's sprint	Singleton (CAN); L	Kountras (GRE); W 11.50	Tormen Mendez (CHI); Rossi (ITA); L	Vaarten (BEL); Echeverry (COL); L	Did not advance				

== Fencing ==
Five fencers, all men, represented Bulgaria in 1976.

Men's sabre

- Miroslav Dudekov
- Anani Mikhaylov
- Trayan Dimitrov

Men's team sabre

- Miroslav Dudekov, Anani Mikhaylov, Konstantin Dzhelepov, Khristo Khristov

== Judo ==
Men

Athlete	Event	Round 1	Round 2	Round 3	Round 4	Repechage 1	Repechage 2	Final / BM	
Athlete	Event	Opposition Result	Opposition Result	Opposition Result	Opposition Result	Opposition Result	Opposition Result	Opposition Result	Rank
Parvan Parvanov	−63kg	David Saad (LIB); W 0010-0000	Bakhvain Buyadaa (MGL); L 0000-0001	Did not advance					12
Georgi Georgiev	−70kg	BYE	Vacinuff Morrison (GBR); L 0000-0001	Did not advance					13
Tsancho Atanasov	−93kg	BYE	Ung Nam An (PRK); L 0000-0010	Did not advance					18
Emil Petrunov	+93kg	BYE	Keith Remfry (GBR); L 0000–0010	Did not advance					12

== Modern pentathlon ==
Three male pentathletes represented Bulgaria in 1976.

Individual

- Stoyan Zlatev
- Velko Bratanov
- Nikolay Nikolov

Team

- Stoyan Zlatev
- Velko Bratanov
- Nikolay Nikolov

== Rowing ==
Men

Athlete	Event	Heats		Repechage		Semifinals		Final	
Athlete	Event	Time	Rank	Time	Rank	Time	Rank	Time	Rank
Georgi Georgiev; Valentin Stoev	Coxless pair	6:58.96	2 Q	BYE		6:33.23	3 Q	7:37.42	5
Tsvetan Petkov; Rumen Khristov; Todor Kishev	Coxed pair	7:24.44	1 Q	BYE		7:01.10	1 Q	8:11.27	4
Mincho Nikolov; Eftim Gerzilov; Yordan Valchev; Khristo Zelev	Quadruple sculls	5:57.19	3 R	5:49.38	2 Q	—N/a		6:32.04	5
Rumian Khristov; Todor Mrankov; Dimitar Valov; Dimitar Yanakiev	Coxless four	6:20.71	3 Q	BYE		6:06.58	5 FB	6:41.36	7
Lachesar Boichev; Ivan Botev; Nacho Minchev; Kiril Kirchev; Nenko Dobrev	Coxed Four	6:43.69	4 R	6:23.47	2 Q	6:13.26	2 Q	6:52.88	5

Women

Athlete	Event	Heats		Repechage		Semifinals		Final	
Athlete	Event	Time	Rank	Time	Rank	Time	Rank	Time	Rank
Rosica Spasova	Single sculls	3:42.67	1 Q	BYE		—N/a		4:10.86	4
Svetla Otsetova; Zdravka Yordanova	Double sculls	3:25.05	1 Q	BYE		—N/a		3:44.36	Gold medal
Siyka Kelbecheva; Stoyanka Kurbatova-Gruicheva	Coxless pair	3:33.24	2 R	3:48.73	1 Q	—N/a		4:01.22	Gold medal
Verka Aleksieva; Svetlana Gincheva; Iskra Velinova; Troianka Vasileva; Stanka Georgieva	Quadruple sculls	3:12.13	2 R	3:22.43	1 Q	—N/a		3:34.13	4
Ginka Gyurova; Lilyana Vaseva; Reni Yordanova; Mariyka Modeva; Kapka Georgieva	Coxed four	3:20.98	1 Q	BYE		—N/a		3:48.24	Silver medal

== Shooting ==
Open

Athlete	Event	Final	
Athlete	Event	Score	Rank
Dencho Denev	50 m pistol	575	8
Lyubcho Dyakov	50 m pistol	550	18
Stefan Krastev	50 m rifle prone	591	12
Anton Manolov	Skeet	188	35
Nonka Matova	50 m rifle three positions	1148	11
Anka Pelova	50 m rifle prone	582	60
Emiliyan Vergov	50 m rifle three positions	1139	20

== Swimming ==
Men

Athlete	Event	Heat		Semifinal		Final	
Athlete	Event	Time	Rank	Time	Rank	Time	Rank
Nikolay Ganev	200 metre freestyle	2:00.54	43	Did not advance			
Petar Georgiev	200 metre freestyle	2:00.70	44	Did not advance			
Stefan Georgiev	100 metre freestyle	53.85	23	Did not advance			
Krasimir Stoykov	100 metre backstroke	1:00.24	17	Did not advance			
Krasimir Stoykov	200 metre backstroke	2:09.67	19	Did not advance			
Petar Georgiev; Stefan Georgiev; Toni Statelov; Krasimir Stoykov	4 × 200 m freestyle relay	7:57.08	13	Did not advance			

== Weightlifting ==
Men

Athlete	Event	Snatch		Clean & Jerk		Total	Rank
Athlete	Event	Result	Rank	Result	Rank	Total	Rank
Norair Nurikyan	−56 kg	117.5	1	145	1	262.5	Gold medal
Georghi Todorov	−60 kg	122.5	3	157.5	2	280	Silver medal
Todor Todorov	−60 kg	0	NVL	0	DNS	0	AC
Yordan Mitkov	−75 kg	145	1	190	1	335	Gold medal
Blagoy Blagoev	−82,5 kg	162.5	AC	200	AC	362.5	DSQ
Trendafil Stoitchev	−82,5 kg	162.5	2	197.5	2	360	Silver medal
Atanas Shopov	−90 kg	155	6	205	2	360	Bronze medal
Valentin Khristov	−110 kg	170	AC	225	AC	395	DSQ
Krastiu Semerdzhiev	−110 kg	170	1	215	3	385	Silver medal
