= Kolev =

- Pronunciation: Kolev

Origin
- Origin: Bulgarian
- Region of origin: Central Bulgaria

Other names
- Variant forms: Koleva(f), Nikolaj, Kolio, Nikola

Kolev (Bulgarian: Колев) is a common Bulgarian surname derived from the name of Nikolaj, Kolja. It is the surname of sons and daughters (for women: Koleva) of a father who is named Nikolaj. Notable people with the name Kolev include:

- Aleksandar Kolev (born 1992), Bulgarian football forward
- Angel Kolev (born 1953), Bulgarian football manager
- Atanas Kolev (born 1967), Bulgarian chess player
- Atanas Kolev (rapper) (born 1996), Bulgarian rapper and basketball player
- Binko Kolev (born 1958), Bulgarian Olympic runner
- Bozhil Kolev (born 1949), Bulgarian football player and manager
- Deyan Kolev (1965–2013), Bulgarian Olympic gymnast
- Diana Koleva (born 1959), Bulgarian Olympic badminton player
- Dilyan Kolev (born 1988), Bulgarian football player
- Dimitar Kolev, later Dumitru Coliu
- Elena Koleva (born 1977), Bulgarian volleyball player
- Elizabeth Koleva (born 1972), Bulgarian rhythmic gymnast
- Hristo Kolev (born 1964), Bulgarian football midfielder
- Ivan Kolev (disambiguation)
- Ivanka Koleva (born 1968), Bulgarian field athlete
- Krasimir Kolev (born 1971), Bulgarian football goalkeeper
- Maria Koleva (born 1940), Bulgarian writer
- Maria Koleva (gymnast) (born 1977), Bulgarian rhythmic gymnast
- Nikolay Kolev (disambiguation)
- Nedelcho Kolev (born 1953), Bulgarian weightlifter
- Pavel Kolev (born 1975), Bulgarian football defender
- Petar Kolev (disambiguation)
- Petrana Koleva (born 1947), Bulgarian sprint canoer
- Plamen Kolev (born 1988), Bulgarian football goalkeeper
- Rosen Kolev (born 1990), Bulgarian football defender
- Slavina Koleva (born 1986), Bulgarian volleyball player
- Stancho Kolev (1937–2025), Bulgarian freestyle wrestler
- Stefan Kolev (born 1966), Bulgarian football manager and former football defender
- Stefka Koleva (born 1954), Bulgarian Olympic rower
- Svetla Zlateva-Koleva (born 1952), Bulgarian runner
- Stoyan Kolev (born 1976), Bulgarian football goalkeeper
- Stoyko Kolev (born 1986), Bulgarian football player
- Tanya Stefanova-Koleva (born 1972), Bulgarian pole vaulter
- Todor Kolev (disambiguation)
- Victoria Koleva (born 1960), Bulgarian actress
- Vladimir Kolev (born 1953), Bulgarian boxer
- Yoan Kolev (born 1991), Bulgarian windsurfer
- Zornitza Koleva (born 1979), Spanish handball player
