= Stoyanov =

Stoyanov (Bulgarian: Стоянов), feminine Stoyanova (Bulgarian: Стоянова) is a Bulgarian surname. Sometimes, when abroad, the spelling is changed, for instance, to Stoianov or Estoyanoff.

Notable people with the surname include:

== Stoyanov ==
- Aleksandar Stoyanov (born 1986), Bulgarian footballer
- Angel Stoyanov (ski jumper) (born 1958), Bulgarian ski jumper
- Angel Stoyanov (boxer) (born 1967), Bulgarian boxer
- Blagovest Stoyanov (born 1968), Bulgarian sprint canoer
- Borislav Stoyanov (born 1985), Bulgarian footballer
- Dimitar Stoyanov (disambiguation), multiple people
- Emil Stoyanov (born 1959), Bulgarian politician
- Fabián Estoyanoff (born 1982), Uruguayan footballer
- Georgi Stoyanov (pentathlete) (born 1947), Bulgarian modern pentathlete
- Hristo Stoyanov (born 1953), Bulgarian volleyball player
- Ilian Stoyanov (born 1977), Bulgarian footballer
- Ivan Stoyanov (disambiguation), multiple people
- Ivaylo Stoyanov (born 1990), Bulgarian footballer
- Kaloyan Stoyanov (born 1986), Bulgarian footballer
- Kiro Stojanov (born 1959), Macedonian Greek-Catholic hierarch, Apostolic Exarch of Macedonia (since 2005)
- Kostadin Stoyanov (born 1986), Bulgarian footballer
- Krum Stoyanov (born 1992), Bulgarian footballer
- Michael Stoyanov (born 1970), American actor and television writer
- Nikola Stoyanov (1874–1967), Bulgarian scientist, economist and financier
- Nikolai Stojanov (1883–1968), Bulgarian botanist
- Paraskev Stoyanov (1871–1941), Bulgarian surgeon
- Petar Stoyanov (born 1952), President of Bulgaria from 1997 until 2002
- Petar Stoyanov (footballer) (born 1985), Bulgarian footballer
- Petru Stoianov (born 1931), Romanian composer
- Rachel Stoyanov (born 2003), Bulgarian rhythmic gymnast
- Stanislav Stoyanov (footballer) (born 1976), Bulgarian footballer
- Stoyan Stoyanov (1913–1994), Bulgarian fighter ace of the Royal Bulgarian Air Force
- Svetoslav Stoyanov (born 1976), Bulgarian/French badminton player
- Todor Stoyanov (1930–1999), Bulgarian film director and cinematographer
- Velcho Stoyanov (1907–1982), Bulgarian footballer
- Veselin Stoyanov (1902–1969), Bulgarian composer
- Vladimir Stoyanov (born 1969), Bulgarian operatic baritone
- Vladislav Stoyanov (born 1987), Bulgarian footballer
- Yoni Stoyanov (born 2001), Bulgarian footballer
- Yuri Stoyanov (born 1957), Soviet and Russian theater and film actor, musician of Bulgarian descent
- Zahari Stoyanov (1850–1889), Bulgarian revolutionary and historian

== Stoyanova ==
- Boriana Stoyanova (born 1969), Bulgarian artistic gymnast
- Elena Stoyanova (born 1952), Bulgarian shot putter
- Krassimira Stoyanova (born 1962), Bulgarian soprano
- Mariya Stoyanova (born 1947), Bulgarian basketball player
- Penka Stoyanova (1950–2019), Bulgarian basketball player
- Radka Stoyanova (born 1964), Bulgarian rower

== See also ==
- Stoyanova, Kursk Oblast, a rural locality in Kursk Oblast, Russia
- Stojanov
