= Stojanović =

Stojanović (Serbian Cyrillic: Cтojaнoвић, pronounced [stojǎːnoʋitɕ]) is a South Slavic surname derived from the South Slavic masculine given name Stojan. Stojanović is the sixth most frequent surname in Serbia, and is also common in Croatia, with 2,798 carriers (2011 census).

== Geographical distribution ==
As of 2014, 78.9% of all known bearers of the surname Stojanović were residents of Serbia (frequency 1:139), 10.4% of Bosnia and Herzegovina (1:524), 3.3% of Kosovo (1:864), 3.0% of Montenegro (1:322), 3.0% of Croatia (1:2,197) and 1.4% of the Republic of Macedonia (1:2,362).

In Serbia, the frequency of the surname was higher than national average (1:139) in the following districts:

1. Jablanica District (1:30)
2. Pčinja District (1:48)
3. Nišava District (1:52)
4. Toplica District (1:59)
5. Pirot District (1:71)
6. Zaječar District (1:72)
7. Pomoravlje District (1:78)
8. Braničevo District (1:95)
9. Podunavlje District (1:98)
10. Bor District (1:99)

== People ==
- Anđelija Stojanović (born 1987), Serbian chess grandmaster
- Aleksandar Stojanović (born 1954), Serbian football goalkeeping manager and former goalkeeper
- Boban Stojanović (footballer) (born 1979), Serbian football striker
- Boban Stojanović (activist) (born 1978), Serbian LGBT activist
- Dalibor Stojanović (born 1989), Slovenian football midfielder/striker
- Danijel Stojanović (born 1984), Croatian football player
- Dejan Stojanović (born 1959), Serbian-American poet, writer, essayist, philosopher, businessman, and former journalist
- Dejan Stojanović (footballer) (born 1993), Austrian footballer
- Dejan Stojanović (musician), drummer for the rock band Smak
- Filip Stojanović (footballer) (born 1988), Serbian football player
- Filip Stojanović (politician) (1944-2026), Serbian politician
- Goran Stojanović (born 1977), Montenegrin handball player
- Ivan Stojanović (1829–1900), Dubrovnik priest
- Ljubiša Stojanović (1952–2011), Serbian singer best known as Louis
- Ljubomir Stojanović (1860–1930), Serbian statesman, politician, philologist and academic
- Mijat Stojanović (1818–1881), Croatian educator, ethnographer and folk writer
- Mike Stojanović (1947–2010), NASL and Canadian international soccer forward
- Milan Stojanović (goalkeeper) (active in 1930), Yugoslavian football goalkeeper
- Milan Stojanović (midfielder) (born 1988), Serbian football midfielder
- Milka Stojanović (1937–2023), Serbian soprano opera singer
- Miloš Stojanović (footballer, born 1984), Serbian association football player who plays for Gyeongnam FC
- Miloš Stojanović (footballer, born 1997), Serbian association football player who plays for Red Star Belgrade
- Mirko Stojanović (born 1939), Croatian footballer
- Mladen Stojanović (1896–1942), doctor and Yugoslav national hero from Prijedor
- Mladen Stojanović "Čakr-paša" (fl. 1876–85), Serbian brigand and rebel
- Nenad Stojanović (born 1979), Serbian football player
- Nikola Stojanović (politician, born 1880), a Serbian writer and politician (died 1964)
- Nikola Stojanović (politician, born 1933), a Serbian communist who served as the Secretary of the Presidency of the League of Communists of Yugoslavia (died 2020)
- Nikola Stojanović (film director) (1942–2021), a Serbian director
- Nikola Stojanović (footballer, born 1983), Macedonian football defender
- Nikola Stojanović (footballer, born 1995), Serbian football midfielder and forward
- Nina Stojanović (born 1996), Serbian tennis player
- Petar Stojanović (composer) (1877–1957), Hungarian-born Serbian violinist and composer
- Petar Stojanović (footballer) (born 1995), Slovenian football player
- Radoslav Stojanović, a professor of law at University of Belgrade
- Saša Stojanović (born 1983), footballer from Serbia
- Slaviša Stojanović (footballer, born 1969), Slovenian football coach
- Slaviša Stojanović (footballer, born 1989), Serbian footballer
- Slavko Stojanović (1930–2012), Croatian football goalkeeper
- Sreten Stojanović (1898–1960), Bosnian and Serbian sculptor
- Stefan Stojanovic (soccer, born 2001), American soccer player
- Stefan Stojanović (footballer, born 1988), Serbian footballer
- Stefan Stojanović (footballer, born 1992), Serbian footballer
- Stefan Stojanović (footballer, born 1997), Serbian footballer
- Stevan Stojanović (born 1964), Serbian football (soccer) goalkeeper
- Stevan Stojanović Mokranjac (1856–1914), Serbian composer and music educator
- Sven Stojanovic (born 1969), Swedish director of Serbian origin
- Svetozar Stojanović (1931–2010), Serbian philosopher and political theorist
- Traian Stoianovich (1920–2005), Serbian-American historian
- Vesna Stojanović, Serbian football striker

== See also ==
- Stojanovski, variant used in R. Macedonia
- Stojković
- Stojačić
- Stojmenović
- Stojić
