= Stojković =

Stojković (Serbian Cyrillic: Стојковић, pronounced [stǒːjkoʋitɕ]) is a Serbian surname, derived from the male given name Stojko, a diminutive of Stojan. The Croatian census of 2011 listed it as one of the most common surnames in Duga Resa.

Notable people with the surname include:

- Benedikt Stojković (1714–1801), Roman Catholic clergyman
- Danilo "Bata" Stojković, stage and film actor
- Dennis Stojković, Serbian footballer
- Dragan "Piksi" Stojković, retired footballer, former manager of J. League side Nagoya Grampus
- Filip Stojković, Montenegrin football player
- Luka Stojković (born 2003), Croatian footballer
- Milenko Stojković, leading figures in the First Serbian Uprising
- Miodrag Stojković, genetics researcher
- Nenad Stojković, Serbian defender who played at FIFA World Cup 1982 for SFR Yugoslavia
- Rastko Stojković, Serbian handball player
- Vladimir Stojković, Serbian international football goalkeeper
- Zoran Stojković, court judge and politician, current Serbian Minister of Justice

== See also ==
- Stojanović, a surname
- Stojačić, a surname
- Stojaković, a surname
- Stojmenović, a surname
