= Basketball at the 1976 Summer Olympics =

9th Olympic Basketball Tournament
- Montreal 1976

Tournament details
- Olympics: 1976 Summer Olympics
- Host nation: Canada
- City: Montreal
- Duration: July 18–27, 1976

Men's tournament
- Teams: 12
Medals
Gold medalists	United States
Silver medalists	Yugoslavia
Bronze medalists	Soviet Union

Women's tournament
- Teams: 6
Medals
Gold medalists	Soviet Union
Silver medalists	United States
Bronze medalists	Bulgaria

Tournaments
← Munich 1972	Moscow 1980 →

Basketball events at the 1976 Summer Olympics was the ninth appearance of the sport of basketball as an official Olympic medal event. It took place from July 18 to July 27 at the Centre Étienne Desmarteau and the Montreal Forum in Montreal, Quebec, Canada. Women's basketball was introduced to the Olympic program for the first time at this Games. The United States won the gold against Yugoslavia in the men's tournament, while the Soviet Union won the gold medal against the United States in the women's competition.

== Medal summary ==
Event	Gold	Silver	Bronze
Men's	United States; Phil Ford; Steve Sheppard; Adrian Dantley; Walter Davis; Quinn Buckner; Ernie Grunfeld; Kenneth Carr; Scott May; Tate Armstrong; Tom LaGarde; Philip Hubbard; Mitch Kupchak	Yugoslavia; Blagoja Georgievski; Dragan Kićanović; Vinko Jelovac; Rajko Žižić; Željko Jerkov; Andro Knego; Zoran Slavnić; Krešimir Ćosić; Damir Šolman; Žarko Varajić; Dražen Dalipagić; Mirza Delibašić	Soviet Union; Vladimir Arzamaskov; Aleksandr Salnikov; Valery Miloserdov; Alzhan Zharmukhamedov; Andrey Makeyev; Ivan Edeshko; Sergei Belov; Vladimir Tkachenko; Anatoly Myshkin; Mikheil Korkia; Aleksandr Belov; Vladimir Zhigily
Women's	Soviet Union; Olga Barysheva; Tamāra Dauniene; Natalya Klimova; Tatyana Ovechkina; Angelė Rupšienė; Nadezhda Shuvayeva; Nadezhda Zakharova; Uljana Semjonova; Raisa Kurvyakova; Nelli Feryabnikova; Olga Sukharnova; Tetiana Zakharova	United States; Cindy Brogdon; Susan Rojcewicz; Ann Meyers; Lusia Harris; Nancy Dunkle; Charlotte Lewis; Nancy Lieberman; Gail Marquis; Patricia Roberts; Mary Anne O'Connor; Patricia Head; Juliene Simpson	Bulgaria; Krasimira Bogdanova; Diana Dilova; Krasimira Gyurova; Penka Metodieva; Snezhana Mikhaylova; Girgina Skerlatova; Mariya Stoyanova; Margarita Shtarkelova; Petkana Makaveeva; Nadka Golcheva; Penka Stoyanova; Todorka Yordanova

== Qualification ==
A single NOC may enter up to one men's team with 12 players and up to one women's team with 12 players. Automatic qualifications were granted to the host country for both events plus the three medal winners from the previous Olympic Games for the men's tournament, and the three first places at the 1975 FIBA World Championship for the women's tournament. Additional spots for the men's tournament were decided via the continental qualification tournaments held by FIBA and an extra qualifying tournament held in Hamilton, Canada months prior to the contest. The remaining slots for the women's competition were also assigned via another tournament held in the same city.

=== Men ===
Means of qualification	Date	Venue	Berths	Qualified
Host nation			1	Canada
1972 Olympic Tournament	27 August–9 September 1972	(West Germany) Munchin	3	Soviet Union
1972 Olympic Tournament	27 August–9 September 1972	(West Germany) Munchin	3	United States
1972 Olympic Tournament	27 August–9 September 1972	(West Germany) Munchin	3	Cuba
FIBA Africa Championship 1975	20 – 28 December 1975	(Egypt) Alexandria	1	Egypt^{[a]}
1975 Pan American Games	13 – 25 October 1975	Mexico City	1	Puerto Rico^{[b]}
1975 FIBA Oceania Championship	6–9 November 1975	Australia	1	Australia
1975 ABC Championship	15 – 26 November 1975	(Thailand) Bangkok	1	~~China~~
1975 ABC Championship	15 – 26 November 1975	(Thailand) Bangkok	1	Japan^{[c]}
1976 European Pre-Olympic Tournament		(Scotland) Edinburgh	1	Italy
World Qualification Tournament	22 June–3 July 1976	(Canada) Hamilton	3	Yugoslavia
World Qualification Tournament	22 June–3 July 1976	(Canada) Hamilton	3	Czechoslovakia
World Qualification Tournament	22 June–3 July 1976	(Canada) Hamilton	3	Mexico
Total			12	

=== Women ===
Means of qualification	Date	Venue	Berths	Qualified
Host nation			1	Canada
1975 FIBA World Championship for Women	23 September – 14 October 1975	Colombia	3	Soviet Union
1975 FIBA World Championship for Women	23 September – 14 October 1975	Colombia	3	Japan
1975 FIBA World Championship for Women	23 September – 14 October 1975	Colombia	3	Czechoslovakia
World Qualification Tournament	24 June – 2 July 1976	(Canada) Hamilton	2	United States
World Qualification Tournament	24 June – 2 July 1976	(Canada) Hamilton	2	Bulgaria
Total			6	

- ^{a} Egypt withdrew from the Olympic Games after one match, following the boycott of several African countries against New Zealand. All matches involving Egypt were then forfeited.
- ^{b} Puerto Rico qualified after winning the silver medal at the 1975 Pan American Games, since the gold medal went to the United States, who had already qualified.
- ^{c} Replaced China.

== Format ==
Men's tournament:

- Two groups of six teams are formed, where the top two from each group advance to the semifinals.
- Third and fourth places from each group form an additional bracket to decide 5th–8th places in the final ranking.
- Fifth and sixth places from each group form an additional bracket to decide 9th–12th places in the final ranking.

Women's tournament:

- One round-robin group is formed containing all six teams, where the final standings are decided.

Tie-breaking criteria:

1. Head to head results
2. Goal average (not the goal difference) between the tied teams
3. Goal average of the tied teams for all teams in its group

== Men's tournament ==
=== Preliminary round ===
The first two places in each of the preliminary round groups advanced to the semifinals, where Group A teams would meet Group B teams. The Soviet Union and the United States, two of the powerhouses at this tournament, finished the preliminary round undefeated. The host nation, Canada, also qualified for the semifinals together with Yugoslavia.

Egypt played only one match, against Czechoslovakia, and then flew home supporting the boycott of several African countries. Their remaining matches were forfeited.

==== Group A ====
Pos	Team	Pld	W	L	PF	PA	PD	Pts	Qualification
1	Soviet Union	5	5	0	548	374	+174	10	Semifinals
2	Canada (H)	5	4	1	446	416	+30	9	Semifinals
3	Cuba	5	3	2	448	402	+46	8	5th–8th classification round
4	Australia	5	2	3	472	481	−9	7	5th–8th classification round
5	Mexico	5	1	4	461	511	−50	6	9th–12th classification round
6	Japan	5	0	5	364	555	−191	5	9th–12th classification round

Source: FIBA archive
Rules for classification: 1) points; 2) head-to-head points; 3) head-to-head goal average; 4) head-to-head number of points scored.
(H) Hosts

July 18

Canada	104–76	Japan

Centre Étienne Desmarteau, Montreal

July 18

Cuba	111–89	Australia

Centre Étienne Desmarteau, Montreal

July 18

Mexico	77–120	Soviet Union

Centre Étienne Desmarteau, Montreal

July 19

Canada	84–79	Cuba

Centre Étienne Desmarteau, Montreal

July 19

Soviet Union	93–77	Australia

Centre Étienne Desmarteau, Montreal

July 19

Mexico	108–90	Japan

Centre Étienne Desmarteau, Montreal

July 21

Mexico	117–120 (OT)	Australia

Centre Étienne Desmarteau, Montreal

July 21

Japan	56–97	Cuba

Centre Étienne Desmarteau, Montreal

July 21

Soviet Union	108–85	Canada

Centre Étienne Desmarteau, Montreal

July 23

Japan	63–129	Soviet Union

Centre Étienne Desmarteau, Montreal

July 23

Mexico	75–89	Cuba

Centre Étienne Desmarteau, Montreal

July 23

Australia	69–81	Canada

Centre Étienne Desmarteau, Montreal

July 24

Cuba	72–98	Soviet Union

Centre Étienne Desmarteau, Montreal

July 24

Mexico	84–92	Canada

Centre Étienne Desmarteau, Montreal

July 24

Australia	117–79	Japan

Centre Étienne Desmarteau, Montreal

==== Group B ====
Pos	Team	Pld	W	L	PF	PA	PD	Pts	Qualification
1	United States	5	5	0	396	349	+47	10	Semifinals
2	Yugoslavia	5	4	1	366	343	+23	9	Semifinals
3	Italy	5	3	2	349	344	+5	8	5th–8th classification round
4	Czechoslovakia	5	2	3	418	406	+12	7	5th–8th classification round
5	Puerto Rico	5	1	4	323	363	−40	6	9th–12th classification round
6	Egypt	5	0	5	64	111	−47	5	9th–12th classification round

Source: FIBA archive
Rules for classification: 1) points; 2) head-to-head points; 3) head-to-head goal average; 4) head-to-head number of points scored.

July 18

Yugoslavia	84–63	Puerto Rico

Centre Étienne Desmarteau, Montreal

July 18

Italy	86–106	United States

Centre Étienne Desmarteau, Montreal

July 18

Egypt	64–103	Czechoslovakia

Centre Étienne Desmarteau, Montreal

July 20

Forfeited

Italy	2–0	Egypt

Centre Étienne Desmarteau, Montreal

July 20

United States	95–94	Puerto Rico

Centre Étienne Desmarteau, Montreal

July 20

Yugoslavia	99–81	Czechoslovakia

Centre Étienne Desmarteau, Montreal

July 21

Forfeited

Puerto Rico	2–0	Egypt

Centre Étienne Desmarteau, Montreal

July 21

Czechoslovakia	69–79	Italy

Centre Étienne Desmarteau, Montreal

July 21

Yugoslavia	93–112	United States

Centre Étienne Desmarteau, Montreal

July 22

Czechoslovakia	89–83	Puerto Rico

Centre Étienne Desmarteau, Montreal

July 22

Yugoslavia	88–87	Italy

Centre Étienne Desmarteau, Montreal

July 22

Forfeited

United States	2–0	Egypt

Centre Étienne Desmarteau, Montreal

July 24

United States	81–76	Czechoslovakia

Centre Étienne Desmarteau, Montreal

July 24

Forfeited

Yugoslavia	2–0	Egypt

Centre Étienne Desmarteau, Montreal

July 24

Italy	95–81	Puerto Rico

Centre Étienne Desmarteau, Montreal

=== Knockout stage ===
==== Championship bracket ====
Semifinals (July 26)
A1	Soviet Union	84
B2	Yugoslavia	89
B1	United States	95
A2	Canada	77

Gold medal (July 27)
B2	Yugoslavia	74
B1	United States	95
Bronze medal (July 27)
A1	Soviet Union	100
A2	Canada	72

==== Classification brackets ====
5th–8th Place

Semifinals (July 25)
A3	Cuba	76
B4	Czechoslovakia	91
B3	Italy	79
A4	Australia	72

5th place (July 27)
B4	Czechoslovakia	75
B3	Italy	98
7th place (July 27)
A3	Cuba	92
A4	Australia	81

9th–12th Place

Semifinals (July 25)
A5	Mexico	2
B6	Egypt	0^{[d]}
B5	Puerto Rico	111
A6	Japan	91

9th place (July 27)
A5	Mexico	84
B5	Puerto Rico	89
11th place (July 27)
B6	Egypt	0^{[d]}
A6	Japan	2

^{d} Forfeited match.

== Women's tournament ==
The first Olympic Basketball Tournament for Women consisted of a single round-robin group, where final standings were determined by the group rankings. The Soviet team finished undefeated and won the gold medal, while the American team won the silver medal through a victory over the Bulgarian team that broke the tie between the two teams in favor of the American team.

Pos	Team	Pld	W	L	PF	PA	PD	Pts
1	Soviet Union	5	5	0	504	346	+158	10
2	United States	5	3	2	415	417	−2	8
3	Bulgaria	5	3	2	365	377	−12	8
4	Czechoslovakia	5	2	3	351	359	−8	7
5	Japan	5	2	3	405	400	+5	7
6	Canada (H)	5	0	5	336	477	−141	5

Source: FIBA archive
Rules for classification: 1) points; 2) head-to-head points; 3) head-to-head goal average; 4) head-to-head number of points scored.
(H) Hosts

July 19

United States	71–84	Japan

Centre Étienne Desmarteau, Montreal

July 19

Soviet Union	115–51	Canada

Centre Étienne Desmarteau, Montreal

July 19

Czechoslovakia	66–67	Bulgaria

Centre Étienne Desmarteau, Montreal

July 20

Japan	121–89	Canada

Centre Étienne Desmarteau, Montreal

July 20

United States	95–79	Bulgaria

Centre Étienne Desmarteau, Montreal

July 20

Czechoslovakia	75–88	Soviet Union

Centre Étienne Desmarteau, Montreal

July 22

Bulgaria	68–91	Soviet Union

Centre Étienne Desmarteau, Montreal

July 22

Japan	62–76	Czechoslovakia

Centre Étienne Desmarteau, Montreal

July 22

United States	89–75	Canada

Centre Étienne Desmarteau, Montreal

July 23

Bulgaria	66–63	Japan

Centre Étienne Desmarteau, Montreal

July 23

Canada	59–67	Czechoslovakia

Centre Étienne Desmarteau, Montreal

July 23

United States	77–112	Soviet Union

Centre Étienne Desmarteau, Montreal

July 25

Canada	62–85	Bulgaria

Montreal Forum, Montreal

July 26

United States	83–67	Czechoslovakia

Montreal Forum, Montreal

July 26

Soviet Union	98–75	Japan

Montreal Forum, Montreal

== Final standings ==
Rank	Men				Women			
Rank	Team	Pld	W	L	Team	Pld	W	L
1st place, gold medalist(s)	United States	7	7	0	Soviet Union	5	5	0
2nd place, silver medalist(s)	Yugoslavia	7	5	2	United States	5	3	2
3rd place, bronze medalist(s)	Soviet Union	7	6	1	Bulgaria	5	3	2
4th	Canada	7	4	3	Czechoslovakia	5	2	3
5th	Italy	7	5	2	Japan	5	2	3
6th	Czechoslovakia	7	3	4	Canada	5	0	5
7th	Cuba	7	4	3				
8th	Australia	7	2	5				
9th	Puerto Rico	7	3	4				
10th	Mexico	7	2	5				
11th	Japan	7	1	6				
12th	Egypt	7	0	7				

== See also ==
- Basketball at the 1976 Summer Olympics – Men's team rosters
- Basketball at the 1976 Summer Olympics – Women's team rosters
