= Stoyanovich =

Stoyanovich is a Slavic patronymic surname, meaning son of Stoyan. Notable people with the surname include:

- Julia Stoyanovich, American computer scientist
- Pete Stoyanovich (born 1967), American football player
- Steve Stoyanovich (born 1957), Canadian ice hockey player
