= Stojanovski =

Stojanovski (Macedonian: Стојановски) or Stojanoski is a Macedonian surname that literally means "son of Stojan", with its feminine forms being Stojanovska or Stojanoska. Notable people with the surname include:

== Stojanovski ==
- Aleksandar Stojanovski (born 1983), Macedonian footballer
- Aleksandar Stojanovski (alpine skier) (born 1979), Macedonian alpine skier
- Damjan Stojanovski (born 1987), Macedonian basketball player
- Filip Stojanovski (born 1996), Macedonian footballer
- Luka Stojanovski (born 2000), Macedonian basketball player
- Ognen Stojanovski (born 1984), Macedonian basketball player
- Miroslav Stojanovski (born 1959), Macedonian military officer
- Vlatko Stojanovski (born 1997), Macedonian footballer
- Vojdan Stojanovski (born 1987), Macedonian basketball player
- Renato Stojanovski (born 2003), Mozzart Bet owner

== Stojanoski ==
- Milan Stojanoski (born 1973), Macedonian football manager and former player

== Stojanovska ==
- Vesna Stojanovska (born 1985), Macedonian swimmer

== Stojanoska ==
- Ana Stojanoska (born 1977), Macedonian theatre researcher and writer
- Jasmina Stojanoska (born 1987), Macedonian footballer
- Vesna Stojanoska, Macedonian-American mathematician

== See also ==
- Stojanov
