= Stoyan =

Stoyan (Bulgarian: Стоян) is a Bulgarian name derived from the verb stoya (стоя 'to stand'). The variant Stoian also appears in Serbian, Romanian, and in northern Greece as Stogiannis (Στογιάννης).

== Given name ==
- Stoyan Stoyanov (b. 1995), Bulgarian Mechanical Engineer
- Stoyan Abrashev (b. 1988), Bulgarian footballer
- Stoyan Alexandrov (1949–2020), Bulgarian economist
- Stoyan Apostolov (b. 1946), Bulgarian wrestler
- Stoyan Balov (b. 1960), Bulgarian wrestler
- Stoyan Danev (1858–1949), Bulgarian liberal politician and twice Prime Minister
- Stoyan Deltchev (b. 1959), Bulgarian gymnast
- Stoyan Gadev (1931–1999), Bulgarian actor
- Stoyan Ganev (1955–2013), Bulgarian diplomat and politician
- Stoyan Gunchev (b. 1958), Bulgarian volleyball player
- Stoyan Georgiev (b. 1986), Bulgarian footballer
- Stoyan N. Karastoyanoff, American architect
- Stoyan Kitov (b. 1938), Bulgarian footballer
- Stoyan Kolev (b. 1976), Bulgarian goalkeeper
- Stoyan Nikolov (b. 1949), Bulgarian wrestler
- Stoyan Mihaylovski (1856–1927), Bulgarian writer
- Stoyan Stoyanov Mihaylovski (1812–1875), Bulgarian cleric
- Stoyan Ormandzhiev (1920–2006), Bulgarian footballer and manager
- Stoyan Petkov, Bulgarian prelate
- Stoyan Petrov, Bulgarian photographer
- Stoyan Predev (b. 1993), Bulgarian footballer
- Stoyan Radev, Bulgarian film and theatre director
- Stoyan Stavrev (b. 1975), Bulgarian goalkeeper
- Stoyan Stefanov (b. 1983), Bulgarian footballer
- Stoyan Stoyanov (1913–1994), Bulgarian fighter pilot
- Stoyan Yankoulov (b. 1966), Bulgarian drummer
- Stoyan Yordanov (1944–2025), Bulgarian footballer
- Stoyan Zagorchinov 1889–1969, Bulgarian writer
- Stoyan Zaimov (1853–1932), Bulgarian revolutionary
- Stoyan Zlatev (b. 1954), Bulgarian pentathlete
- Stojan Todorchev (b. 1984), Bulgarian strongman

== Surname ==
- Denys Stoyan, Ukrainian football defender
- Dietrich Stoyan, German mathematician and statistician
- Maksym Stoyan (1980–), Ukrainian footballer

== See also ==
- Stoyanov
- Stojan
- Stoian
- Stojanov
- Ilias Stogiannis
- Stoyan Bachvarov Dramatic Theatre, a theatre in Varna
