= Stojaković =

Stojaković (Serbian Cyrillic: Стојаковић) is a Serbian surname. Notable people with the surname include:

- Đorđe Stojaković (1810–1863), Serbian political activist, lawyer and revolutionary
- Igor Stojaković (born 1980), Serbian football player
- Jadranka Stojaković (1950–2016), Serbian singer-songwriter
- Nenad Stojaković (born 1980), Serbian football midfielder
- Peja Stojaković (born 1977), Serbian basketball player

== See also ==
- Stojanović, a surname
- Stojković, a surname
