= Stojko =

Stojko is a South Slavic given name, a diminutive form of Stojan. Notable people with the name include:

- Stojko Vranković, Croatian basketball player

Stojko is also a South Slavic surname. Notable people with the surname include:

- Elvis Stojko, Canadian figure skater of Slovene-Hungarian descent

== See also ==
- Stoyko
