= Stoenești =

Stoeneşti may refer to several places in Romania:

- Stoenești, Argeș, a commune in Argeș County
- Stoenești, Giurgiu, a commune in Giurgiu County
- Stoenești, Olt, a commune in Olt County
- Stoenești, Vâlcea, a commune in Vâlcea County
- Stoenești, a village in Modelu Commune, Călărași County
- Stoenești, a village in Florești-Stoenești Commune, Giurgiu County
- Stoenești, a village in Ariceștii Rahtivani Commune, Prahova County
- Stoenești, a village in Berislăvești Commune, Vâlcea County
- Stoienești, a village in Frecăței Commune, Brăila County

== See also ==
- Stoian (name)
