= Astragalus wilmottianus =

Scientific classification
- Kingdom: Plantae
- Clade: Embryophytes
- Clade: Tracheophytes
- Clade: Spermatophytes
- Clade: Angiosperms
- Clade: Eudicots
- Clade: Rosids
- Order: Fabales
- Family: Fabaceae
- Subfamily: Faboideae
- Genus: Astragalus
- Species: A. wilmottianus

Binomial name
- Astragalus wilmottianus Stoj.

Synonyms
- Astragalus testiculatus var. wilmottianus (Stoj.) Stoj. & Stef.

Species of flowering plant

Astragalus wilmottianus is a species of flowering plant in the family Fabaceae. It is a perennial.

The species is native to Bulgaria, and was described in 1926.

== Taxonomy ==
The species was described by Nikolai Andreev Stojanov in 1926.

== Distribution ==
Astragalus wilmottianus is native to the temperate biome of western Bulgaria.

== Nomenclature ==
In Bulgarian, the species is known as Вилмотианов клин (Vilmotianov klin).
