= Stojan =

Stojan (Cyrillic: Стојан) is a masculine given name of Slavic origin. The name derived from the Slavic verb 'to stand'. The variants Stoyan and Stoyan also appear in Bulgarian language, Romanian, and in northern Greece as Stogiannis (Στογιάννης).

Notable people with the name include:

- Stojan Gjuroski (born 1991), basketball player
- Stojan Andov (born 1935), politician
- Stojan Aralica (1883–1980), painter
- Stojan Čupić (1765–1815), military leader
- Stojan Ignatov (born 1979), footballer
- Stojan Janković (1636–1687), military leader
- Stojan Lukić (born 1979), football goalkeeper
- Stojan Novaković (1842–1915), scholar and politician
- Stojan Pilipović (born 1987), footballer
- Stojan Protić (1857–1923), politician
- Stojan Vranješ (born 1986), footballer

== See also ==
- Stoyan
  - Stoyanov, Stoyko, Stoykov from the same root, in Bulgarian
- Stojanov
- Stojanović
- Stoian
