= Stojačić =

Stojačić is a Serbian surname. Notable people with the surname include:

- Stefan Stojačić (born 1989), Serbian professional basketball player
- Strahinja Stojačić (born 1992), Serbian professional basketball player

== See also ==
- Stojanović, a surname
- Stojković, a surname
- Stojmenović, a surname
