= Stoykov =

Stoykov (Bulgarian: Стойков; also appearing in the transliteration variants Stoikov, Stojkov, Stoikow or Stoykow) – with its female form Stoykova (Bulgarian: Стойкова) – is a Bulgarian surname which is derived from the male given name Stoyko (also as Stojko—also found in Slovenian—or Stoiko), which in itself comes from the imperative form стой of the Bulgarian verb стоя "to stand", "to stop."

Notable people with the name Stoykov include:

- Angel Stoykov (born 1977), former Bulgarian footballer
- Dame Stoykov (born 1968), Bulgarian judoka
- Elvis Stojko (born 1972), Canadian figure skater of Slovenian ancestry
- Georgi Stoykov Rakovski (1821–1867), Bulgarian revolutionary, freemason and writer
- Kostadin Stoykov (born 1977), former Bulgarian volleyball player
- Krasimir Stoykov (born 1955), former Bulgarian swimmer
- Lubomir Stoykov (born 1954), Bulgarian fashion TV journalist and fashion critic
- Maksim Stoykov (born 1991), Bulgarian footballer
- Stoyko Stoykov (1912–1969), Bulgarian linguist
- Todor Stoykov (born 1977), Bulgarian retired basketball player
- Veselin Stoykov (born 1986), Bulgarian footballer
- Vesselin Stoykov (born 1973), German opera singer and manager of Bulgarian origin
- Yordan Stoykov (born 1951), Bulgarian retired football player and manager
- Zlatan Stoykov (born 1951), Bulgarian general
