= Stoyko =

Stoyko (Cyrillic: Стойко) is a Bulgarian male given name and Slavic surname. Notable people with the name include:

== Given name ==
- Stoyko Gochev (born 1965), Bulgarian gymnast
- Stoyko Khadilev (born 1957), Bulgarian rower
- Stoyko Kolev (born 1986), Bulgarian football player
- Stoyko Lipchev (born 1945), Bulgarian fencer
- Stoyko Malov (born 1943), Bulgarian wrestler
- Stoyko Sakaliev (born 1979), Bulgarian football player
- Stoyko Stoykov (1912–1969), Bulgarian linguist
- Stoyko Tsonov (born 1969), Bulgarian triple jumper

== Surname ==
- Dmytro Stoyko (born 1975), Ukrainian football player
- Elvis Stoyko (born 1972), Canadian figure skater
- Ivan Stoyko (born 1961), Ukrainian politician
- Nicolas Stoyko (1894–1976), Ukrainian-French astronomer

== See also ==
- Stojko
