= Montréal Mission =

National Ringette League ringette team based in Montreal, Quebec

- City: (Quebec) Montréal, Québec
- League: National Ringette League
- Conference: Eastern
- Division: White
- Founded: 2004
- Home arena: Centre Étienne Desmarteau
- Colours
- General manager: France Levert
- Head coach: Daniel Dussault
- Affiliates: Montréal Mission Under-19; Ligue Élite de Ringuette du Québec (LERQ)
- Website: NRL.ca
Home colours	Away colours

Championships
- NRL Titles: 0
- Best result: 2nd (2008, 2012, 2023)

The Montréal Mission (French: Misson de Montréal) is a ringette team in the National Ringette League (NRL), competing in the White Division of the Eastern Conference. The team was founded in 2004. The team gathers its players from the region of Montréal, Québec, and plays its home games at Centre Étienne Desmarteau.

The "Mission" is one of the NRL's most successful teams from Quebec. During the COVID-19 pandemic, the team did not compete in the NRL Championships. In the past the Mission also competed against Bourassa Royal before that NRL team was discontinued.

== Team history ==
The Montréal Mission, or, "the Mission", is a ringette team in the National Ringette League from Quebec which first formed in 2004. It is Quebec's NRL team with the best record in the league's history. The team was previously ranked second in the Eastern Conference of the National Ringette League behind one of Ontario's teams, the Cambridge Turbos. The Mission finished in second place for two NRL seasons: 2010-11 and 2009-10. In 2008-09, the team ended its season at the top of the NRL standings for the NRL Eastern Conference with two points more than the Cambridge Turbos.

In 2006 the team acquired Anna Vanhatalo, "The Montreal Mission is proud to welcome Anna Vanhatalo to its family. Anna is an exchange student at the University of Montreal and a valued member of the Mission team." Vanhatalo played for the Mission for one season. Her Ringeten SM-sarja team in Finland, Helsinki Ringette, received Montreal Mission goalkeeper Claudia Jetté in exchange.

== League competition 2022–23 season ==
In 2022–23, the NRL entered its 18th season with thirteen teams competing:

Western Conference

- BC Thunder
- Edmonton Black Gold Rush
- Edmonton WAM!
- Calgary RATH
- Saskatchewan Heat
- Manitoba Herd

Eastern Conference Red

- Nepean Ravens
- Waterloo Wildfire
- Gatineau Fusion
- Cambridge Turbos

Eastern Conference White

- Montreal Mission
- Rive-Sud Révolution
- Atlantic Attack

== Leading scorers ==
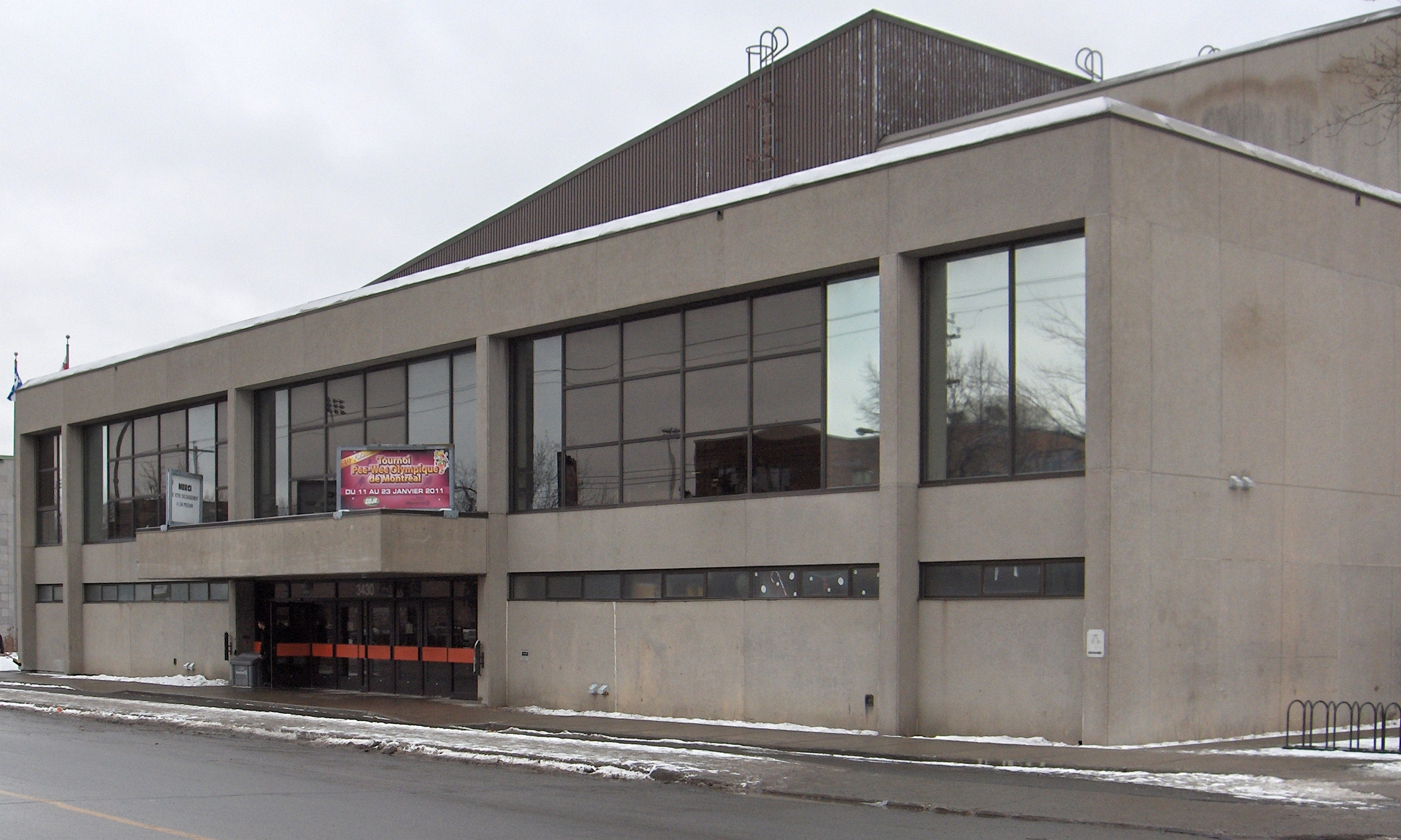
The Montréal Mission plays its home games at Centre Étienne Desmarteau

In 2009-2010, two Montreal Mission players dominated the National Ringette League standings in scoring: Catherine Cartier with 122 points (1st), and 110 points for Julie Blanchette (2nd). In addition, Stéphanie Séguin made 83 points placing 4th. In 2010-11, the two players dominating the standings of the league for scores and assists where the Mission's Blanchette with 141 points placing 1st, and 132 points for Cartier who finished in 2nd.

Season	Players	Matches	Goals	Assists	Points	Leading scorers
2010–2011	Julie Blanchette	31	61	80	141	1 (Best scorer in the League)
2009–2010	Catherine Cartier	31	77	45	122	1 (Best scorer in the League)
2008–2009	Julie Blanchette	31	54	80	134	2
2007–2008	Catherine Cartier	30	111	44	155	1 (Best scorer in the League)

== Regular season records ==
Season	Matches	Win	Losses	Lost with shootout	Points	Goals for	Goals against	Standings
2007–08	29	13	15	1	27	144	162	8
2008–09	31	29	1	1	59	254	96	1
2009–10	31	27	2	2	56	241	100	2
2010–11	22	19	3	0	38	193	87	2
2011-12	30	28	2	0	56	228	97	1
2012-13	28	24	4	0	48	263	145	1
2013-14	26	23	3	0	46	237	135	2
2014-15	28	20	7	1	41	252	143	3
2015-16	28	21	5	2	44	232	179	2
2016-17	24	15	8	1	31	152	133	5
2017–18	22	18	3	1	37	165	112	2
Total seasons: 11	308	244	53	11	499			

== Playoff records ==
Season	Matches	Win	Losses	Lost with prolongation	Lost with shootout	Points	Goals for	Goals against	Summary
2011	7	4	3	0	0	2	52	36	Elite Eight: 8th Record: 1-3-0 (3-0-0 record in additional round)
2012	10	8	2	0	0	16	59	40	Elite Eight: 1st Record: 6-1-0 – Won 2 game to 0 against Waterloo Wildfire in knockout stage – Lost 2-7 against LMRL Thunder in Final
2013	9	4	4	1	0	8	54	50	Elite Eight: 6th Record: 2-4-1OTL – Won 2 games to 0 against La Royal de Bourassa in knockout stage
2014	7	3	4	0	0	6	36	39	Elite Eight: 6th Record: 3-4-0
2015	7	3	4	0	0	6	43	53	Elite Eight: 6th Record: 3-4-0
2016	7	3	4	0	0	6	33	49	Elite Eight: 5th Record: 3-4-0
2017	3	1	2	0	0	2	12	15	Lost 2 games to 1 against Waterloo Wildfire in knockout stage
2018	7	2	4	1	0	4	37	49	Elite Eight: 6th Record: 2-4-1
Total	57	28	27	2	0	56			
Total: regular season+playoff	365	272	80	2	11	555			

== Rosters ==
=== 2022-23 ===
The following is the roster for the 2022–23 National Ringette League season.

2022–23 Montreal Mission
#	Player	Pos
	Camille Trudel	
	Laurence Pellerin	
1	Annie Trudel (AP/GUEST)	Goalie
5	Kamille Duquette	Defence
9	Allyson Savoie	Defence
10	Marie-Pier Blanchard	Centre
11	Charlie Maillé	Forward
18	Marta Matuszewski	Defense
23	Élizabeth Moreau	Defense
27	Marie-Ève Dubé	Goalie
32	Laurence Mallette-Léonard	Goalie
51	Megane Fortin	Forward
55	Mélanie Daraiche	Forward
66	Stéphanie Séguin	Forward
70	Alexandra Trudel	Defence
87	Raphaëlle Chouinard	Defence
88	Cortney Keeble	Defence
91	Émilie Brule	Forward
95	Jade Dupuis	Forward
96	Annie-Pier Séguin	Defence
99	Julie Blanchette	

=== 2011-12 ===
The following is the roster for the 2011–2012 National Ringette League season.

No	Player	Position	S/G	Age	Birthplace
4	Katherine Fallon-Simard	F	L	25	St-Hilaire, Canada
10	Julie-Ève Finn	D	L	19	Iles-des-Sœurs, Canada
17	Natali St-Germain	F	L	20	Montréal, Canada
18	Lynn Despiegelaere	F	L	31	Montreal, Canada
27	Kim Aspirot	F	L	20	Repentigny, Canada
30	Laurie Mathieu	G	L	19	Boucherville, Canada
31	Kathleen Perreault	G	R	21	Montreal, Canada
33	Claudia Jetté	G	R	35	St-Laurent, Canada
36	Arielle Sanschagrin	F	R	19	Montréal, Canada
44	Julie Primard	F	R	29	St-Constant, Canada
47	Véronike Dufort	D	L	21	Sainte-Catherine, Canada
66	Stéphanie Séguin	F	L	30	St-Laurent, Canada
77	Kassy Chhim	D	L	35	Boucherville, Canada
79	Karine Seguin	D	L	31	Saint-Laurent, Canada
87	Edith King	D	L	26	Repentigny, Canada
93	Catherine Cartier	C	L	34	Montreal, Canada
96	Annie-Pier Séguin	F	L	22	Kirkland, Canada
99	Julie Blanchette	C	L	35	Montreal, Canada

Coaching staff

- General Manager: France Levert
- Head Coach: Daniel Dussault

== World Championship connection ==
Several players from the Montréal Mission have been chosen to represent Canada for the World Ringette Championships. Some players have also become coaches for the Canada national ringette team.

=== Players ===
Canada's World Ringette Championship teams have included these notable players:

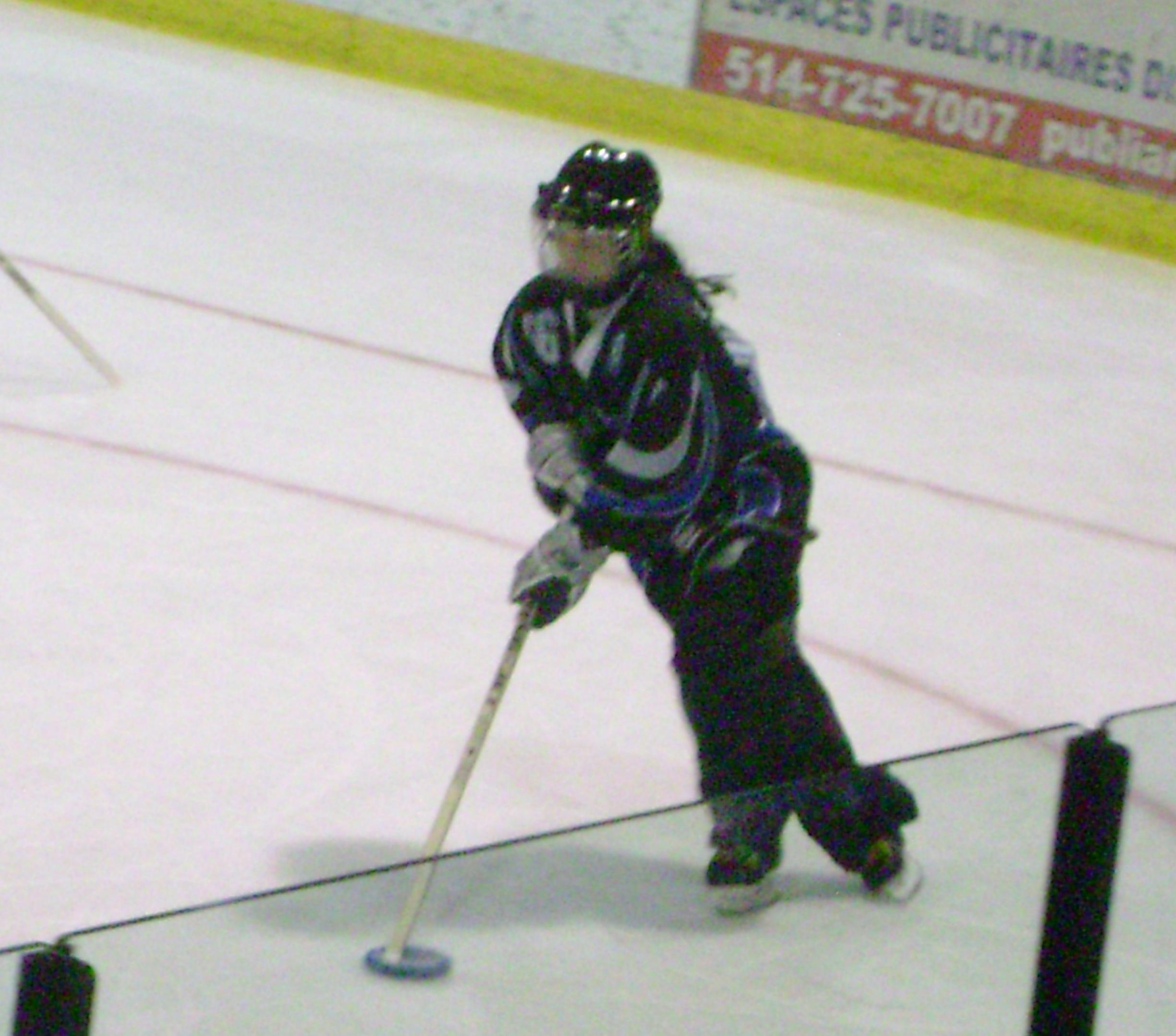
Stéphanie Séguin, 2004 forward

Year	Players
WRC 2010	2010 Team Canada Sr. (Canada) Julie Blanchette (Canada) Stéphanie Séguin (United States) Catherine Cartier
WRC 2007	2007 Team Canada Sr. (Canada) Julie Blanchette (Canada) Stéphanie Séguin (Canada) Claudia Jetté (United States) Melanie Thomas (United States) Catherine Cartier
WRC 2004	2004 Team Canada Sr. (Canada) Julie Blanchette (Canada) Stéphanie Séguin (United States) Melanie Thomas

=== Coaches ===
Canada's World Ringette Championship teams have included these players turned coach:

Year	Coaches
WRC 2013	Julie Blanchette, Assistant coach, 2013 Team Canada Sr.
WJRC 2009	Julie Blanchette, Assistant coach, 2009 U19 Team Canada East
WRC 2022	Julie Blanchette, Assistant coach, 2022 Team Canada Sr.

== Other teams ==
The Montreal Mission have competed against a number of other NRL teams including the Bourassa Royal, Cambridge Turbos, Calgary RATH, Rive-Sud Révolution, and the Atlantic Attack.

== Gallery ==
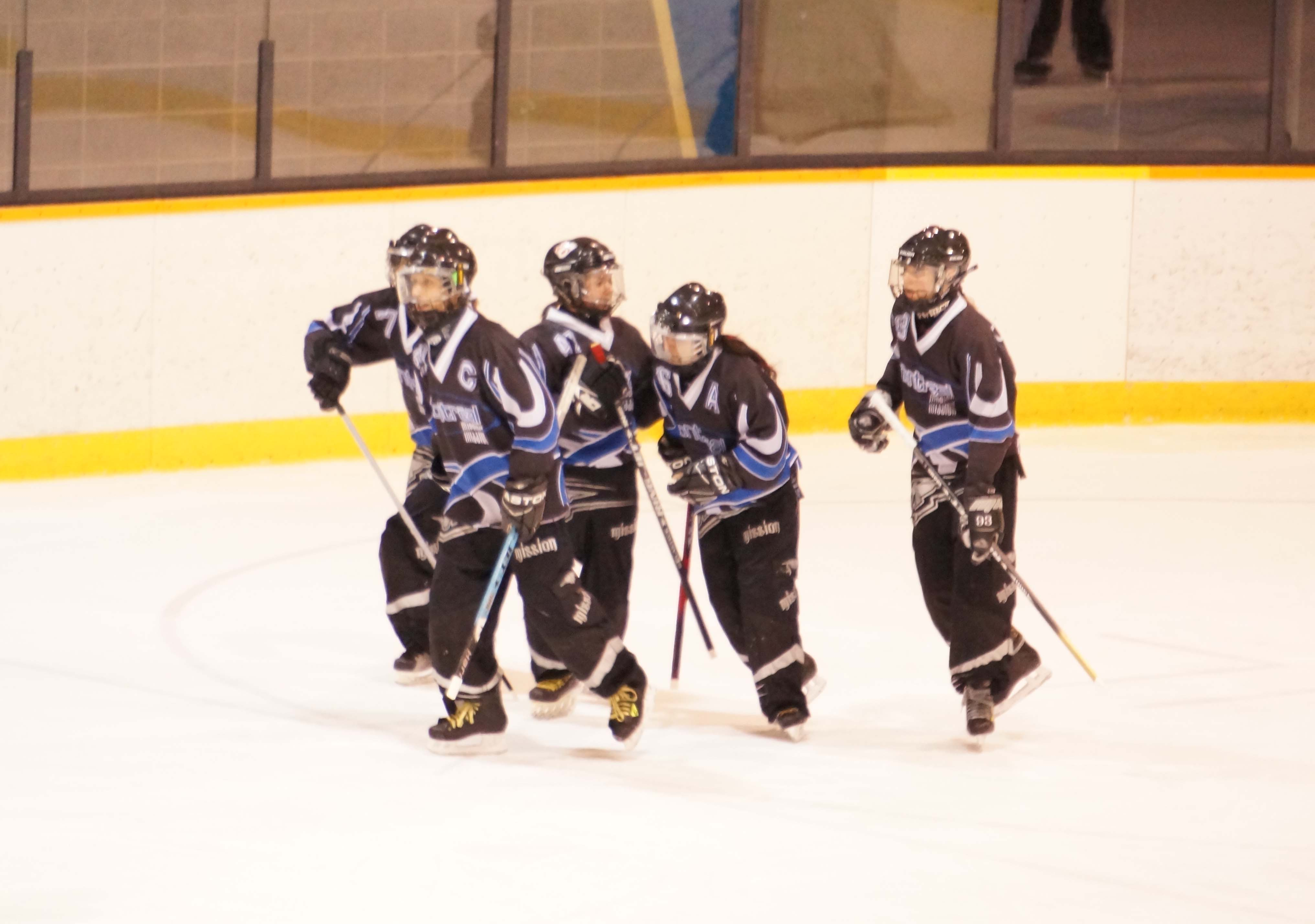
Montreal Mission in 2012

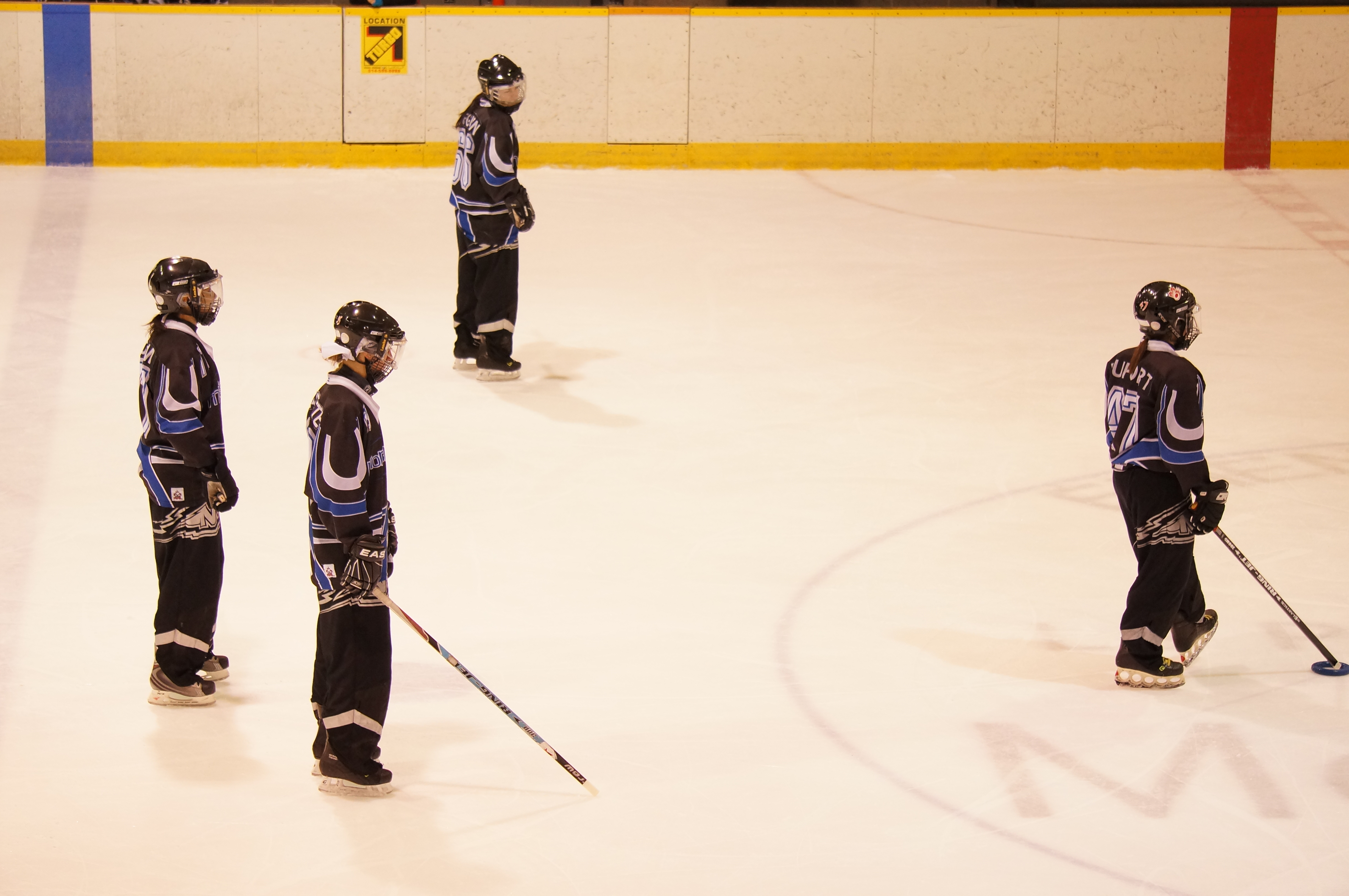
Montreal Mission centre ice free pass in 2012

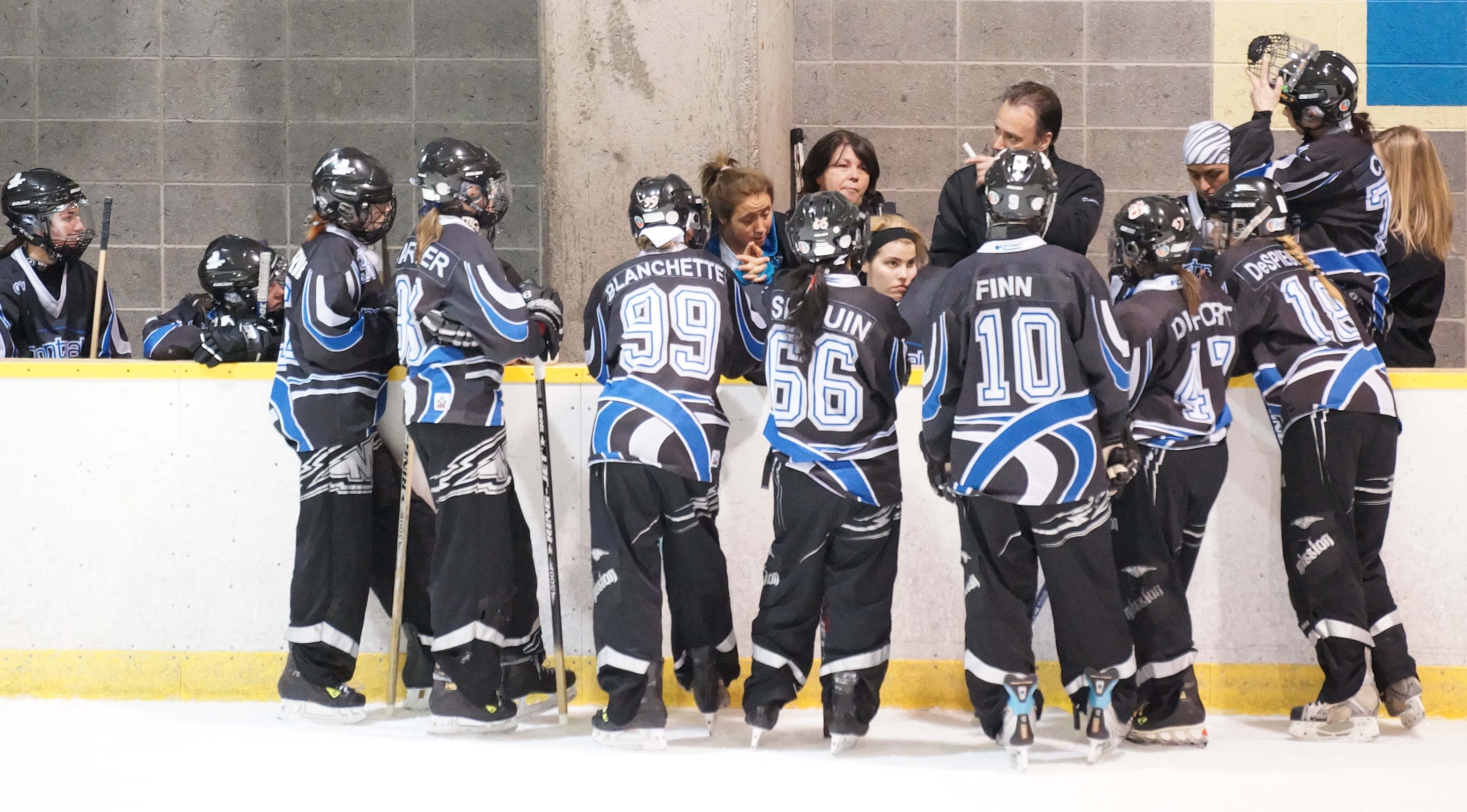
Team gathering around the bench discussing strategy

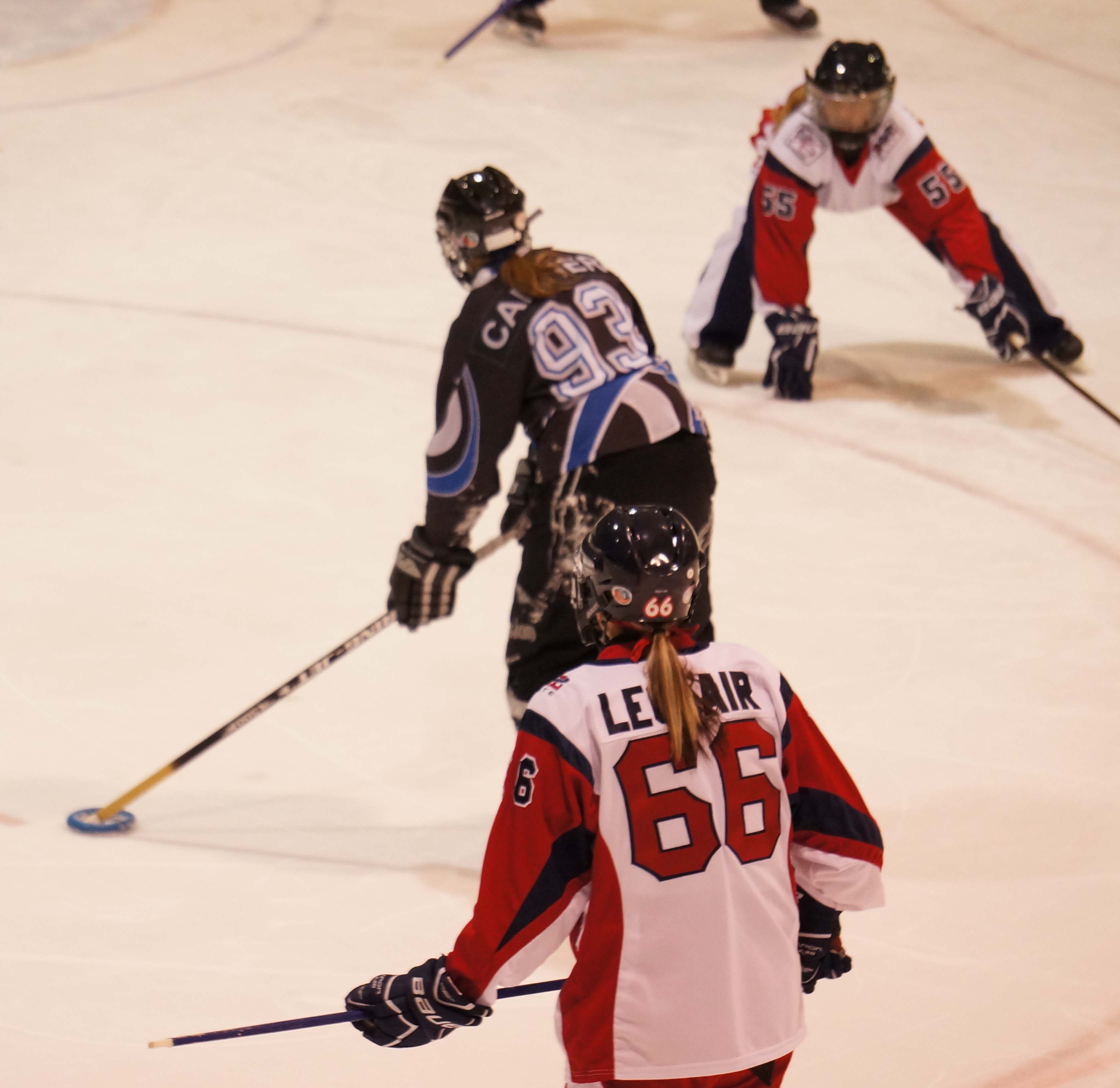
Montreal Mission player in 2012

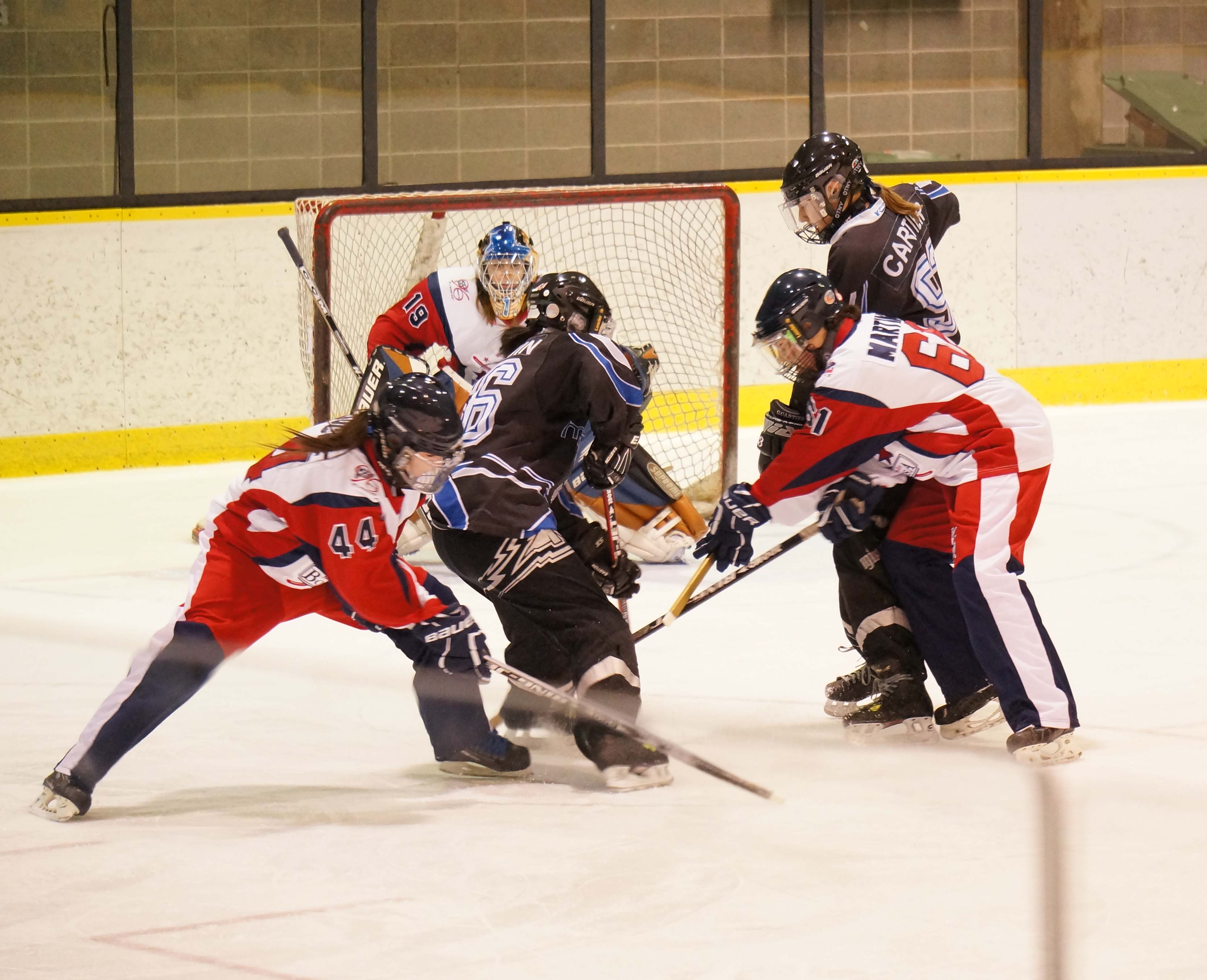
Bourassa Royal vs Montreal Mission in 2012

== See also ==
- Ringette
- National Ringette League
- Cambridge Turbos
- Atlantic Attack
- Bourassa Royal
- Calgary RATH
- Rive-Sud Révolution
