= Dimitar Stoyanov =

Dimitar Stoyanov may refer to:

- Radoy Ralin (Dimitar Stoyanov, 1923–2004), Bulgarian dissident, poet and satirist
- Dimitar Stoyanov (politician) (born 1983), Bulgarian and EU politician
- Dimitar Stoyanov (actor) (born 1938), Bulgarian theatre director and actor
- Dimitar Stoyanov (wrestler) (born 1931), Bulgarian Olympic wrestler
- Dimitar Stoyanov (footballer) (born 2001), Bulgarian footballer
- Dimitar Stoyanov (military officer) (born 1968), Bulgarian military officer and politician
