= Stojići =

Stojići may refer to

- Stojići, Bugojno, village in Bosnia and Herzegovina
- Stojići, Kosjerić, village in Serbia

== See also ==
- Stojić, people with the surname
