= Margarita Shtarkelova =

Bulgarian basketball player

Olympic medal record

Women's basketball

Representing Bulgaria
Bronze medal – third place	1976 Montreal	Team competition

Margarita Shtarkelova (Bulgarian: Маргарита Щъркелова; 5 July 1951 – 16 January 2025) was a Bulgarian basketball player who competed in the 1976 Summer Olympics.
