= Konstantin Dzhelepov =

Bulgarian fencer

Personal information
- Born: 21 April 1950 (age 76)

Sport
- Sport: Fencing

Konstantin Dzhelepov (Bulgarian: Константин Джелепов, born 21 April 1950) is a Bulgarian fencer. He competed in the individual and team sabre events at the 1976 Summer Olympics.
