= Stojić =

Stojić (Serbian Cyrillic: Стојић) is a surname. Notable people with the surname include:

- Bruno Stojić (born 1955), Bosnian Croat politician
- Dijana Stojić (born 1988), Croatian former tennis player
- Mario Stojić (born 1980), Croatian basketball player
- Nemanja Stojić (born 1998), Serbian football player
- Nikola Stojić (born 1974), Serbian rower
- Ranko Stojić (born 1959), Serbian football player and manager

== See also ==
- Stojići (disambiguation)
