= Gergina Skerlatova =

Bulgarian basketball player

Olympic medal record

Women's basketball

Representing Bulgaria
Bronze medal – third place	1976 Montreal	Team competition

Girgina Skerlatova (Bulgarian: Гиргина Скерлатова; born 25 March 1954) is a Bulgarian former basketball player who competed in the 1976 Summer Olympics.
