= Ivan Popov (cyclist) =

Bulgarian cyclist

Personal information
- Born: 23 March 1951 Gorna Malina, Bulgaria
- Died: June 2014

Cycling career
- Sport: Cycling

Ivan Popov (Bulgarian: Иван Попов; 23 March 1951 – June 2014) was a Bulgarian cyclist. He competed in the individual road race and team time trial events at the 1976 Summer Olympics.
