= Dimitar Stoyanov (actor) =

Bulgarian actor (1938–2011)

Dimitar Stoyanov Димитър Стоянов
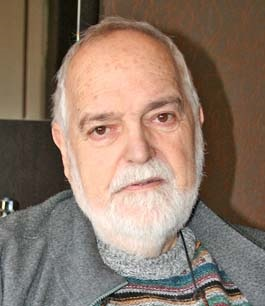
- Born: Dimitar Stefanov Stoyanov; November 26, 1938; Varna, Bulgaria
- Died: June 17, 2011 (aged 72) near Strazhitsa, Bulgaria
- Occupations: Actor and Theatre Director
- Years active: 1963 - 2011

Dimitar Stefanov Stoyanov (Bulgarian: Димитър Стоянов; 26 November 1938 – 17 June 2011) was a Bulgarian stage actor, theatre director and assistant Professor.

== Career ==
Born in Varna, he graduated high school in his hometown. After that, he graduated in acting from NATFA in the class of Professor Filip Filipov. He specialized in directing in Moscow and Leningrad. He worked for four years as an actor in Dobrich theatre and two years as a director in the theaters of Veliko Tarnovo and Pleven. He accepted the invitation of his professor to be his assistant and after winning a competition became a lecturer at NATFIZ. While specializing in the Soviet Union, he continued directing his commitment to theater "Tears and Laughter" (Сълза и смях). Since 1998 he has been a freelancer in several productions at various theaters in Bulgaria and abroad and always happy to return to his native city, where he raised the "Fisherman's Disputes" ("Рибарски свади") by Carlo Goldoni, "Dr." from Branislav Nušić "Cannibal Woman" ("Човекоядката") by Ivan Radoev. His last performances before his death are "Desire Under the Elms" by Eugene O'Neill and "Urnebesna Tragedija" (Урбулешка Трагедия) by Dusan Kovacevic.

== Death ==
Dimitar Stoyanov died on June 17, 2011, the day after the premiere of play "Urbuleshka tragedy." He died on European route E772 from Varna to Sofia in the area around Strazhitsa after he traveled to Sofia.The cause of his death was haemorrhagic stroke.

== Filmography ==
Year	Film	Role	Notes
1987	Levakat / The Mooncalf	Gardener / Градинар	Bulgarian: Левакът
