= Nadka Golcheva =

Bulgarian basketball player

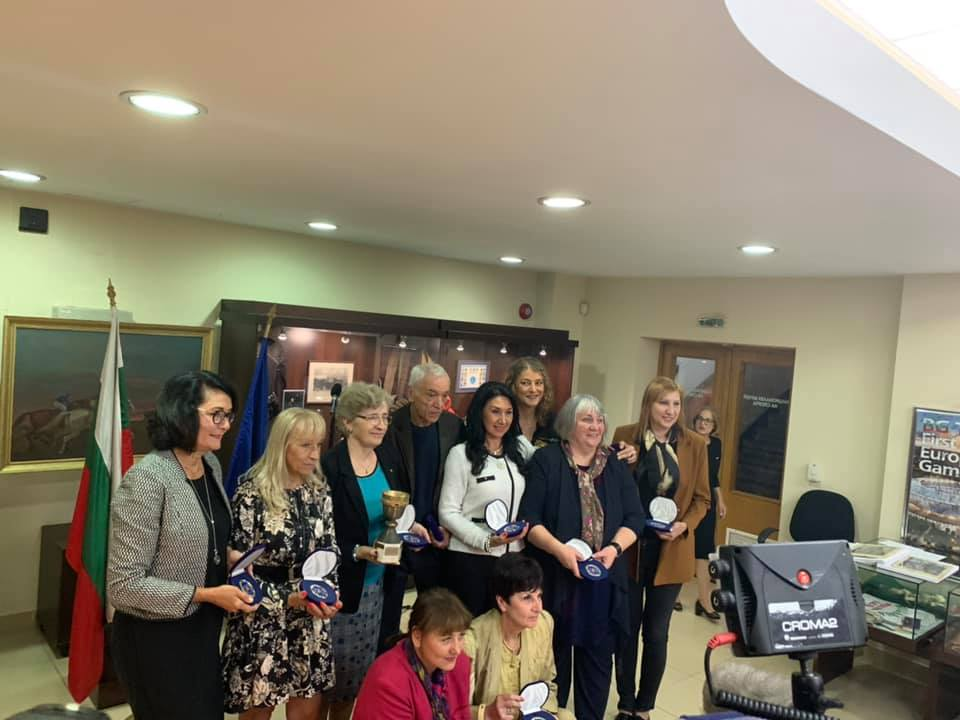
- Nadka Golcheva (third from left) with her teammates

Personal information
- Born: 12 March 1952 (age 74) Petrich, Bulgaria
- Listed height: 1.73 m (5 ft 8 in)
- Listed weight: 63 kg (139 lb)

Career information
- Playing career: 1969–1987
- Position: Shooting guard
- Number: 6

Career history
- 1969–1987: WBC Levski Sofia

Career highlights
- 6× Bulgarian Women's Basketball League champion (1980, 1983–1987); 8× Bulgarian Women's Basketball Cup champion (1974, 1976, 1977, 1980, 1983, 1985–1987)
Medals
Representing Bulgaria
Olympic Games
Silver medal – second place	1980 Moskva	Team competition
Bronze medal – third place	1976 Montreal	Team competition
EuroBasket Women
Silver medal – second place	1972 Bulgaria
Bronze medal – third place	1976 France
Silver medal – second place	1983 Hungary
Ronchetti Cup
Gold medal – first place	1978
Gold medal – first place	1979
EuroLeague Women
Gold medal – first place	1984

Nadka Vangelova Golcheva (Bulgarian: Надка Вангелова Голчева, née Stoeva (Стоева); born 12 March 1952) is a Bulgarian former basketball player who represented Bulgaria internationally from 1969 to 1983. She competed at two Olympic Games, winning a bronze medal at the 1976 Summer Olympics and a silver medal at the 1980 Summer Olympics.

Golcheva spent her entire club career with WBC Levski Sofia, where she was a central figure during the most successful era in the club's history. She later became one of the most decorated players in Bulgarian women's basketball, achieving major success at both club and national team level.

== Early life ==
Nadka Golcheva was born near Petrich, Bulgaria, where she grew up in a working-class family as the youngest of four children. Like many children of her generation during the communist period in Bulgaria, she was introduced to organized sports at an early age and initially focused on athletics, which helped develop her physical conditioning and coordination.

Her transition to basketball occurred after a local coach noticed her height, movement, and competitive mindset and invited her to join the basketball team. Although her parents were initially cautious about a sporting career, Golcheva later recalled that her brother played a decisive role in supporting and motivating her during her early development. As her involvement in basketball increased, the sport gradually became her primary focus.

By the mid-1960s, Golcheva was already competing at a high level in school competitions. In 1967, her school team won a regional championship, and a year later she was selected for the Bulgarian youth national team, marking her first involvement with the national basketball system. In 1969, at the age of 17, she moved to Sofia to join WBC Levski, beginning her senior playing career and a long association with one of the most successful clubs in Bulgarian women's basketball.

== Club career ==
Golcheva spent the entirety of her senior club career with WBC Levski, joining the club in 1969 after moving to the capital from Petrich. Her arrival marked the beginning of a long and successful association with Levski, during which she became one of the central figures of the team's most successful era. She remained with the club until her retirement as a player in 1987. WBC Levski, the club established itself as the dominant force in Bulgarian women's basketball. Golcheva was part of teams that won six Bulgarian Women's Basketball League titles and nine Bulgarian Women's Basketball Cups, contributing to a prolonged period of domestic success. Her role within the team extended beyond scoring, as she was noted for her organizational play, decision-making, and leadership on the court.

Levski Sofia also achieved significant success in European competitions during Golcheva's tenure. She was a member of the Levski teams that won the Ronchetti Cup in 1978 and 1979, two of the earliest major European club trophies for Bulgarian women's basketball. The 1979 title was particularly notable, as it was decided in an all-Bulgarian final against WBC Maritsa Plovdiv, reflecting the high level of competition within the domestic league at the time.

Golcheva's most significant club success came in 1984, when Levski Sofia captured the EuroLeague Women. Under head coach Stanislav Boyadzhiev, Levski defeated the Italian side A.S. Vicenza in the final, securing the most prestigious club trophy in European women's basketball. Golcheva served as captain of the team during this period and was part of the core group of players whose experience and cohesion proved decisive in high-pressure matches.

Throughout her club career, Golcheva was known for her discipline, training commitment, and tactical understanding of the game. She regularly undertook additional individual training and was regarded as a player who combined technical skill with a strong sense of responsibility toward the team. By the time she retired from competitive play in 1987, she had established herself as one of the most accomplished players in the history of Bulgarian women's club basketball.

== National team career ==
Nadka Golcheva represented the Bulgarian national team from 1969 to 1983. Her first international appearances came at youth level, where she competed in a European championship in 1968, before progressing to the senior national team shortly thereafter.

Golcheva achieved her greatest international success at the Olympic Games. She won a bronze medal at the 1976 Summer Olympics in Montreal and a silver medal at the 1980 Summer Olympics in Moscow, marking the most successful Olympic period in the history of Bulgarian women's basketball.

At European level, Golcheva also played a key role in Bulgaria's medal-winning campaigns, earning silver medals at the 1972 and 1983 tournaments, as well as a bronze medal at EuroBasket 1976. In addition, she represented Bulgaria at two Summer Universiades, winning bronze in 1977 and finishing fourth in 1979.

Her international achievements can be summarized as follows:

- 1976 Summer Olympics
- 1980 Summer Olympics
- EuroBasket Women 1972
- EuroBasket Women 1976
- EuroBasket Women 1983
- 1977 Summer Universiade
- 4th place – 1979 Summer Universiade

=== Olympic Games statistics ===
Golcheva appeared in two Olympic tournaments for Bulgaria. Her individual contributions across both campaigns are summarized below:

Olympic Games statistics
Tournament	Games played	Points
1976 Summer Olympics (Montreal)	4	9
1980 Summer Olympics (Moscow)	6	33

=== Senior national team statistics ===
The following table summarizes Golcheva's senior international tournament statistics, as recorded by FIBA.

Bulgarian National Team Statistics
Year	Competition	Host	Games played	Points per game	Rebounds per game	Assists per game	Efficiency
1972	European Championship for Women	Bulgaria	2	3.0	0.0	0.0	3.0
1976	European Championship for Women	France	4	4.0	0.0	0.0	4.0
1976	Olympic Games – Women's Tournament	Canada	4	2.5	1.3	2.8	1.3
1976	Pre-Olympic Basketball Tournament for Women	Bulgaria	5	8.0	0.0	0.0	7.6
1978	European Championship for Women	Poland	8	9.8	0.0	0.0	9.4
1980	European Championship for Women	France	15	6.5	0.0	0.0	6.5
1980	Olympic Games – Women's Tournament	Soviet Union	6	5.5	2.8	1.5	6.5
1980	World Olympic Qualification Tournament for Women	Bulgaria	7	6.9	0.0	0.0	6.6
1983	European Championship for Women	Hungary	11	7.9	0.0	0.0	7.6
1984	World Olympic Qualification Tournament for Women	Cuba	4	5.3	0.0	0.0	5.0
1986	World Championship for Women	Soviet Union	4	4.3	0.0	0.0	3.3

== Legacy and recognition ==
Golcheva was awarded the honorary title „Заслужил майстор на спорта“ (Honoured Master of Sport).

Following her playing career, she remained actively involved in the sport. For more than a decade, she worked in the youth academy of Slavia Sofia, contributing to the development of younger players and continuing her involvement in Bulgarian basketball at grassroots level.
