= Nikolay Kolev =

Nikolay Kolev may refer to:

- Nikolay Kolev (discus thrower) (born 1968), Bulgarian discus thrower
- Nikolay Kolev (footballer) (born 1990), Bulgarian footballer
- Nikolay Kolev (journalist) (1932–2004), Bulgarian TV sports journalist
- Nikolay Kolev (rower, born 1950) (born 1950), Bulgarian Olympic rower
- Nikolay Kolev (rower, born 1973) (born 1973), Bulgarian Olympic rower
- Nikolay Kolev (weightlifter) (born 1978), Bulgarian weightlifter
