= Stoyan Bobekov =

Bulgarian cyclist

Personal information
- Born: 10 November 1953 (age 72) Plovdiv, Bulgaria

Cycling career
- Sport: Cycling

Stoyan Bobekov (Bulgarian: Стоян Бобеков, born 10 November 1953) is a Bulgarian former cyclist. He competed in the individual road race and team time trial events at the 1976 Summer Olympics.
