= Filip Stojanovski =

Macedonian association football player

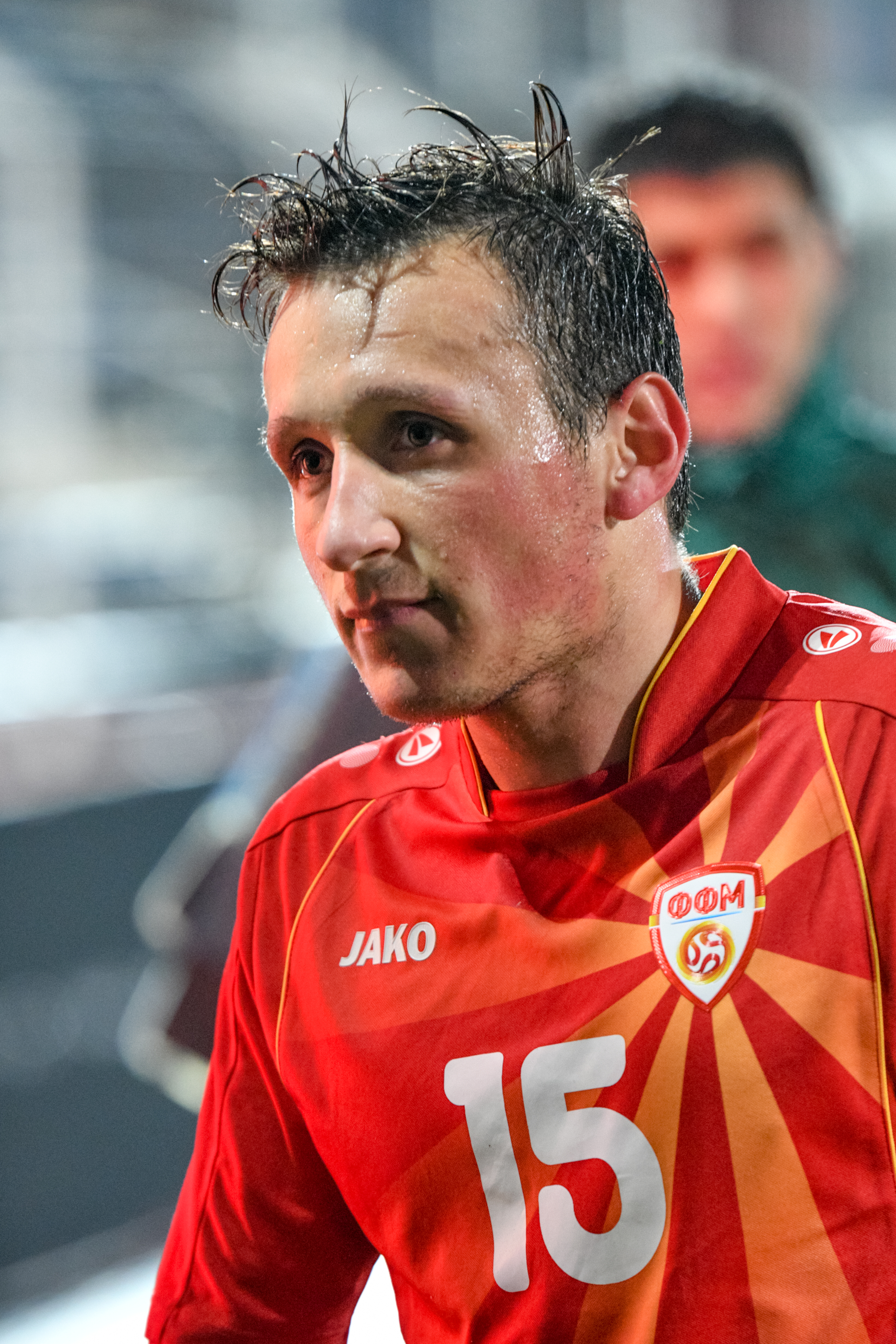
- Stojanovski in 2019

Personal information
- Date of birth: 1 December 1996 (age 29)
- Place of birth: Skopje, Macedonia
- Height: 1.75 m (5 ft 9 in)
- Position: Right-back

Youth career
- 2011–2014: Vardar

Senior career*
Years	Team	Apps	(Gls)
2014–2016	Vardar	7	(0)
2015–2016	→ Ljubanci (loan)		
2016–2017	Apolonia	10	(0)
2018	Radnički	11	(0)
2018–2019	Makedonija GP	17	(0)
2019–2020	Shkupi	13	(0)
2020–2020	Ferizaj	8	(0)
2020–2021	FK Pelister	3	(0)
2021–2023	FK Skopje	15	(1)

International career^{‡}
2014	Macedonia U19	2	(0)
2017–2018	Macedonia U21	3	(0)
- * Club domestic league appearances and goals as of 5 January 2020 ‡ National team caps and goals as of 22 May 2018

Filip Stojanovski (Macedonian: Филип Стојановски, born 1 December 1996) is a Macedonian footballer who plays as a right-back for FK Skopje in the Macedonian First League.

== Club career ==
Born in Macedonian capital of Skopje, Stojkovski played with youth team of FK Vardar. He made his debut as senior in the championship winning season of 2014–15. The following season he played on loan with FK Ljubanci 1974. In June 2016 he signed with FK Sileks, however, by August same year he moved to Albania and signed with KF Apolonia Fier playing with them in the 2016–17 Albanian First Division. During thee winter-breal of the 2017–18 season, he moved to Serbia and signed with FK Radnički Pirot playing the 2017–18 Serbian First League. At the end of the season 17–18, he returns to Macedonia and signs for FK Makedonija Gjorče Petrov from the First Macedonian League, where he recorded 17 appearances, due to good games, in the summer transfer period 2019, signing for FK Shkupi. After the good games for FK Shkupi, he transferred to Kosovo to the team KF Ferizaj

== International career ==
He played for Macedonia U-19 and U-21 national teams.

== Honours ==
Vardar

- Macedonian First League: 2014–15
