= Todorka Yordanova =

Bulgarian basketball player

Olympic medal record

Women's basketball

Representing Bulgaria
Bronze medal – third place	1976 Montreal	Team competition

Todorka Yordanova (Bulgarian: Тодорка Йорданова; born 3 January 1956) is a Bulgarian former basketball player who competed in the 1976 Summer Olympics.
