= Ivan Kolev =

Ivan Kolev may refer to:

- Ivan Kolev (general) (1863–1917), Bulgarian general during WWI
- Ivan Kolev (footballer, 1930–2005), Bulgarian football manager and former forward, and 1956 Olympic bronze medalist
- Ivan Kolev (wrestler) (born 1951), Bulgarian wrestler, 1976 Olympics bronze medalist
- Ivan Kolev (footballer, born 1957), Bulgarian football manager and former midfielder
- Ivan Kolev (footballer, born 1995), Bulgarian football forward for Dunav Ruse
