= Centre Étienne Desmarteau =

Sports complex in Montreal, Quebec

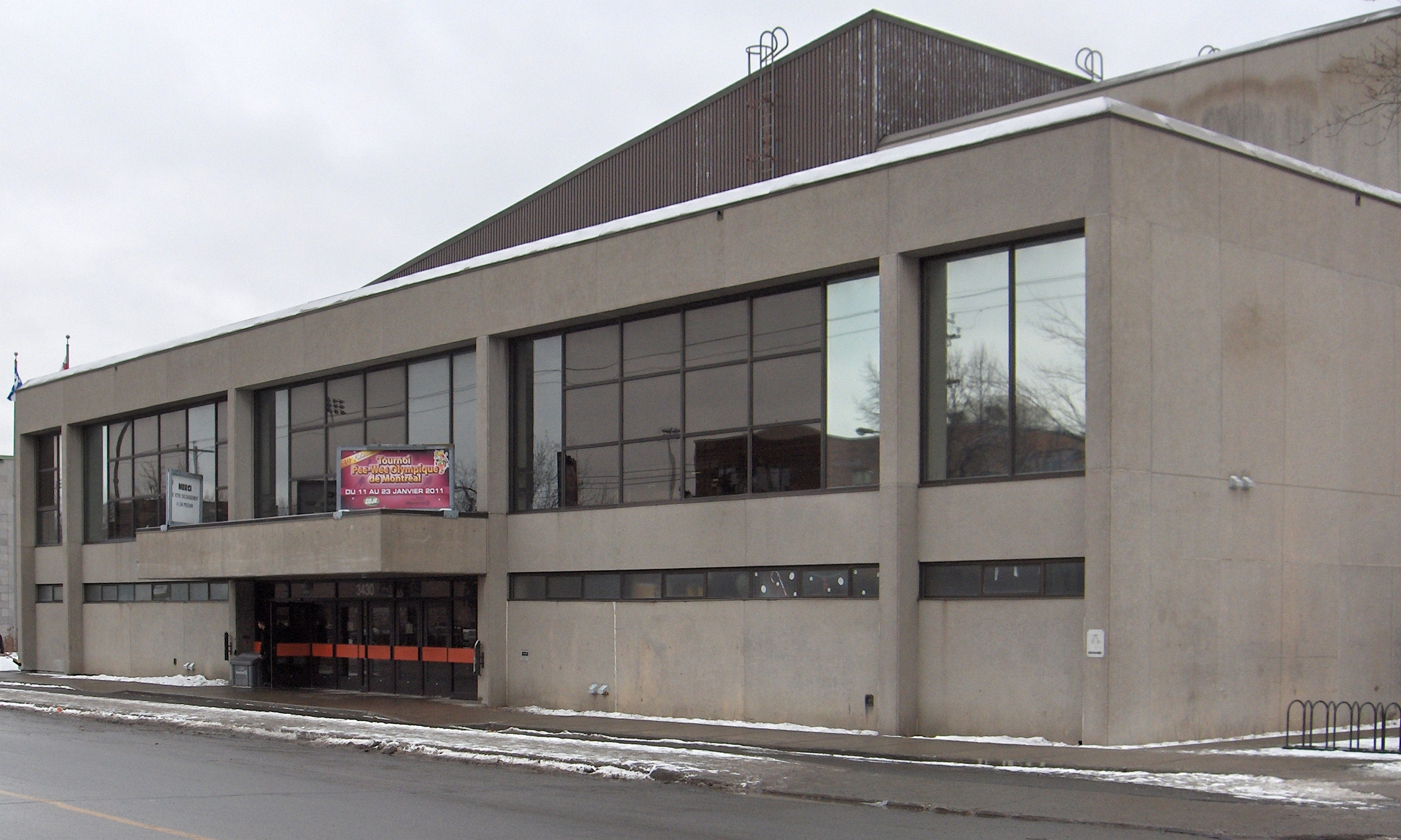
- Interactive map of Centre Étienne Desmarteau
- Address: 3430 Rue de Bellechasse
- Location: Montreal, Quebec, Canada
- Coordinates: 45°33′20″N 73°34′49″W
- Owner: City of Montreal
- Capacity: Hockey: 2,200 (Caroline Ouellette rink 1); 600 (Jean Trottier rink 2)
- Surface: Multi-surface

Construction
- Opened: 1976

Tenant
- Montreal Mission (NRL)

The Centre Étienne Desmarteau is a multi-purpose complex with two ice rinks in Montreal, Quebec, Canada.

== History ==
The centre is named in honour of Étienne Desmarteau, a Canadian Olympic athlete during the 1904 Summer Olympics. The arena hosted the basketball preliminaries during the 1976 Summer Olympics. Following the Olympics, it has been used mostly as an ice hockey venue, while the gyms are used for a variety of sports including indoor soccer, basketball and rhythmic gymnastics.

== Description ==
The first ice rink in the complex has 2,200 seats and is named after Caroline Ouellette. The second, smaller rink, the Ice rink Jean Trottier, has a 600-person seating capacity. There are also two Olympic gymnasiums, some changing rooms, and one weights room for training.

== Tenants ==
It was once home to Montreal Juniors hockey team and Les Canadiennes a women's ice hockey team in the Canadian Women's Hockey League. The Montreal Mission, a professional team in the National Ringette League, calls the arena home. Furthermore, numerous amateur tournaments are held in it every year. The upstairs gym contains the home of the Club Rythmik Quebec, a rhythmic gymnastics club offering training up to international level, as well as recreational, pre-competitive, and parent and child classes.

== Gallery ==
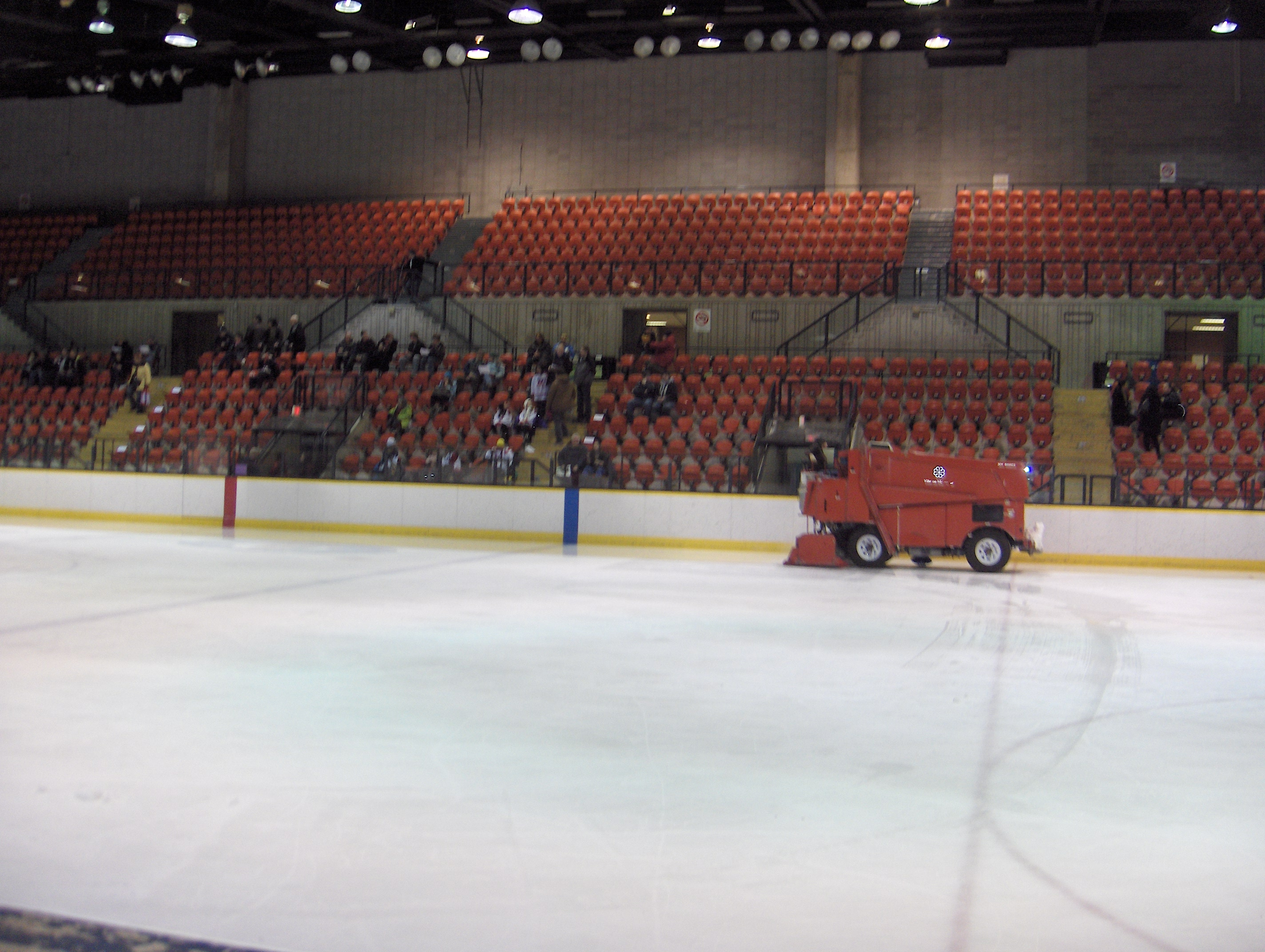
Ice Rink Caroline Ouellette

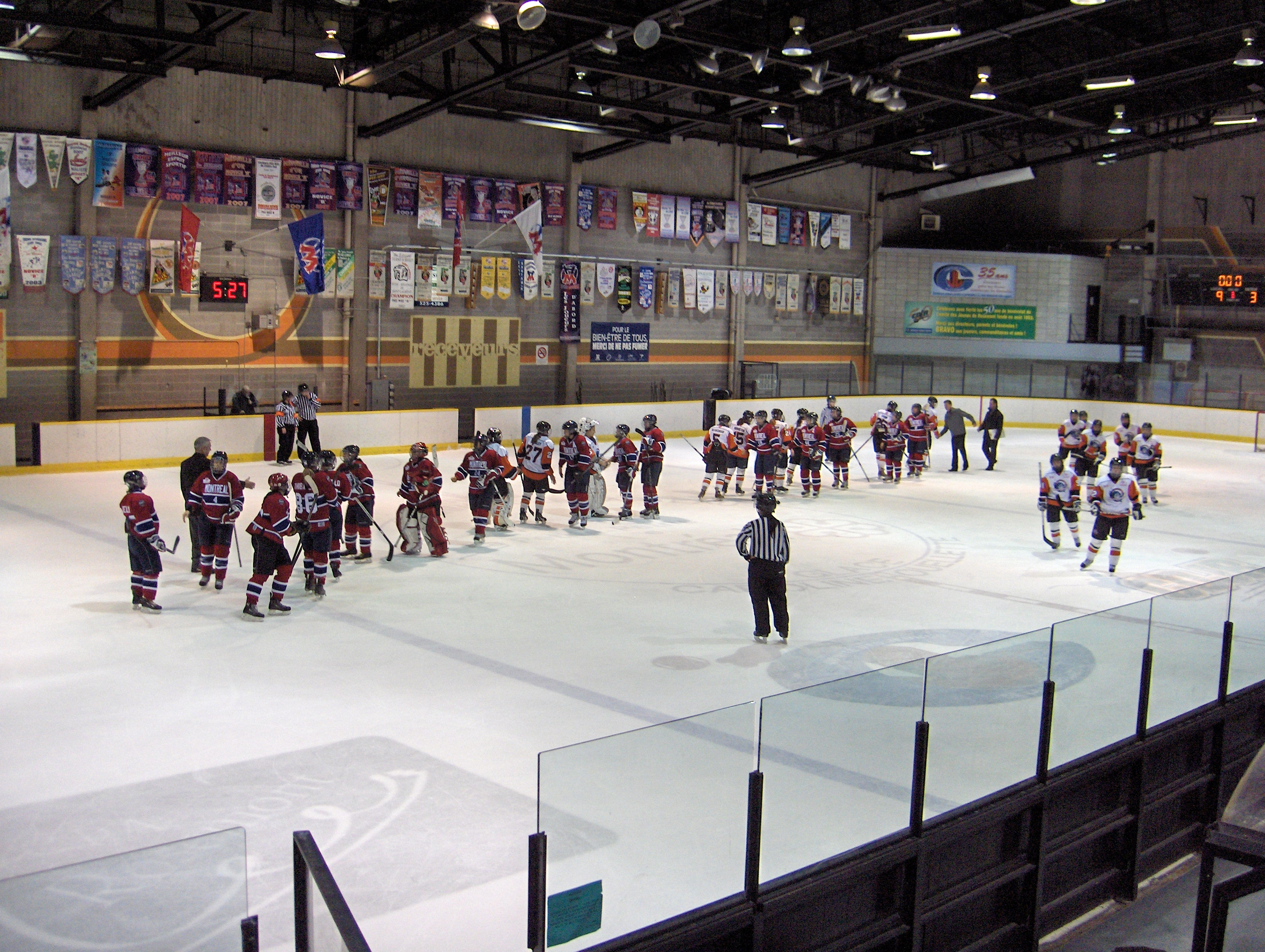
Ice Rink Caroline Ouellette

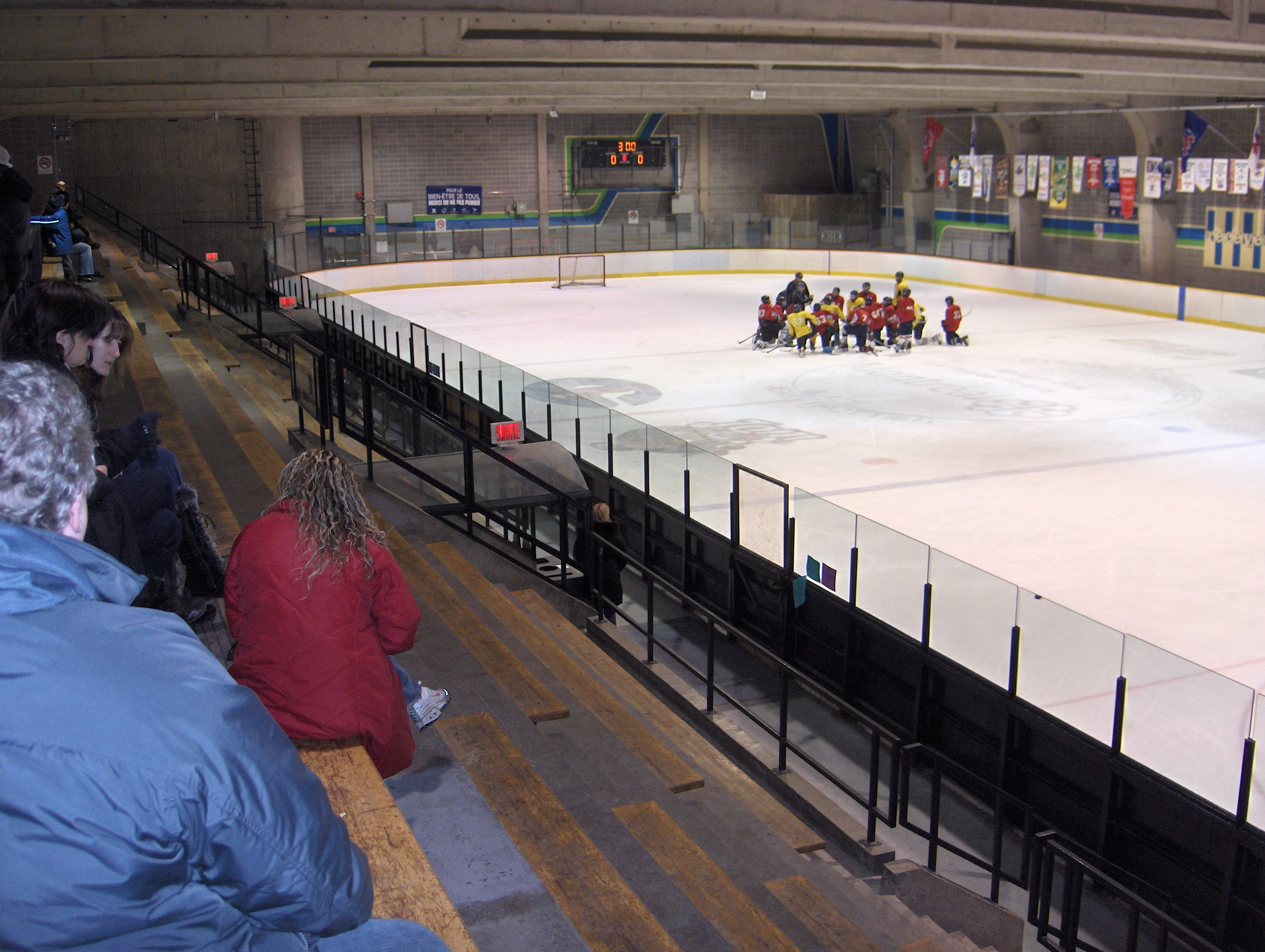
Ice Rink Jean Trottier
