= Stoian =

Stoian is a Romanian surname derived from the Bulgarian Stoyan. Notable people with the name include:

Surname:

- Adrian Stoian (born 1991), Romanian footballer
- Daniel Stoian (born 1967), Romanian sprint canoer
- Florin Stoian (born 1971), Romanian singer
- Ion Stoian (1927–2012), Romanian communist politician
- Monica Stoian (born 1982), Romanian javelin thrower
- Nicu Stoian (born 1957), Romanian volleyball player

== See also ==
- Stoyan
- Stojan
