= Nedyalko Stoyanov =

Bulgarian cyclist

Personal information
- Born: 26 January 1955 (age 71)

Cycling career
- Sport: Cycling

Nedyalko Stoyanov (Bulgarian: Недялко Стоянов, born 26 January 1955) is a Bulgarian former cyclist. He competed in the individual road race and team time trial events at the 1976 Summer Olympics.
