= Krasimira Gyurova =

Bulgarian basketball player (1953–2011)

Personal information
- Born: 26 October 1953 Sofia, Sofia-Grad, Bulgaria
- Died: 30 March 2011 (aged 57)
- Listed height: 164 cm (5 ft 5 in)
- Listed weight: 132 lb (60 kg)

Olympic medal record

Women's basketball

Representing Bulgaria
Bronze medal – third place	1976 Montreal	Team competition

Krasimira Gyurova (Bulgarian: Красимира Гюрова; 26 October 1953 – 30 March 2011) was a Bulgarian basketball player who competed in the 1976 Summer Olympics.
