= Petar Kolev =

Petar Kolev may refer to:

- Petar Kolev (footballer born 1974), Bulgarian retired football defender
- Petar Kolev (footballer born 1984), Bulgarian footballer for Master Burgas
