= Julia Stoyanovich =

American computer scientist

Julia Stoyanovich is an American computer scientist focusing on the ethics of artificial intelligence, responsible data science, and fairness in machine learning. Beyond computer science, she has also published research on the effects of the Russo-Ukrainian war on Ukrainian students. She is Institute Associate Professor and director of the Center for Responsible AI in the New York University Tandon School of Engineering.

== Education and career ==
Stoyanovich was a high school student at the Belgrade Mathematical Gymnasium. She graduated from the University of Massachusetts Amherst in 1998 with a double bachelor's degree in computer science and in mathematics and statistics, magna cum laude and Phi Kappa Phi. After working in industry as a computer programmer and database developer from 1997 to 2003, she continued her studies in computer science at Columbia University, where she received a master's degree in 2004 and completed her Ph.D. in 2009. Her doctoral dissertation, Search And Ranking In Semantically-rich Applications, was supervised by Kenneth A. Ross.

Next, she became a postdoctoral researcher and visiting scholar at the University of Pennsylvania, working with Susan B. Davidson. She joined Drexel University as an assistant professor in the College of Information Science and Technology (iSchool) in 2012, in the same year also working as a part-time assistant professor at the Skolkovo Institute of Science and Technology in Moscow, Russia. In 2013 she moved to Drexel's Department of Computer Science, and since 2018 she has been a faculty member in the Department of Computer Science & Engineering of the NYU Tandon School of Engineering. She was promoted to associate professor in 2021.

== Recognition ==
Stoyanovich was a 2025 recipient of the Presidential Early Career Award for Scientists and Engineers. City & State named her as one of their 2026 Above & Beyond: Women honorees.

== Personal life ==
Stoyanovich describes herself as being originally from both Moscow in Russia, and Belgrade, in Serbia, where she attended high school; her native language is Russian. She has a Russian husband, and has campaigned for improved Russian-language schooling in New York City for their son.
