= Petkana Makaveeva =

Bulgarian basketball player (born 1952)

Career highlights
- 11× Bulgarian Women's Basketball League champion; 9× Bulgarian Women's Basketball Cup winner
Medals
Representing Bulgaria
Olympic Games
Women's basketball
Silver medal – second place	1980 Moskva	Team competition
Bronze medal – third place	1976 Montreal	Team competition
EuroBasket Women
Bronze medal – third place	1976 France
Silver medal – second place	1983 Hungary

Petkana Makaveeva (Bulgarian: Петкана Макавеева; born 4 October 1952) is a Bulgarian former basketball player who competed in the 1976 Summer Olympics and in the 1980 Summer Olympics.

Makaveeva has two sons, Stefan Georgiev and Zlatin Georgiev, both of whom have been involved in basketball. Following the end of her playing career, she remained connected to the sport through coaching and youth development.

== Club career ==
=== Early club career ===
Makaveeva began her senior club career in Sofia, initially playing for BC CSKA Sofia. She joined the club as a teenager and quickly established herself as a regular member of the starting lineup, earning recognition for her scoring ability and composure under pressure. After one season with CSKA, she continued her development at VIF, where she worked under coach Veselin Temkov.

During her entire professional basketball career, Petkana Makaveeva played for several leading Bulgarian teams, most notably Levski Sofia and PBC Academic. Across her domestic career, she achieved sustained success, winning a total of nine Bulgarian league titles with Levski Sofia and two league titles with Academik Sofia.

While playing for Academik Sofia, she recorded one of the most notable individual performances in Bulgarian women’s basketball history, scoring 46 points in a single game against Maritsa Plovdiv. This achievement highlighted her scoring ability and further cemented her reputation as one of the dominant offensive players of her generation.
