= Mariya Stoyanova =

Bulgarian basketball player

Olympic medal record

Women's basketball

Representing Bulgaria
Bronze medal – third place	1976 Montreal	Team competition

Mariya Stoyanova (Bulgarian: Мария Стоянова; born 19 July 1947) is a Bulgarian former basketball player who competed in the 1976 Summer Olympics.
