= Stoyan Zlatev =

Bulgarian modern pentathlete

Personal information
- Born: 2 August 1954 (age 71)

Sport
- Sport: Modern pentathlon

Stoyan Zlatev (Bulgarian: Стоян Златев, born 2 August 1954) is a Bulgarian modern pentathlete. He competed at the 1976 Summer Olympics.
