= Stojanov =

Stojanov is a Bulgarian and Macedonian surname, often a corresponding to (Macedonian: Стојанов), with feminine form Stojanova (Macedonian: Стојанова). It may also be used for Bulgarian: Стоянов, Стоянова, which is otherwise transliterated as Stoyanov, Stoyanova. Notable people with the surname include:

- Alek Stojanov (born 1973), Canadian ice hockey player
- Bobby Stojanov Varga (born 1972), Macedonian painter
- Darko Stojanov (born 1990), Macedonian footballer
- Igor Stojanov (born 1976), Macedonian footballer
- Kiro Stojanov (born 1959), Macedonian Roman Catholic Bishop
- Nikolai Stojanov (1883–1968), Belarusian-Bulgarian botanist
- Panče Stojanov (born 1976), Macedonian footballer
- Uroš Stojanov (born 1989), Serbian footballer
- Vančo Stojanov (born 1977), Macedonian middle-distance runner

== See also ==
- Stoyanov
