= Stoyko Kolev =

Bulgarian footballer

Personal information
- Full name: Stoyko Zlatkov Kolev
- Date of birth: 11 April 1986 (age 40)
- Place of birth: Yambol, Bulgaria
- Height: 1.72 m (5 ft 8 in)
- Position: Midfielder

Team information
- Current team: Karnobat

Youth career
- Naftex Burgas

Senior career*
Years	Team	Apps	(Gls)
2004–2006	Naftex Burgas	14	(0)
2007–2008	Sliven 2000	27	(0)
2008–2010	Minyor Radnevo	45	(4)
2010	Chernomorets Balchik	7	(0)
2011–2013	Tundzha Yambol	?	(8)
2013–2015	Nesebar	?	(4)
2015–	Karnobat	27	(5)
- * Club domestic league appearances and goals as of 21 April 2016

Stoyko Kolev (Bulgarian: Стойко Колев) (born on 11 April 1986) is a Bulgarian footballer currently playing for FC Karnobat as a midfielder.

== Career ==
Kolev started his career in Naftex Burgas and played for the club in the A PFG. In January 2007 signed with Sliven 2000 for a free transfer.
