= Krasimir Stoykov =

Bulgarian swimmer

Personal information
- Born: 15 January 1955 (age 71)

Sport
- Sport: Swimming

Krasimir Stoykov (Bulgarian: Красимир Стойков; born 15 January 1955) is a Bulgarian former swimmer. He competed in two events at the 1976 Summer Olympics.
