= Nikolay Stoyanov =

Bulgarian botanist (1883–1968)

Nikolai Stojanov
- Born: 9 November 1883 (old style); Grodno, now in Belarus
- Died: 9 October 1968 (aged 84); Sofia, Bulgaria
- Scientific career
- Fields: botany

Nikolai Andreev Stojanov (Bulgarian: Николай Андреев Стоянов; 21 November 1883 – 9 October 1968) was an academic and botanist who was among the founders of botany in Bulgaria.

He was for many years professor at Sofia University, the founder and first director of the Institute of Botany of the Bulgarian Academy of Sciences (BAS) (succeeded in July 2010 by the Institute of Biodiversity and Ecosystem Research).

== Biography ==
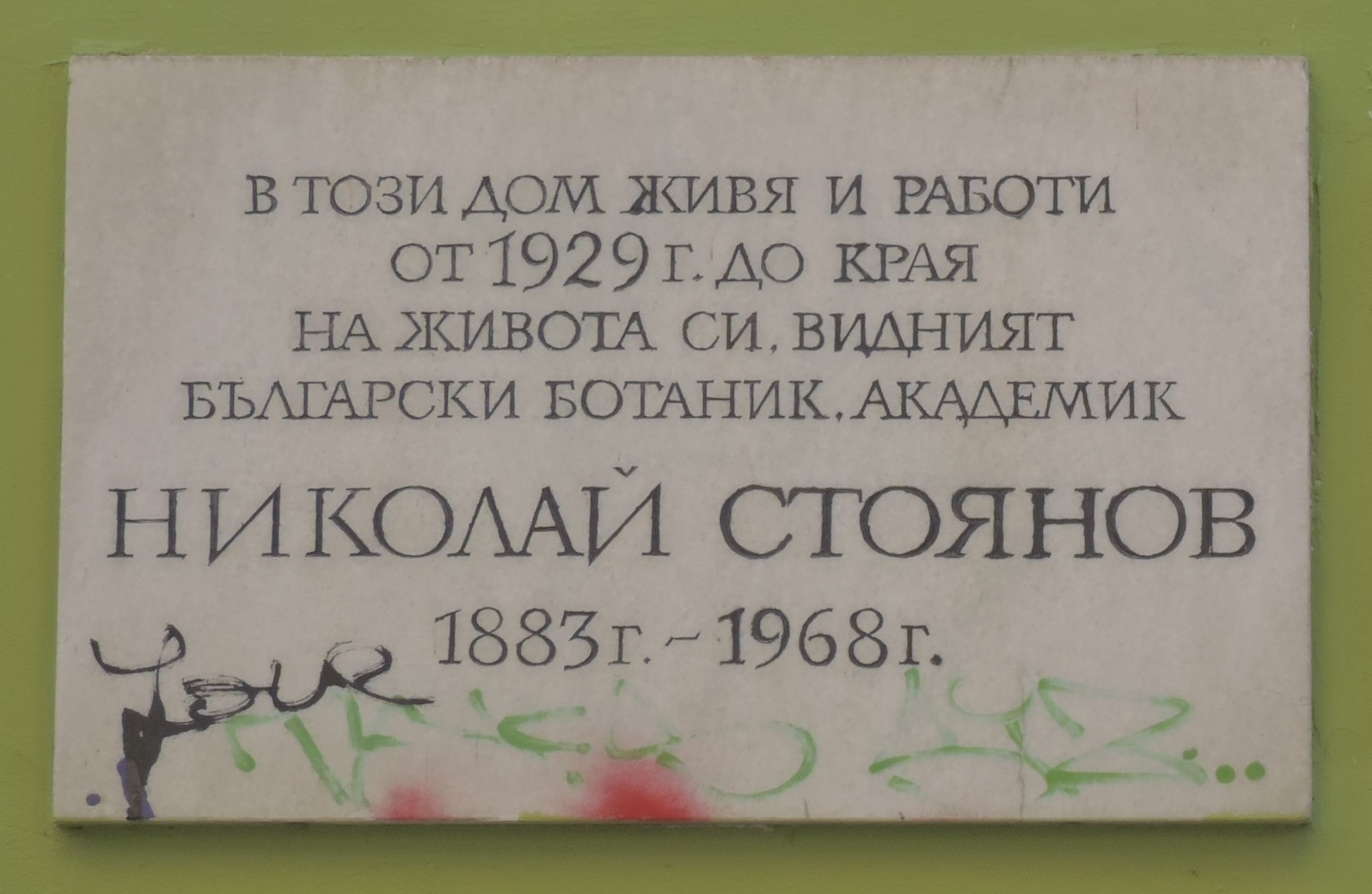
Memorial plaque for Acad. Nikolai Stojanov on the facade of his house in Sofia

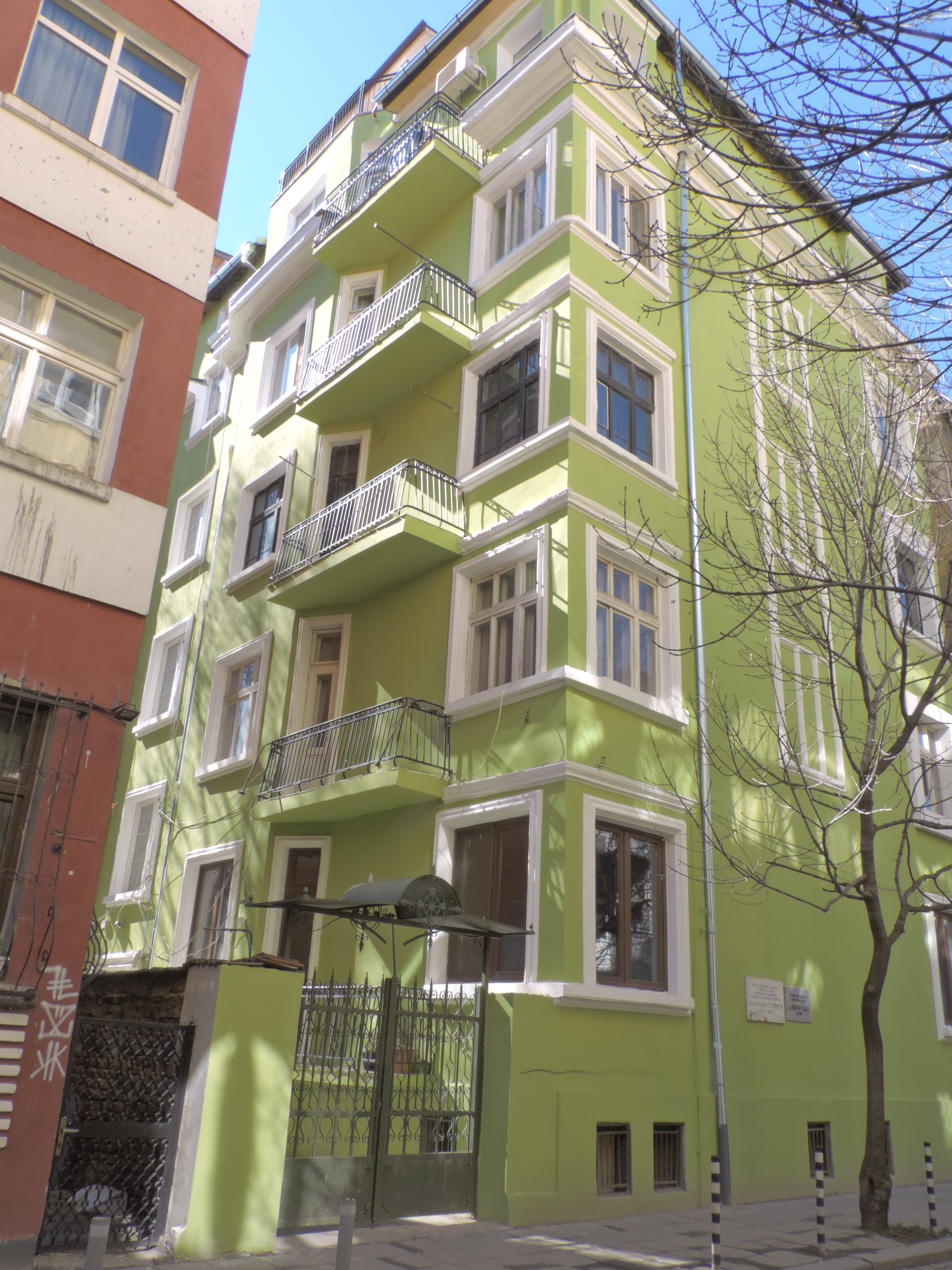
The house of Acad. Nikolai Stojanov, "William Gladstone" Str., Sofia

Nikolai Stojanov was born in Grodno, Russia (now in Belarus) on 21 November [O.S. 9 November] 1883. In 1903 he was admitted to study at the Agronomy Department of the Kiev Polytechnic University, but in 1906 was interned for revolutionary activities. He fled to Bulgaria in 1909, where he graduated in 1911 in the Biological sciences at Sofia University.

He then studied botany in Germany (1911–1912, 1924–1925), Austria and the UK (1924–1925).

Between 1913 and 1951 he was a member of the faculty at Sofia University. From 1926 to 1930 was an extraordinary professor, and from 1930 full Professor. He was head of the department of Agricultural Botany within the Agronomy and Forestry Faculty between 1930 and 1936 and held the post of Dean 1931–1932. From 1936 to 1951 he was Professor and Head of Department of Plant Systematics and Plant Geography in the Physics and Mathematics Department of Sofia University.

In 1923 Nikolai Stojanov became a founder member of the Bulgarian Botanical Society. In 1947, he became the founder and first director (until 1962) of the Institute of Botany of the Botanical Garden of the Bulgarian Academy of Sciences. At the same time from 1951 to 1956 he was the Secretary of the Biology and Medical Science Department of the BAS. Between 1956 and 1959 he served as chief scientific secretary of the BAS.

He was a member of the Bulgarian Communist Party from 1946. He died in Sofia 9 October 1968.

== Contributions to science ==
Stojanov's research and teaching interests were associated with the classification of higher plants and plant geography, particularly in the Balkans and Bulgaria. He was author of 190 scientific papers published in Bulgaria and abroad, as well as numerous books, such as земеделска ботаника (Agricultural Botany) (1932) and растителна география (Plant Geography) (1951).

Together with Boris Stefanoff he produced the "Flora of Bulgaria" (first issued in 1925 and repeatedly amended and republished), which lists 2,936 species of fern, gymnosperms and angiosperms. He found more than 400 plant taxa new to science, and established the beginning of research in geobotany and paleobotany in Bulgaria . He investigated contemporary and historical plant geography of the Balkans and wrote papers on the vegetation of Pirin, Slavyanka, the Sofia Plain and the Danube islands.

He wrote on the original phytoclimatic zoning of Bulgaria and the acclimatization of plants. He also worked on floristics, the morphology of plants and plant ecology. He was author of numerous scientific and popular articles and was Bulgarian regional adviser for Flora Europaea.

With Boris Pavlov Kitanov he started the well-known exsiccata Plantae Bulgaricae exsiccatae in 1955.

For his scientific achievements he was awarded the "Georgi Dimitrov" medal in 1950

== Major works ==
- Stojanov, N. Stefanoff, B. Флора на България (Flora of Bulgaria) (in two volumes, four editions: 1924–1926, 1933, 1948 and 1965–1966, the latest edition along with B. Kitanov)
- Stoyanov, N. Опит за характеристика на главните фитоценози в България (An attempt to characterise the main plant communities in Bulgaria), Год. на СУ, ФМФ, vol. 3, 1941
- Stoyanov, N. Kitanov B. Диви полезни растения в България (Useful wild plants in Bulgaria), Sofia, 1960.
