= Penka Stoyanova =

Bulgarian basketball player (1950–2019)

Personal information
- Born: 21 January 1950 Karlovo, Bulgaria
- Died: 16 August 2019 (aged 69) Plovdiv, Bulgaria
- Listed height: 1.82 m (6 ft 0 in)
- Listed weight: 63 kg (139 lb)

Career information
- Playing career: 1967–1983
- Position: center
- Number: 15

Career history
- 1970–1981: WBC Maritsa Plovdiv
- 1981–1983: Virtus Roma

Career highlights
- 3× Bulgarian Women's Basketball League champion (1971, 1973, 1974); 8× Bulgarian Women's Basketball Cup champion (1974, 1976, 1977, 1980, 1983, 1985–1987)
- FIBA Hall of Fame

Penka Stoyanova (Bulgarian: Пенка Стоянова; 21 January 1950 – 16 August 2019) was a Bulgarian basketball player who competed in the 1976 Summer Olympics and in the 1980 Summer Olympics.

Penka Stoyanova was born in Karlovo on January 21, 1950. She studied at the sports school in Plovdiv. In 1966 she was included in the national anthology for girls, and in January 1967, at the age of 17, she entered the national women's team.She is a medalist with the national team: silver - from the Olympic Games in Moscow, USSR, 1980, and bronze - from the Olympic Games in Montreal, Canada in 1976.

Stoyanova participated in a total of 8 European basketball championships. She won a silver medal at the tournament in Varna, Bulgaria, in 1972 and a bronze medal in Clermont Ferrand in 1976. She has eight first places for 12 Balkan Games and two third places at a youth festival and Universiade. In addition to, she also achieved took 2nd place at the First World Basketball Festival [2] in Lima, Peru, in 1973 and the world games of the tournament "R. W. Jones" (William Jones Cup) in Taipei, Taiwan, in 1983 with the second team of Italy.

Penka Stoyanova is a three-time champion of Bulgaria with "Maritsa" (Plovdiv) with coach Tencho Nachev in 1971, 1973, and 1974 and four times, silver and bronze medalist in the Bulgarian basketball championship. With her home club, she is also a two-time finalist for the Lilyana Ronketti Cup - in 1979 and 1980.

For the Bulgarian national team, Stoyanova played in total 580 matches. She was the captain of all national teams, and from 1974 to 1981, she was the captain of the representation of the women's national team, which competed for the first time at the World Cup in Prague, Czechoslovakia, in 1967.

Stoyanova is the first Bulgarian basketball player to play professional basketball abroad. From 1981 to 1983, she was a player of the Italian "Roma." It is included in the symbolic fives in Europe from the Corriere Dello Sport newspaper. In 1969 he was personally awarded by the President of Italy at the big international tournament in Avellino. She has been elected twice for athlete No. 1 of the year in Plovdiv. In 1985, in her honor, a benefit match was organized for the first time [3] between the national team of Bulgaria and a national team in Europe.

She was declared an honorary citizen in the city of Karlovo in 1985 and the town of Plovdiv in 2000. She was among the torchbearers of the Olympic flame for the game in Athens, Greece, in 2004. She was included in the FIBA list in 2007 (International Basketball Federation [4]) of 35 players who contributed to the creation of world basketball in the 1950s.

After a long illness, she died at the age of 69 on August 16, 2019.
