= Ivan Stojmenović =

Ivan Stojmenović (1957 – 3 November 2014) was a Serbian-Canadian mathematician and computer scientist well known for his contributions to communications networks and algorithms. He has published over 300 articles in his field and edited four handbooks in the area of wireless sensor networks.

== Biography ==
He studied mathematics, earning a B.Sc. (1979) and M.Sc. at the University of Novi Sad, and a Ph.D. (1985) at the University of Zagreb, where he continued as assistant professor (1985–87). He held the chair in Applied Computing in the School of Engineering at the University of Birmingham in the UK 2007/8. After visiting appointments at Washington State University and University of Miami he joined the faculty at University of Ottawa (1988) where he was a professor.

He was also editor-in-chief of IEEE Transactions on Parallel and Distributed Systems.

== Books ==
- Wireless Sensor and Actuator Networks: Algorithms and Protocols for Scalable Coordination and Data Communication (Wiley, 2010).
- Handbook of Applied Algorithms: Solving Scientific, Engineering and Practical Problems (Wiley, 2008).
- Handbook of Sensor Networks: Algorithms and Architectures (Wiley, 2005). Bundled with Crossbow Technology sensorkits.
- Mobile Ad Hoc Networking (Wiley, 2004).
- Handbook of Wireless Networks and Mobile Computing (Wiley, 2002)

== Awards and honors ==
In 2008 he was named an IEEE Fellow "for contributions to data communication algorithms and protocols for wireless sensor and ad hoc networks".

== Death in car accident ==
Stojmenović died on 3 November 2014 after he lost control of his car and slammed into an overpass on Highway 416.
