= Obrovac, Serbia =

Obrovac Обровац (Serbian)
- Village (Selo)
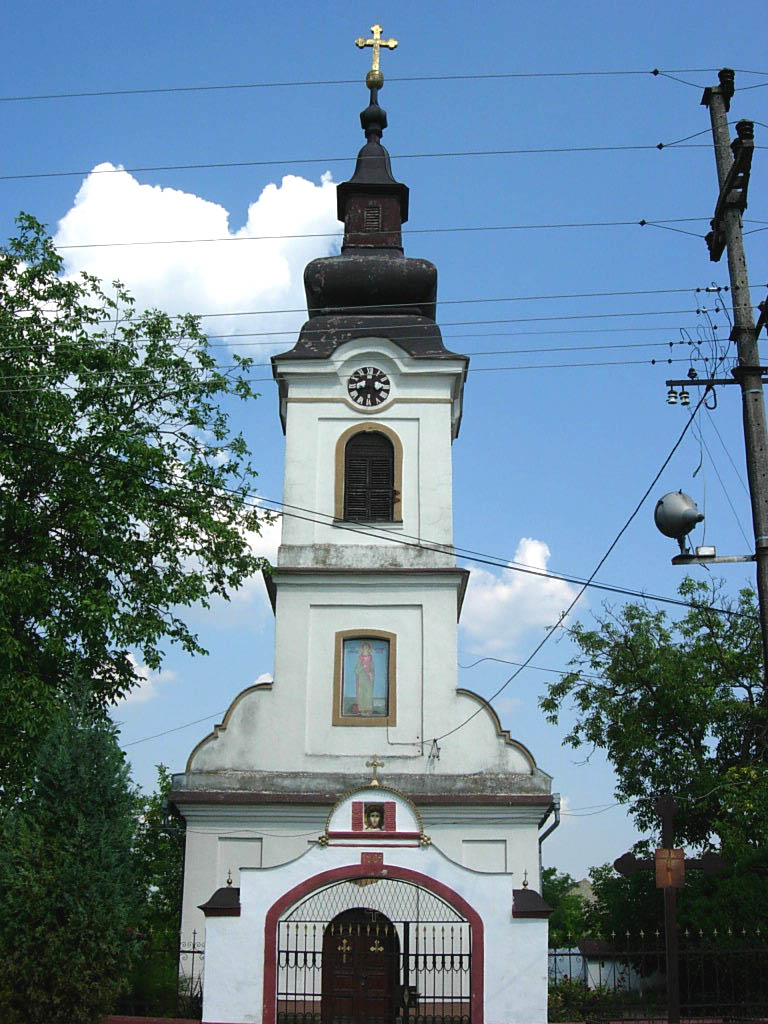
- The Orthodox Church

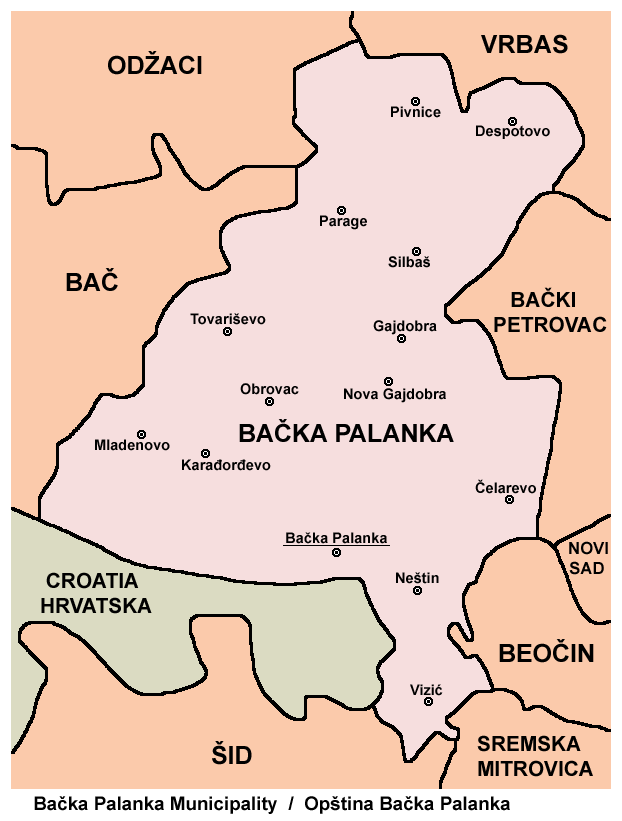
- Map of the Bačka Palanka municipality, showing the location of Obrovac

- Location within Vojvodina Location within Serbia Location within Europe
- Coordinates: 45°19′N 19°21′E
- Country: Serbia
- Province: Vojvodina
- Region: Bačka (Podunavlje)
- District: South Bačka
- Municipality: Bačka Palanka

Population (2002)
  - Total: 3,177
- Time zone: UTC+1 (CET)
  - Summer (DST): UTC+2 (CEST)

Obrovac (Serbian Cyrillic: Обровац) is a village located in the Bačka Palanka municipality, in the South Bačka District of Serbia. It is situated in the Autonomous Province of Vojvodina. The village has a Serb ethnic majority and its population numbering 3,177 people (2002 census).

== Name ==
Name Obrovac is of Serbian origin (there is a town in Croatian Dalmatia with same name, see: Obrovac, Croatia). Germans and Hungarians also used modified versions of this Serbian name: Obrowatz (in German) or Boróc, previously Obrovácz (in Hungarian).

== History ==
Serbs established it in 1308. It was destroyed by Ottomans in 1526, after The Battle of Mohács. Growth of the village starts at the end of the 16th century. During the Ottoman rule (16th-17th century), Obrovac was mostly populated by ethnic Serbs.

In 1698, people who left Metković (now Nova Gajdobra) settled in Obrovac. In 1757, Orthodox church and school were built. In 1786, 138 Serb families lived in the village. At the same time, many German people came here from Bavaria (after 1768). In 1825, Catholic church and school for German children were built. In 1904, 1,985 Germans and 1,072 Serbs lived in Obrovac. Today, village has many cultural and sports manifestations.

== Historical population ==
- 1880: 2,730
- 1910: 2,930
- 1921: 3,039
- 1961: 3,512
- 1971: 3,174
- 1981: 3,245
- 1991: 3,242
- 2002: 3,177

== Gallery ==
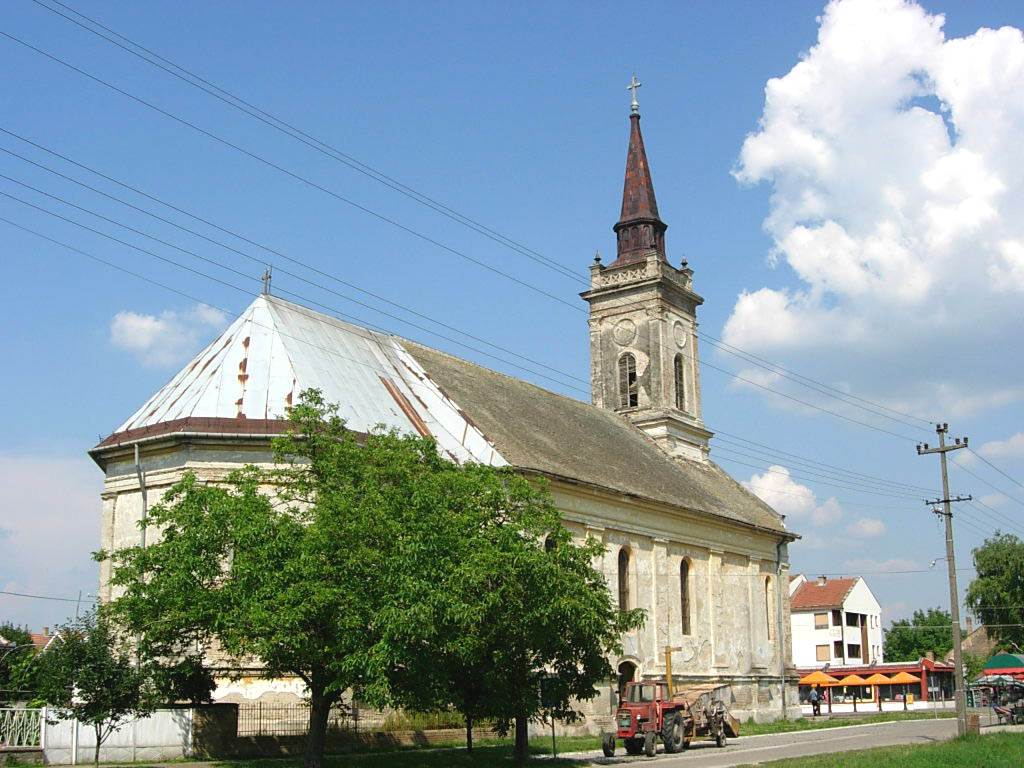
The Saint Ferdinand the Bishop Catholic Church in Obrovac.

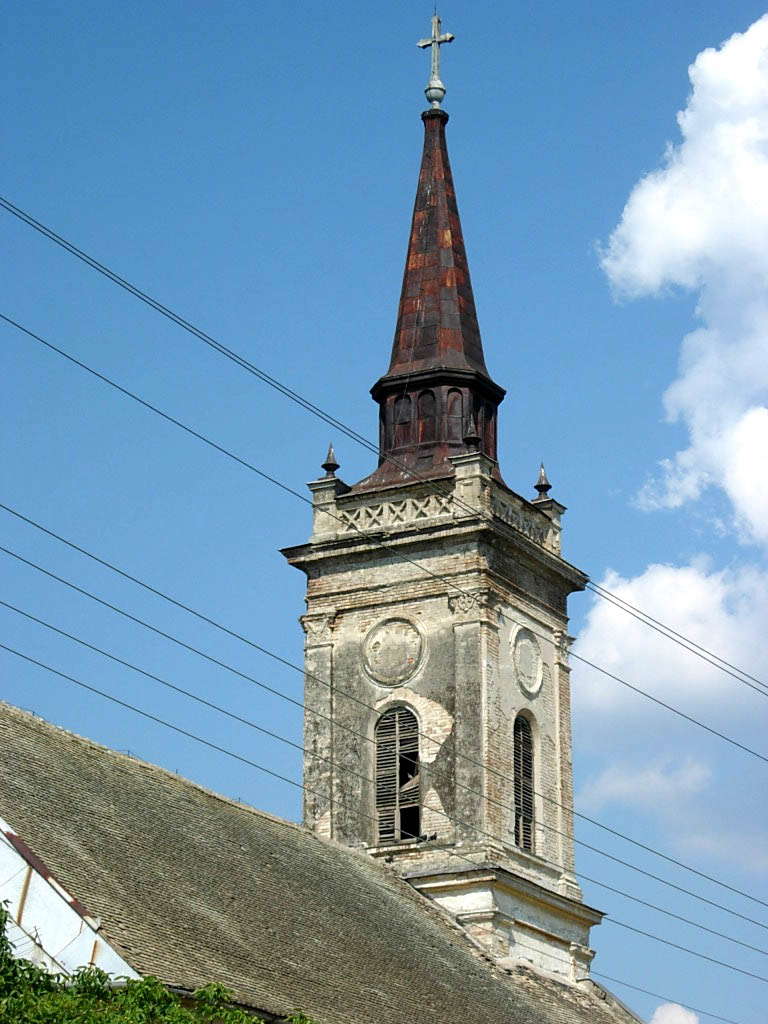
The steeple of the Catholic Church.

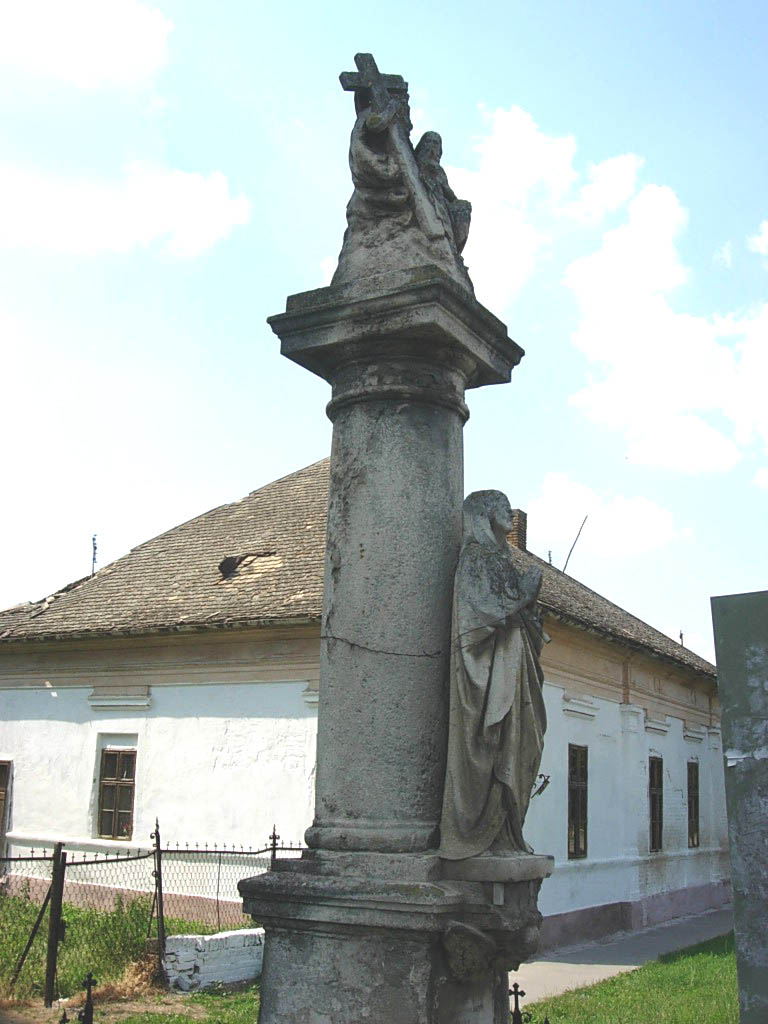
Sculpture in front of the Catholic Church.

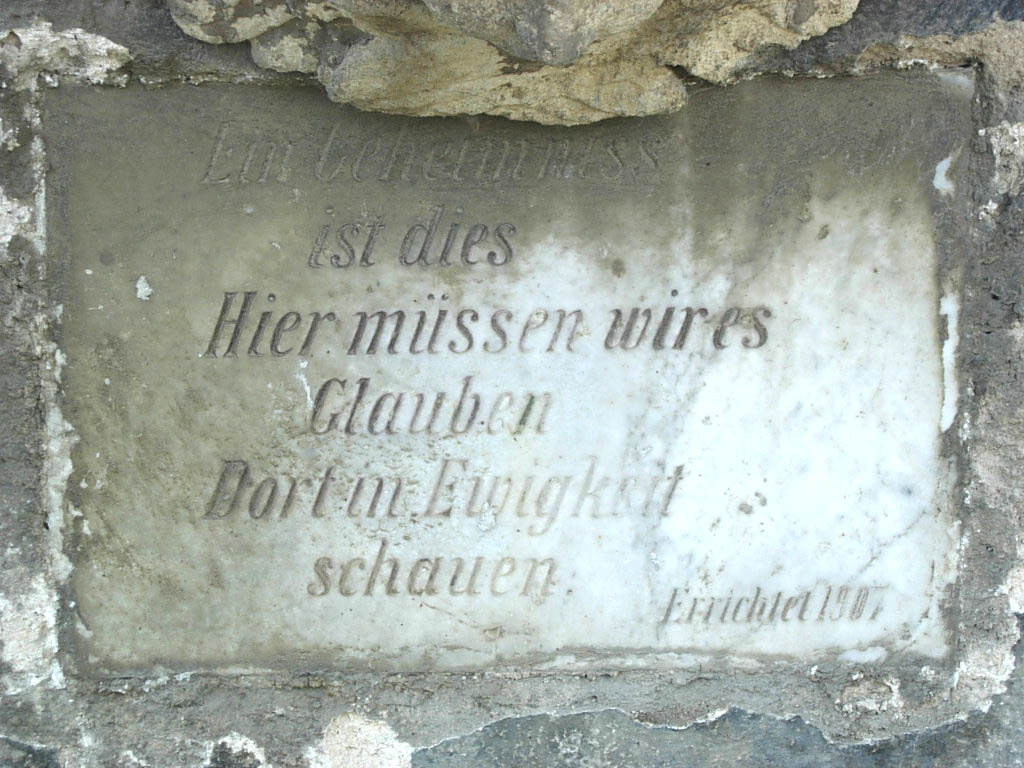
Inscription on the bottom of the sculpture.

== See also ==
- Bačka Palanka
- South Bačka District
- Bačka
- List of cities, towns and villages in Vojvodina
