= Church of St. John the Baptist, Bačka Palanka =

Church of St. John the Baptist
- Црква светог Јована Крститеља
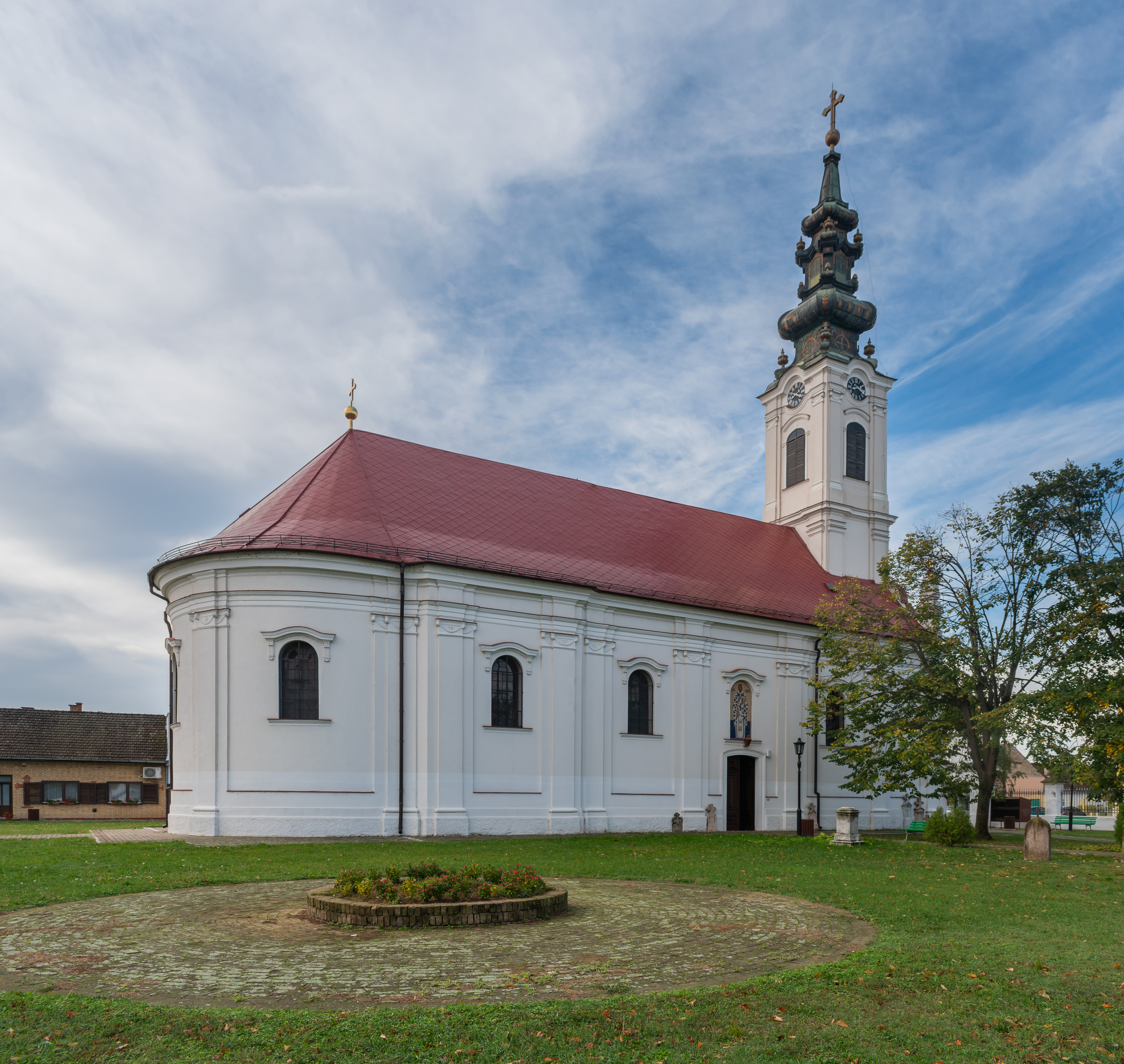
- Church of St. John the Baptist
- Church of St. John the Baptist
- 45°14′57″N 19°23′50″E
- Location: Bačka Palanka, Vojvodina

Cultural Heritage of Serbia
- Type: Cultural Monument of Great Importance
- Designated: 1995
- Reference no.: СК 1127
- Country: Serbia
- Denomination: Serbian Orthodox

History
- Status: Church
- Dedication: John the Baptist

Architecture
- Functional status: Active
- Style: Neo-classicism
- Years built: 1783-1787

Administration
- Archdiocese: Eparchy of Bačka

The Church of St. John the Baptist in Bačka Palanka, dedicated to the Nativity of St. John the Baptist, was constructed between 1783 and 1787. Built in the late baroque style by architects Josif Cigler and Ernest Harle, the church features a single nave with a semi-circular apse, a rectangular choir wider than usual for the region, and a tall baroque bell tower. The church has entrances on the west, north, and south facades.

The interior includes iconostasis crafted by Georgije Dević, a woodcarver from Bačka Palanka, who also created the woodcarvings on the candle stands and in the choir area. The iconostasis was painted in 1811 by Grigorije Jezdimirović, a late baroque artist inclined towards classical monumental religious compositions.

The church underwent extensive interior restoration in 1961 under the supervision of the Provincial Institute for the Protection of Cultural Monuments from Novi Sad, during the tenure of bishop Nikanor Iličić. From 2013 to 2015, the exterior was renovated, followed by interior restoration in 2016.

== See also ==
- Eparchy of Bačka
- Church of the Nativity of the Blessed Virgin Mary, Bačka Palanka
