= Nova Gajdobra =

Nova Gajdobra Нова Гајдобра (Serbian)
- Village (Selo)
- Location within Vojvodina Location within Serbia Location within Europe
- Coordinates: 45°20′N 19°26′E
- Country: Serbia
- Province: Vojvodina
- Region: Bačka (Podunavlje)
- District: South Bačka
- Municipality: Bačka Palanka

Population (2022)
  - Total: ▼1,016
- Time zone: UTC+1 (CET)
  - Summer (DST): UTC+2 (CEST)

Nova Gajdobra (Serbian Cyrillic: Нова Гајдобра) is a village located in the Bačka Palanka municipality, in the South Bačka District of Serbia. It is situated in the Autonomous Province of Vojvodina at 45.20° North, 19.27° East. The population of the village numbering 1016 people (2022 census), of whom most are ethnic Serbs.

== History ==
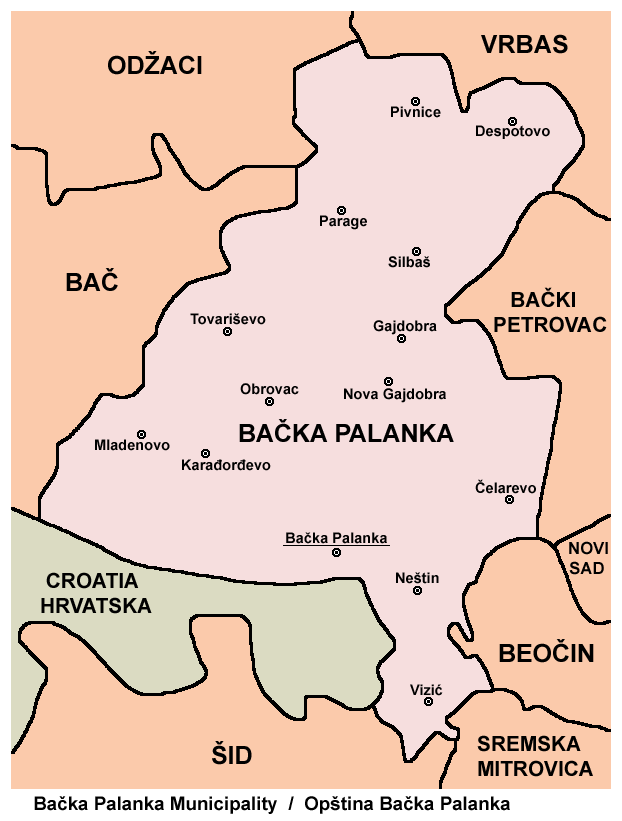
Map of the Bačka Palanka municipality, showing the location of Nova Gajdobra

In 1327 village Kereky (Serbian: Kerekić or Керекић) was established between Palanka and Gajdobra. The next time village was mentioned was in 1512. During the Ottoman rule (16th–17th century), two villages existed at this location: Kerekić (Керекић) and Metković (Метковић). Both villages were populated by ethnic Serbs. Hungarians called them Metkovics and Kerekity, which were modified versions of the Serbian names.

In 1650, Kerekić was uninhabited, but 38 years later Serbs again settled there. Today Kerekić is a name of the farm near Nova Gajdobra. In the 19th century Germans rebuilt it and lived here together with Serbs and Hungarians. It was a part of Habsburg Empire until 1918, when it became part of the Kingdom of Serbs, Croats and Slovenes. In 1922, it officially changed its name to Nova Gajdobra.

Today, people of Nova Gajdobra work in agriculture. Kids go to Primary school Aleksa Šantić, named by famous Serb poet. There are many cultural manifestations in Nova Gajdobra.

== Historical population ==
1331	1372	1409	1220	1016
1981	1991	2002	2011	2022

- 1961: 1623
- 1971: 1433
- 1981: 1331
- 1991: 1372
- 2002: 1409
- 2011: 1220
- 2022: 1016

== See also ==
- Bačka Palanka
- South Bačka District
- Bačka
- List of places in Serbia
- List of cities, towns and villages in Vojvodina
