= Fructal =

Slovenian beverage company

- Industry: Beverages and Snack Bars
- Predecessor: Pokrajinsko podjetje za izvoz in predelavo sadja Provincial Fruit Export and Processing Company
- Founded: 5 October 1945
- Founder: Mirko Lampe
- Key people: CEO: Goran Medić
- Products: Frutek, Frutabela, Fruc, Ledeni čaj, Slovenian vodka
- Owner: Nectar d.o.o. (95%)

Fructal is a Slovenian company manufacturing juices and candy bars. It was established on 5 October 1945. In the early 1970s, it was the largest fruit juice manufacturer in Yugoslavia. Since 2012, it has been almost in entirety owned by the Serbian Nectar company. It manufactures a number of brands (e.g., Frutabela fruit-cereal snack bars, Frutek fruit puree, Fruc juice, Ledeni Čaj iced tea, Slovenia Vodka, etc.). In early 2010s, Fructal generated 30% of its revenue from exports, mostly to Italy. Fructal's products are widely regarded as high quality.
