= Nectar d.o.o. =

Serbian beverage company

Coordinates: 45°15′00″N 19°25′39″E

Nectar
- Official logo
- Native name: Нектар
- Company type: d.o.o.
- Industry: beverages
- Founded: 19 January 1998; 28 years ago
- Headquarters: Novosadski put 9, Bačka Palanka, Serbia
- Area served: Worldwide
- Key people: Mihailo Janković (Director)
- Revenue: ▼€55.68 million (2018)
- Net income: ▼€3.85 million (2018)
- Total assets: ▲€124.34 million (2018)
- Total equity: ▲€62.48 million (2018)
- Owner: Radun Inženjering d.o.o. (81.11%); Smilja Radun (18.89%)
- Number of employees: 576 (2018)
- Website: www.nectar.rs

Nectar or Nectar Group is a Serbian beverage company. It is headquartered in Bačka Palanka, Serbia.

== History ==
The company was founded on 19 January 1999, as a Radun family company.

On 25 July 2011, Nectar bought 93,73 shares of the Slovenian beverage company Fructal for 50 million euros. Later in 2011, on October 31, Nectar bought Vladičin Han-based company Delišes for 300,000 euros.
