= Jelena Bodražić =

Serbian singer (born 1971)

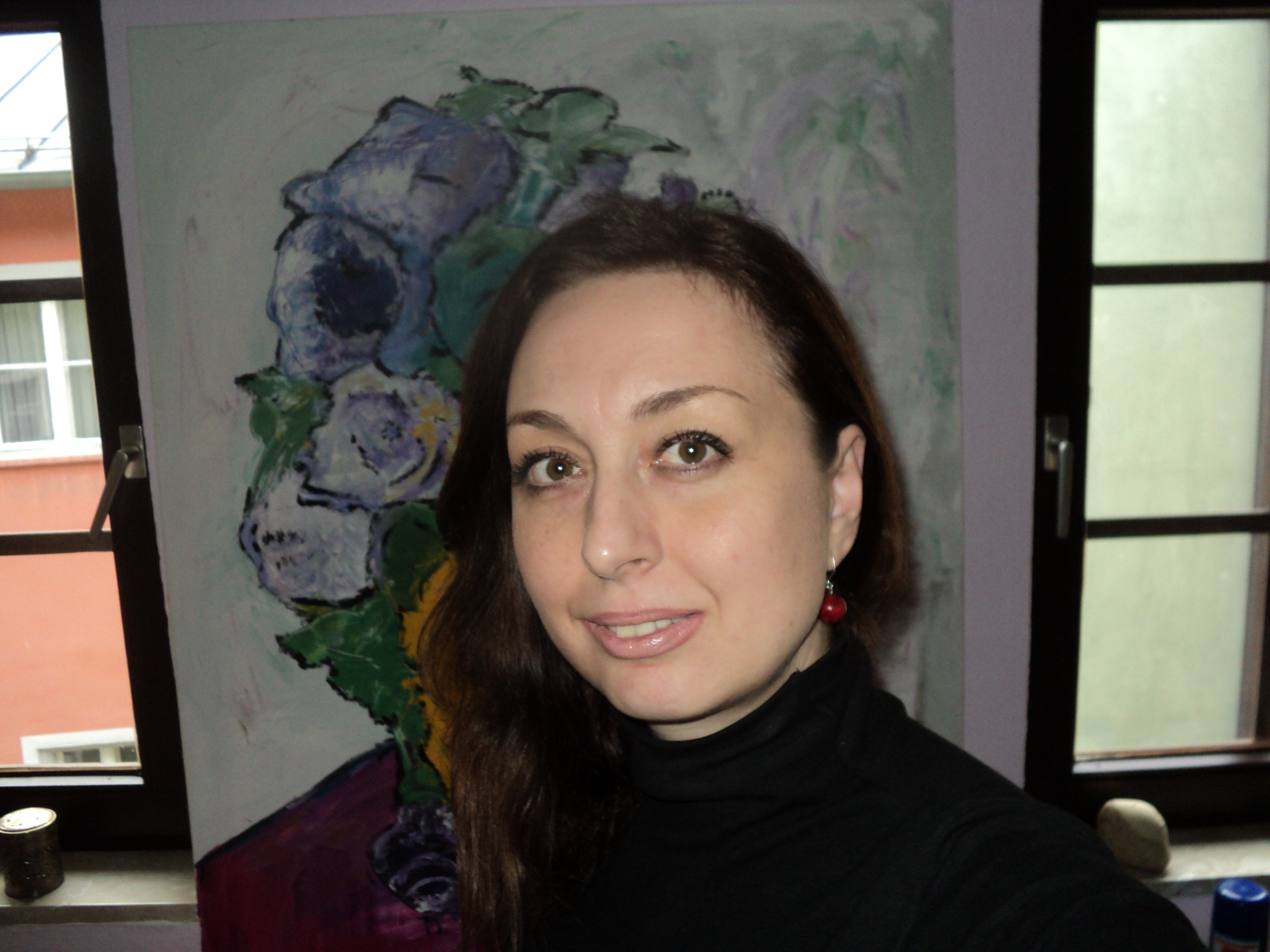
Jelena Bodražić

Jelena Bodražić (born 1971) is a mezzo-soprano opera and concert singer born in Bačka Palanka, Serbia.
