= Bačka Palanka =

Bačka Palanka Бачка Паланка (Serbian) Báčska Palanka (Slovak)
- Town and municipality
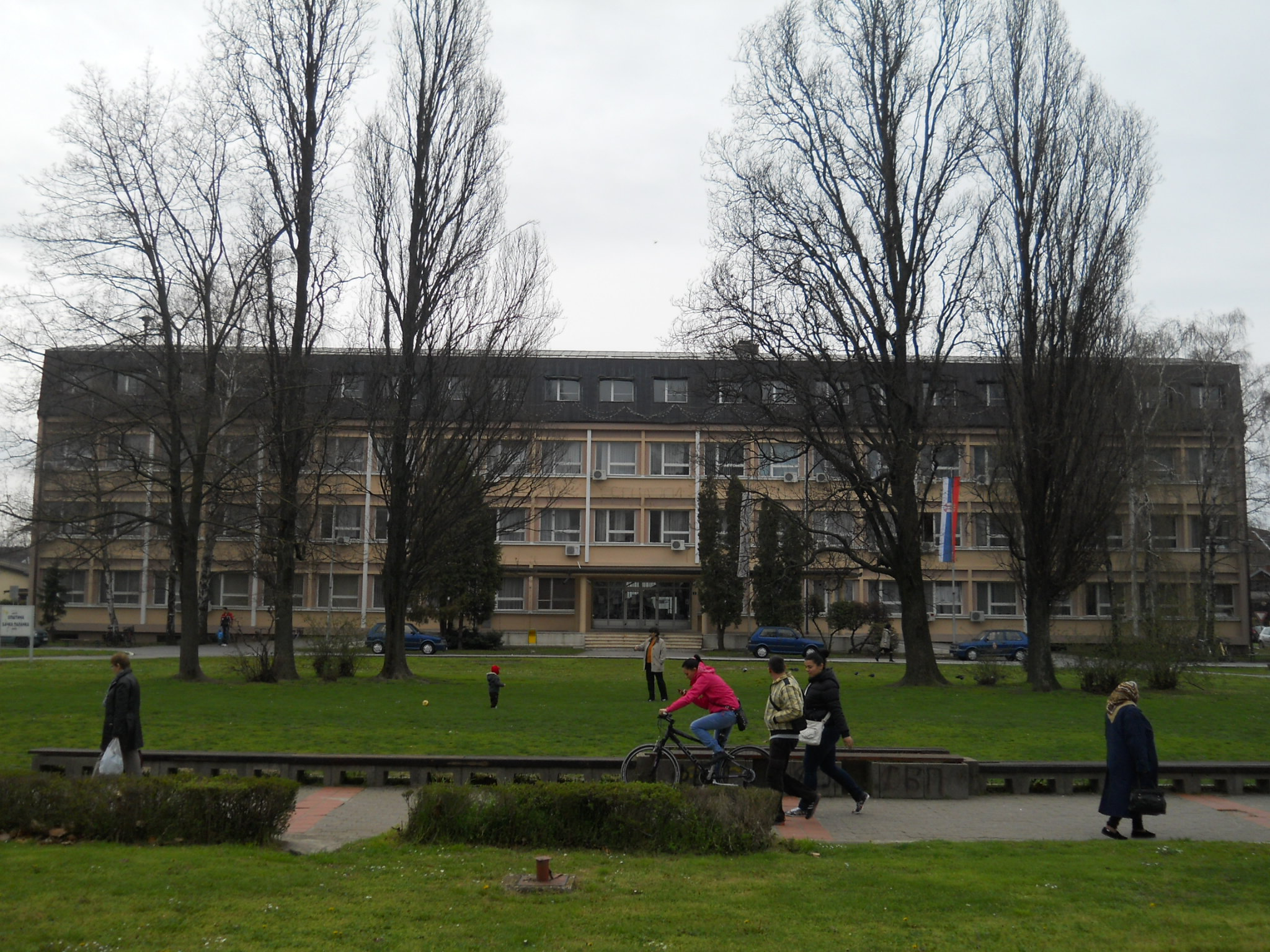
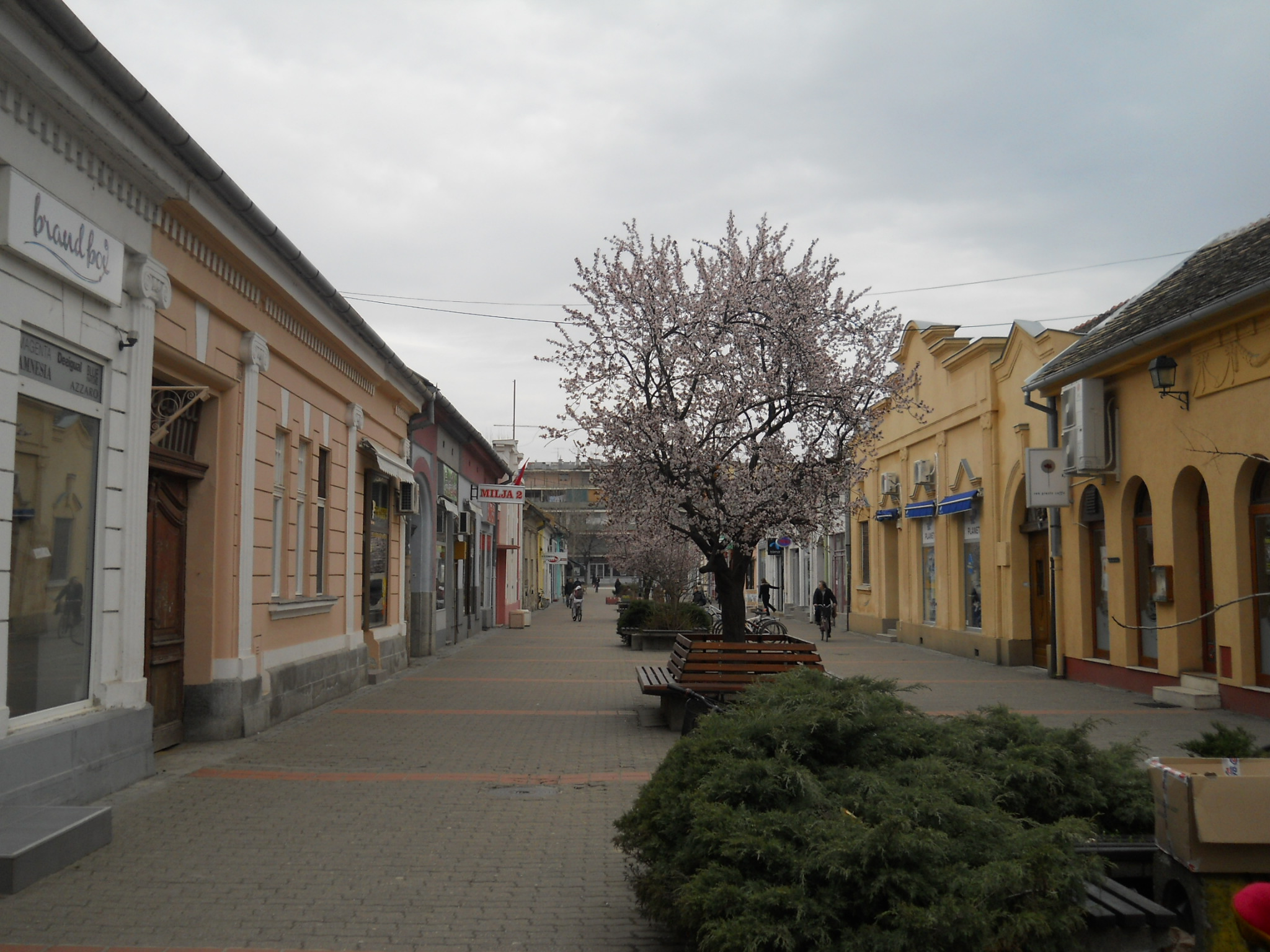
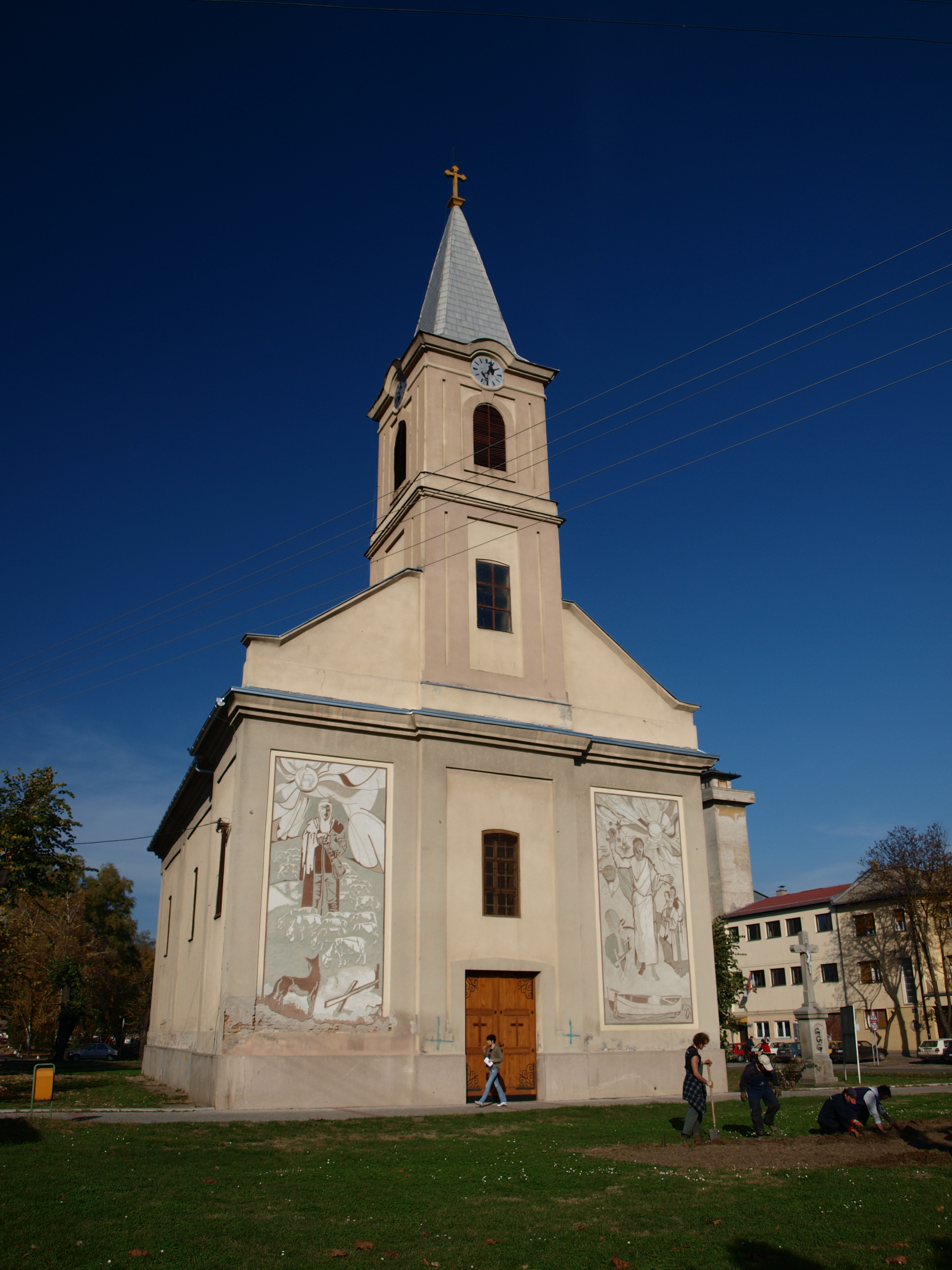
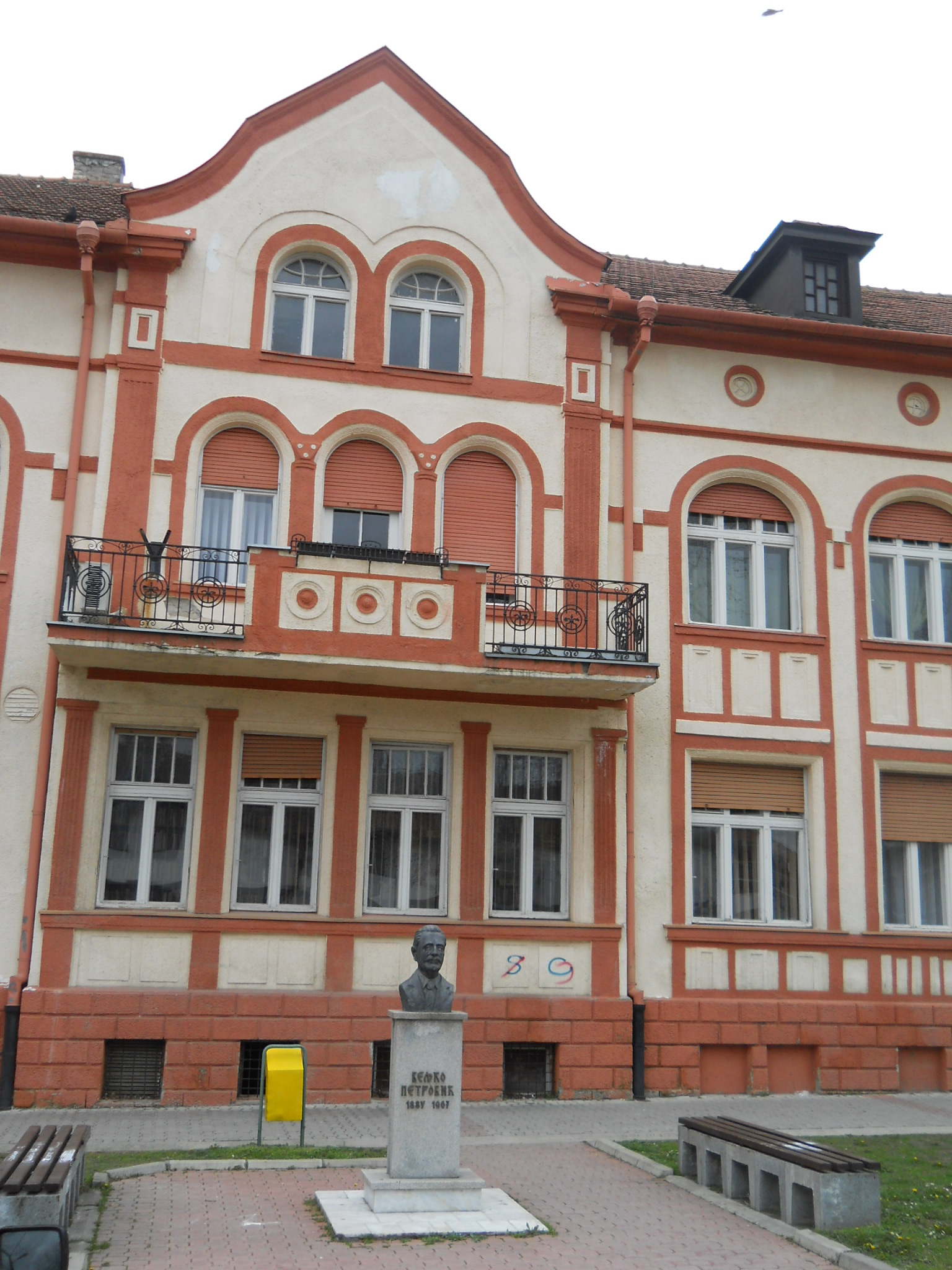
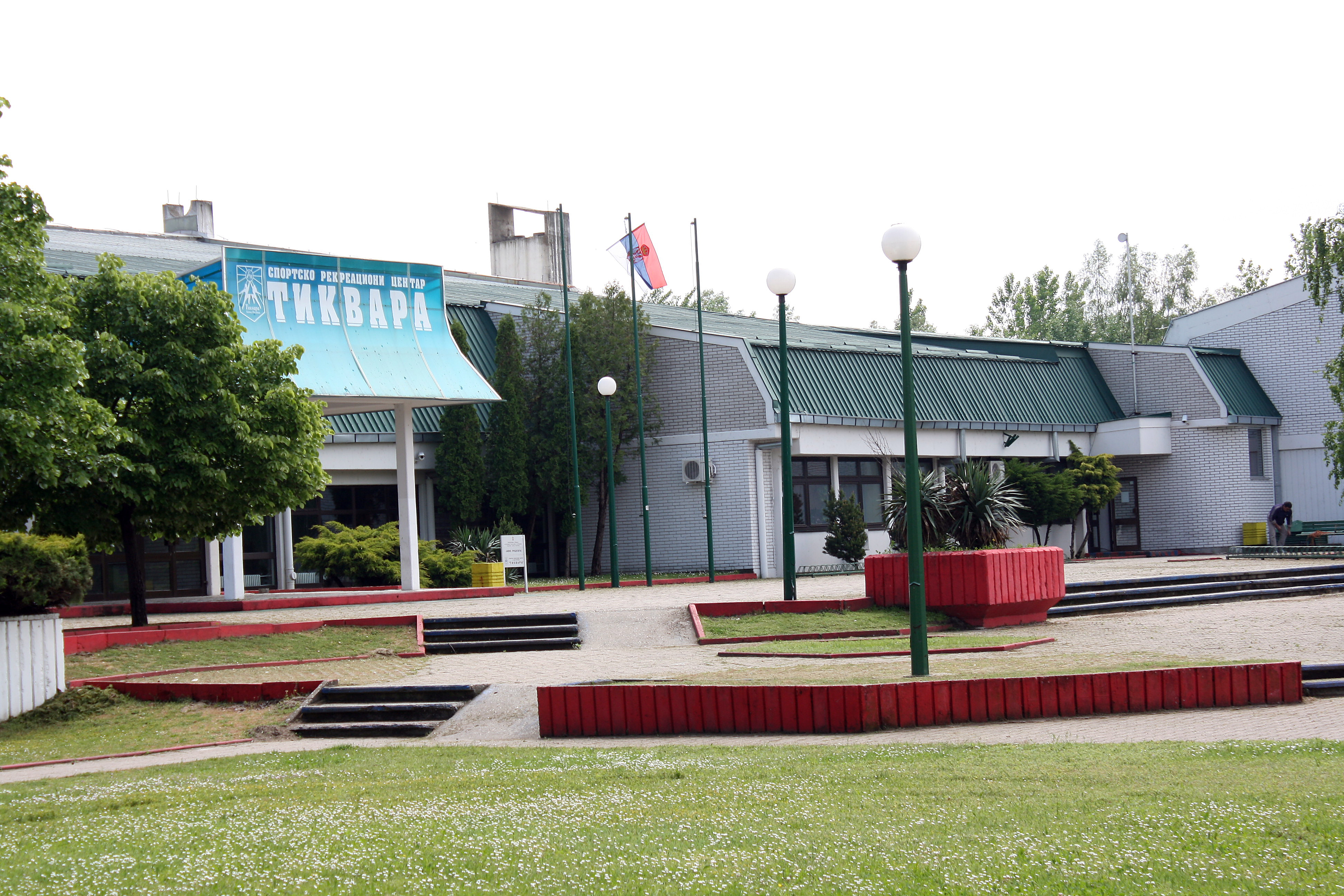
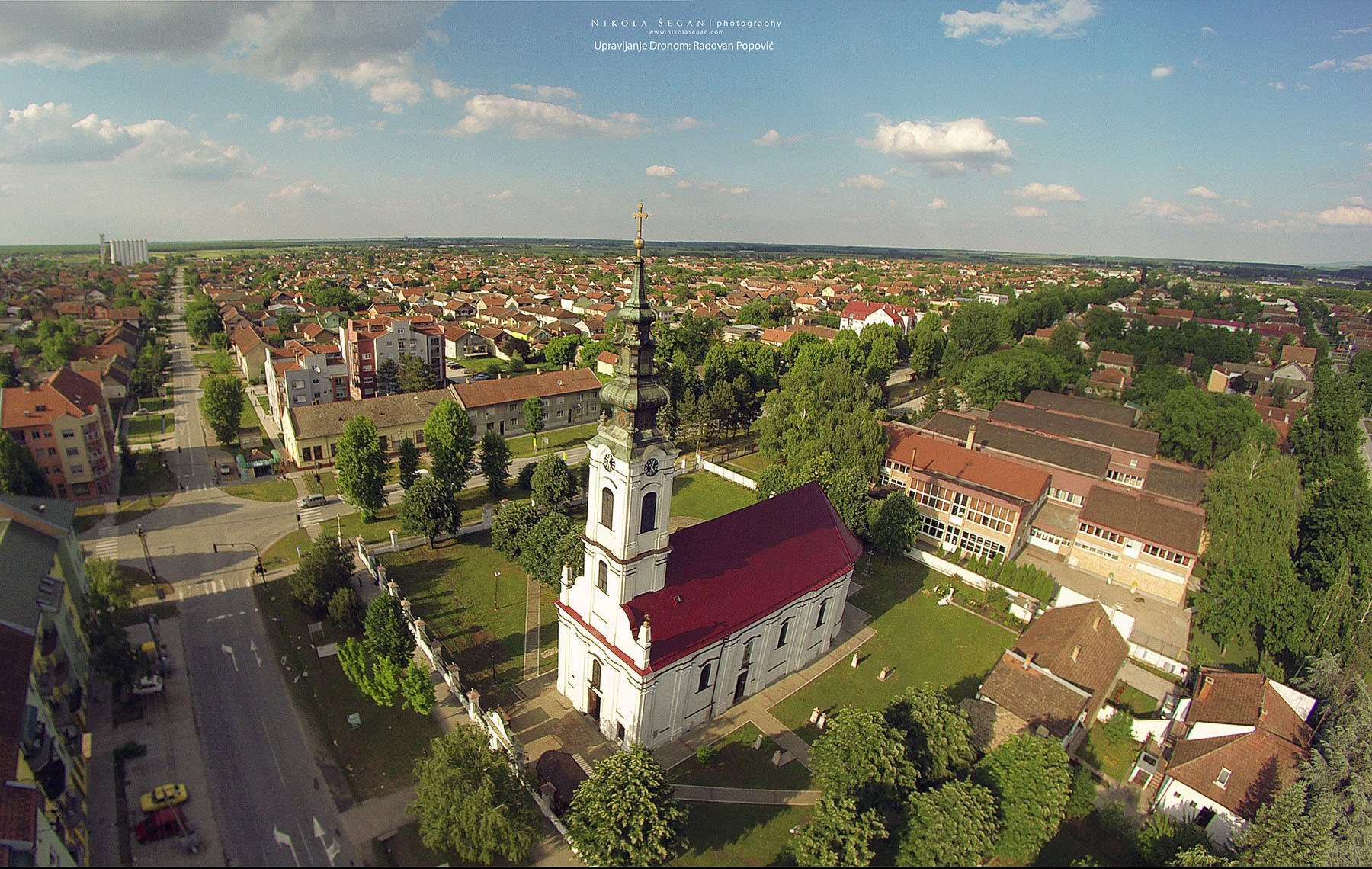
- From top: City Hall, Main pedestrian street, Catholic church in Bačka Palanka, Library "Veljko Petrović", Sports Recreation Center "Tikvara", Panorama of the city with the Church of St. John the Baptist

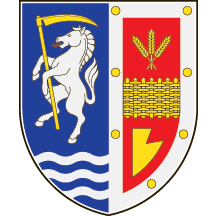
- Coat of arms

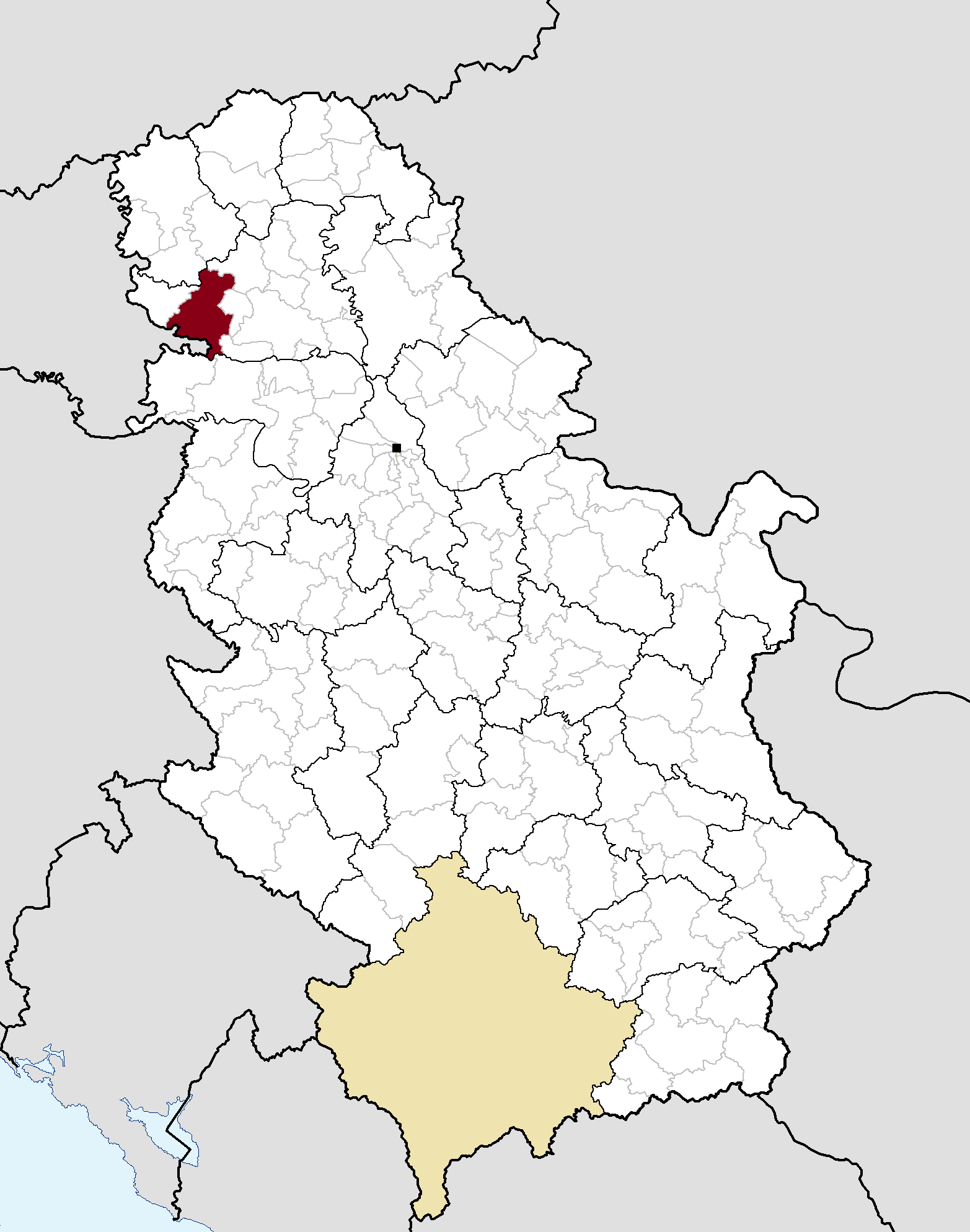
- Location of the city of Bačka Palanka in Serbia
- Interactive map of Bačka Palanka
- Coordinates: 45°15′N 19°24′E
- Country: Serbia
- Province: Vojvodina
- Region: Bačka (Podunavlje)
- District: South Bačka
- Municipality: Bačka Palanka
- Settlements: 14

Government
  - Mayor: Branislav Šušnica (SNS)

Area
  - Town: 130.42 km^{2} (50.36 sq mi)
  - Municipality: 589.84 km^{2} (227.74 sq mi)
- Elevation: 83 m (272 ft)

Population (2022 census)
  - Town: 25,476
  - Town density: 195.34/km^{2} (505.92/sq mi)
  - Municipality: 48,265
  - Municipality density: 81.827/km^{2} (211.93/sq mi)
- Demonym(s): Palančanin (♂) Palančanka (♀) (per grammatical gender)
- Time zone: UTC+1 (CET)
  - Summer (DST): UTC+2 (CEST)
- Postal code: 21400
- Area code: +381 21
- Car plates: BP
- Official languages: Serbian together with Slovak
- Website: www.backapalanka.rs

Bačka Palanka (Serbian Cyrillic: Бачка Паланка, pronounced [bâːtʃkaː pǎlaːnka]; Hungarian: Palánka) is a town and municipality located in the South Bačka District of the autonomous province of Vojvodina, Serbia. It is situated on the left bank of the Danube. In 2022 the town had a total population of 25,476, while Bačka Palanka municipality had 48,265 inhabitants.

== Name ==
In Serbian, the town is known as Бачка Паланка or Bačka Palanka, in Slovak as Báčska Palanka, in Croatian as Bačka Palanka, in Hungarian as Bácspalánka, in German as Plankenburg and in Turkish as Küçük Hisar.

Its name means "a town in Bačka" in Serbian. The word "palanka" itself originates from Turkish language. This word was also adopted by Serbs and it is used in the Serbian language with the same meaning. Older Serbian names for this town were Palanka (Паланка), Stara Palanka (Стара Паланка), Nova Palanka (Нова Паланка) and Nemačka Palanka (Немачка Паланка).

== History ==
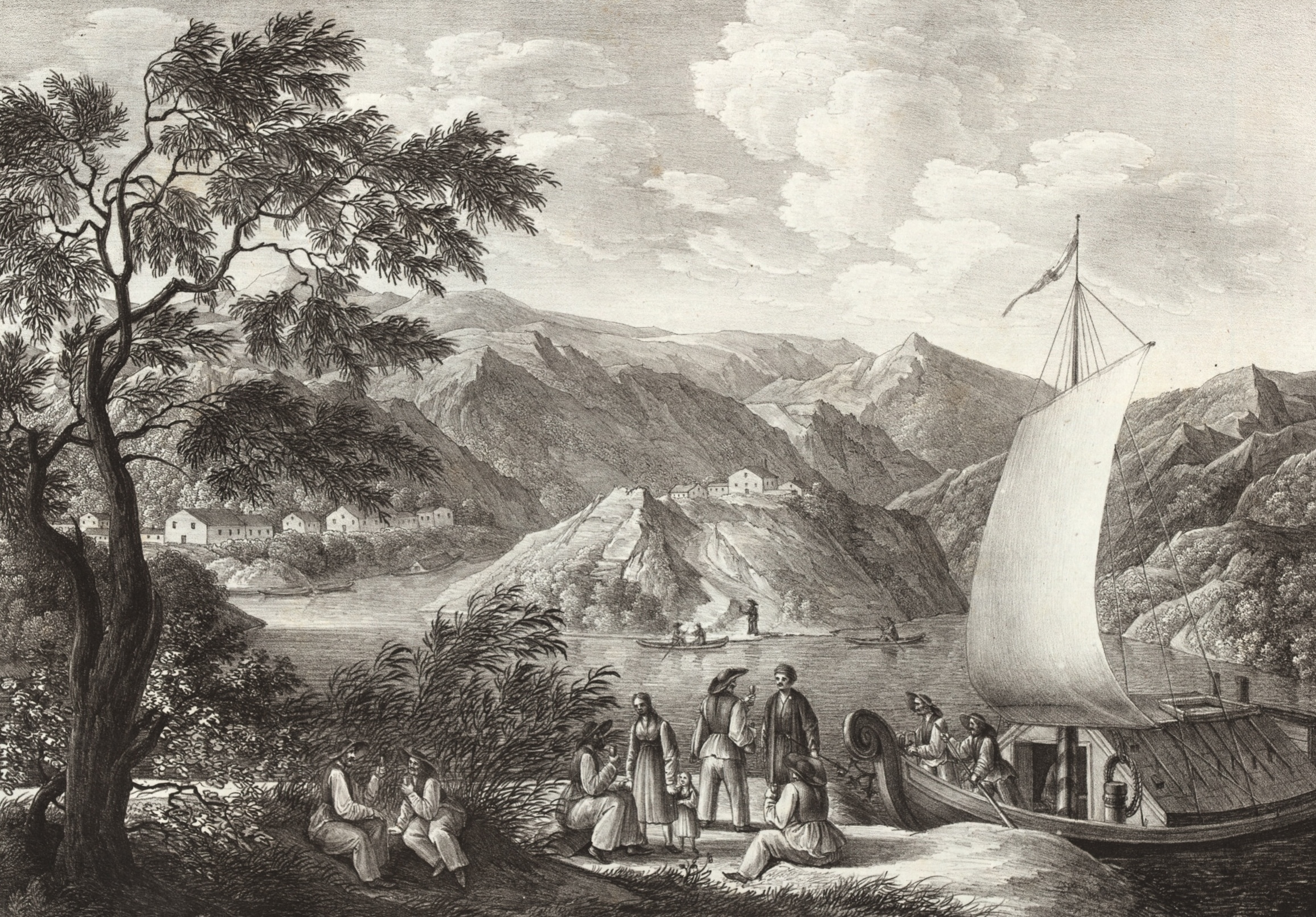
Lithograph of Palanka and surroundings, 1826

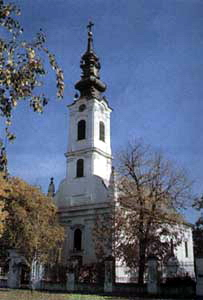
Church of St. John the Baptist

Archeologists have proved that people have lived in the area for centuries. There are many archaeological objects from the Stone Age, Bronze Age, Iron Age and Roman period.

In the 11th century, this area was populated by Hungarians and Serbs. Bačka Palanka is first mentioned as a settlement in 1486, as a suburb of Ilok called Iločka. Until the 16th century, this area was administered by the Kingdom of Hungary.

At the beginning of the 16th century, the village was the property of a landowner Laurence of Ilok, a duke of Syrmia. It was destroyed by the Ottomans after The Battle of Mohács in 1526, but was then rebuilt as a small Ottoman fortress named Palanka. During the Ottoman administration (16th-17th century), Palanka was mostly populated by ethnic Serbs.

In 1687 Palanka was absorbed into the Habsburg monarchy and more Orthodox Serbs settled here. Palanka was then mentioned as a small town with 167 houses, all of which were Serb (1720 census data). Later, Germans, Slovaks and Hungarians settled here as well.

It was part of the Habsburg Military Frontier from 1702 to 1744. Nova Palanka (New Palanka) was founded between 1765 and 1770, 2 kilometers away from the original Palanka (which then became known as Stara Palanka - Old Palanka) and Nemačka Palanka (German Palanka) was founded by Danube Swabians in 1783. Those three towns became one city, Bačka Palanka, in the 20th century.

Palanka's industrial development started in 1765, when a brick plant was built. It got its first post office in 1828. In 1875, one of the first libraries in Vojvodina was opened. In 1884 the Sintelon company was founded. In 1886, the first state school started functioning. By 1894, a railway was built from Bačka Palanka to Feketić and a first phone call was made to Novi Sad.

In the second half of the 19th century, the German population became more numerous than the Serbian. According to the 1910 census, the population of Stara Palanka was mostly Serb, while populations of Nova Palanka and Nemačka Palanka were mostly German (Danube Swabian). A large number of them immigrated to North America both before and after World War II. Trenton, New Jersey was the most popular settling place for these German Palankaers.

The city was under Habsburg administration until 1918, when it became part of the Kingdom of Serbs, Croats and Slovenes (later renamed as Yugoslavia). During the World War II (from 1941 to 1944), it was under Axis (Horty Hungary) occupation. In 1944, one part of Bačka Palanka's citizens of German ethnicity left the city, together with the defeated German army. As a consequence of the war, the site of a post-World War II work camp for the remaining ethnic Germans (Danube Swabians) was formed here under a new communist administration. After the work camps were dissolved (in 1948), the remaining German population was expelled from Yugoslavia in an ethnic cleansing. To replace the Germans, 3,609 (mostly Serb) colonists were settled in the town after World War II. Most of them originated from Bosnia and Herzegovina.

During the 1990s, about 5,000 refugees from Croatia and Bosnia moved to Bačka Palanka because of the Yugoslav wars. During the NATO bombing in 1999, Bačka Palanka was bombed by NATO twice, on 2 and 27 April. On both occasions the target was the Ilok–Bačka Palanka Bridge. It was only damaged, but not destroyed.

In 2002, 4 tons of fish stew were cooked at Kaloš Čarda at the Bager Lake in Bačka Palanka and it entered the Guinness Book of Records.

== Inhabited places ==
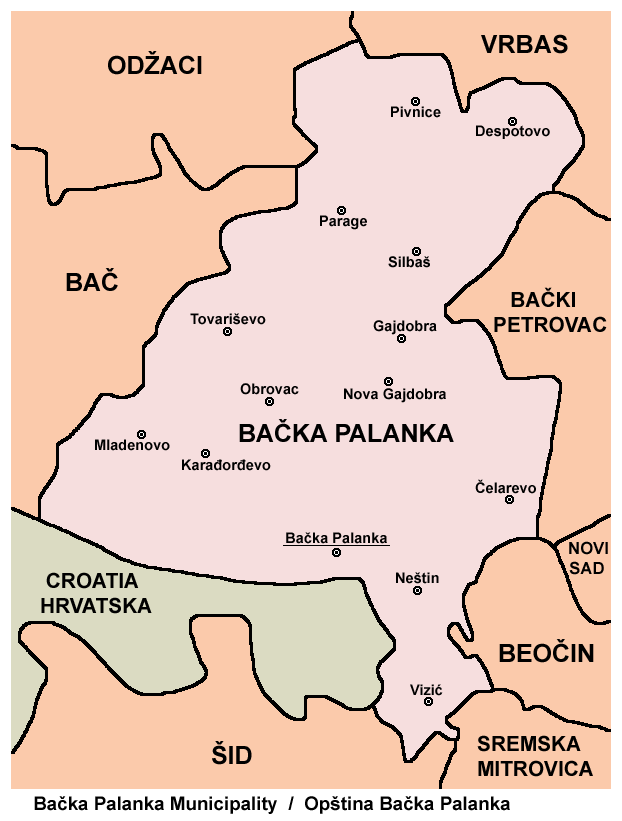
Map of Bačka Palanka municipality

The Bačka Palanka municipality includes the city of Bačka Palanka and several villages.

Villages on the northern bank of the river Danube, in the region of Bačka:

- Gajdobra
- Despotovo
- Karađorđevo
- Mladenovo
- Nova Gajdobra
- Obrovac
- Parage
- Pivnice
- Silbaš
- Tovariševo
- Čelarevo

Villages on the southern bank of the river Danube, in the region of Syrmia:

- Neštin
- Vizić

== Demographics ==
Historical population
Year	Pop.	±% p.a.
1948	46,795	—
1953	48,948	+0.90%
1961	52,199	+0.81%
1971	54,410	+0.42%
1981	58,155	+0.67%
1991	58,835	+0.12%
2002	60,966	+0.32%
2011	55,528	−1.03%
2022	48,265	−1.27%

According to the last official census done in 2011, the municipality of Bačka Palanka had 55,528 inhabitants.

Ethnic composition of the town and municipality:

Ethnic group	Population (town)	Population (municipality)
Serbs	23,155	43,843
Slovaks	1,055	5,047
Hungarians	1,003	1,356
Roma	262	1,064
Croats	520	819
Yugoslavs	117	160
Montenegrins	73	133
Germans	74	105
Others	1,980	3,001
Total	28,239	55,528

== Tourism ==
Tourism is developed in Bačka Palanka. The city is famous for Tikvara, a natural monument. Tikvara is a Danube lake. Tikvara covers an area of 5 square kilometres (1.9 square miles). The Tikvara Resort complex is built along the lake for practicing various sports, recreational and entertaining activities. There are 33 archeological sites in the municipality. It is also known for Karađorđevo, which has a hunting ground and horse farm. People enjoy racing derbies in Karađorđevo. At the time of Serbia's emancipation, engraver Marko Vujatović worked on the intricate iconostasis of the Serbian Orthodox Church of St. John the Baptist. Bačka Palanka's Serbian church is one of the oldest churches in Vojvodina some built on foundations of temples of even earlier times. The north of the town is the Bagremara forest.

== Economy and industry ==
Industry in Bačka Palanka started developing in the 18th century. The first companies were built in the second half of the 18th century. A brick plant was opened in 1765, and a tobacco storehouse was opened a year later. In 1974 the Bridge of Youth was built to connect Bačka Palanka and Ilok in Croatia. Today, Bačka Palanka falls among the ten most developed municipalities in Vojvodina. Bačka Palanka municipality is an agricultural and industrial center. The main industries are food, metallurgy, textiles, electronic and machine industry. The most famous factories are Enia, Sintelon, Tarkett, Nectar, Dunavprevoz, AD Bačka, Carlsberg, Marina, Majevica, Plattner, Žitoprodukt, Budućnost and others.

The following table gives a preview of total number of registered people employed in legal entities per their core activity (as of 2018):

Activity	Total
Agriculture, forestry and fishing	677
Mining and quarrying	-
Manufacturing	5,341
Electricity, gas, steam and air conditioning supply	40
Water supply; sewerage, waste management and remediation activities	504
Construction	334
Wholesale and retail trade, repair of motor vehicles and motorcycles	1,881
Transportation and storage	1,047
Accommodation and food services	380
Information and communication	69
Financial and insurance activities	190
Real estate activities	19
Professional, scientific and technical activities	297
Administrative and support service activities	444
Public administration and defense; compulsory social security	639
Education	762
Human health and social work activities	610
Arts, entertainment and recreation	172
Other service activities	176
Individual agricultural workers	822
Total	14,405

== Sports ==
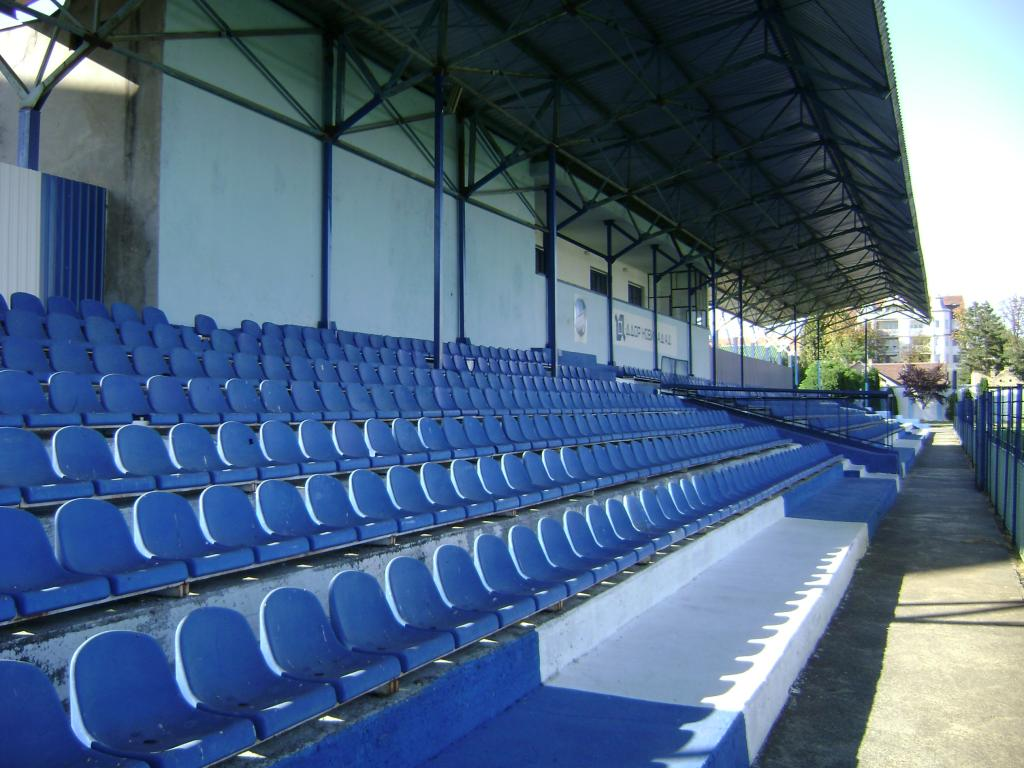
Stadion Slavko Maletin Vava, where FK Bačka plays

Sport is very popular in Bačka Palanka. People enjoy swimming in Lake Tikvara and cycling down the banks of The Danube. Sports include handball, football (soccer), basketball and karate. There is a chess tournament every year, Bačka Palanka Open.

The most famous sport clubs in Bačka Palanka are:

- OFK Bačka (before 2015 named FK Bačka Bačka Palanka), the most popular and most successful football (soccer) club in the municipality, and the second division club's longest trail in northern Serbia after the football club Spartak Subotica, Proleter Zrenjanin and Novi Sad.
- Stari Grad, football (soccer) club
- Krila Krajine, football (soccer) club
- FK ČSK Čelarevo, football (soccer) club in Čelarevo
- Sintelon, handball club
- Nopal, women's handball club
- Sintelon, kayak club
- Bačka Palanka, basketball club
- Bačka Palanka, table tennis club

== Politics ==
=== List of town mayors ===
- Zvezdan Kisić (Socialist Party of Serbia)
- Dragan Bozalo (Serbian Radical Party) (2004–08)
- Kosta Stakić (Democratic Party) (2008–10)
- Dragan Bozalo (Serbian Radical Party) (2010–12)
- Bojan Radman (Socialist Party of Serbia) (2012–13)
- Aleksandar Đedovac (Serbian Progressive Party) (2013–16)
- Branislav Šušnica (Serbian Progressive Party (2016–)

=== Municipal parliament ===
Seats in the municipality parliament won in the 2004 local elections:

- Serbian Radical Party (16)
- Democratic Party (9)
- Socialist Party of Serbia (6)
- Democratic Party of Serbia (4)
- Strength of Serbia Movement (3)
- Serbian Renewal Movement (2)
- Group of citizens "Club of Pivnice citizens" (2)

Seats in the municipality parliament after 2008 elections:

- SRS (18)
- DS (13)
- SPS (4)
- DSS (4)
- G17 (3)
- PSS
- SNP

== Notable people ==
- Alex Andjelic (1940–2021), ice hockey player and coach
- Bojan Beljanski (born 1986), handball player, silver medalist at the European championships
- Antal Benda (1910–1997), a Hungarian field handball player who competed in the 1936 Summer Olympics
- Jelena Bodražić (born 1971), a mezzo-soprano opera and concert singer
- Natasa Dusev-Janics (born 1982), a Hungarian canoeist, six-time Olympic medalist
- Franz Eisenhut (1857–1903), a Danube Swabian Orientalist and Realist painter
- Milan Janić (1957–2003), a sprint canoeist, Olympic silver medalist and World champion
- Zvezdan Jovanović (born 1965), also known as Zveki and Zmija (Viper), assassinated former Serbian Prime Minister Zoran Đinđić on 12 March 2003
- Mihalj Kertes (1947–2022), director of Federal Customs Bureau of Federal Republic of Yugoslavia, a close associate and man of trust of Slobodan Milošević
- Miljana Knezevic, a Serbian flatwater canoer. 3rd place (2007) in World championship and 3rd place (2008) in European championship
- Kálmán Konrád (1896–1980), a top football player in the Kingdom of Hungary in the 1910s
- Milan Kurepa (1933–2000), a renowned Serbian atomic physicist
- Branislav Lončar (1938–2019), a Serbian sport shooter, European champion
- Milan Mačvan (born 1989), Serbian basketball player, Olympic silver medalist
- Aleksandar "Aca Seltik" Petrović, singer of the band Orthodox Celts from Belgrade
- Đorđe Stojaković (1810–1863), Serbian revolutionary, active in the Revolutions of 1848
- Dragan Sudžum (born 1978), handball player
- Žarko Šešum (born 1986), handball player, silver medalist at the European championships
- Marko Vujin (born 1984), handball player, silver medalist at the European championships
- Dragan Zorić (born 1979), a Serbian flatwater canoer and 2006 world champion

== International relations ==
=== Twin towns – sister cities ===
Bačka Palanka is twinned with:

- Otradny, Russia
- Kalush, Ukraine
- Liptovský Mikuláš, Slovakia

== See also ==
- South Bačka District
- Bačka
- List of places in Serbia
- List of cities, towns and villages in Vojvodina
