= Đorđe Stojaković =

- Born: 11 April 1810; Bačka Palanka, Austrian Empire
- Died: 1863 (aged 52–53); Vienna, Austrian Empire
- Occupations: Political activist, lawyer, revolutionary

Đorđe Stojaković (Serbian: Ђорђе Стојаковић) (1810–1863) was a Serbian lawyer. He took an active role in the 1848 Revolutions which resulted in the creation of Serbian Vojvodina and Voivodeship of Serbia and Banat of Temeschwar. He was also a member of Matica Srpska.
