= Aleksandar Đedovac =

Serbian Progressive Party politician

Aleksandar Đedovac (Serbian Cyrillic: Александар Ђедовац; born 20 November 1969) is a politician in Serbia. He was the mayor of Bačka Palanka from 2013 to 2016 and has served in the Assembly of Vojvodina since 2016. Đedovac is a member of the Serbian Progressive Party.

== Private career ==
Đedovac has a Bachelor of Science degree in Mechanical Engineering.

== Politician ==
=== Municipal politics ===
Đedovac led the Progressive Party's electoral list for Bačka Palanka in the 2012 Serbian local elections and was elected when the list won nine mandates. The Progressive Party subsequently participated in a local coalition government, and Đedovac was appointed as deputy mayor. Following a restructuring of the local government in March 2013, he was reassigned as mayor. In 2014, Bačka Palanka was listed as the most successful municipality in Serbia in terms of development; in an interview with Al Jazeera Balkans, Đedovac credited this to the municipality's work in seeking out investors. He was not a candidate for re-election at the local level in 2016.

Đedovac also received the 163rd position on the Progressive Party's Let's Get Serbia Moving list in the 2012 Serbian parliamentary election. The list won seventy-three seats, and he was not elected.

=== Assembly of Vojvodina ===
Đedovac was given the forty-seventh position on the Progressive Party's list in the 2016 Vojvodina provincial election and was elected when the list won a majority victory with sixty-three out of 120 mandates. He was promoted to the twenty-eighth position on the list in the 2020 provincial election and was re-elected when the list won an increased majority with seventy-six mandates. He is now the chair of the assembly committee on security and a member of the committee on national equality.
