= Gajdobra =

Gajdobra Гајдобра (Serbian)
- Village (Selo)
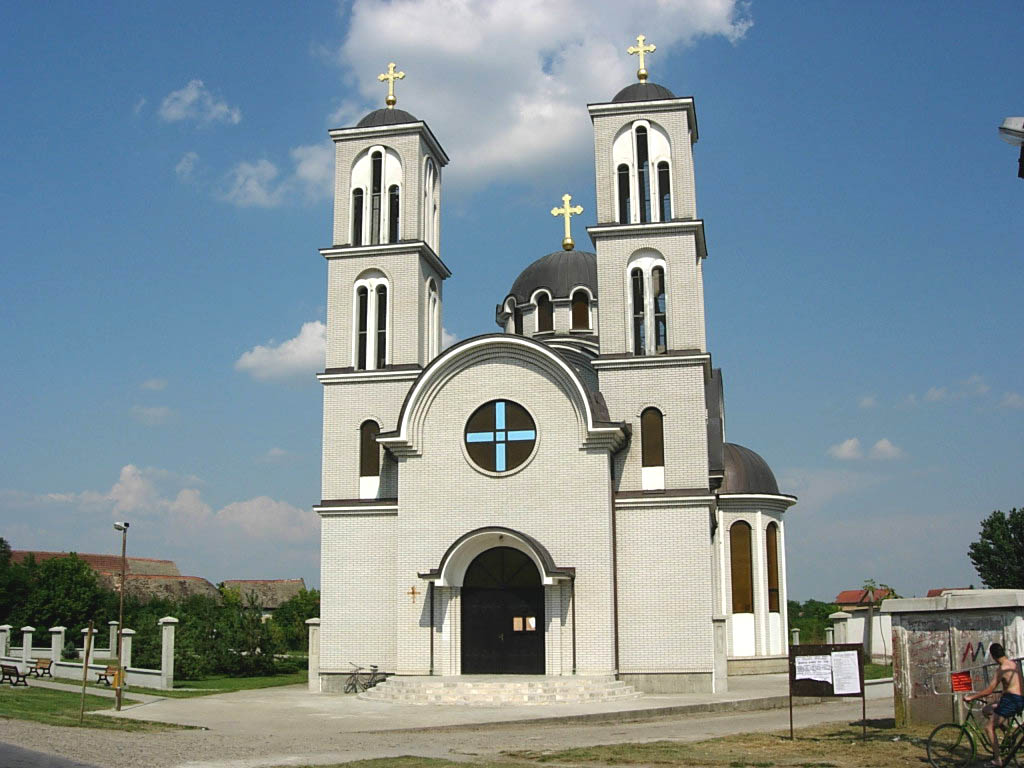
- The Orthodox church

- Location within Vojvodina Location within Serbia Location within Europe
- Coordinates: 45°21′N 19°27′E
- Country: Serbia
- Province: Vojvodina
- Region: Bačka
- District: South Bačka
- Municipality: Bačka Palanka

Area
  - Total: 24.8 km^{2} (9.6 sq mi)
- Elevation: 91 m (299 ft)

Population (2011)
  - Total: 2,578
  - Density: 104/km^{2} (269/sq mi)
- Time zone: UTC+1 (CET)
  - Summer (DST): UTC+2 (CEST)

Gajdobra (Serbian Cyrillic: Гајдобра) is a village located in the Bačka Palanka municipality, in the South Bačka District of Serbia. It is situated in the autonomous province of Vojvodina. Gajdobra has a total population of 2,578 inhabitants (as of 2011 census). Most of the inhabitants of the village are ethnic Serbs.

== History ==
According to the archeologists, people have lived here since Neolithic period. During the Middle Ages Gajdobra was important because of a route which connected the village with Bač. In 1464, settlement called Dobra is mentioned where Gajdobra is today. Name "Dobra" is of Slavic origin and means "the good (place)". The same village was mentioned in 1554 (at the same time village Gajdobra was also mentioned, but it had only 2 families living in the village) and in 1570. Two other villages are also mentioned in the 16th century, Gornja Dobra (Upper Dobra) and Donja Dobra (Lower Dobra). All these villages were populated by ethnic Serbs. In 1698 village had no people living there at all. In 1702, Serbs started settling in Gajdobra again.

In 1763, Germans settled in Gajdobra. A small church was built in 1767. Roman Catholic church was built in 1791, and it still exists today (It was reconstructed in 1897).

== Demographics ==
Historical population
Year	Pop.	±% p.a.
1948	3,627	—
1953	3,764	+0.74%
1961	4,056	+0.94%
1971	3,567	−1.28%
1981	3,272	−0.86%
1991	3,171	−0.31%
2002	2,968	−0.60%
2011	2,578	−1.55%
2022	2,089	−1.89%

According to the 2022 census results, the village has a population of 2,089 inhabitants.

=== Ethnic groups ===
1991

According to the 1991 census, Gajdobra had a total population of 3,171 inhabitants, including:

- Serbs = 2,914 (91.9%)
- Yugoslavs = 109 (3.4%)
- Croats = 37 (1.2%)
- Montenegrins = 32 (1%)
- Slovaks = 32 (1%)
- Hungarians = 14 (0.4%)
- Macedonians = 10 (0.3%)
- Germans = 1 (0.03%)
- Others (Rusyns, ethnic Muslims, etc.) = 22 (0.7%)

2002

According to the 2002 census, Gajdobra had a total population of 2,968 inhabitants, including:

- Serbs = 2,808 (94.61%)
- Slovaks = 34 (1.15%)
- Croats = 21
- Hungarians = 19
- Yugoslavs = 16
- Montenegrins = 15
- Others.

== Gallery ==
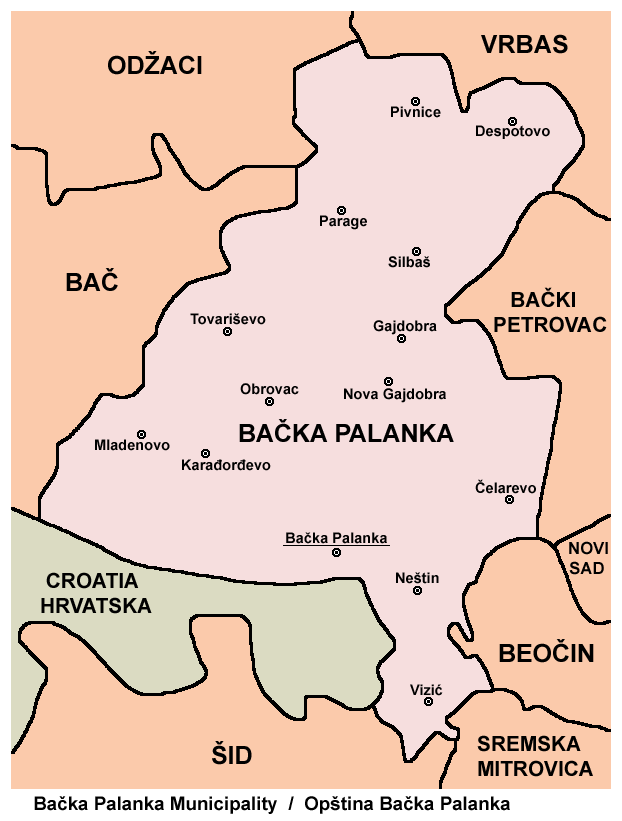
Map of the Bačka Palanka municipality, showing the location of Gajdobra

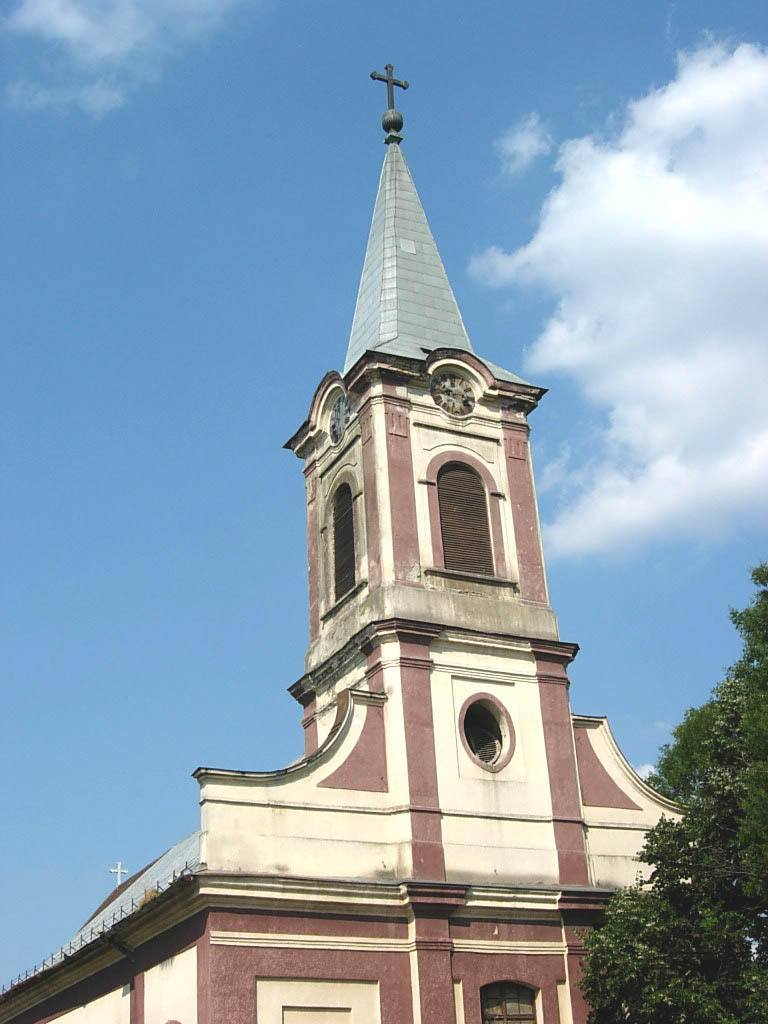
Saint Martin the Bishop Catholic Church.

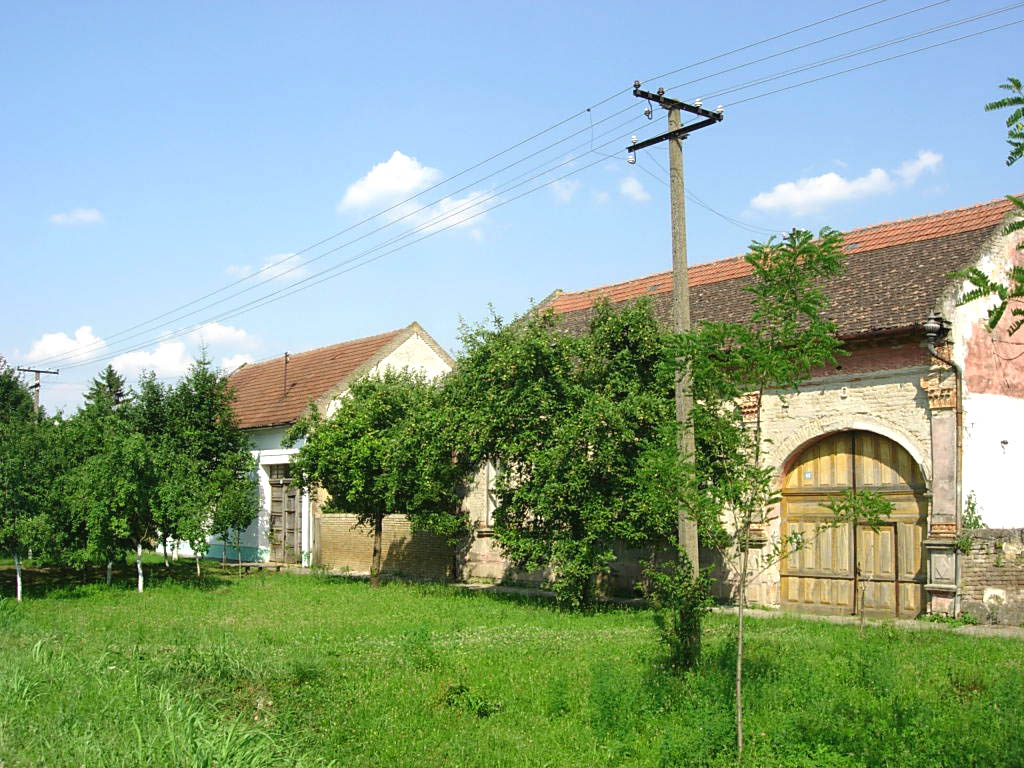
Old houses in the village.

== See also ==
- Bačka
- List of places in Serbia
- List of cities, towns and villages in Vojvodina
