= Church of the Nativity of the Blessed Virgin Mary, Bačka Palanka =

Church of the Nativity of the Blessed Virgin Mary
- Crkva Bezgrešnog začeća blažene djevice Marije
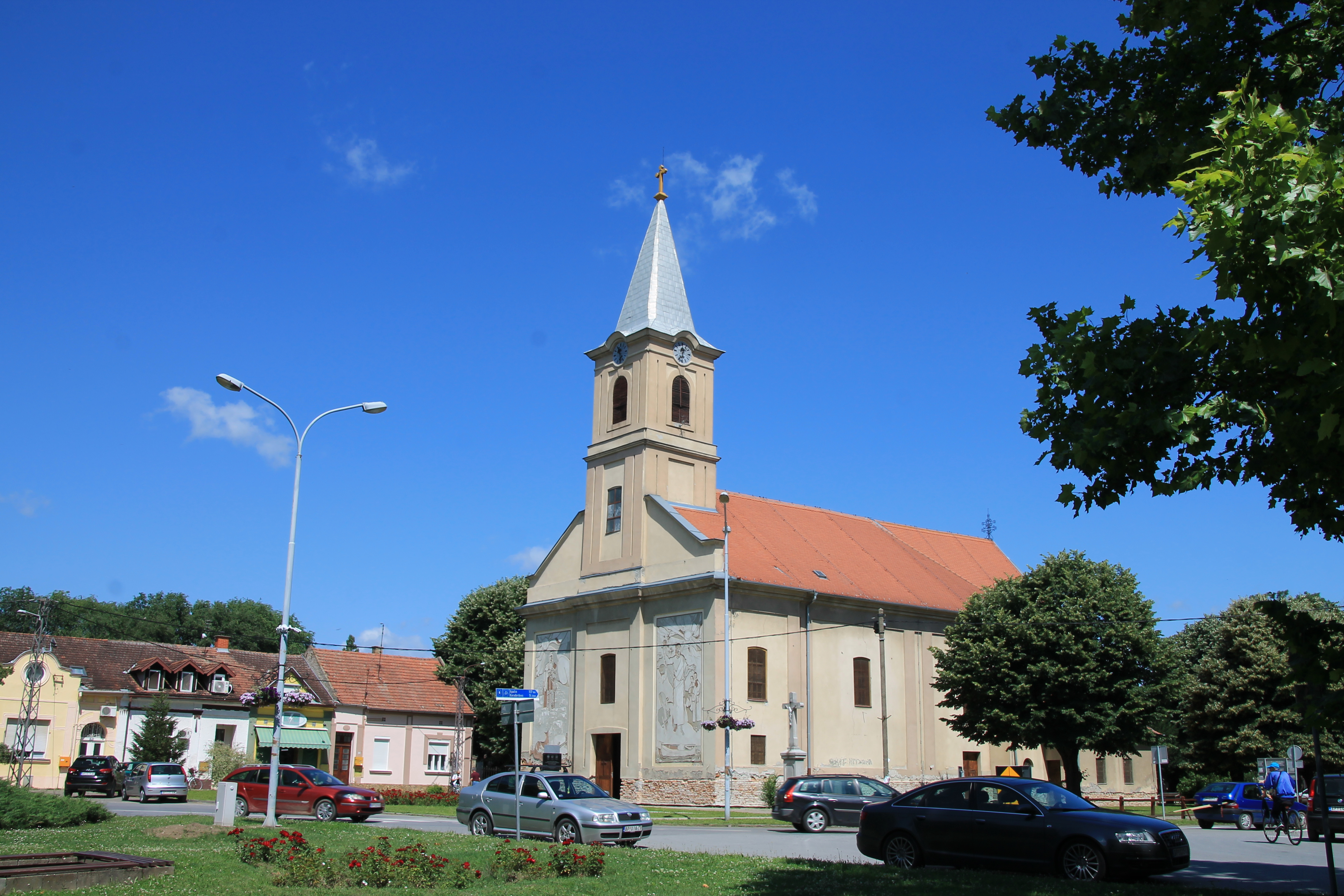
- Church of the Nativity of the Blessed Virgin Mary
- Church of the Nativity of the Blessed Virgin Mary
- 45°15′01″N 19°22′57″E
- Location: Bačka Palanka, Vojvodina
- Country: Serbia
- Denomination: Roman Catholic

History
- Dedication: Nativity of the Blessed Virgin Mary

Architecture
- Style: Neoclassicism
- Years built: 1782-1787

Administration
- Archdiocese: Roman Catholic Diocese of Subotica

Church of the Nativity of the Blessed Virgin Mary (Serbo-Croatian: Crkva Bezgrešnog začeća blažene device Marije) is a Roman Catholic Parish church in Bačka Palanka in Vojvodina, Serbia. The church was constructed in period between 1782 and 1787. The local parish was firstly mentioned in 1237 under the name of Pest and was re-established in 1755 from a section of the Church of the Nativity of Saint John the Baptist of Mladenovo parish area. At that time it was administered from catholic church in Ilok just across the Danube river in what is now easternmost town of Croatia.
