= South Bačka District =

Administrative district of Serbia

South Bačka District Јужнобачки округ
- Administrative district of Serbia
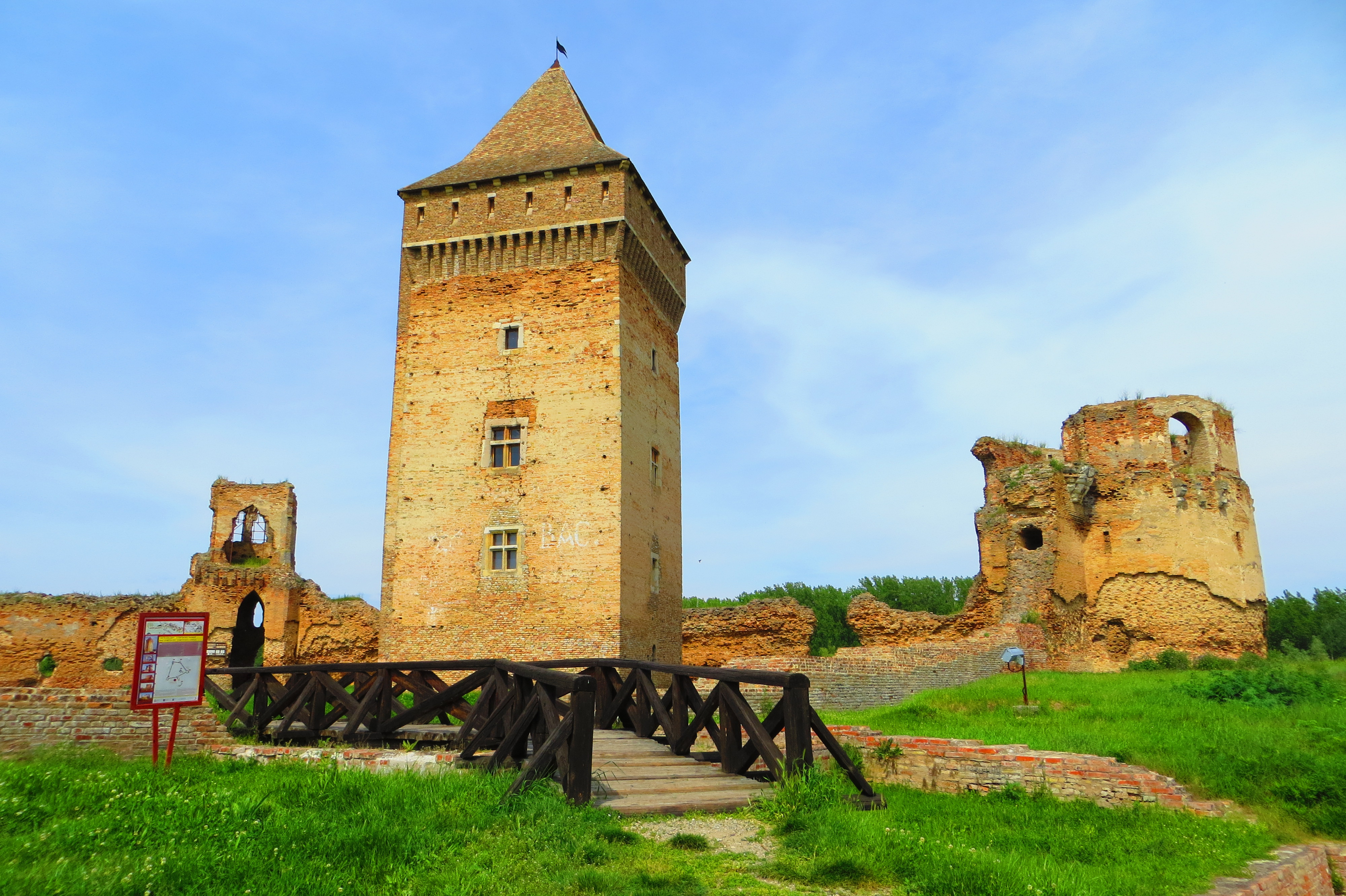
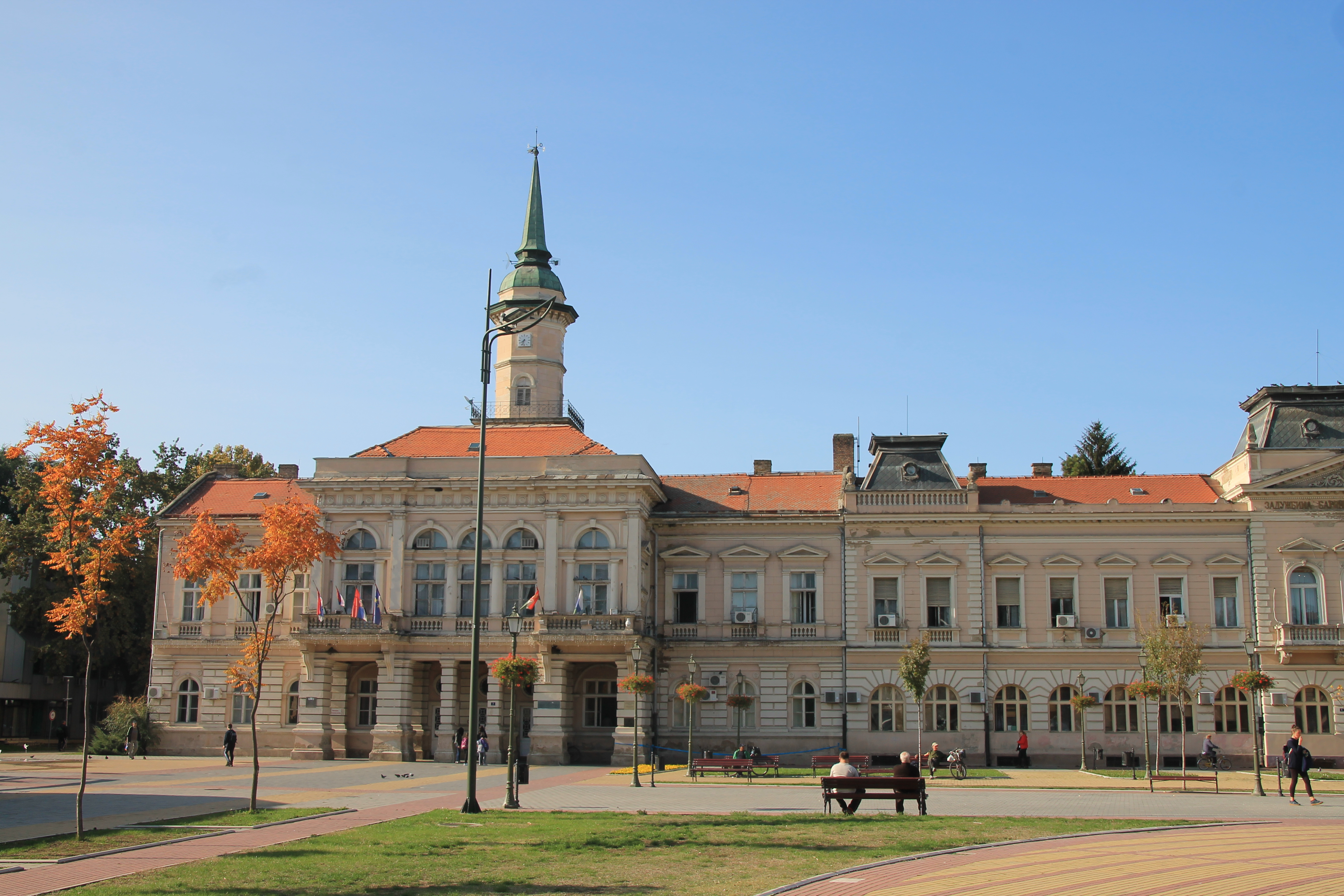
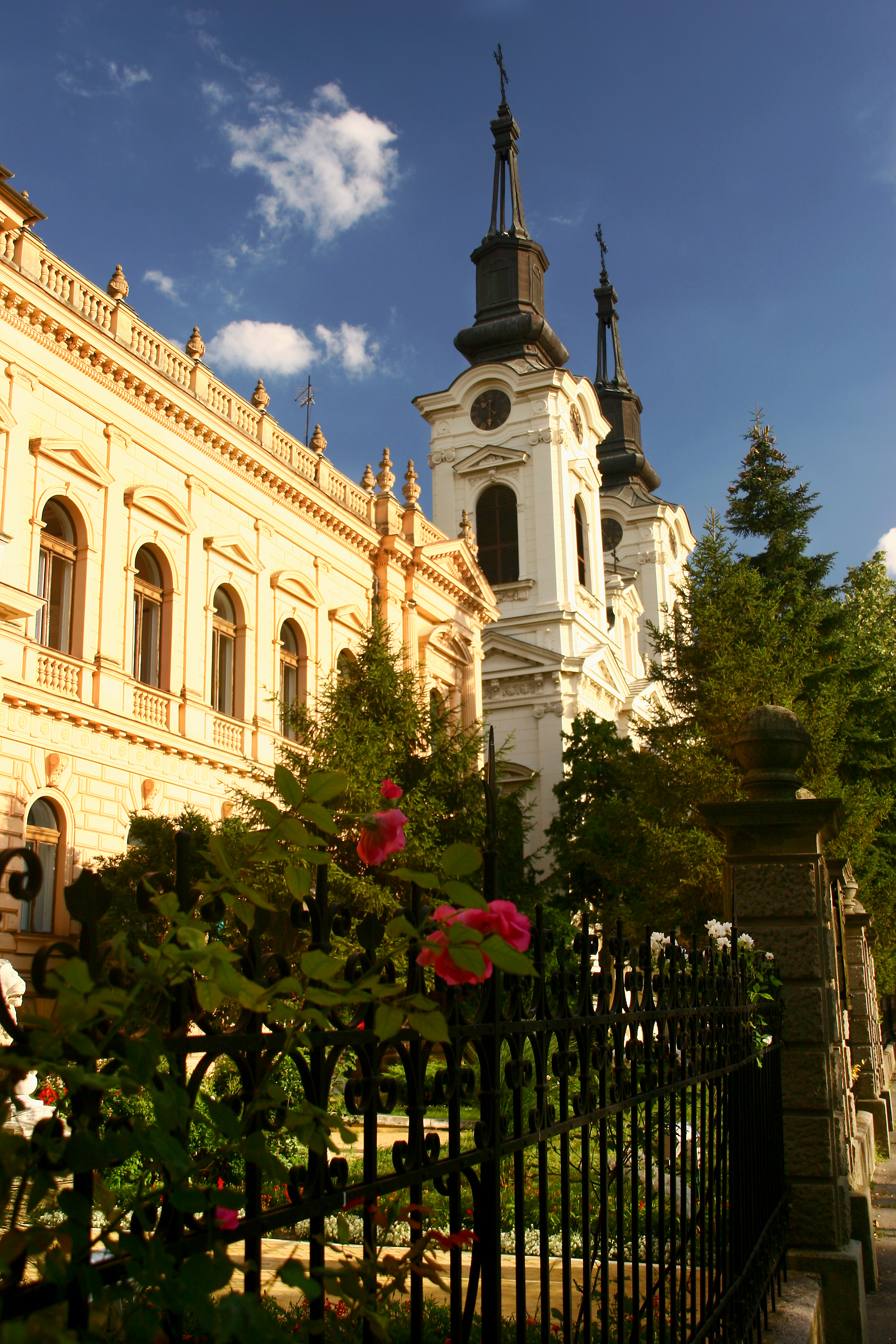
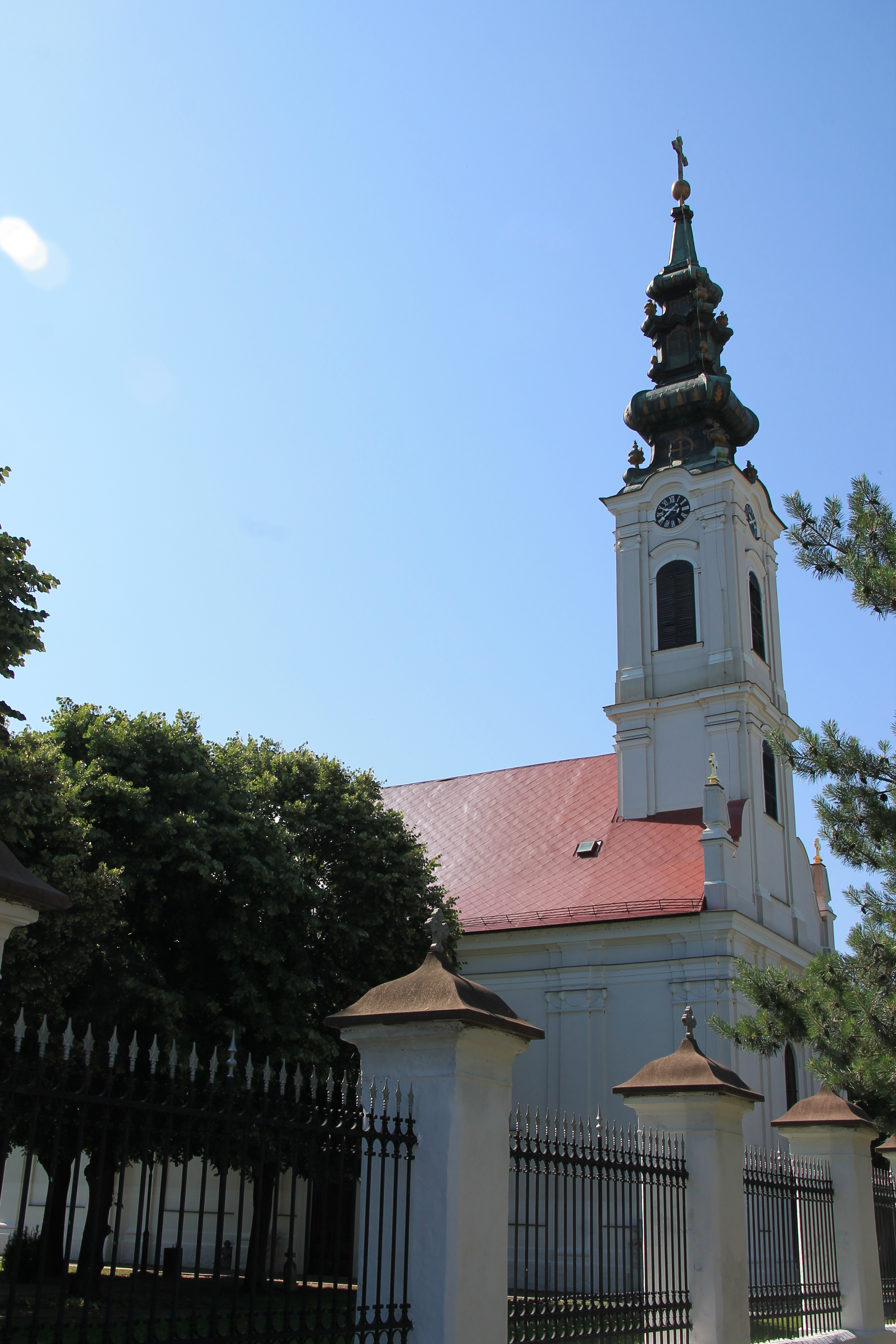
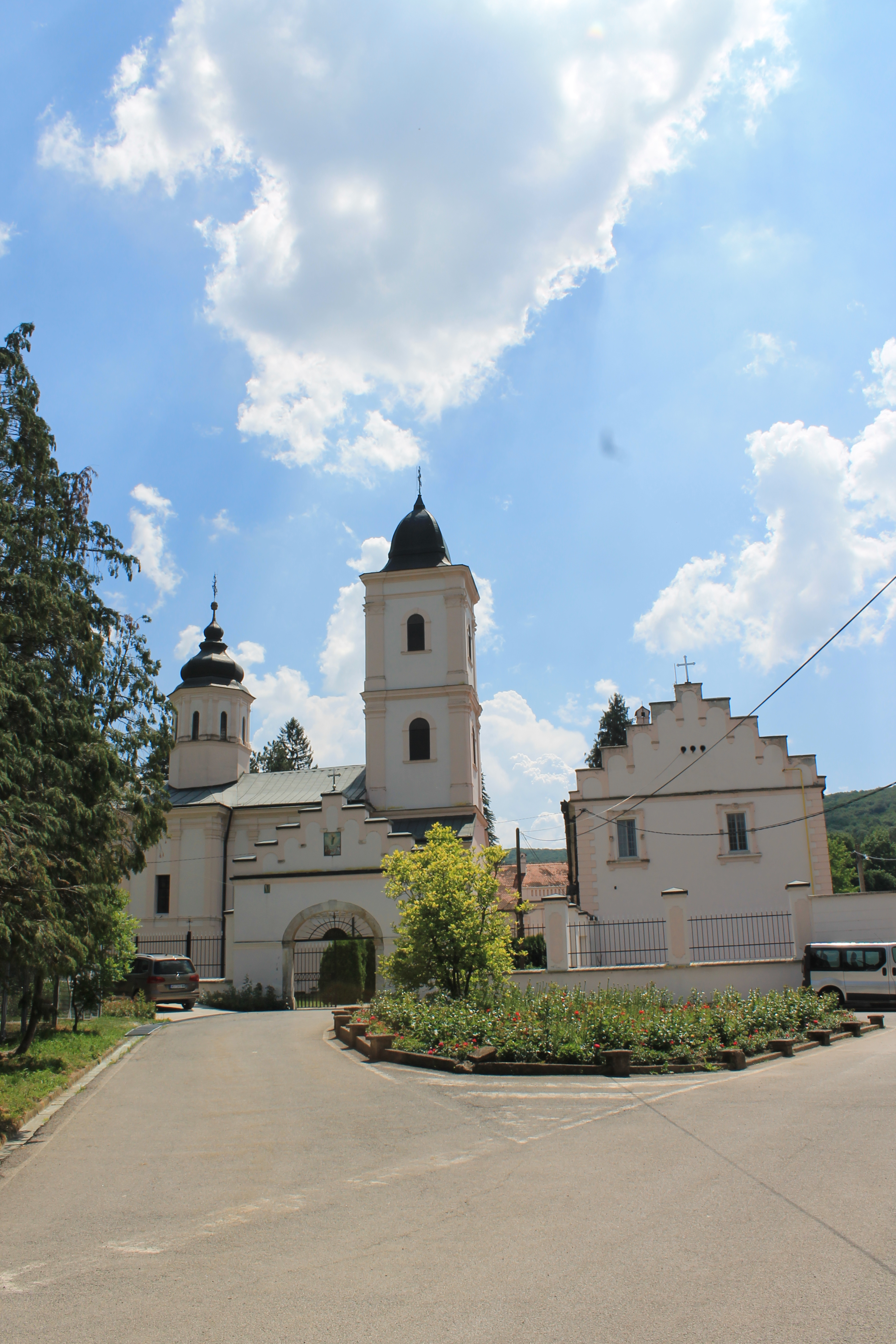
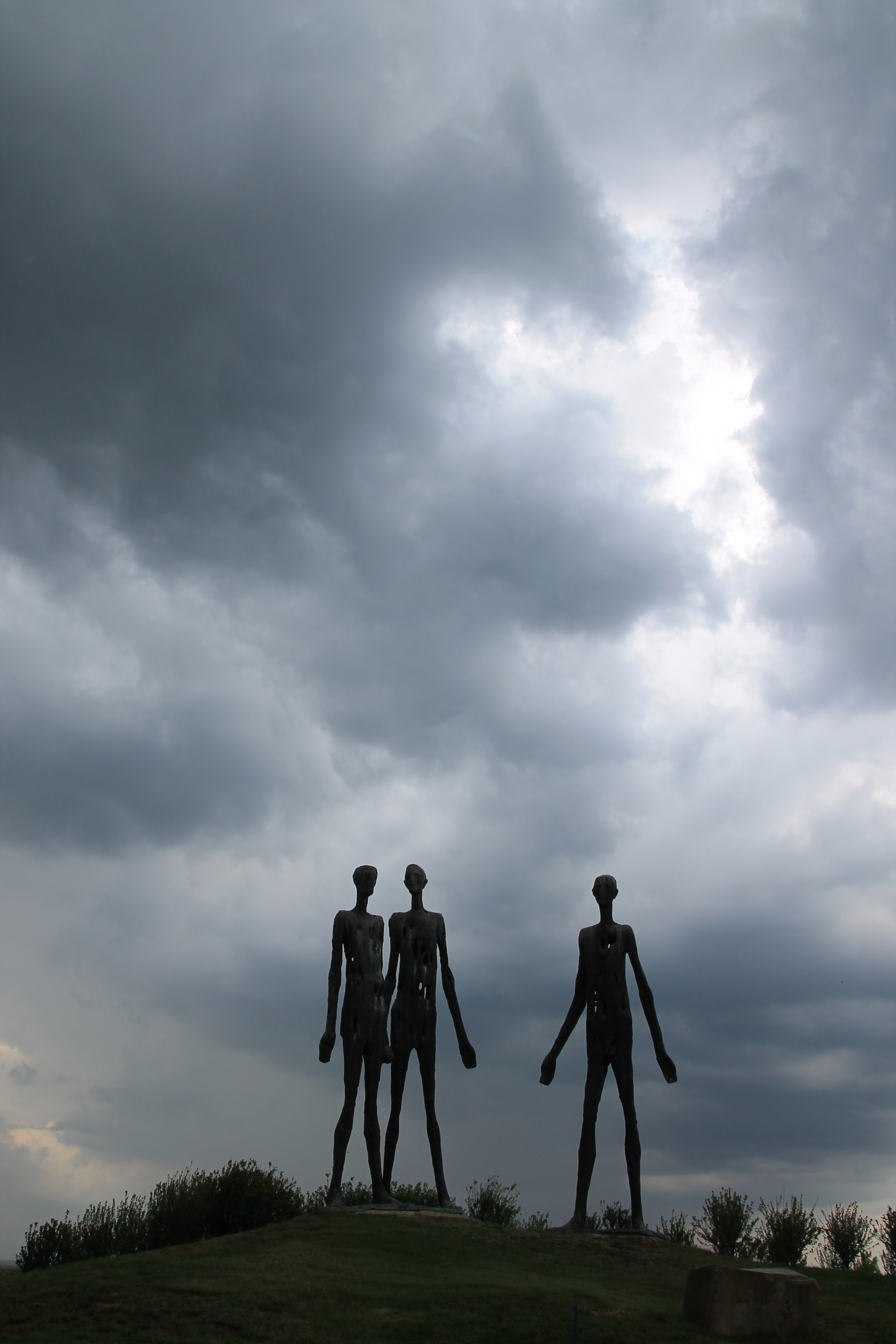
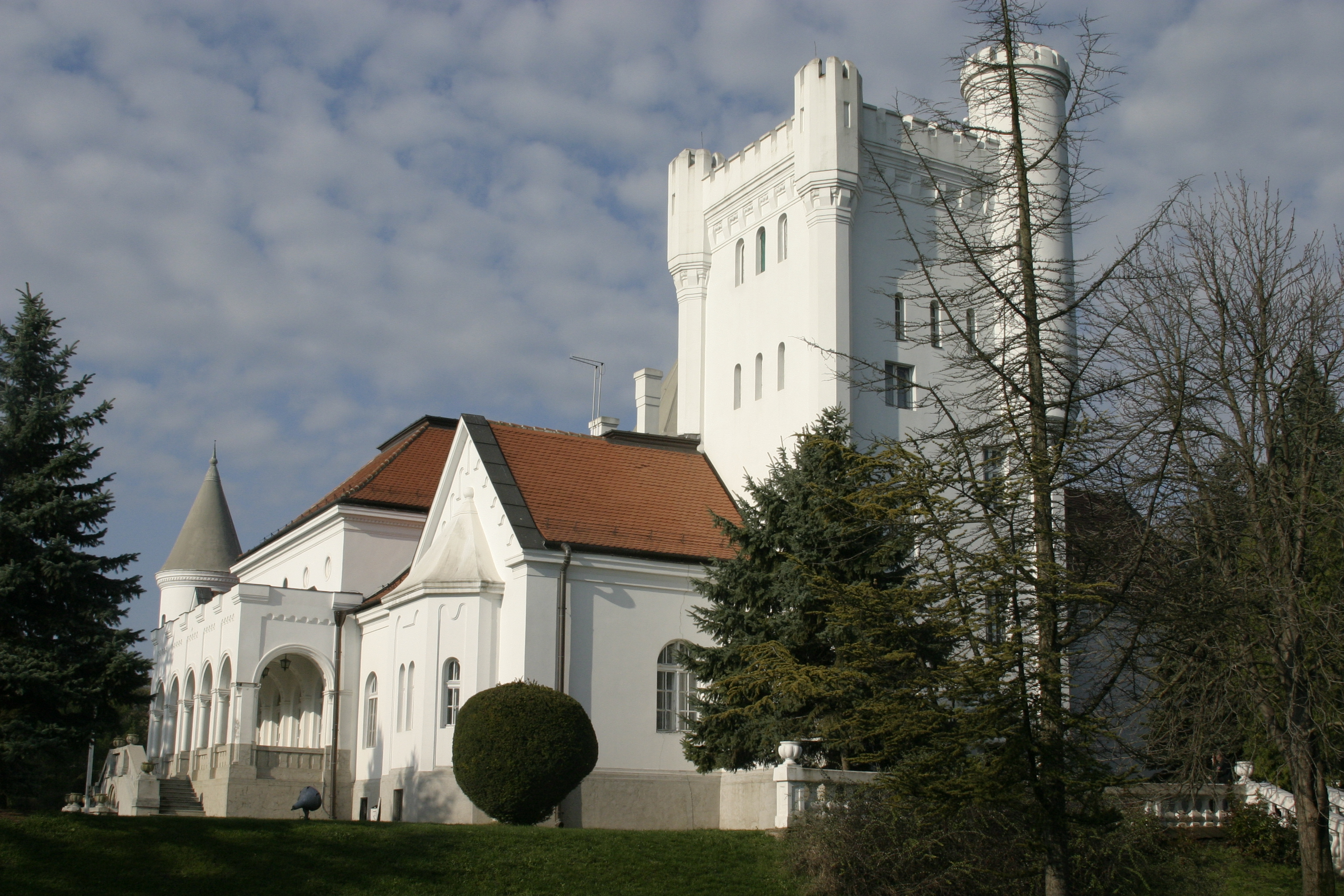
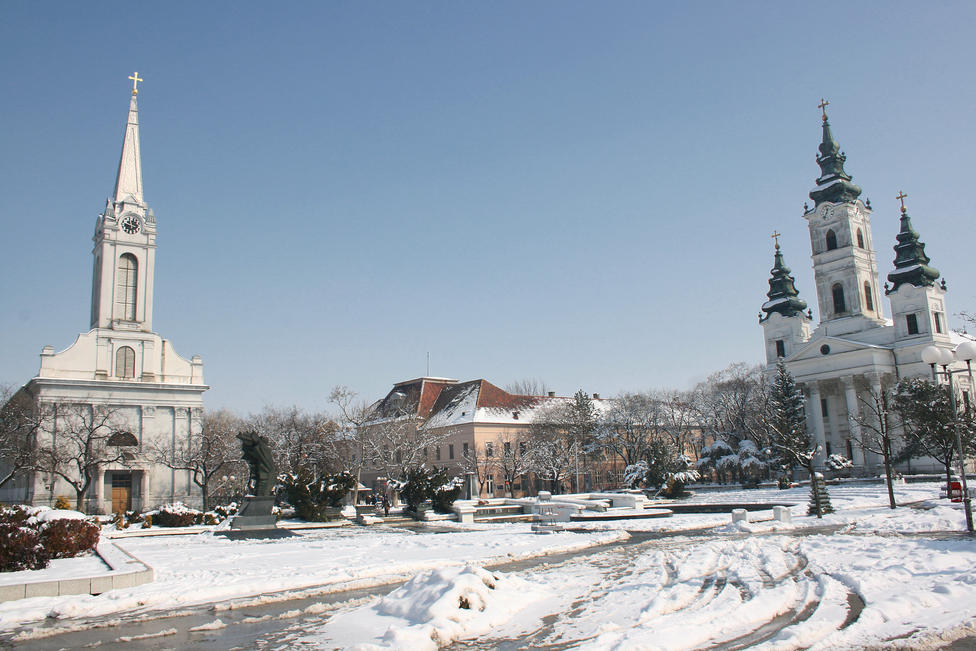
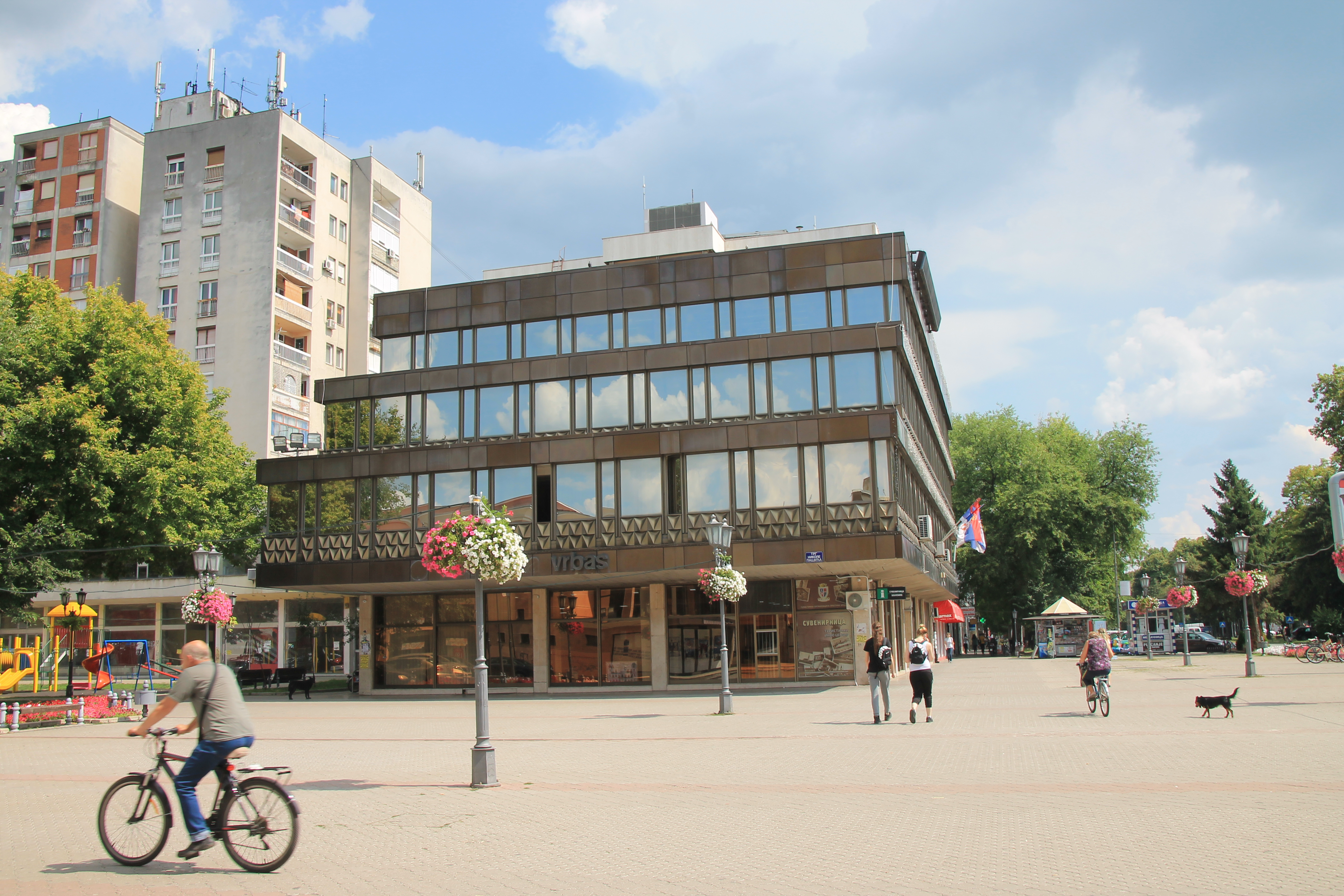
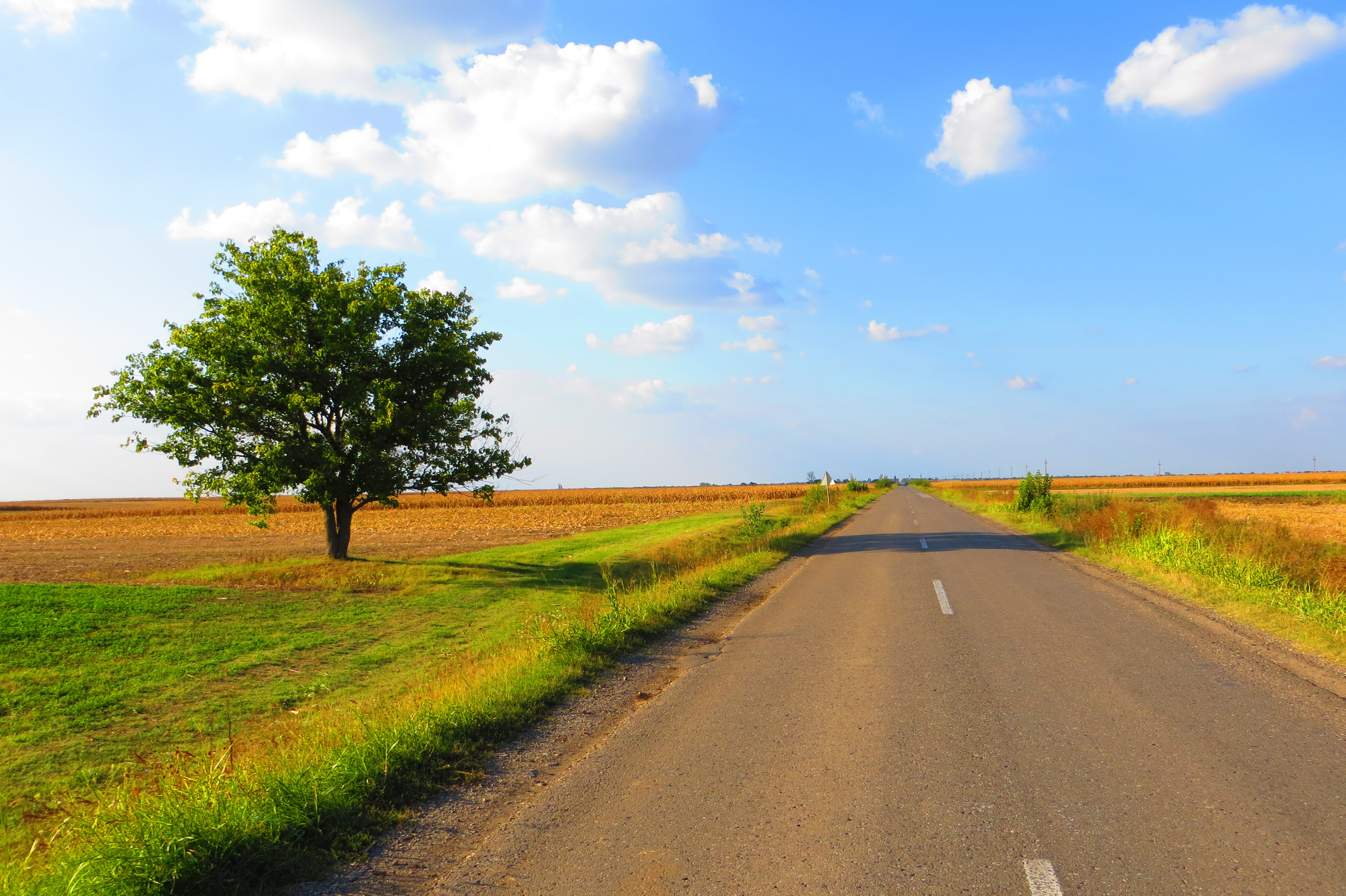
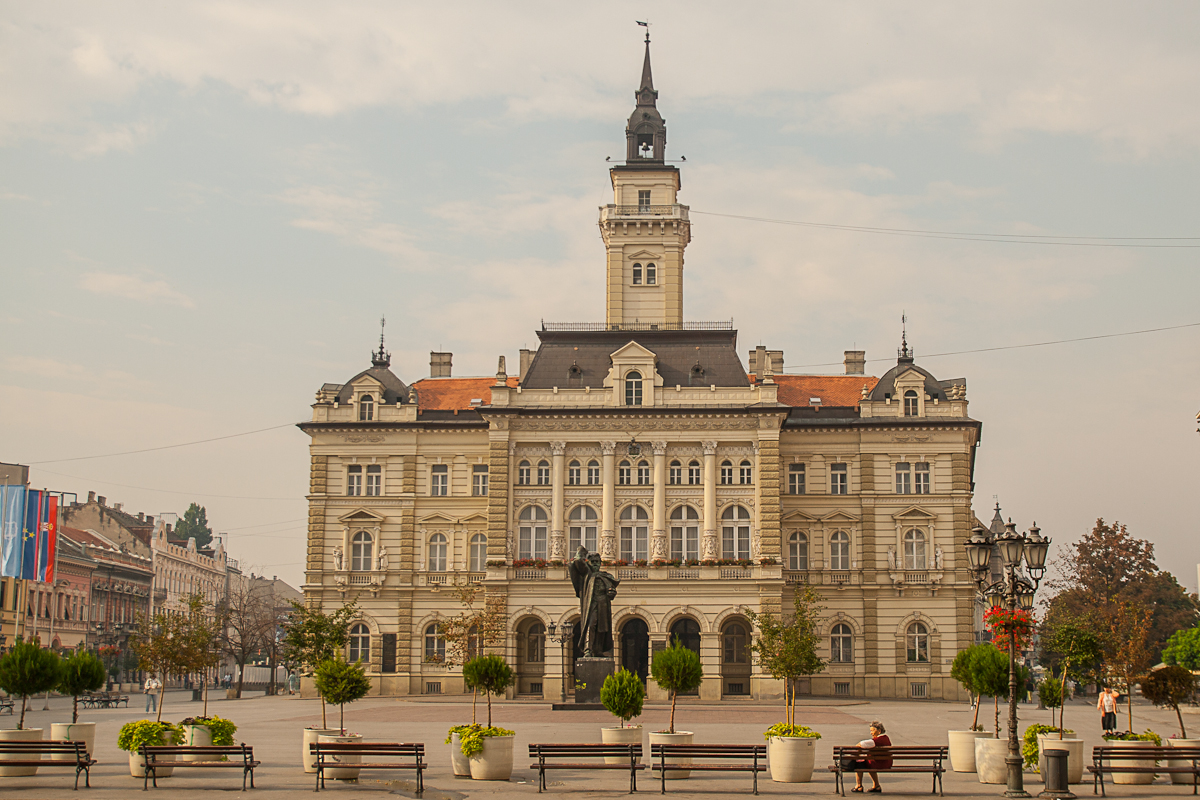
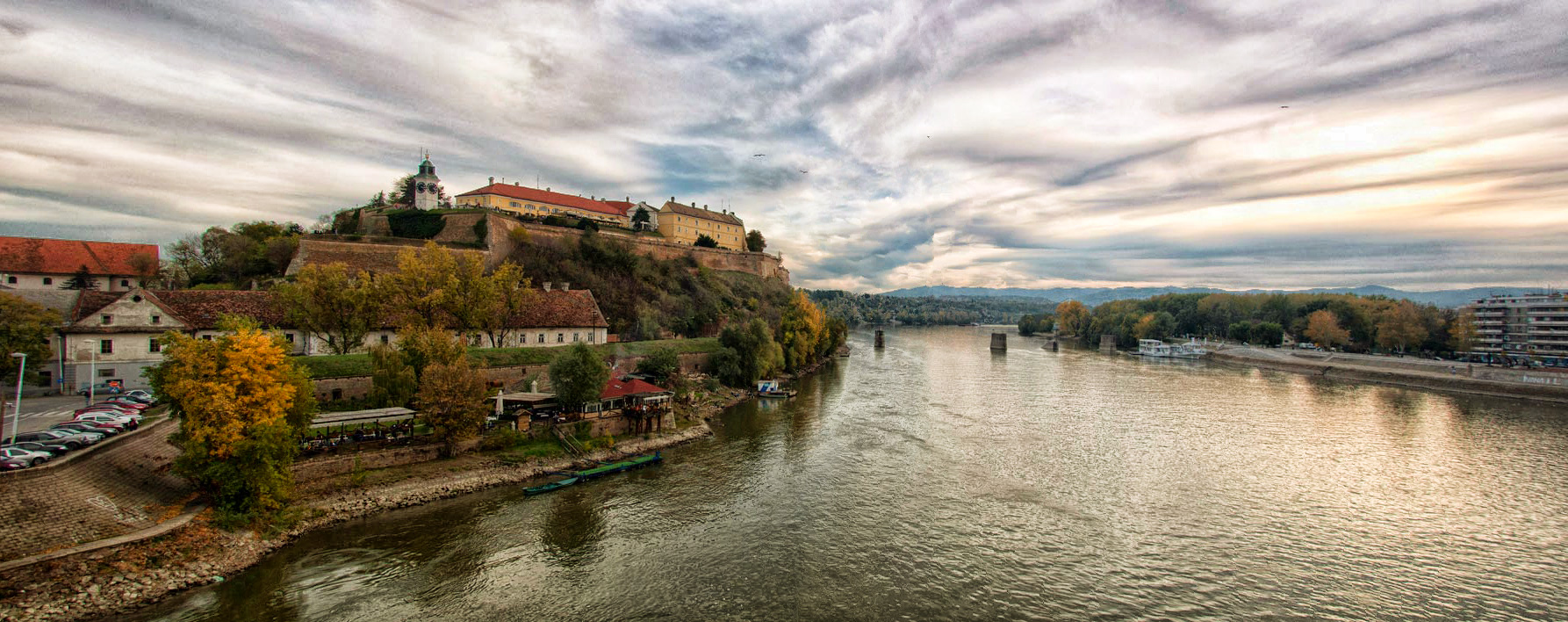
- Images from the South Bačka District

- Location of district in Serbia
- Country: Serbia
- Province: Vojvodina
- Administrative center: Novi Sad

Government
  - Commissioner: Milan Novaković

Area
  - Total: 4,016 km^{2} (1,551 sq mi)

Population (2022)
  - Total: 607,178
  - Density: 151.2/km^{2} (391.6/sq mi)
- ISO 3166 code: RS-06
- Municipalities: 11 and 1 city
- Settlements: 77
- Cities and towns: 16
- Villages: 61
- Website: juznobacki.okrug.gov.rs

The South Bačka District (Serbian: Јужнобачки округ, romanized: Južnobački okrug, pronounced [jûʒnobâːtʃkiː ôkruːɡ]) is one of administrative districts of Serbia. It lies in the southern part of Bačka and northern part of Syrmia. According to the 2022 census, the South Bačka District has a population of 607,178 inhabitants. The administrative center of the district is the city of Novi Sad, which is also the administrative center and the largest city of the Vojvodina.

== History ==
In the 9th century, the area was ruled by the Bulgarian-Slavic duke Salan. From 11th to 16th century, during the administration of the medieval Kingdom of Hungary, the area was mostly part of the Bacsensis County, with small northern parts of it in the Bodrogiensis County and Csongradiensis County. In 1526–27, the area was ruled by the independent Serb ruler, emperor Jovan Nenad, while during Ottoman administration (16th-17th century), it was part of the Sanjak of Segedin.

During Habsburg administration (18th century), the area was divided between the Bodrog County, Batsch County and the Military Frontier. The two counties were joined into single Batsch-Bodrog County in the 18th century. Since the abolishment of the Theiß-Marosch section of the Military Frontier in 1751, part of that territory was also included into Batsch-Bodrog County. The only part of the area that remained within Military Frontier was Šajkaška region. From 1751 to 1848, northeastern part of the area belonged to the autonomous District of Potisje.

In the 1850s, the area was mostly part of the Novi Sad District, with some northern parts in the Sombor District. After 1860, the area was again included into Batsch-Bodrog County (officially Bács-Bodrog County since 1867). In 1873, the Military Frontier in Šajkaška region was abolished and that area was also included into Bács-Bodrog County.

During the royal Serb-Croat-Slovene (Yugoslav) administration (1918–1941), the area was initially a part of the Novi Sad County (1918–1922). Between 1922 and 1929, it was divided between Bačka Oblast and Belgrade Oblast, while from 1929 to 1941 it was part of the Danube Banovina. During the Hungarian-German Axis occupation (1941–1944), the area was included into Bács-Bodrog County.

Since 1944, the area was part of autonomous Yugoslav Vojvodina (which was part of newly established Socialist Republic of Serbia since 1945). The present-day administrative districts of Serbia (including South Bačka District) were established in 1992 by the decree of the Government of Serbia.

== Cities and municipalities ==
The South Bačka District encompasses the territories of one city and eleven municipalities:

- Novi Sad (city)
- Bač (municipality)
- Bačka Palanka (municipality)
- Bački Petrovac (Slovak: Báčsky Petrovec) (municipality)
- Bečej (municipality)
- Beočin (municipality)
- Srbobran (municipality)
- Sremski Karlovci (municipality)
- Temerin (municipality)
- Titel (municipality)
- Vrbas (municipality)
- Žabalj (municipality)

The city of Novi Sad is divided into the municipalities Novi Sad and Petrovaradin.

== Demographics ==
Historical population
Year	Pop.	±% p.a.
1948	358,722	—
1953	377,282	+1.01%
1961	432,873	+1.73%
1971	486,083	+1.17%
1981	538,016	+1.02%
1991	553,027	+0.28%
2002	593,666	+0.65%
2011	615,371	+0.40%
2022	607,178	−0.12%

=== Cities and towns ===
There are seven cities/towns with over 10,000 inhabitants:

- Novi Sad: 325,551^{a}
- Bačka Palanka: 25,476
- Vrbas: 20,892
- Bečej: 19,492
- Temerin: 17,998
- Kać: 11,067
- Srbobran: 10,496

^{a} contiguous urban area (including adjacent settlements of Petrovaradin, Sremska Kamenica, Veternik, and Futog)

=== Ethnic structure ===
Ethnicity	Population	Share
Serbs	446,591	73.5%
Hungarians	35,356	5.8%
Slovaks	19,812	3.2%
Roma	9,989	1.6%
Croats	6,903	1.1%
Montenegrins	6,783	1.1%
Others	30,057	5%
Undeclared/Unknown	51,687	8.5%

There are 9 municipalities with Serb ethnic majority: Titel (85%), Žabalj (82%), Sremski Karlovci (79%), Bačka Palanka (78%), City of Novi Sad (78%), Temerin (70%), Beočin (69%), Srbobran (67%), and Vrbas (62%). Additionally, there are two municipalities with relative Serb ethnic majority: Bač (45%) and Bečej (42%). One municipality has a Slovak ethnic majority: Bački Petrovac (Slovak: Báčsky Petrovec).

== See also ==
- Administrative districts of Serbia
- Administrative divisions of Serbia
