= National Ringette League =

Semi-professional ringette league in Canada

- Current season, competition or edition: 2025-26 NRL season
- Sport: Ringette
- Founded: 2002
- First season: 2004
- Divisions: Western Conference, Eastern Conference
- No. of teams: 14
- Country: Canada
- Most recent champions: Waterloo Wildfire; (2025-26)
- Most titles: Cambridge Turbos (6 times)
- Website: www.nationalringetteleague.ca

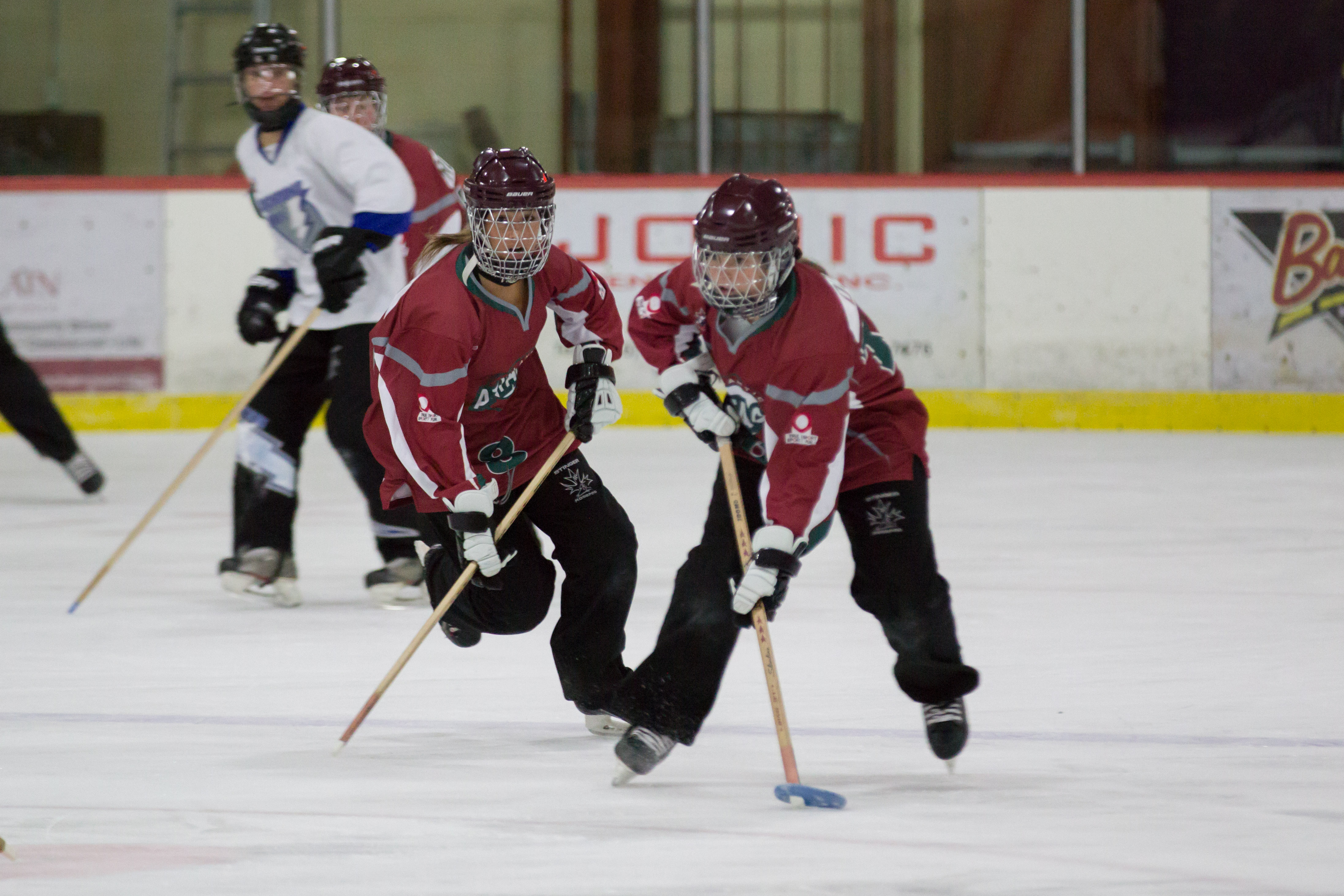
A 2018 game between the Atlantic Attack and Richmond Hill Lightning.

The National Ringette League (NRL) (French: Ligue Nationale de Ringuette, LNR) is the premier league for the sport of ringette in North America and Canada's national league for elite ringette players aged 18 and up. The NRL is not a women's variant of a more well-known men's league or sport like professional women's ice hockey or bandy; one of ringette's distinctive features is that all of its players are girls and women. As such, the NRL is the continent's first and only winter team sports league whose entire athlete roster is made up of women and non-binary athletes.

The NRL is semi-professional and operates as a showcase league for ringette in North America. The league functions as a committee under Ringette Canada, a non-profit sports organization and Canada's national governing body for ringette. Its Finnish equivalent is the SM Ringette league in Finland.

== League history ==
Ringette is a Canadian sport that was first introduced in 1963 in North Bay, Ontario. For ten years, play was confined to Ontario and Quebec; however, the sport spread quickly and is now played by over 30,000 players and involves over 50,000 participants across Canada. The success of the 2002 World Ringette Championships in Edmonton, Alberta, where Canada won the gold medal, sparked the desire to create the National Ringette League. Former Team Canada goaltender, Keely Brown, was a key figure in getting the NRL established. The NRL was founded in 2002 and began play the following year, with November 2004 marking the start of its official inaugural season. The first NRL season included seventeen teams in three cross-country divisions.

The National Ringette League playoffs at the Canadian Ringette Championships (CRC) began in 2008 when they replaced the national championships for Under-19 years and Open divisions. Playoffs are held annually at CRCs to determine an annual league champion. Historically, they consisted of knockout matches, round robins, and tournaments in various cities, but currently the tournament takes place in just one city. The winning National Ringette League team is awarded with the Jeanne Sauvé Memorial Cup, named after Canada's first female Governor General.

A 2009 episode of Rick Mercer Report called "Ringette Night In Canada" featured the NRL's Cambridge Turbos. In 2013, Télé Québec broadcast a short documentary film titled 'Tout le monde dehors – La Ringuette', which focused on the NRL's Gatineau Fusion, along with Yvon Brault, who devotes his life to this sport. In 2025, the documentary "Sisters of the Ring" was released, focusing on the 4 Snowdon sisters, all of whom play or have played for the Atlantic Attack.

== Structure and competition ==
Teams compete in two conferences: the Western Conference, which consists of teams from British Columbia, Alberta, Saskatchewan, and Manitoba, and the Eastern Conference and includes teams from Ontario, Quebec, and Atlantic Canada. Currently the league operates based on hub-style tournaments, and a team can expect to host 1–2 such tournaments a season, while traveling for an additional 4–5. NRL games are divided into four 13-minute periods.

Characteristic of North American sports, the NRL is a closed league with no relegation. There is an annual draft in between seasons, which is the main entry for new players in the league. The NRL runs four regional drafts; in 2011, there was one for the region of Ottawa and Gatineau, another one for Manitoba, another for Southern Ontario, and another for the Montreal region. Trading among teams is also common.

Some players are selected from the league to help form Canada's national ringette teams, while the league also draws some international players, especially from Finland. In some cases, players have been traded between clubs in Canada's NRL to Ringette Finland's semi-professional ringette league, SM Ringette (formerly called Ringeten SM-sarja), and vice versa.

The NRL maintains a collaboration with the lower Ringette leagues in regards to the development of the young female players, therefore several teams of the NRL have affiliated development teams for Under 19 years old and Under 16 years old. The Canadian Ringette Championships for U16 and U19 takes place in the same place as the NRL playoff tournament elimination. It is this tournament which allows the tracers and talent scouts for the NRL teams to identify emerging young athletes as potential future NRL players.

In 2008, the budget of each NRL team varied between $15,000 and $20000. The teams and the league contribute to cover all the transport spending, accommodation, and rent of arenas. The players must find their own financiers to pay for their equipment and personal spending and the players are not paid for play.

=== Background ===
Over thirty different teams have competed in the NRL since it began in 2004. For the 2021–22 season, there were 12 teams playing in a hub format, down from 15 teams from the previous year, due to COVID-19. The Cambridge Turbos have won the most NRL titles. The Lower Mainland Thunder in British Columbia and the Ottawa Ice in Ontario are the only now-defunct NRL teams in league history to have won a Canadian Ringette Championship along with the Jeanne Sauvé Memorial Cup, and the league's national championship gold medal. The LMRL Thunder won in 2011–12, and the Ottawa Ice won the league title in 2013–14. Both the LMRL Thunder and the Ottawa Ice won the NRL championship once in their team's history while their clubs were active.

For the 2005–06 season, the league had 19 teams competing in four divisions. The Eastern Conference in 2005–06 included the Ontario and Québec divisions. Ontario teams included the Cambridge Turbos, Gloucester Devils, Ottawa Ice, Richmond Hill Lightning and Waterloo Wildfire. The Ottawa Ice was an expansion team. The Québec division included the BLL Nordiques (who later became the Bourassa Royal) the Cyclones de Québec, the Montreal Mission, and Rive–Sud Revolution, all returning from the previous season. Teams in the Central Division included the APFG Sixers, BoniVital Angels, Eastman Flames, Hix with Stix, and Manitoba Moose. The Western Division included the returning league champion, the Edmonton WAM!, the Calgary RATH, BC Reign, the Saskatoon Wild, and the previous year's wild card team, the Edmonton Edge. With nineteen teams competing, it was this NRL season which recorded the highest number of teams competing in the NRL in a single season in league history. The 2005–06 NRL season also marked the inaugural season of the NRL Championship.

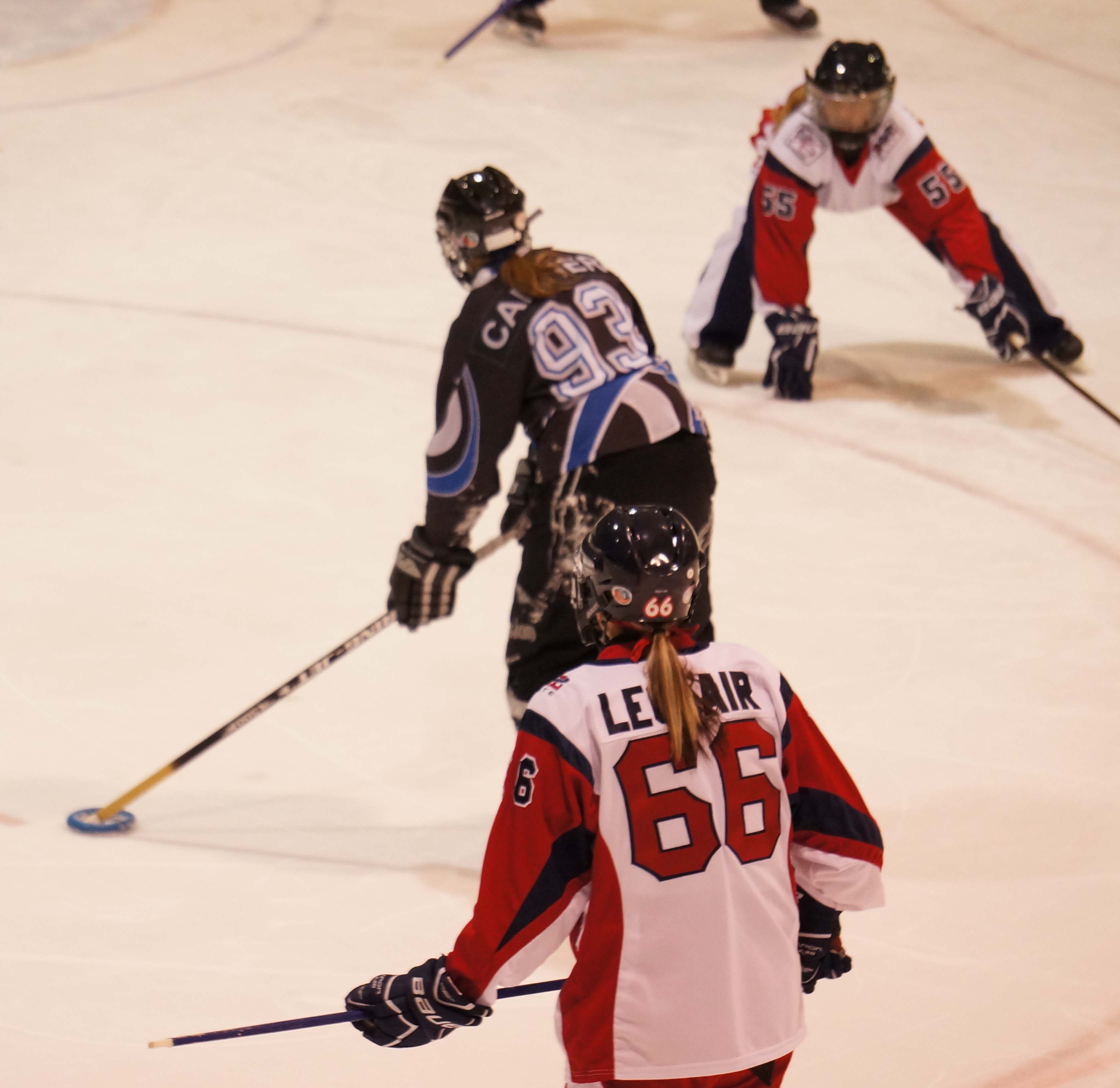
A Montreal Mission player taking a free pass

=== NRL National Championship format ===
The NRL Championship, which crowns the team champion of the league, is played annually by the eight best teams in the league at the Canadian Ringette Championships in the National Ringette League division.

==== History ====
In 2010–11, the introduction of a new NRL Championship Tournament replaced the Championship qualifying rounds. The tournament took place in just one city. The format was intended to allow the league to create a media event and to hold attention. The top ten teams in the regular season of the league participated in the tournament.

Starting in 2011–12, eight teams play a full round robin to determine the champion, also called the Elite Eight.

=== Ringette World Club Championship ===
Two editions of the Ringette World Club Championship (RWCC) were held, featuring six teams, four from Canada and two from Finland. The 2008 edition was held in Sault-Ste-Marie, Ontario, featuring 6 teams, four from Canada and two from Finland. The Cambridge Turbos beat Luvian Kiekko - 82 in the final. Three years late in 2011, the event was held in Finland. Six teams competed, three from Finland, two from Canada and one from Sweden. The Finns dominated on home soil, sweeping the medal podium, with Lapinlahden Luistin -89 winning the championship. A third edition was planned for 2014, but was cancelled due to lack of funds. No further international club competitions have taken place.

== Awards and honours ==
=== Jeanne Sauvé Memorial Cup ===
The final competition for the National Ringette League is held annually at the Canadian Ringette Championships. The Jeanne Sauvé Memorial Cup is the championship trophy awarded annually to the winning team in the National Ringette League. Initially coined the "Jeanne Sauvé Cup", and initiated in December 1984, it was first presented at the 1985 Canadian Ringette Championships in Dollard-des-Ormeaux, Québec.

=== NRL Annual Award nominees ===
At the end of March, during the week break before the National Ringette League Championships, the League names its annuals Award Nominees. Award winners are announced at the closing banquet of the Canadian Ringette Championships. The awards program recognizes the performance of NRL athletes during regular season play with trophies for:

- Rookie of the Year
- Most Valuable Player
- Top Forward
- Top Centre
- Top Defence
- Top Goalkeeper
- Coaching Staff of the Year
- NRL Top Scorer

== Teams ==
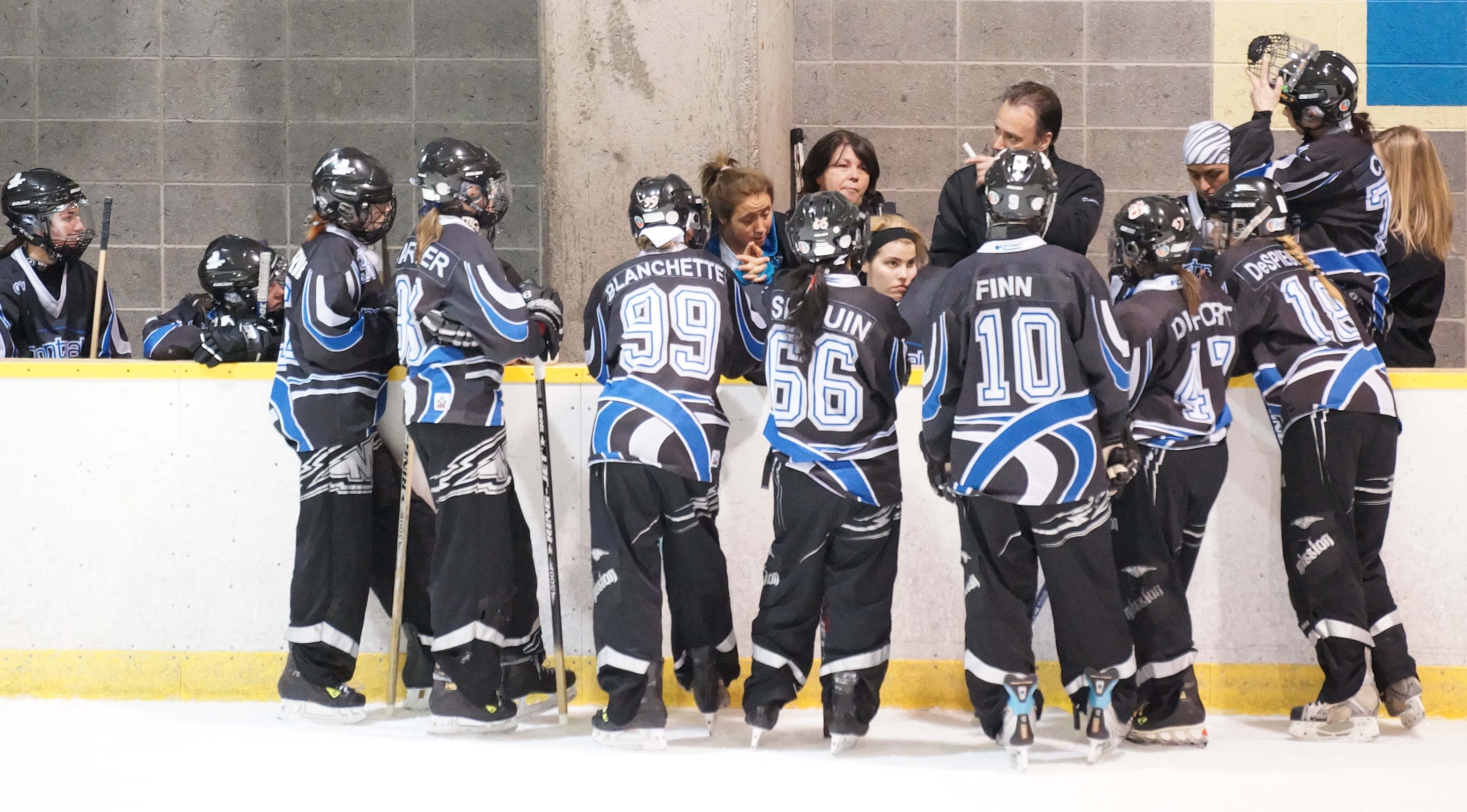
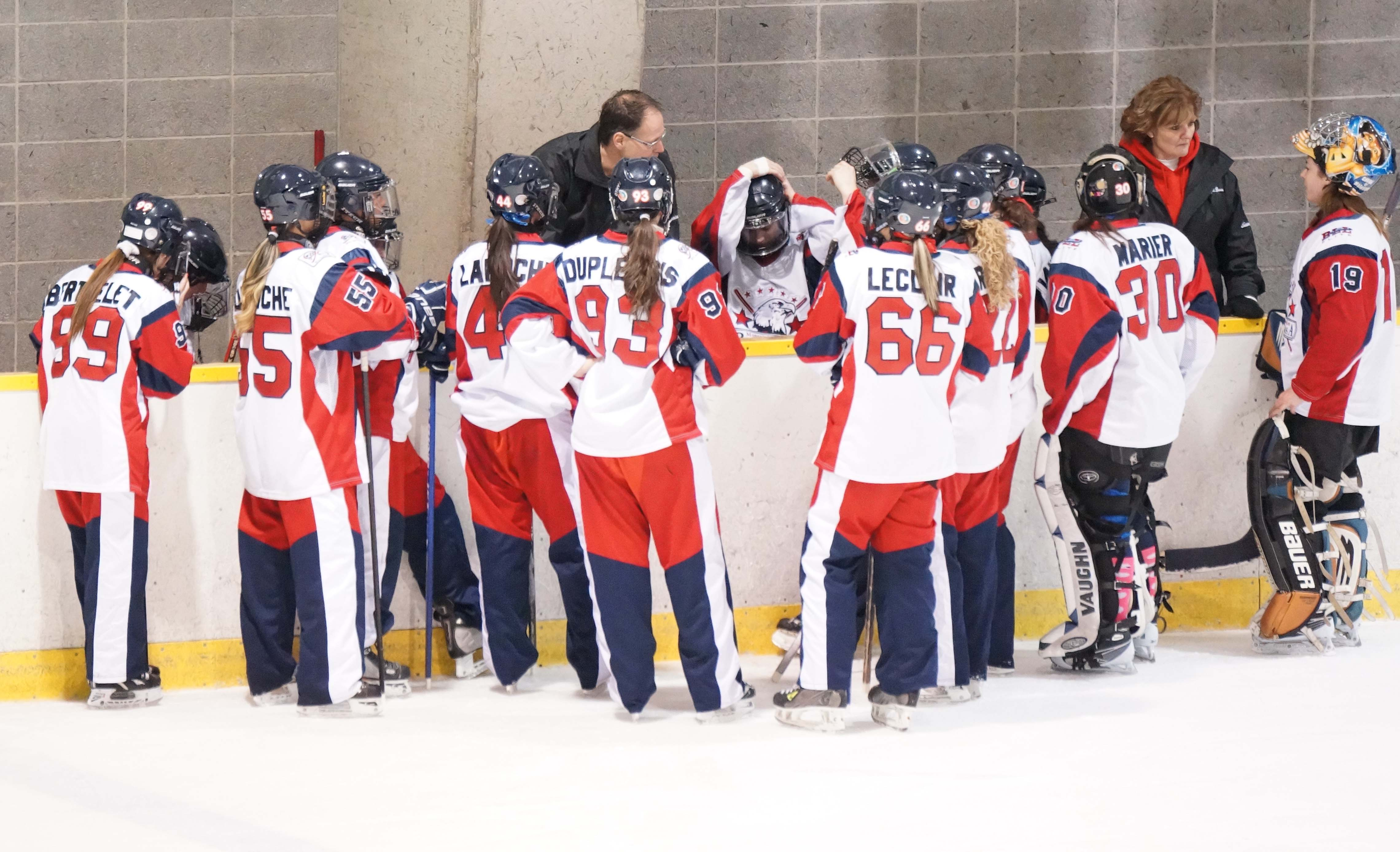
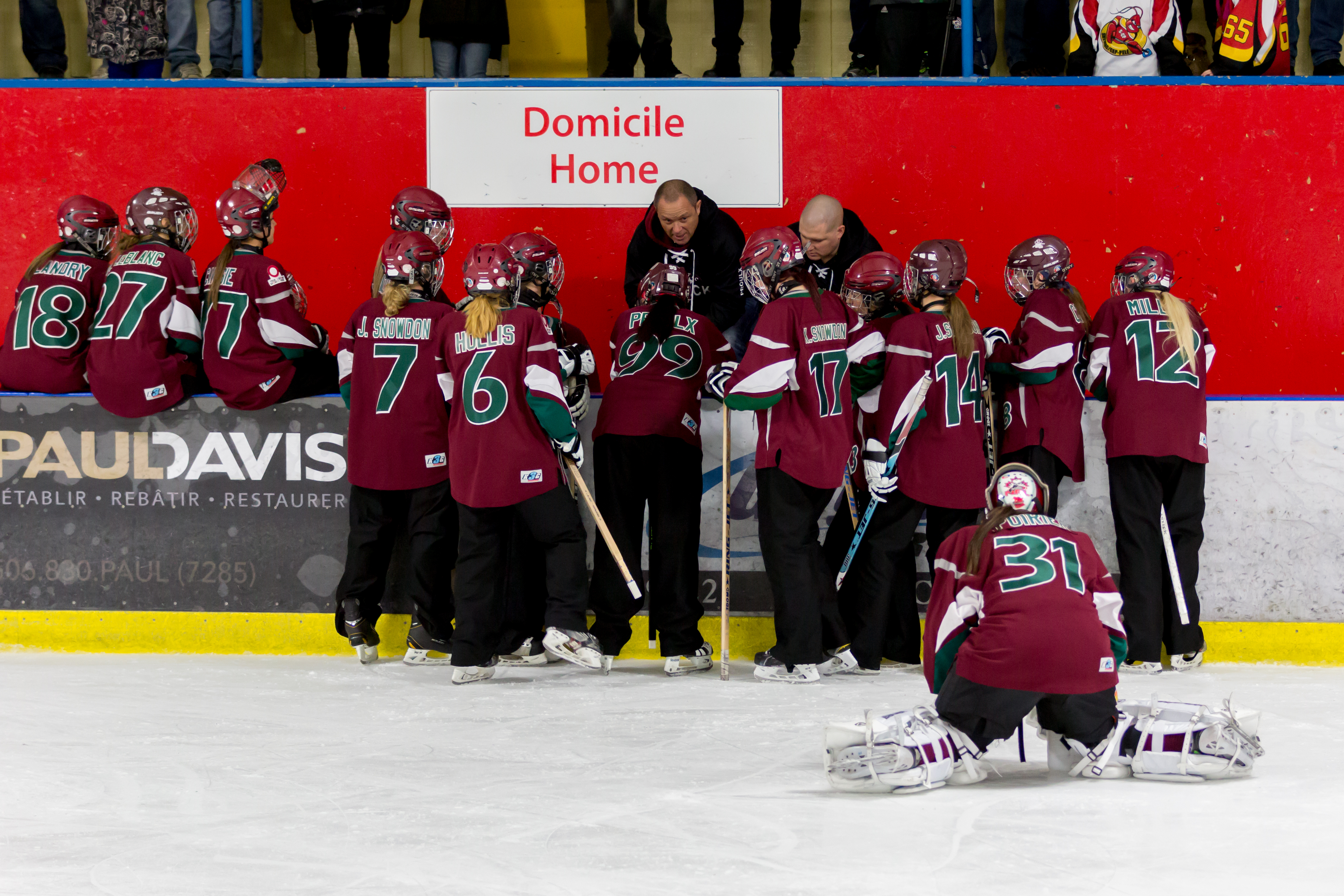
Top left: Montreal Mission in 2012.
Top right: Bourassa Royal in 2012.
Bottom: Atlantic Attack in 2016.

As of the 2025-26 season, there are 14 teams in the NRL, all of them based in Canada. The number of teams in the NRL can vary from season to season, as new teams may be added or existing teams may withdraw.

=== Current teams ===
2024–25 NRL team locations (Western Conference teams in blue, Eastern Conference teams in red and pink

2025–26 NRL Teams (14 teams)
Team	City/Area	Founded	Cups	G	S	B
Western Conference
BC Thunder	British Columbia	2011	1	1	1	0
Rocky Mountain Rage	Cochrane, Alberta	2025	0	0	0	0
Edmonton Black Gold Rush	Edmonton, Alberta	2015	0	0	0	0
Calgary RATH	Calgary, Alberta	2007	3	3	2	2
Edmonton WAM!	Edmonton, Alberta	2004	5	5	4	2
Manitoba Herd	Winnipeg, Manitoba	2021	0	0	0	0
Saskatchewan Heat	Saskatoon, Saskatchewan	2021	0	0	0	0
Eastern Conference
Gatineau Fusion	Gatineau, Quebec	2008	0	0	0	0
Cambridge Turbos	Cambridge, Ontario	2003	6	6	3	4
Waterloo Wildfire	Waterloo, Ontario	2004	1	1	0	3
Eastern Ontario Capitals	Ottawa, Ontario	2025	0	0	0	0
Atlantic Attack	Cocagne, New Brunswick	2011	1	1	2	0
Montréal Mission	Montréal, Quebec	2004	1	1	2	1
Rive-Sud Révolution	South Shore, Quebec	2004	0	0	0	2
Former NRL Teams
Ottawa Ice	Ottawa, Ontario	2005	1	1	0	2
Gloucester Devils	Gloucester, Ontario	2004	0	0	1	0
Winnipeg Prairie Fire	Winnipeg, Manitoba	2006	0	0	1	1
Richmond Hill Lightning	Richmond Hill, Ontario	2006	0	0	0	0
LMRL Thunder	British Columbia	2011	1	1	0	0

=== Western Conference ===
==== Edmonton Black Gold Rush ====
Edmonton Black Gold Rush
- Nickname: Rushies
- City: Edmonton, Alberta
- League: National Ringette League
- Conference: Western
- Division: Western
- Founded: 2015; 11 years ago
- Colours: grey, gold, black, red
- Website: NRLRush.ca

Franchise history
- 2015 to present: Edmonton Black Gold Rush (NRL)

Championships
- Playoff championships: Canadian Ringette Championships (NRL):

The Edmonton Black Gold Rush (commonly called "The Rush" or "Rushies") is a ringette team in the National Ringette League (NRL) based in Edmonton, Alberta. The team competes in the NRL Western Conference and was founded in 2015.

The following is the Rush roster for the 2022–23 season.

Edmonton Black Gold Rush 2022–23
No	Player	Position
	Victtoria Barbieri	
	Danielle Bechard	
	Brooklyn Bilyk	
	Kaley Bilyk	
	Molly Chorney	
	Kat Eamon	
	Sydney George	
	Annie Hood	
	Justine Kearney	
	Nicole Pelletier	
	Reid Petersen	
	Jordyn Scoot	
	Reeve Spanakis	
	Jamie Tuininga	
	Jordyn Vandenbrand	
	Paytyn Wood	

=== Eastern Conference ===
==== Waterloo Wildfire ====
Waterloo Wildfire
- City: Waterloo, Ontario
- League: National Ringette League
- Conference: Eastern
- Division: Red
- Founded
- Colours: black, white, yellow, red, />
- Website: NRLWaterlooRingette.com

Championships
- Playoff championships: Canadian Ringette Championships (NRL):

The Waterloo Wildfire is a ringette team in the National Ringette League (NRL) based in Waterloo, Ontario. The team competes in the NRL Eastern Conference in the Red Division.

The following is the Wildfire's roster for the 2022–23 season.

Waterloo Wildfire 2022–23
No	Player	Position
	Elyssa Perron (AP/GUEST)	
	Emily Sharpe (AP/GUEST)	
	Katie Bray (AP/GUEST)	
	Brooklyn Norris (AP/GUEST)	
	Isabel Lorentz (AP/GUEST)	
2	Maddie MacLean	
4	Jackie Gaudet	
5	Emma Heaney	
6	Jordan McClement (Rookie)	
7	Lydia Duncan	
8	Meghan Hanton-Fong	
9	Erin Markle	
10	Erika Kiviaho	
12	Sydney Granger	
16	Tatum Allen	
17	Laura Dayman	
18	Megan Heaney (Rookie)	
23	Kelsey Youldon	
24	Brianna Jacobi (Rookie)	
25	Emily Power	
29	Camrynn Schnarr	

==== Nepean Ravens ====
Nepean Ravens
- City: Nepean, Ontario
- League: NRL
- Conference: Eastern
- Division: Red Division
- Founded: 2021; 5 years ago
- Colours: Blue, white, black
Home colours	Away colours

Franchise history
- 2021 to present: Nepean Ravens (NRL)

Current uniform
- NationalRingetteLeague.ca

The Nepean Ravens is a ringette team in the National Ringette League (NRL) based in Nepean, Ontario (Ottawa). The team competes in the NRL Eastern Conference in the Red Division and was founded in 2021.

The following is the Ravens roster for the 2022–23 season.

Nepean Ravens 2022–23
No	Player	Position
	K Gagnier (AP/GUEST)	
	T forrest (AP/GUEST)	
	R Steckly (AP/GUEST)	
	J Wilson (AP/GUEST)	
2	Amanda Law (Rookie)	Defence
3	C Chestnut (AP/GUEST)	
4	Olivia Edissi	Defence
5	Laiya Evraire (Rookie)	Forward
9	Josiane Labelle (Rookie)	Forward
11	Allison Biewald	Forward
12	Amanda Gour	Defence
13	Samantha Jones	Defence
14	Molly Lewis	Forward
16	Brooke Wasylyshyn (Rookie)	Forward
17	Emma Kelly	Forward
19	Jalena Marelic	Forward
21	Rebecca Bastien	Defence
23	Abby Manson	Forward
25	Alyssa Wong (Rookie)	Defence
30	Rachael Pelisek	Goalie
32	E Harvie (AP/GUEST)	Goalie

==== Gatineau Fusion ====
Gatineau Fusion
- City: Gatineau, Quebec
- League: National Ringette League
- Conference: Eastern
- Division: Red
- Founded: 2008; 18 years ago
- Colours: white, blue, black,
- Website: NationalRingetteLeague.ca

Championships
- Playoff championships: Canadian Ringette Championships (NRL):

The Gatineau Fusion is a ringette team in the National Ringette League (NRL) based in Gatineau, Quebec. The team competes in the NRL Eastern Conference in the Red Division and was founded in 2008.

The following is the Fusion's roster for the 2022–23 season.

Gatineau Fusion 2022–23
No	Player	Position
5	Amy Whyte (Rookie)	Defence
6	Amanda Moisan	Forward
7	Émily Chénier	Forward
9	Heidi Wippel	Defence
10	Jasmine Menard	Forward
13	Mariane-Alexandra Fraser	Defence
15	Camdyn Wilson (Rookie)	Forward
17	Jennifer Hartley	Forward
18	Cassandra Duquette	Defence
20	Danika Osborne (Rookie)	Forward
21	Taylor Maisonneuve	Defence
26	Sophie Chenier	Forward
27	Sara Plouffe	Forward
28	Julie Vandal	Defence
32	Gabrielle Ednie	Goalie
33	Stéphanie Caron	Goalie
61	Alexann Legault	Forward
66	Maxim Moisan (Rookie)	Forward
71	Véronique Laurin	Goalie
74	Alex Violette (AP/GUEST)	Forward
91	Chantal St-Laurent	Forward

==== Rive-Sud Révolution ====
Rive-Sud Révolution
- City: Montérégie, Québec
- League: National Ringette League
- Conference: Eastern
- Division: White
- Founded: 2004; 22 years ago
- Colours: black, orange-red, grey
- Affiliate: U19 South Shore Revolution
- Website: NationalRingetteLeague.ca

Franchise history
- 2004 to present: Rive–Sud Révolution (NRL)

The Rive-Sud Révolution, ("South Shore Revolution" in English), is a ringette team in the National Ringette League (NRL) based in Montérégie, the southwestern part of Québec. The Revolution competes in the NRL Eastern Conference in the White Division and was founded in 2004. The Revolution is one of the oldest teams in the NRL.

The team's home arena is in Québec and its headquarters are located in South Shore, Montreal. The South Shore is located within the Quebec administrative region of Montérégie. Its team affiliate is the U19 South Shore Revolution.

The Revolution began competing for their 16th year as a club during the NRL 2022–23 season. The following is the Révolution's roster for the 2022–23 season.

Rive-Sud Révolution 2022–23
No	Player	Position
	Évelyne Martel	
	Eléonore Sezia	
4	Erin Gaudet	Defence
5	A Carrier (AP/GUEST)	
7	Camille Dumont	Defence
8	Audrey Vachon	Forward
9	Laurence Larocque	Centre
10	Ariane Sagala	Forward
11	Emilie Cunial	Defence
12	Sarah Bernard-Lacaille	Defence
19	Caroline Viola (Rookie)	Forward
20	Lauriane Alain (Rookie)	Defence
21	Chloé Marcoux (AP/GUEST)	
22	Élodie Bourke (AP/GUEST)	
25	Brittany Lanouette (Rookie)	Forward
26	Laurianne Bourke	Defence
28	M Marcoux (AP/GUEST)	
29	Sabrina St-Pierre (AP/GUEST)	
30	Evelyne Martel	Goalie
31	Laurie St-Pierre	Goalie
77	Eleonore Sezia (Rookie)	Forward
88	Mélissa Demers (AP/GUEST)	
91	Audrey-Anne Plante	Forward
93	C Cartier (AP/GUEST)	Forward
96	Alex Raymond-Couturier	Centre
97	Laurence Lacombe (Rookie)	Forward
99	Camille Lavoie	Centre

Rive-Sud Révolution players have competed for the Canada national ringette team at the World Ringette Championships (WRC) and are listed in the table below.

Year	Team	Player
2007	2007 Team Canada	Julie Primard
2010	2010 Team Canada	Julie Primard
2013	2013 Team Canada Senior	Julie Primard

== National Ringette League champions ==
National Ringette League (NRL) champions compete annually at the Canadian Ringette Championships at the end of the NRL season. The 2019–20 and 2020–21 seasons were cancelled due to the COVID-19 pandemic. The Cambridge Turbos, who have been in the league since its inception, lead the championship tally with 6, followed by the Edmonton WAM! with 5 and Calgary with 3.

=== List of NRL champions by season ===
List of Jeanne Sauvé Memorial Cup winners at the Canadian Ringette Championships:

- 2025-26 - Waterloo Wildfire
- 2024-25 - Montreal Mission
- 2023–24 – Edmonton WAM!
- 2022–23 – Edmonton WAM!
- 2021–22 – Calgary RATH
- 2020–21 – Not held due to COVID-19 pandemic
- 2019–20 – Not held due to COVID-19 pandemic
- 2018–19 – Calgary RATH
- 2017–18 – Atlantic Attack
- 2016–17 – Cambridge Turbos
- 2015–16 – Cambridge Turbos
- 2014–15 – Cambridge Turbos
- 2013–14 – Ottawa Ice
- 2012–13 – Calgary Rath
- 2011–12 – LMRL Thunder
- 2010–11 – Edmonton WAM!
- 2009–10 – Edmonton WAM!
- 2008–09 – Cambridge Turbos
- 2007–08 – Cambridge Turbos
- 2006–07 – Edmonton WAM!
- 2005–06 – Cambridge Turbos
- 2004–05 – No championship match

=== Total Championships ===
1. Cambridge Turbos - 6
2. Edmonton WAM! - 5
3. Calgary RATH - 3
4. BC/LMRL Thunder - 1
5. Atlantic Attack - 1
6. Ottawa Ice - 1
7. Montreal Mission - 1
8. Waterloo Wildfire - 1

=== NRL final standings season by season ===
The table below provides a chronological list of Jeanne Sauvé Memorial Cup winners at the Canadian Ringette Championships and the NRL's teams who won the gold, silver, and bronze medals.

National Ringette League Champions 2003–2023
Season	Location	Gold	Silver	Bronze
2003–04 (CRC Open)	Calgary	Alberta	Ontario Wild Card	Manitoba
2004–05 (CRC Open)	Winnipeg	Alberta	Ontario	Ontario Wild Card
2005–06 (CRC Open)	Longueuil	Cambridge Turbos (Ontario)	Alberta	Quebec
2006–07 (CRC Open)	Halifax	Edmonton WAM! (Alberta)	Western Wild Card	Ontario
National Ringette League division established
2007–08	St. Albert	Cambridge Turbos	Montreal Mission	Calgary RATH
2008–09	Charlottetown	Cambridge Turbos	Edmonton WAM!	Montreal Mission
2009–10	Saskatoon	Edmonton WAM!	Cambridge Turbos	Winnipeg Prairie Fire
2010–11	Cambridge	Edmonton WAM!	Cambridge Turbos	Calgary RATH
2011–12	Burnaby	LMRL Thunder (Lower Mainland Ringette League)	Montreal Mission	Ottawa Ice
2012–13	Fredericton	Calgary RATH	Winnipeg Prairie Fire	Cambridge Turbos
2013–14	Regina	Ottawa Ice	Cambridge Turbos	Edmonton WAM!
2014–15	Wood Buffalo	Cambridge Turbos	Richmond Hill Lightning	Edmonton WAM!
2015–16	London	Cambridge Turbos	Gloucester Devils	Ottawa Ice
2016–17	Leduc	Cambridge Turbos	Atlantic Attack	Waterloo Wildfire
2017–18	Winnipeg	Atlantic Attack	Edmonton WAM!	Cambridge Turbos
2018–19	Charlottetown and Summerside	Calgary RATH	Atlantic Attack	Cambridge Turbos
2019–20	Cancelled due to COVID-19 pandemic			
2020–21	Cancelled due to COVID-19 pandemic			
2021–22	Calgary	Calgary RATH	Edmonton WAM!	Cambridge Turbos
2022–23	Regina	Edmonton WAM!	Montreal Mission	Calgary RATH
2023–24	Dieppe	Edmonton WAM!	Calgary RATH	Waterloo Wildfire

=== NRL complete final standings ===
2003–04

The 2003–04 NRL season marked the National Ringette League's inaugural year with 17 teams competing across Canada. The competition was referred to as the "Open Division" and took place in Waterloo, Ontario.

2003–04 National Ringette League season
Number of teams	Season champions
17	Alberta
Place	Team
1st place, gold medalist(s)	Alberta
2nd place, silver medalist(s)	Ontario Wild Card
3rd place, bronze medalist(s)	Manitoba
4th	Quebec
5th	British Columbia
6th	Saskatchewan (Saskatoon Wild)
7th	(Ontario) Waterloo (host)

2004–05

There wasn't an NRL championship for the 2004–05 NRL season but a competition took place at the Canadian Ringette Championships in Calgary, Alberta for the Open division.

2005–06

The 2005–06 season marked the NRL's second season with 19 teams competing and two new teams joined the league, one of which was the Ottawa Ice. These teams were distributed in four conferences: the West Conference (five teams), Central Conference (five teams), Ontario Conference (five teams), and Quebec Conference (four teams). The dominant teams were the Cambridge Turbos in the Ontario Conference, Montreal Mission in the Quebec Conference, Edmonton WAM! in the West Conference, and the champions of the Central Division, the APFG Sixers (Assiniboine Park/Fort Garry, an AA provincial team from Manitoba).

The 2005–06 NRL season finals took place at the 2006 Canadian Ringette Championships in Longueuil, Quebec. The championship match of the NRL/LNR took place in the Centre Étienne Desmarteau in Montreal, on April 1, 2006, and was won by the Cambridge Turbos.

During the off-season three teams folded citing low attendance revenue.

2005–06 National Ringette League season
Number of teams	Season champions
19	Cambridge Turbos
Place	Team
1st place, gold medalist(s)	Cambridge Turbos (Ontario)
2nd place, silver medalist(s)	Alberta
3rd place, bronze medalist(s)	Quebec
4th	Ontario Wild Card
5th	Manitoba
6th	West Wild Card
7th	Host
8th	(Quebec) Québec Wild Card
9th	Saskatchewan (Saskatoon Wild)
10th	British Columbia

2006–07

In 2006–07, the NRL entered its third season and consisted of 16 teams distributed in three conferences: the West Conference (seven teams), Ontario Conference (five teams), and Quebec Conference (four teams). The 2006–07 NRL Championship finals were played as the "Open Division" at the 2007 Canadian Ringette Championships in Halifax, Nova Scotia. The Championship final match took place in on April 10, 2007, and was won by the Edmonton WAM!.

2006–07 National Ringette League season
Number of teams	Season champions
16	Edmonton WAM!
Place	Team
1st place, gold medalist(s)	(Alberta) Edmonton WAM!
2nd place, silver medalist(s)	Western Wild Card
3rd place, bronze medalist(s)	Ontario
4th	Quebec Wild Card
5th	Manitoba
6th	Ontario Wild Card
7th	British Columbia
8th	Quebec
9th	Saskatchewan (Saskatoon Wild)
10th	Nova Scotia

2007–08

In 2007–08, seventeen teams competed in two conferences. The Western Conference included seven teams and the Eastern Conference included ten teams. The Cambridge Turbos won the NRL Championship by beating the Montreal Mission 2–1 in overtime.

The 2007–08 NRL Championship finals were played at the 2008 Canadian Ringette Championships in St. Albert, Alberta.

2007–08 National Ringette League season
Number of teams	Season champions
17	Cambridge Turbos
Place	Team
1st place, gold medalist(s)	(Ontario) Cambridge Turbos
2nd place, silver medalist(s)	(Quebec) Montreal Mission
3rd place, bronze medalist(s)	(Alberta) Calgary RATH
4th	(Alberta) Edmonton WAM!
5th	(Alberta) Edmonton Edge
6th	Manitoba Jets
7th	(Ontario) Richmond Hill Lightning
8th	(Ontario) Gloucester Devils
9th	(British Columbia) BC Reign
10th	Atlantic Sixers

2008–09

In 2008–09, the NRL consisted of eighteen teams grouped in a Western Conference with six teams and an Eastern Conference with twelve teams. The 2008–09 NRL season final took place at the 2009 Canadian Ringette Championships in Charlottetown, PEI, with the Cambridge Turbos finishing in first place.

Also in 2008, the first Ringette World Club Championship was held in Sault Ste. Marie, Ontario. Four NRL teams faced two teams from the Finland's elite ringette league, Ringeten SM-sarja, now known as "SM–Ringette". The Cambridge Turbos won the world title having overcome in the Finnish champion team, Luvian Kiekko −82, in the final.

2008–09 National Ringette League season
Number of teams	Season champions
18	Cambridge Turbos
Place	Team
1st place, gold medalist(s)	(Ontario) Cambridge Turbos
2nd place, silver medalist(s)	(Alberta) Edmonton WAM!
3rd place, bronze medalist(s)	(Quebec) Montreal Mission
4th	(Alberta) Calgary RATH
5th	(Ontario) Ottawa Ice
6th	(Manitoba) Prairie Fire
7th	(Quebec) Rive-Sud Révolution
8th	(Ontario) Waterloo Wildfire
9th	Cyclones de Quebec
10th	(New Brunswick) Atlantic Attack

2009–10

In the 2009–10 season, the National Ringette League for its sixth season with eighteen teams competing. The league consisted of a Western Conference with six teams and an Eastern Conference with twelve teams. The NRL playoffs took place in Saskatoon, Saskatchewan, during the Canadian Ringette Championships. The Edmonton WAM! became the NRL champions again after being eclipsed for two years by the Cambridge Turbos. Edmonton beat Cambridge 2–0 in the NRL league division final.

2009–10 National Ringette League season
Number of teams	Season champions
18	Edmonton WAM!
Place	Team
1st place, gold medalist(s)	(Alberta) Edmonton WAM!
2nd place, silver medalist(s)	(Ontario) Cambridge Turbos
3rd place, bronze medalist(s)	(Manitoba) Prairie Fire
4th	(Alberta) Calgary RATH
5th	(Ontario) Ottawa Ice
6th	(Saskatchewan) Saskatoon Wild
7th	(Ontario) Waterloo Wildfire
8th	(Quebec) Montreal Mission
9th	(Ontario) Gloucester Devils
10th	Atlantic Sixers

2010–11

The 2010–11 NRL Championship finals were played at the 2011 Canadian Ringette Championships in Cambridge, Ontario between March 27, 2011, and April 2, 2011. In the final game of the NRL's league division, the Edmonton WAM! triumphed over the Cambridge Turbos.

2009–10 National Ringette League season
Number of teams	Season champions
	Edmonton WAM!
Place	Team
1st place, gold medalist(s)	(Alberta) Edmonton WAM!
2nd place, silver medalist(s)	(Ontario) Cambridge Turbos
3rd place, bronze medalist(s)	(Alberta) Calgary RATH
4th	(Manitoba) Prairie Fire
5th	(Ontario) Richmond Hill Lightning
6th	(Ontario) Ottawa Ice
7th	(Quebec) Montreal Mission
8th	Cyclones de Quebec
9th	(New Brunswick) Atlantic Attack
10th	(Ontario) Gloucester Devils

2011–12

In the 2011–12 season, the NRL entered its eighth season with nineteen teams playing in two conferences. The 2011–12 NRL Championship finals were played at the 2012 Canadian Ringette Championships in Burnaby, British Columbia.

The NRL experienced a new expansion during the 2011–12 season, with the creation of two new teams, the Atlantic Attack (of Moncton in New Brunswick) and Lower Mainland Thunder (of British Columbia).

The 2011–12 regular season began on October 15, 2011, and concluded on March 18, 2012. All in all, thirty matches were contested by each of the teams during the regular season. Each of the teams only faced teams within their own conference. This structure allowed teams to reduce the costs of transport given the size of the Canadian territory covered by the league. At the end of the regular season, there is a break of a week when the various individual distinctions are awarded, then a National Ringette League Championship Tournament. This is the year the Elite Eight began.

2011–12 National Ringette League season
Number of teams	Season champions
19	LMRL Thunder (Lower Mainland Ringette League)
Place	Team
1st place, gold medalist(s)	(British Columbia) LMRL Thunder (Lower Mainland Ringette League)
2nd place, silver medalist(s)	(Quebec) Montreal Mission
3rd place, bronze medalist(s)	(Ontario) Ottawa Ice
4th	(Ontario) Cambridge Turbos
5th	(Alberta) Calgary RATH
6th	(Ontario) Richmond Hill Lightning
7th	(Manitoba) Prairie Fire
8th	Manitoba Jets

2012–13

The 2012–13 NRL Championship finals were played at the 2013 Canadian Ringette Championships in Fredericton, New Brunswick.

2012–13 National Ringette League season
Number of teams	Season champions
?	Calgary RATH
Place	Team
1st place, gold medalist(s)	(Alberta) Calgary RATH
2nd place, silver medalist(s)	Manitoba Prairie Fire
3rd place, bronze medalist(s)	(Ontario) Cambridge Turbos
4th	(British Columbia) BC Thunder
5th	(Ontario) Gloucester Devils
6th	(Quebec) Montreal Mission
7th	(Ontario) Richmond Hill Lightning
8th	(New Brunswick) Atlantic Attack

2013–14

The 2013–14 NRL Championship finals were played at the 2014 Canadian Ringette Championships in Regina, Saskatchewan.

2013–14 National Ringette League season
Number of teams	Season champions
13	Ottawa Ice
	Team
1st place, gold medalist(s)	(Ontario) Ottawa Ice
2nd place, silver medalist(s)	(Ontario) Cambridge Turbos
3rd place, bronze medalist(s)	(Alberta) Edmonton WAM!
4th	(Ontario) Richmond Hill Lightning
5th	(Alberta) Calgary RATH
6th	(Quebec) Montreal Mission
7th	(Ontario) Gloucester Devils
8th	(Ontario) Waterloo Wildfire

2014–15

The 2014–15 NRL Championship finals were played at the 2015 Canadian Ringette Championships in Wood Buffalo, Alberta. The season's winners were the Cambridge Turbos, runners-up were the Richmond Hill Lightning, and the Edmonton WAM! finished in third.

2014–15 National Ringette League season
Number of teams	Season champions
14	Cambridge Turbos
Place	Team
1st place, gold medalist(s)	(Ontario) Cambridge Turbos
2nd place, silver medalist(s)	(Ontario) Richmond Hill Lightning
3rd place, bronze medalist(s)	(Alberta) Edmonton WAM!
4th	(Alberta) Calgary RATH
5th	(Quebec) Montreal Mission
6th	(Ontario) Ottawa Ice
7th	(Ontario) Waterloo Wildfire
8th	(Ontario) Gloucester Devils

2015–16

The 2015–16 NRL Championship finals were played at the 2016 Canadian Ringette Championships in London, Ontario. The 2015–16 season's winners were the Cambridge Turbos, runners-up were the Gloucester Devils, and the Ottawa Ice finished in third.

2015–16 National Ringette League season
Number of teams	Season champions
15	Cambridge Turbos
Place	Team
1st place, gold medalist(s)	(Ontario) Cambridge Turbos
2nd place, silver medalist(s)	(Ontario) Gloucester Devils
3rd place, bronze medalist(s)	(Ontario) Ottawa Ice
4th	(Alberta) Edmonton WAM!
5th	(Quebec) Montreal Mission
6th	(Alberta) Calgary RATH
7th	(New Brunswick) Atlantic Attack
8th	(Alberta) Edmonton Black Gold Rush

2016–17

The 2016–17 NRL Championship finals were played at the 2017 Canadian Ringette Championships in Leduc, Alberta.

2016–17 National Ringette League season
Number of teams	Season champions
16	Cambridge Turbos
Place	Team
1st place, gold medalist(s)	(Ontario) Cambridge Turbos
2nd place, silver medalist(s)	(New Brunswick) Atlantic Attack
3rd place, bronze medalist(s)	(Ontario) Waterloo Wildfire
4th	(Ontario) Richmond Hill Lightning
5th	(Alberta) Edmonton WAM!
6th	(Alberta) Calgary RATH
7th	(Ontario) Ottawa Ice
8th	(Alberta) Edmonton Black Gold Rush

2017–18

The 2017–18 NRL season began on September 30, 2017, and ended on April 14, 2018. The 2018 Canadian Ringette Championships took place in Winnipeg, Manitoba, from April 9 to 14, 2018.

2017–18 National Ringette League season
Number of teams	Season champions
15	Atlantic Attack
Place	Team
1st place, gold medalist(s)	(New Brunswick) Atlantic Attack
2nd place, silver medalist(s)	(Alberta) Edmonton WAM!
3rd place, bronze medalist(s)	(Ontario) Cambridge Turbos
4th	(Alberta) Calgary RATH
5th	(Ontario) Richmond Hill Lightning
6th	(Quebec) Montreal Mission
7th	(Quebec) Gatineau Fusion
8th	Manitoba Intact

2018–19

The 2018–19 season's winners were the Calgary RATH, runners-up were the Atlantic Attack, and the Cambridge Turbos finished in third.

2018–19 National Ringette League season
Number of teams	Season champions
	Calgary RATH
Place	Team
1st place, gold medalist(s)	(Alberta) Calgary RATH
2nd place, silver medalist(s)	(New Brunswick) Atlantic Attack
3rd place, bronze medalist(s)	(Ontario) Cambridge Turbos
4th	(Ontario) Waterloo Wildfire
5th	(Alberta) Edmonton WAM!
6th	(Quebec) Montreal Mission
7th	Manitoba Intact
8th	(Ontario) Ottawa Ice

2019–21

The 2019–20 and 2020–21 National Ringette League seasons were cancelled due to the COVID-19 pandemic.

2021–22

The 2021–22 season saw the league begin playing in a hub-format due to the COVID-19 pandemic. While the league previously played 15 teams, it was reduced to 12 for the season. 5 teams had withdrawn, including: BC Thunder, Bourassa Royal, Richmond Hill Lightning, Lac-Saint-Louis Adrenaline, and the Ottawa Ice. However, two new teams joined: the Nepean Ravens and the Saskatchewan Heat. The Manitoba Intact were renamed the Manitoba Herd.

The season's winners were the Calgary RATH, runners-up were the Edmonton WAM!, and the Cambridge Turbos finished in third.

2021–22 National Ringette League season
Number of teams	Season champions
12	Calgary RATH
Place	Team
1st place, gold medalist(s)	(Alberta) Calgary RATH
2nd place, silver medalist(s)	(Alberta) Edmonton WAM!
3rd place, bronze medalist(s)	(Ontario) Cambridge Turbos
4th	(New Brunswick) Atlantic Attack
5th	(Quebec) Rive Sud Révolution
6th	Manitoba Herd
7th	(Ontario) Waterloo Wildfire
8th	(Quebec) Gatineau Fusion
9th	(Quebec) Montreal Mission
10th	(Alberta) Edmonton Black Gold Rush
11th	(Ontario) Nepean Ravens
12th	Saskatchewan Heat

2022–23

The 2023 Canadian Ringette Championships were hosted in Regina, Saskatchewan from April 9–15, 2023.

2022–23 National Ringette League season
Number of teams	Season champions
13	Edmonton WAM!
Place	Team
1st place, gold medalist(s)	(Alberta) Edmonton WAM!
2nd place, silver medalist(s)	(Quebec) Montreal Mission
3rd place, bronze medalist(s)	(Alberta) Calgary RATH
4th	(Ontario) Waterloo Wildfire

2023–24

The 2024 Canadian Ringette Championships were hosted in Dieppe, New Brunswick from April 7–13, 2024.

2023–24 National Ringette League season
Number of teams	Season champions
13	Edmonton WAM!
Place	Team
1st place, gold medalist(s)	(Alberta) Edmonton WAM!
2nd place, silver medalist(s)	(Alberta) Calgary RATH
3rd place, bronze medalist(s)	(Ontario) Waterloo Wildfire
4th	(Quebec) Montreal Mission

2024–25

== Broadcasting ==
The National Ringette League championship final has usually been broadcast on Rogers TV.

== Team history ==
Over thirty teams have competed in the NRL during different periods of the league's existence. The first NRL season began in November 2004 with 17 teams. During the second NRL season in 2005–06, two new teams joined the league bringing the league total to nineteen. The teams were then divided into four conferences. However, during the off season, three teams folded, citing low attendance revenue.

Two teams in the province of Manitoba folded prior to 2016, the Manitoba Jets and the Winnipeg Prairie Fire. A new Manitoba team was created in 2016, the Manitoba Intact. The Manitoba Intact competed in the NRL Western Conference. For the 2021–22 season, the Intact were renamed the Manitoba Herd.

For the 2021–22 season, the National Ringette League had a number of teams withdraw from the league for various reasons, primarily due to COVID-19. For the prior 2020–21 season, the NRL had fifteen teams competing, with the BC Thunder failing to put forward a team and withdrawing. In 2021–2022 a new team was formed in Ontario, the Nepean Ravens, and the NRL returned to Saskatchewan with a new team, the Saskatchewan Heat. For the 2022–23 season, the BC Thunder rejoined the league. On January 13, 2025, the League announced that the Rocky Mountain Rage would begin play in the 2025–26 season. The Nepean Ravens changed their name to the Eastern Ontario Capitals for the 2025-26 season.

(* = returned to league)

NRL team history as of 2022–23 season
National Ringette League teams
TOTAL
Total current (14)	Total defunct or inactive (22)
British Columbia
Current (1)	Defunct/Inactive (4)
* (British Columbia) BC Thunder (returned to league after 2021–22 withdrawal)	(British Columbia) Lower Mainland Thunder (aka LMRL Thunder)
	(British Columbia) BC Reign
	(British Columbia) Fraser Valley Avalanche⁣
	* (British Columbia) BC Thunder withdrew for the 2021–22 season (announced October 2021)
Alberta
Current (3)	Defunct/Inactive (1)
(Alberta) Edmonton WAM!	(Alberta) Edmonton Edge
(Alberta) Calgary RATH	
(Alberta) Edmonton Black Gold Rush	
(Alberta) Rocky Mountain Rage
Saskatchewan
Current (1)	Defunct/Inactive (1)
Saskatchewan Heat	(Saskatchewan) Saskatoon Wild⁣
Manitoba
Current (1)	Defunct/Inactive (7)
Manitoba Herd	(Manitoba) APFG Sixers (Assiniboine Park/Fort Garry)
	(Manitoba) Eastman Flames
	BoniVital Angels (BVRA) (St. Boniface and St. Vital areas (District 5) of Winnipeg, Manitoba)
	Manitoba Moose
	Manitoba Prairie Fire
	(Manitoba) Winnipeg Prairie Fire
	Manitoba Jets
	Manitoba Intact
Ontario
Current (3)	Defunct/Inactive (4)
Eastern Ontario Capitals	(Ontario) Gloucester Devils(withdrew in 2017)⁣
(Ontario) Waterloo Wildfire	(Ontario) Whitby Wild
(Ontario) Cambridge Turbos	(Ontario) Richmond Hill Lightning
	(Ontario) Ottawa Ice
Quebec
Current (3)	Defunct/Inactive (4)
(Quebec) Gatineau Fusion	(Quebec) Bourassa Royal
(Quebec) Montreal Mission	(Quebec) Lac-Saint-Louis Adrenaline (LSL)
(Quebec) Rive-Sud Révolution	Quebec City Cyclones
	(Quebec) BLL Nordiques (Bourassa-Laval-Lanaudière)
Atlantic Provinces
Current (1)	Defunct/Inactive (0)
(New Brunswick) Atlantic Attack	Atlantic Sixers

== Regular season team records ==
Initial record was from 2007–08 season. Stats updated as of end of 2017–18 season. Teams in italics no longer compete in the National Ringette League as of the 2021–22 season.

2017–18 season
Team	Season	GP	W	L	SOL	GDNP	Pt
Atlantic Attack	7	186	95	82	9	0	199
Rive-Sud Révolution	11	309	109	188	12	1	230
Montreal Mission	11	308	244	53	11	2	499
Edmonton Black Gold Rush	3	74	19	47	8	0	46
Calgary RATH	10	250	161	67	22	0	340
Edmonton WAM!	10	250	151	85	14	0	316
Cambridge Turbos	11	309	261	31	17	1	539
Gatineau Fusion	10	279	72	193	14	0	158
Waterloo Wildfire	11	309	134	158	17	1	285
BC Reign	1	18	0	18	0	2	0
Gloucester Devils	10	288	150	117	21	0	321
Manitoba Jets	4	103	40	55	8	1	88
Prairie Fire	5	127	91	31	5	1	187
Quebec City Cyclones	6	182	87	80	15	0	189
Saskatoon Wild	4	104	24	76	4	0	52
Whitby Wild	4	123	23	89	11	0	57
Bourassa Royal	11	310	86	207	17	0	189
Lac St.Louis Adrenaline	11	308	89	204	15	2	193
BC Thunder	6	151	67	76	8	0	142
Manitoba Intact	2	48	26	18	4	0	56
Ottawa Ice	11	307	208	82	17	3	433
Richmond Hill Lighting	11	308	178	113	17	2	373

== Notable people ==
=== Keely Brown ===
Keely Brown, a former Team Canada ringette goaltender and coach, played for the Edmonton WAM! for 10 years as its goaltender and helped form the National Ringette League in 2002 and 2003. She has been inducted into the Ringette Canada Hall of Fame.

=== Terry McAdam ===
Terry McAdam from Saskatchewan was inducted into the Ringette Canada Hall of Fame in 2021. McAdam was instrumental in helping begin the development of the National Ringette League as well as one of its first teams, the Saskatoon Wild. During its time in the NRL, the Wild had also acquired Erin Cumpstone.

=== Erin Cumpston ===
Erin Cumpstone was a player for the NRL's Saskatoon Wild and was also a member of Canada's 2010 National Ringette Team during the 2010 World Ringette Championships. Cumpstone also played ringette at the 1999 Canada Winter Games. She was also a highly accomplished softball player and played for Canada's women's national softball team which finished in 5th place at the 2004 Summer Olympics. Cumpston later became a coach for the National Ringette League's, Saskatchewan Heat.

=== Salla Kyhälä ===
Salla Kyhälä is one of a number of ringette players from Finland who competed in the NRL. Kyhälä played for the now defunct NRL team, the Saskatoon Wild, and also played for the Finland national ringette team and SM Ringette

=== Anna Vanhatalo ===
Anna Vanhatalo was a goaltender for the Montreal Mission. Originally from Finland, Vanhatalo also played for Finland's national ringette team in 2004 and 2007.

== Gallery ==
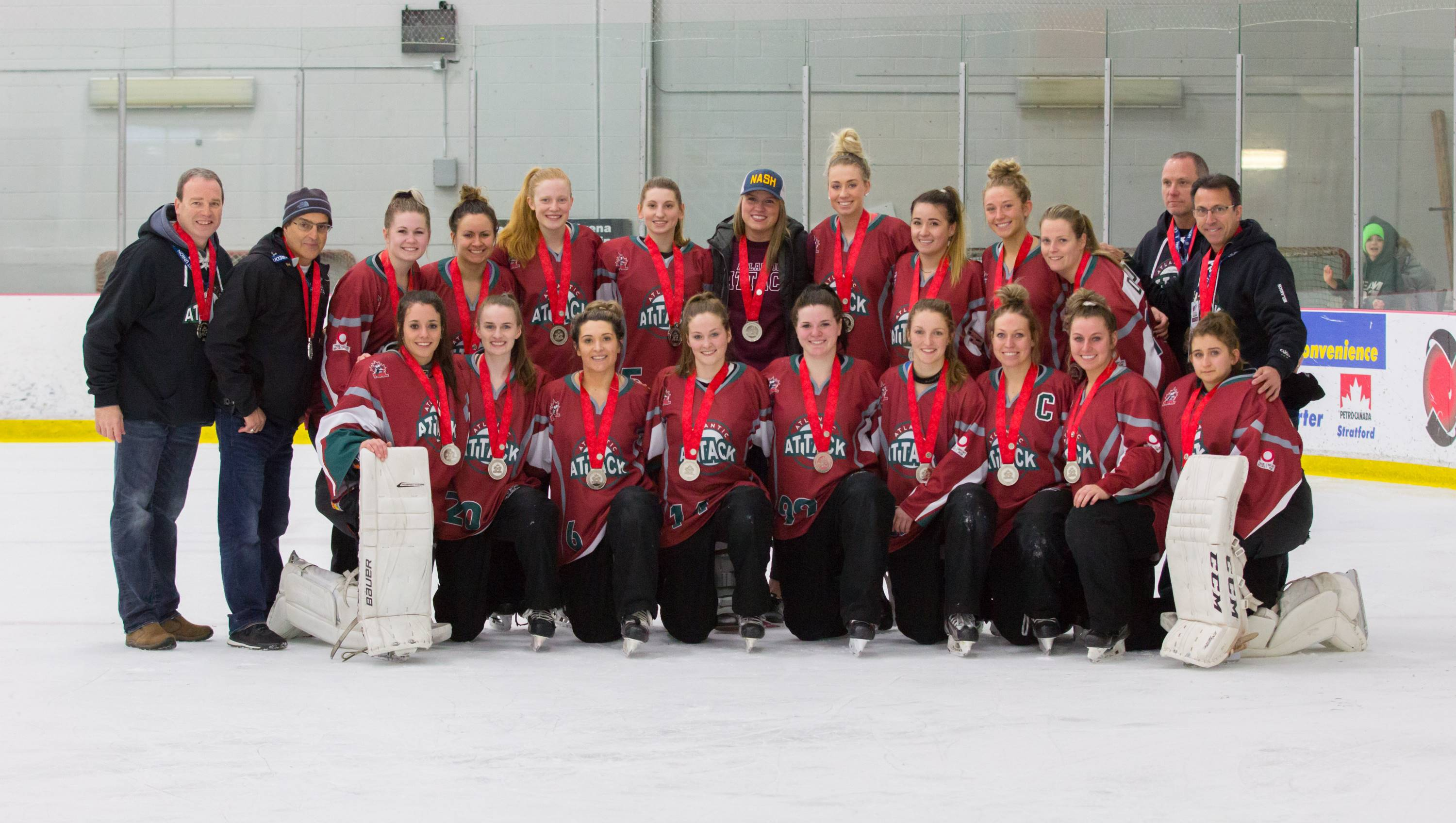
2019 NRL Silver: Atlantic Attack

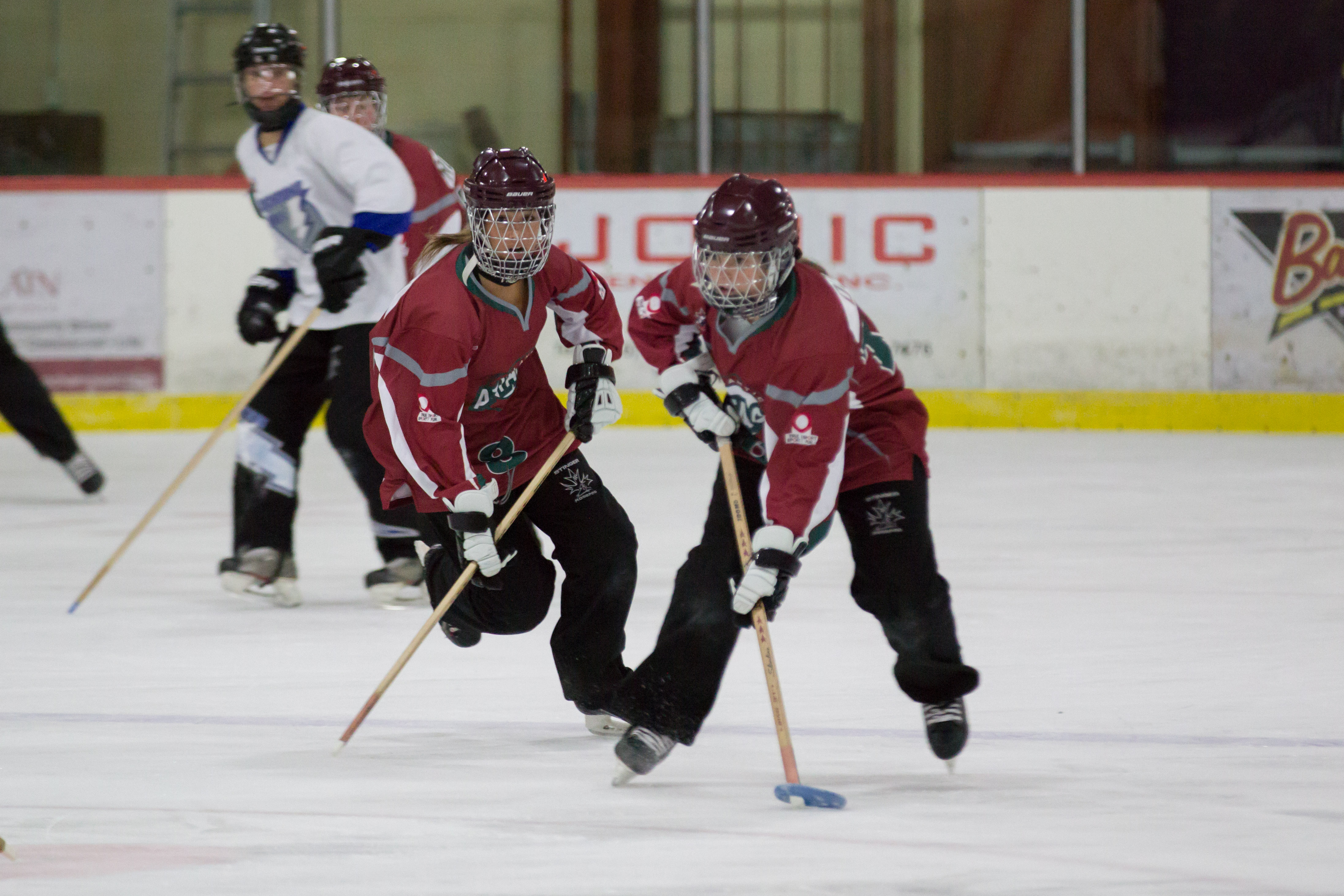
Atlantic Attack players: 2018

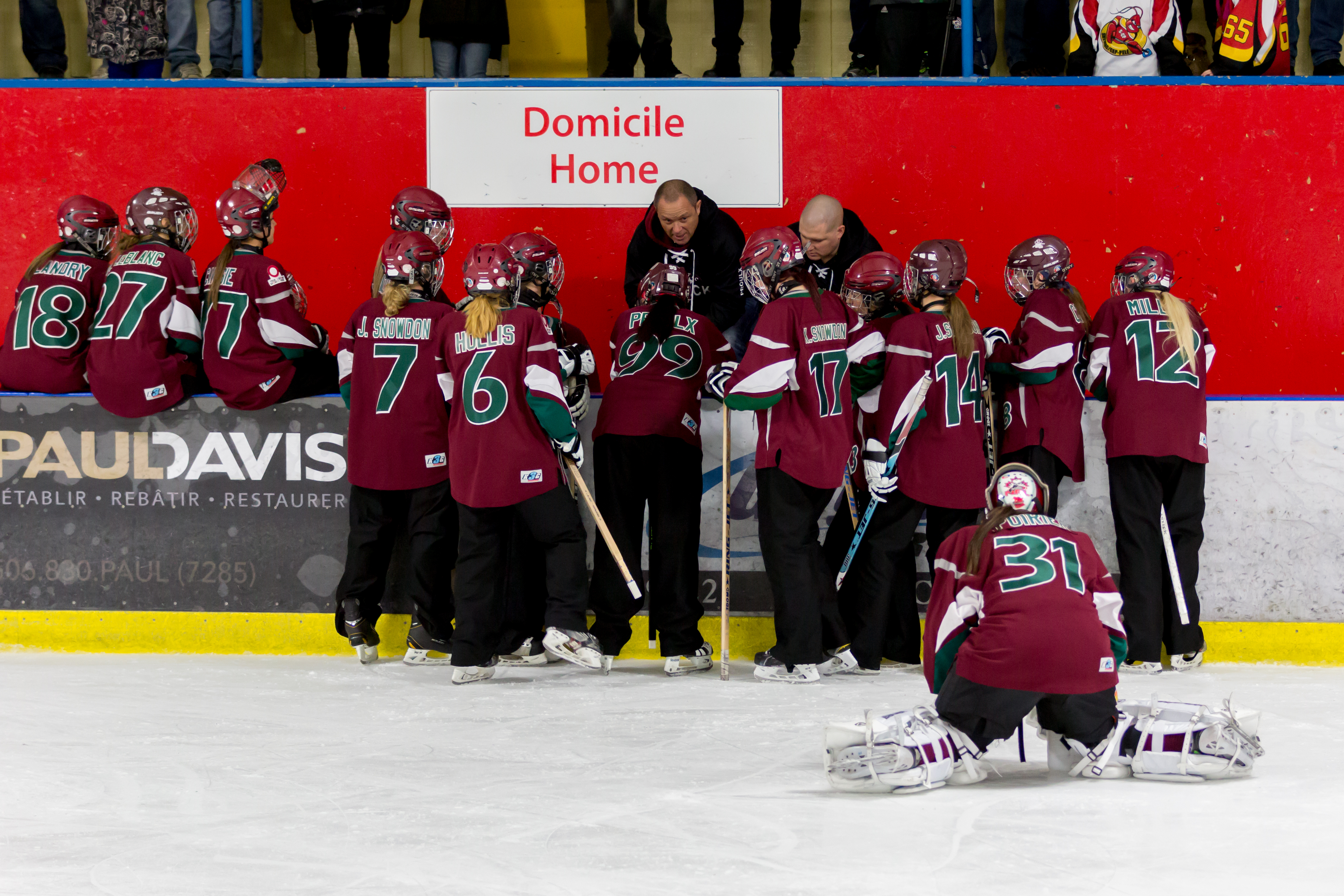
Atlantic Attack: 2016 NRL Playoffs

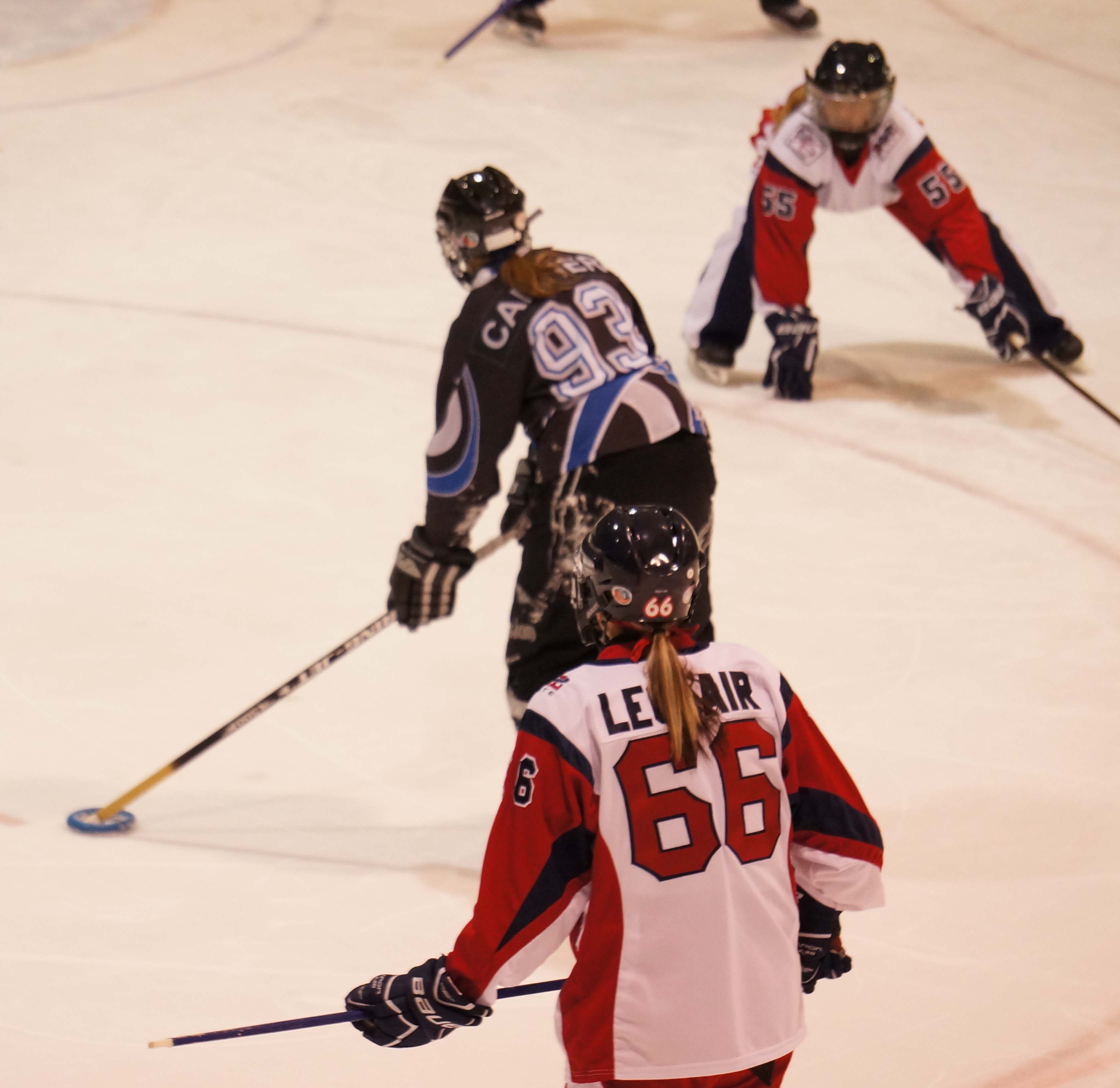
Montreal Mission player: 2012

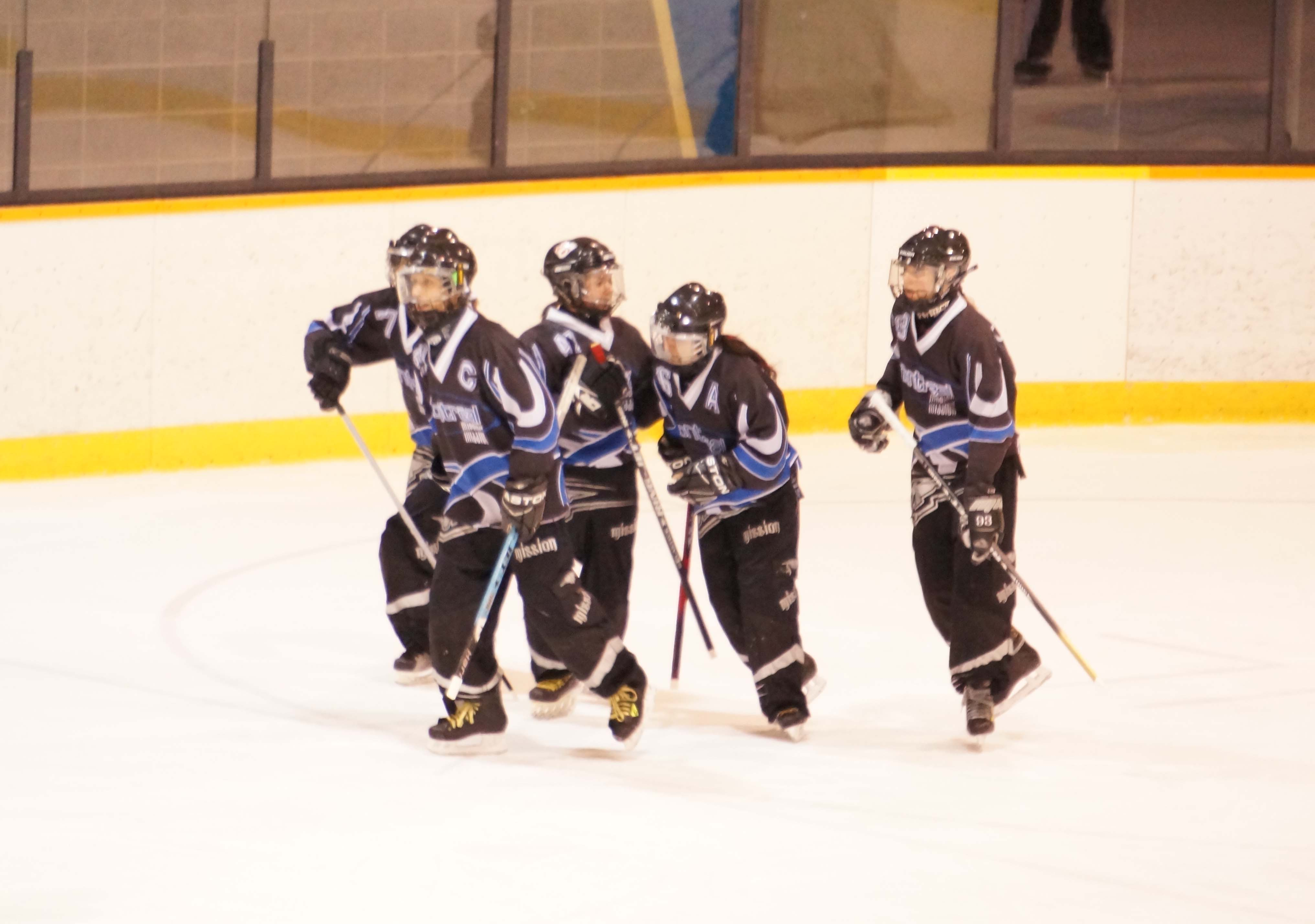
Montreal Mission: 2012

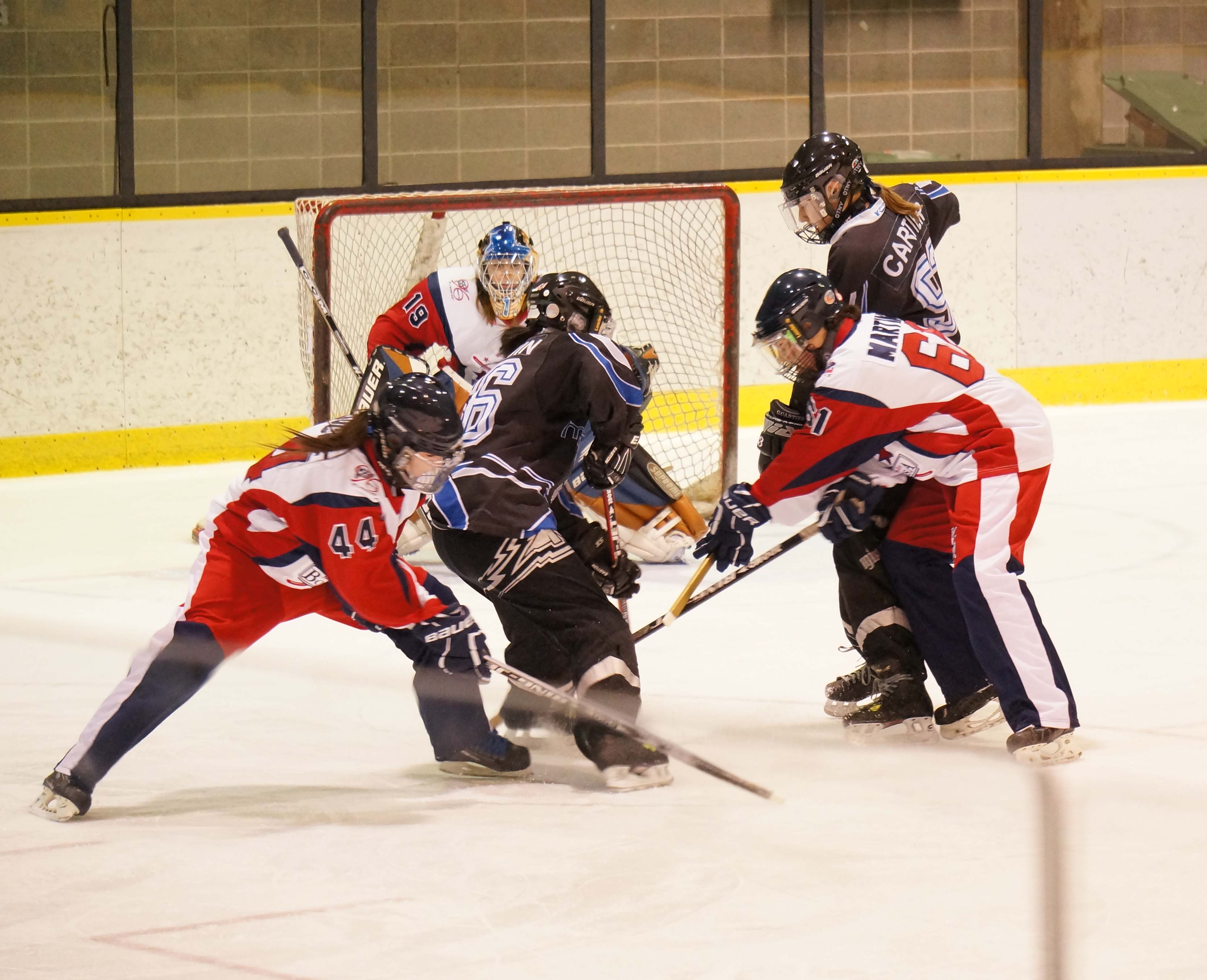
Bourassa Royal vs Montreal Mission: 2012

== See also ==
- SM-Ringette – semipro ringette league in Finland, formerly known as Ringeten SM-sarja
- Ringette Dam-SM – semipro ringette league in Sweden
- International Competitions
