= Saskatchewan Heat =

National Ringette League team in Saskatoon, Saskatchewan

- City: Saskatoon, Saskatchewan
- League: National Ringette League
- Conference: Western
- Founded: 2021
- Colours
- Head coach: Colleen Butz-Purdue
- Website: www.saskheatnrl.com

Previous franchise history
- Saskatoon Wild

Championships
- NRL Titles: 0

The Saskatchewan Heat is a ringette team in the National Ringette League's (NRL) Western Conference. The team is based in Saskatoon, Saskatchewan, and is organized by Ringette Saskatchewan. The team was previously called the Saskatoon Wild.

== Team history ==
The Heat were founded in 2021, marking Saskatoon's first entry in the NRL in a decade after the disbandment of its previous team, the Saskatoon Wild. Mel Brockman, a former Wild player and member of Team Canada, was a part of the establishment of the Heat in September 2021. Colleen Butz-Purdue was named the team's head coach.

Although the team lists Saskatoon as its home, it actively draws players from both the Saskatoon and Regina areas and holds tryouts and training in both cities. Saskatoon hosts the team's home games.

In their inaugural season, the Heat finished in last place at the 2022 NRL Canadian Ringette Championships. The Heat's Holly Kozan was named to the Canadian national junior roster for the 2022 World Ringette Championships in Finland. The 2023 Canadian Ringette Championships were hosted in Regina.

== Season-by-season ==
Season	League	Conference	GP	W	L	OTW	OTL	Pts	GF	GA
2021–22	NRL	Western	18	1	16	0	1	2	63	169
2022–23	NRL	Western	25	5	18	0	2	10	109	184

== Rosters ==
=== Current roster ===
#	Name	Position
	Chandria Yang	(AP/GUEST)
	Jade Weimer	(AP/GUEST)
	Dierdra Wiens	(AP/GUEST)
	Bailey Stangel	(AP/GUEST)
	Alyssa Hinz	(AP/GUEST)
	Hannah Corney	(AP/GUEST)
	Dayle Phaneuf	(AP/GUEST)
	Ally Lenz	(AP/GUEST)
1	Holly Kozan	G
3	Madeline Stang	F
4	Jaycee Cale	D
5	Maya Fleury	C
8	Kennedy Gray	D
9	Jordy Voykin	D
10	Keala Fleury	F
11	Sam Skaar	D
15	Bryn Jones	F
16	Mel Brockman	C/D
18	Kaitlynn McCaw	D
21	Lexi Kruger	F
27	Kelly Davison	F
31	Caitlyn Robertson	G
93	Madison Ryan	C
97	Karly Butz	D
98	Taylor Lorenz	F

== Team Canada players ==
Saskatchewan Heat players have competed for the Canada national ringette team at the World Ringette Championships (WRC) and are listed in the table below.

Year	Team	Player
2007	2007 Team Canada	Mel Brockman (Saskatoon Wild)
2022	2022 Team Canada Junior (U21)	Holland Kozan, goalie
