= Atlantic Attack =

National Ringette League team in Dieppe, New Brunswick

- City: Dieppe, New Brunswick
- League: National Ringette League
- Conference: Eastern
- Founded: 2011
- Home arena: UNIplex, Dieppe
- Colours
- General manager: (Canada) André Dupuis
- Head coach: (Canada) Gilles Proulx
- Website: NRL.ca
Home colours	Away colours

Championships
- NRL Titles: 1 (2018)

The Atlantic Attack is a ringette team in the Canadian National Ringette League (NRL) that mostly consists of players from Atlantic Canada and is based in Dieppe, New Brunswick. The team competes in the Eastern Conference in the White division and was founded in 2011. Its home arena is in Cocagne, New Brunswick. In their 7th season, the Atlantic Attack won their first National Ringette League Playoff title. In the past the Attack also competed against Bourassa Royal before that NRL team was discontinued.

== Team history ==
The Attack's inaugural season was in 2011–12. The first team roster was announced on September 21, 2011 and their first game in the league was played on October 15, 2011 against Gatineau Fusion. The first game in their home arena in Cocagne was played on February 5, 2012, against Le Royal de Bourassa. In their first season they made the Eastern Playoffs, but with two losses in two games did not continue to the 2011-12 NRL Championship, which is played by the eight best teams in the league.

For the 2012–13 season, the Attack had 16 returning players and additionally the newcomers Nicole Richard (defense) and Marissa Babin (goaltender). This season also saw the first appearance of Jenny Snowdon, younger sister of defense player Jessica Snowdon. On her National Ringette League debut weekend with Attack on December 15 and 16 against Rive Sud Revolution and Winnipeg Prairie Fire, at age 15, she managed to score three hat tricks in her first three games, which was a phenomenal start to a successful career with the Attack. Jenny Snowdon ended up playing five game in that season and finished with eleven goals and three assists. Despite a solid performance in their second season the 2013 NRL championship on home ice in Fredericton, New Brunswick, proved a difficult test for the Atlantic Attack. The team ended up with seven losses in seven games and therefore ended on the last place. Nevertheless, forward Martine Caissie managed to propel herself into the NRL top 20 scorer list with 41 goals and 25 assists.

The Atlantic Attack logo used from 2011 until the 2021-22 season

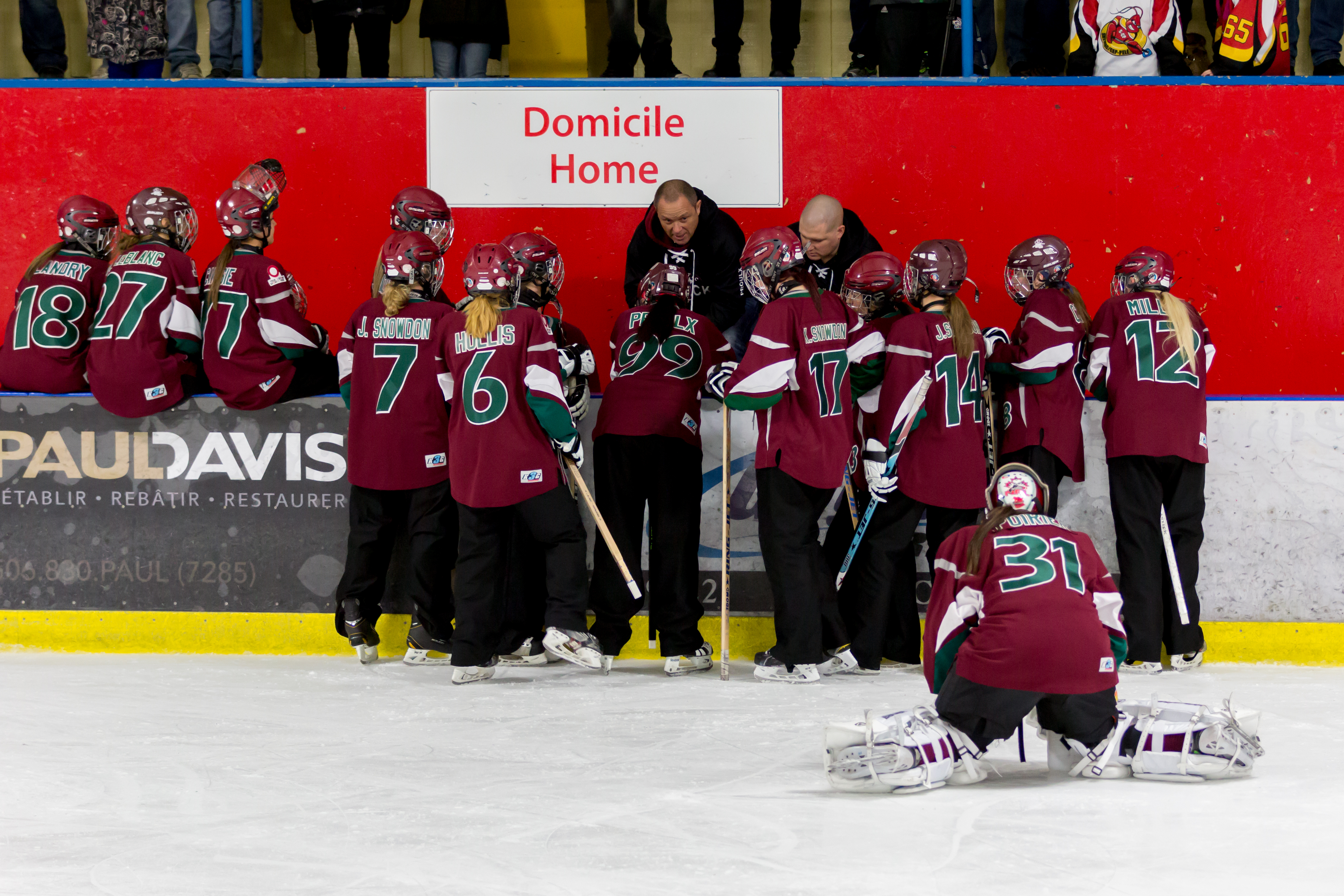
Atlantic Attack during a playoff game on March 12th, 2016

In the 2013–14 season, the team saw a huge change in the roster with eleven rookies also being the youngest team in the league with seven players under the age of 18. With completely changed defensive and offensive lines the Attack had their worst season start with nine losses. The first win of the season could be achieved on November 23 against Le Royal de Bourassa. This season saw the first time three of the four Snowdon sibling in the NRL (Jessica, Kelly and Jenny Snowdon). Miguelle Proulx ended in her first season as scoring leader for the team with 42 goals and 10 assists. The troubling season ended with 6 points and the last place in the NRL regular season and therefore no spot in the Eastern Conference playoffs.

The 2014–15 season saw most of the players from the previous year and the experienced players Martine Caissie, Joelle Proulx and Jocelyne Landry returning after a one-year hiatus. The team's season started early in Ottawa on September 27 and 28 against Ottawa Ice. 2014 ended for the team claiming the 7th place out of eleven teams in the Eastern Conference and their first ever win against Montreal Mission in their 4th season. The rest of the season saw them drop to the 9th place in the Eastern conference and a three-game elimination series against Gloucester Devils for a spot in the 2015 NRL Championship in Wood Buffalo, Alberta. The Attack lost two games against Gloucester Devils and therefore did not qualify for the 2015 NRL Championship. Nevertheless, the team had a very successful season after a disappointing 2013–14 season with Jenny Snowdon finishing in the top 20 league scoring with 38 goals and 33 assists.

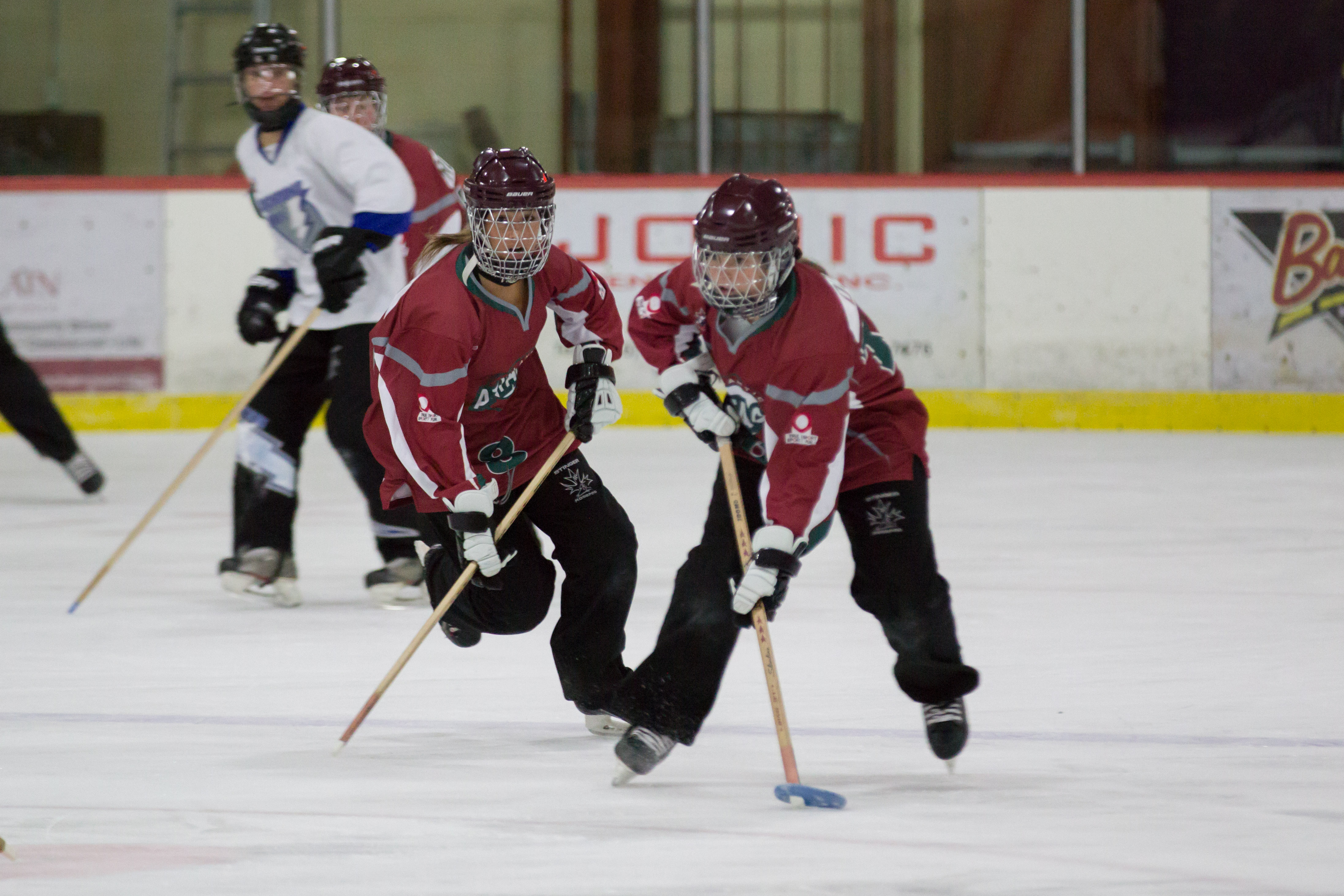
Jocelyne Landry and Josee Doiron charging down the ice in a game against Richmond Hill Lightning on October 28th 2018

On October 3, 2015, the Attack opened the 2015–16 season with three wins against Rive Sud Revolution in Fredericton. The team had their best season start in team history with 15 victories and only three losses by mid December, claiming the first place in the Eastern conference and Martine Caissie leading the NRL scoring board with 42 goals and 18 assists. Finishing their best season so far with a 4th overall and 3rd place in the Eastern Conference regular season, the team brings the Eastern Conference Playoffs to Atlantic Canada for the first time. With two wins against Le Royal de Bourassa the Attack secure a spot in the NRL championship 2016 in London, Ontario. The team ended the championship with the 7th place.

Season six sees almost the same roster as the previous season. After their best season behind them, expectations were high for the 2016–17 season. With a third-place finish in the Eastern Conference the Attack were directly qualified for the NRL championship in Leduc, Alberta. After losing the opening game, the team won the six following games, securing the first place in the round-robin, earning the direct bye to the finals against six time NRL champion Cambridge Turbos, who were also crowned NRL champion the previous three seasons. With a 6–5 defeat the Attack won the silver medal and their first podium finish since the joined the National Ringette League in 2011. Goalie Karine Doiron and forward Martine Caissie were named first-team all-stars.

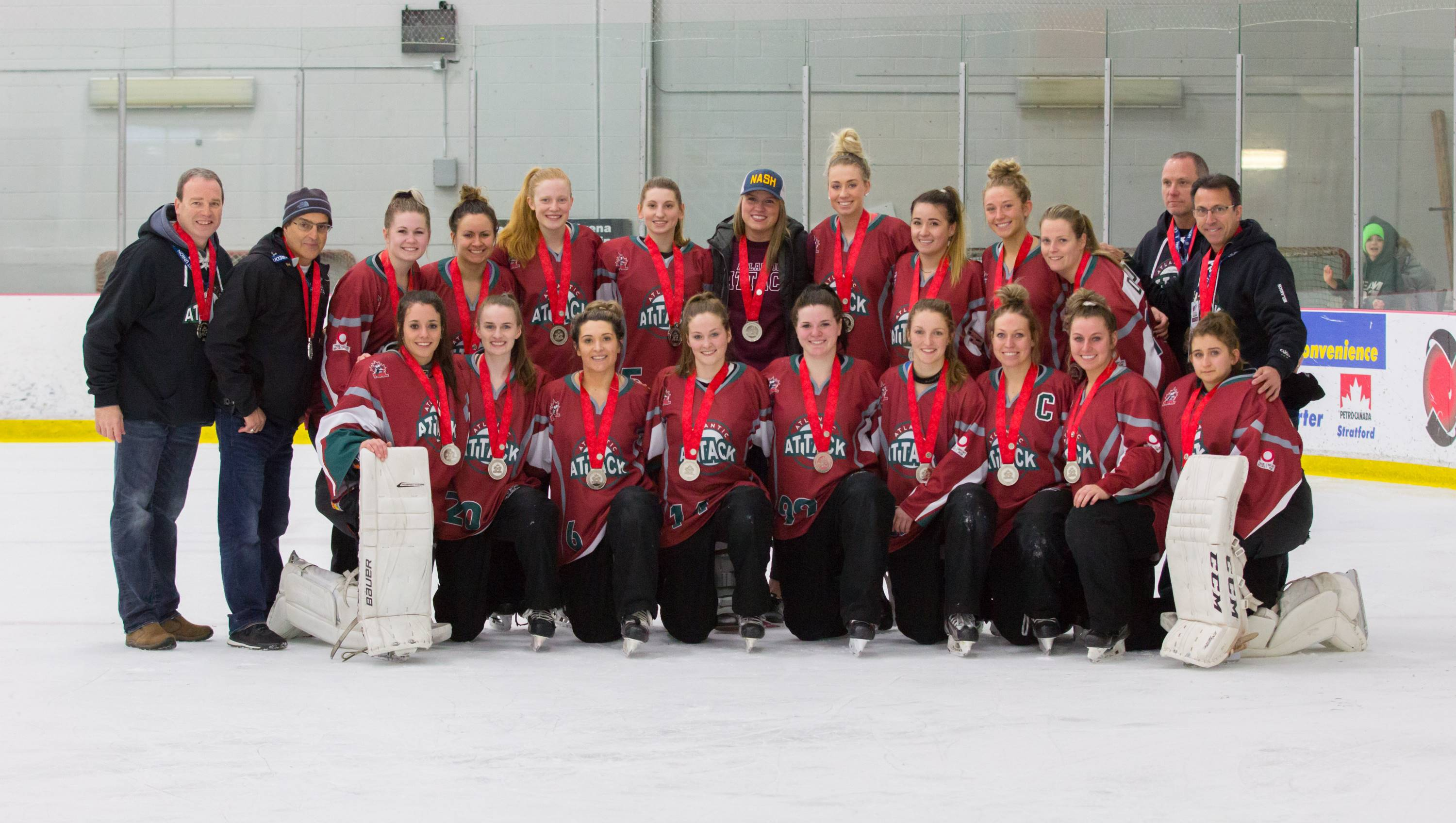
On April 13 the Atlantic Attack win the silver medal at the 2019 Canadian Ringette Championship in Charlottetown, P.E.I.

The 2017–18 season again saw most of the players returning from the very successful previous season and for the first time all four Snowdon sisters playing for Attack (Jessica, Kelly, Jenny and Britney Snowdon). The regular season saw them in 3rd place in the Eastern Conference and 4th place overall. The team claimed the 3rd place in the Eastern Conference Playoffs and claimed a spot for the NRL championship in Winnipeg, Manitoba. With six wins and one loss, claiming the 1st place in the round robin, the Attack received a direct bye to the gold medal game. In a 5–3 win against three time NRL champion Edmonton WAM! the attack win their first NRL championship in their 7th season.

With 17 returning players for the 2018–19, season the team could secure the 4th place in the regular season. After eliminating Richmond Hill Lightning in the Eastern Conference playoffs, the Attack got the opportunity to defend their title from the previous season. The 2019 Canadian Ringette Championships took place in Summerside and Charlottetown, Prince Edward Island. The Attack was defeated 3–5 by Calgary RATH in the final.

The 2019–20 season saw several key players leaving the team. Karine Doiron (No. 30) and Martine Caissie (No. 77) joined Gatineau Fusion, while Josee Doiron (No. 16), Joelle Proulx (No. 22), Ashley Hollis (No. 6) and Jessica Snowdon (No. 7) retired. General manager Hélène L. Beaulieu also stepped down. After a challenging season putting the Attack on the 9th overall place in the regular season, the NRL Championship was cancelled due to the start of the COVID-19 pandemic.

Due to the COVID-19 pandemic, the 2020-21 NRL season was cancelled.

== League competition 2022–23 season ==
In 2022–23, the NRL entered its 18th season with thirteen teams competing:

Western Conference

- BC Thunder
- Edmonton Black Gold Rush
- Edmonton WAM!
- Calgary RATH
- Saskatchewan Heat
- Manitoba Herd

Eastern Conference Red

- Nepean Ravens
- Waterloo Wildfire
- Gatineau Fusion
- Cambridge Turbos

Eastern Conference White

- Montreal Mission
- Rive-Sud Révolution
- Atlantic Attack

== Year by year ==
Year by year listing of all season played by Atlantic Attack

GP = Games played, W = Wins, L = Losses, OTL = Overtime losses, SOL = Shootout losses, Pts = Points, Pct = Percentage, GF = Goals for, GA = Goals against

NRL season	Division	# Teams	Regular season										Canadian Ringette Championship (CRC)		
NRL season	Division	# Teams	Finish	GP	W	L	OTL	SOL	Pts	Pct	GF	GA	Conference Playoff	First Round (best of 8)	Finals
2011-12	White	19	8th	30	14	12	0	4	32	0.533	142	151	5th	-	-
2012-13	White	16	10th	28	12	16	0	0	24	0.429	171	206	Qualified as host team	8th	-
2013-14	White	13	13th	26	3	23	0	0	6	0.115	118	227	Did not qualify	-	-
2014-15	White	14	11th	28	11	16	0	1	23	0.411	187	212	7th	-	-
2015-16	White	15	4th	28	20	7	0	1	41	0.732	201	164	2nd	7th	-
2016-17	White	16	3rd	24	18	4	0	2	38	0.792	184	135	Qualified as 2nd in Eastern Conference	2nd	Silver medal
2017-18	White	15	4th	22	17	4	0	1	35	0.795	174	121	3rd	1st	Gold medal
2018-19	White	14	3rd	28	20	8	0	0	40	0.714	222	155	1st	1st	Silver medal
2019-20 ^{†}	White	13	9th	23	9	12	0	0	20	0.435	142	165	n/a	n/a	n/a
2020-21 ^{‡}	White	-	-	-	-	-	-	-	-	-	-	-	-	-	-
2021-22	White	12	2nd	12	11	1	0	0	31	0.917	95	61	n/a	2nd (Pool B)	Semi Finals (4th)
2022-23	White	13	1st	18	17	1	0	0	50	0.944	122	84	n/a	3rd (Pool B)	Quarter Finals

^{†} Due to the COVID-19 pandemic, the NRL championship was cancelled.

^{‡} Due to the COVID-19 pandemic, the complete 2020-21 NRL season was cancelled.

== Roster 2018–19 season ==
Roster 2018-19 Season
Forwards
#	Name	Affiliated	Pos	Shoots		Height	Birthdate	Status	Home town	Prov
3	Monica Collette	*	F	R		5'7	'00	AP	Dieppe	(New Brunswick)
5	Madisson Gaudet		F	L		5'4	'00	None	Grand Barachois	(New Brunswick)
8	Taylor Gray	*	F	L		5'9	'99	None	Hammonds Plain	(Nova Scotia)
16	Josee Doiron		F	L		5'6	'86	None	Cap-Pelé	(New Brunswick)
17	Jenny Snowdon		F	R		5'4	'97	None	Moncton	(New Brunswick)
18	Jocelyne Landry		F	R		5'5	'87	None	Memramcook	(New Brunswick)
20	Meredith Tulloch	*	F	L		5'6	'99	None	Bedford	(Nova Scotia)
22	Joelle Proulx		F	R		5'9	'91	None	Dieppe	(New Brunswick)
24	Cloe Leblanc	*	F	R		5'4	'02	RAP	Memramcook	(New Brunswick)
25	Bianca Roche	*	F	R		5'6	'00	AP	Souris	(Prince Edward Island)
27	Dominik LeBlanc		F	L		5'7	'96	None	Dieppe	(New Brunswick)
28	Mariah Crowley	*	F	L		5'4	'01	AP	Charlottetown	(Prince Edward Island)
71	Britney Snowdon		F	R		5'5	'00	None	Moncton	(New Brunswick)
77	Martine Caissie		F	L		5'3	'93	None	Bouctouche	(New Brunswick)
99	Miguelle Proulx		F	L		5'7	'96	None	Dieppe	(New Brunswick)
Defence
#	Name		Pos	Shoots		Height	Birthdate	Status	Home town	Prov
2	Renee Richard		D	L		5'3	'96	None	Grande-Digue	(New Brunswick)
4	Gabrielle Dagenais	*	D	R		5'7	'00	None	Timmins	(Ontario)
6	Ashley Hollis		D	R		5'5	'96	None	Stratford	(Prince Edward Island)
7	Jessica Snowdon		D	R		5'4	'92	None	Moncton	(New Brunswick)
10	Kim Melanson		D	L		5'5	'96	None	Shediac	(New Brunswick)
12	Natasha Mills		D	L		5'6	'96	None	Notre-Dame	(New Brunswick)
14	Isabelle Cormier		D	R		5'6	'96	None	Dieppe	(New Brunswick)
Goalies
#	Name		Pos	Shoots	Catches	Height	Birthdate	Status	Home town	Prov
29	Amelie Duguay		G	R	L	5'4	'01	None	Dieppe	(New Brunswick)
30	Karine Doiron		G	R	L	5'2	'94	None	Saint Anne de Kent	(New Brunswick)
31	Nathalie Poirier		G	R	L	5'6	'96	None	Dieppe	(New Brunswick)

== Roster 2019–20 season ==
Roster 2019-20 Season
Forwards
#	Name	Affiliated	Pos	Shoots		Height	Birthdate	Status	Home town	Prov
5	Madisson Gaudet		F	L		5'4	'00	None	Grand Barachois	(New Brunswick)
7	Jenny Snowdon		F	R		5'4	'97	None	Moncton	(New Brunswick)
16	Monica Collette	*	F	R		5'7	'00	None	Dieppe	(New Brunswick)
17	Courtney Carter		?	R			'03	AP		
18	Jocelyne Landry		F	R		5'5	'87	None	Memramcook	(New Brunswick)
20	Meredith Tulloch		F	L		5'6	'99	None	Bedford	(Nova Scotia)
22	Alexane Dupuis	*	F	R			'02	AP		
24	Cloe Leblanc		F	R		5'4	'02	None	Memramcook	(New Brunswick)
25	Bianca Roche		F	R		5'6	'00	AP	Souris	(Prince Edward Island)
27	Dominik LeBlanc		F	L		5'7	'96	None	Dieppe	(New Brunswick)
77	Britney Snowdon		F	R		5'5	'00	None	Moncton	(New Brunswick)
99	Miguelle Proulx		F	L		5'7	'96	None	Dieppe	(New Brunswick)
Defence
#	Name		Pos	Shoots		Height	Birthdate	Status	Home town	Prov
2	Renee Richard		D	L		5'3	'96	None	Grande-Digue	(New Brunswick)
4	Gabrielle Dagenais		D	R		5'7	'00	None	Timmins	(Ontario)
8	Meghan Williston		D	L		5'7	'00	None	Moncton	(New Brunswick)
10	Kim Melanson		D	L		5'5	'96	None	Shediac	(New Brunswick)
12	Natasha Mills		D	L		5'6	'96	None	Notre-Dame	(New Brunswick)
14	Isabelle Cormier		D	R		5'6	'96	None	Dieppe	(New Brunswick)
71	Arianne Hebert		D	R			'00	AP		
Goalies
#	Name		Pos	Shoots	Catches	Height	Birthdate	Status	Home town	Prov
29	Amelie Duguay		G	R	L	5'4	'01	None	Dieppe	(New Brunswick)
31	Nathalie Poirier		G	R	L	5'6	'96	None	Dieppe	(New Brunswick)

== Roster 2012–21 season ==
Due to the COVID-19 pandemic, the complete 2020-21 NRL season was cancelled.

== Roster 2021–22 season ==
Roster 2021-22 Season
Forwards
#	Name	Affiliated	Pos	Shoots		Height	Birthdate	Home town	Prov
2	Cloé LeBlanc		F	R		5'4	'02	Memramcook	(New Brunswick)
3	Alexane Dupuis		F	L		5'2	'02	Dieppe	(New Brunswick)
3	Sydney Dagenais	*	F	-		-	-	Timmins	(Ontario)
5	Madisson Gaudet		F	L		5'4	'00	Haute-Aboujagane	(New Brunswick)
6	Ireland Moro		F	R		5'3	'01	Calgary	(Alberta)
7	Jenny Snowdon		F	R		5'4	'97	Moncton	(New Brunswick)
10	Meredith Tulloch		F	L		5'6	'99	Bedford	(Nova Scotia)
17	Courtney Carter	*	F	R		5'9	'03	Moncton	(New Brunswick)
18	Jocelyne Landry		F	R		5'5	'87	Memramcook	(New Brunswick)
24	Manon Vautour	*	F	L		5'3	'03	Saint-Louis de Kent	(New Brunswick)
25	Bianca Roche	*	F	L		5'6	'00	Souris	(Prince Edward Island)
77	Britney Snowdon		F	R		5'5	'00	Moncton	(New Brunswick)
99	Miguelle Proulx		F	L		5'7	'96	Dieppe	(New Brunswick)
Defence
#	Name		Pos	Shoots		Height	Birthdate	Home town	Prov
4	Gabrielle Dagenais		D	R		5'7	'00	Timmins	(Ontario)
8	Meghan Williston		D	L		5'7	'00	Moncton	(New Brunswick)
12	Natasha Mills		D	L		5'6	'96	Saint-Antoine	(New Brunswick)
14	Mélissa Gould	*	D	R		5'5	'05	Memramcook	(New Brunswick)
16	Monica Collette		D	L		5'7	'00	Dieppe	(New Brunswick)
17	Kylee Mansfield		D	L		5'6	'01	Halifax	(Nova Scotia)
19	Belle Robichaud	*	D	L		5'4	'02	Halifax	(Nova Scotia)
22	Isabelle Cormier		D	R		5'7	'96	Dieppe	(New Brunswick)
27	Alexie Trudel	*	D	L		5'3	'00	Timmins	(Ontario)
Goalies
#	Name		Pos	Shoots	Catches	Height	Birthdate	Home town	Prov
29	Jasmine LeBlanc		G	R	L	5'4	'94	Dieppe	(New Brunswick)
31	Grace MacKenzie		G	R	L	5'3	'99	Stillwater Lake	(Nova Scotia)

== Roster 2022–23 season ==
Roster 2022-23 Season
Forwards
#	Name	Affiliated	Pos	Shoots		Height	Birthdate	Home town	Prov
2	Cloé LeBlanc		F	R		5'4	'02	Memramcook	(New Brunswick)
6	Ireland Moro		F	R		5'3	'01	Calgary	(Alberta)
7	Jenny Snowdon		F	R		5'4	'97	Moncton	(New Brunswick)
8	Jocelyne Landry	*	F	R		5'5	'87	Memramcook	(New Brunswick)
10	Meredith Tulloch		F	L		5'6	'99	Bedford	(Nova Scotia)
11	Grace MacMillan	*	F	-		5'4	'03	Moncton	(New Brunswick)
18	Madisson Gaudet		F	L		5'4	'00	Haute-Aboujagane	(New Brunswick)
19	Chloé Gaudet	*	F	-		5'7	'03	Rogersville	(New Brunswick)
21	Courtney Carter		F	-		5'9	'03	Moncton	(New Brunswick)
23	Manon Vautour		F	L		5'3	'03	Saint-Louis de Kent	(New Brunswick)
77	Britney Snowdon		F	R		5'5	'00	Moncton	(New Brunswick)
99	Miguelle Proulx		F	L		5'7	'96	Dieppe	(New Brunswick)
Defence
#	Name		Pos	Shoots		Height	Birthdate	Home town	Prov
3	Mélissa Gould	*	D	R		5'5	'05	Memramcook	(New Brunswick)
4	Jasmine Gallant	*	D	-		5'3	'04	Dieppe	(New Brunswick)
9	Geneviève Belliveau		D	-		5'6	'03	Dieppe	(New Brunswick)
12	Natasha Mills		D	L		5'6	'96	Saint-Antoine	(New Brunswick)
14	Nicole Richard		D	-		5'2	'89	Dieppe	(New Brunswick)
16	Monica Collette		D	L		5'7	'00	Dieppe	(New Brunswick)
20	Kylee Mansfield		D	L		5'6	'01	Halifax	(Nova Scotia)
22	Isabelle Cormier		D	R		5'7	'96	Dieppe	(New Brunswick)
Goalies
#	Name		Pos	Shoots	Catches	Height	Birthdate	Home town	Prov
31	Grace MacKenzie		G	R	L	5'3	'99	Stillwater Lake	(Nova Scotia)
41	Jasmine LeBlanc		G	R	L	5'4	'94	Dieppe	(New Brunswick)

== Roster 2023–24 season ==
Roster 2023-24 Season
Forwards
#	Name	Affiliated	Pos	Shoots		Height	Birthdate	Home town	Prov
2	Cloé LeBlanc		F	R		5'4	'02	Memramcook	(New Brunswick)
6	Ireland Moro	*	F	R		5'3	'01	Calgary	(Alberta)
7	Jenny Snowdon		F	R		5'4	'97	Moncton	(New Brunswick)
8	Taylor Beal	*	F	-		5'6	'06	Cap-Pelé	(New Brunswick)
10	Meredith Tulloch		F	L		5'6	'99	Bedford	(Nova Scotia)
18	Madisson Gaudet		F	L		5'4	'00	Haute-Aboujagane	(New Brunswick)
21	Courtney Carter		F	-		5'9	'03	Moncton	(New Brunswick)
23	Manon Vautour		F	L		5'3	'03	Saint-Louis de Kent	(New Brunswick)
27	Dominik LeBlanc		F	-		5'7	'96	Dieppe	(New Brunswick)
77	Britney Snowdon		F	R		5'5	'00	Moncton	(New Brunswick)
99	Miguelle Proulx		F	L		5'7	'96	Dieppe	(New Brunswick)
Defence
#	Name		Pos	Shoots		Height	Birthdate	Home town	Prov
4	Jasmine Gallant	*	D	-		5'3	'04	Dieppe	(New Brunswick)
9	Geneviève Belliveau		D	-		5'6	'03	Dieppe	(New Brunswick)
11	Julie Richard		D	-		5'7	'04	Moncton	(New Brunswick)
12	Natasha Mills	*	D	L		5'6	'96	Saint-Antoine	(New Brunswick)
14	Nicole Richard		D	-		5'2	'89	Dieppe	(New Brunswick)
15	Dayna Dingwell	*	D	-		5'6	'06	Souris	(Prince Edward Island)
16	Monica Collette		D	L		5'7	'00	Dieppe	(New Brunswick)
19	Chloé Gaudet		D	-		5'7	'03	Rogersville	(New Brunswick)
22	Isabelle Cormier		D	R		5'7	'96	Dieppe	(New Brunswick)
Goalies
#	Name		Pos	Shoots	Catches	Height	Birthdate	Home town	Prov
30	Sophie Daigle	*	G	-	-	5'4	'05	Dieppe	(New Brunswick)
31	Grace MacKenzie		G	R	L	5'3	'99	Stillwater Lake	(Nova Scotia)
41	Jasmine LeBlanc		G	R	L	5'4	'94	Dieppe	(New Brunswick)

== Other teams ==
The Atlantic Attack has competed against a number of other NRL teams including the Bourassa Royal, Montreal Mission, Calgary RATH, Rive-Sud Révolution, and the Cambridge Turbos.

== See also ==
- Ringette
- National Ringette League
- Cambridge Turbos
- Montreal Mission
- Bourassa Royal
- Calgary RATH
- Rive-Sud Révolution
