= Šajkaši =

- Tschaikisten (in German)
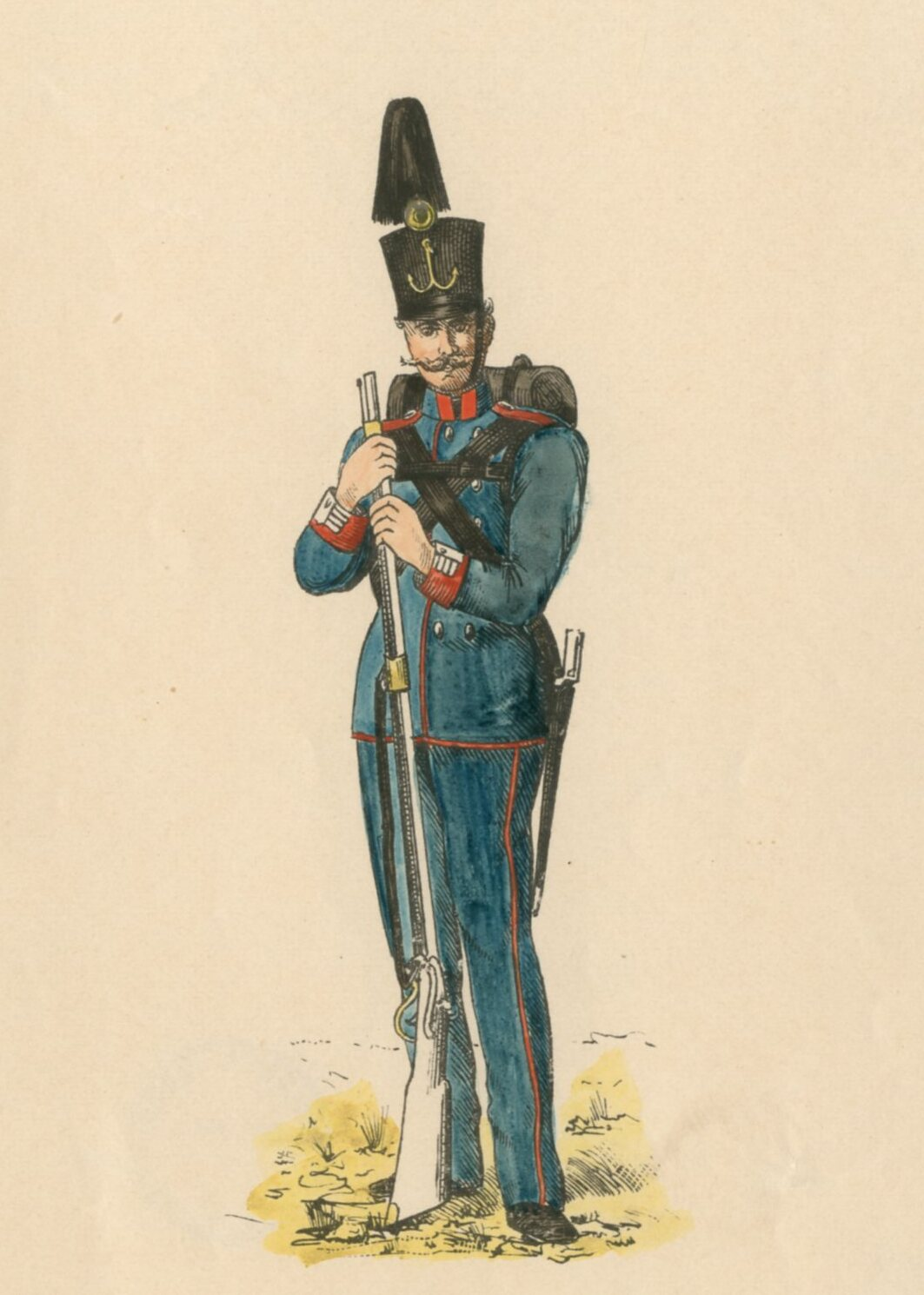
- A Šajkaš in uniform, 1849
- Active: 1475–1873
- Allegiance: Kingdom of Hungary (1475–1526); Habsburg Empire (1526–1746; 1763–1873)
- Branch: River Flotilla
- Role: Defence of Danube and Sava, pontonier and pioneer duties
- Colors: Blue
- Engagements: War of the First Coalition; Flanders campaign; Italian campaign; Siege of Mantua; War of the Second Coalition; German campaign; War of the Third Coalition; War of the Fifth Coalition; War of the Seventh Coalition; Neapolitan War; Second Italian War of Independence; Battle of Solferino

Šajkaši (In Serbian, Serbian Cyrillic: шајкаши, German: Tschaikisten) refers to the river flotilla troops guarding the Danube and Sava, and especially, the Port of Belgrade, against the Ottoman Empire from the 16th to the 19th century. During that period, the rivers were natural borders of the Kingdom of Hungary and Habsburg monarchy with the Ottoman Empire, part of the Military Frontier. The troops were composed of ethnic Serbs, who had special military status. Their name derives from the small wooden boat known as chaika (šajka, tschaiken), a type of galley.

== Organization ==
=== Personal armament ===
The Šajkaši were armed with sabres, spears and ordinary and mechanical arrows. Sometimes they wore helmets and shields. Their spears likely were longer than ordinary, set to be used at longer distances. They used arrows until the end of the 16th century when the arquebus had been perfected. Later, when gunpowder began to be widely used, the Šajkaši were armed with sabres, long spears and muskets.

=== Warship armament ===
Late 15th and 16th century

In 1475, King Matthias had in his Danube Flotilla around 330 chaika with 10,000 men, among which were 1,700 lancers, 1,200 men-at-arms, while "the rest were catapultists and crossbowers". In the Belgrade port, 34 chaika with 18 oars, 18 soldiers and a catapult at the front were stationed. Larger chaika, of which there were 16, had 24 oars and 300-man-crew, 4 large guns at the front, "from which 100-pounds of weight of shots, 100 carbott or pisside (types of shells), and 200 hand-guns, were shot". Apart from the ordinary chaika, there were larger ones, called "galleys".

=== Clothing ===
Their clothing was in dark-blue colour.

=== Ranks ===
Hungary, 16th century

- The supreme commanders of Šajkaši commands in Hungarian service were called vajd (from vojvoda). These were usually selected – retired Šajkaši would choose four candidates, of which the captain would choose one for the command. There were instances when the vajd was appointed, but this right, it seems, was only held by the monarch. The vajd stayed in his position until death. The number of vajds was never determined, and it varied depending on the sizes of the Šajkaši crews. There were usually 20–40. In 1521, in Belgrade, there were only 3, while in Varadin 7, and in Slankamen 5. In 1537, there were 17 vajds in Komárom, down to 7 in 1546. The vajd usually served at one place, but there were instances when he was transferred.

== History ==
=== 16th century ===
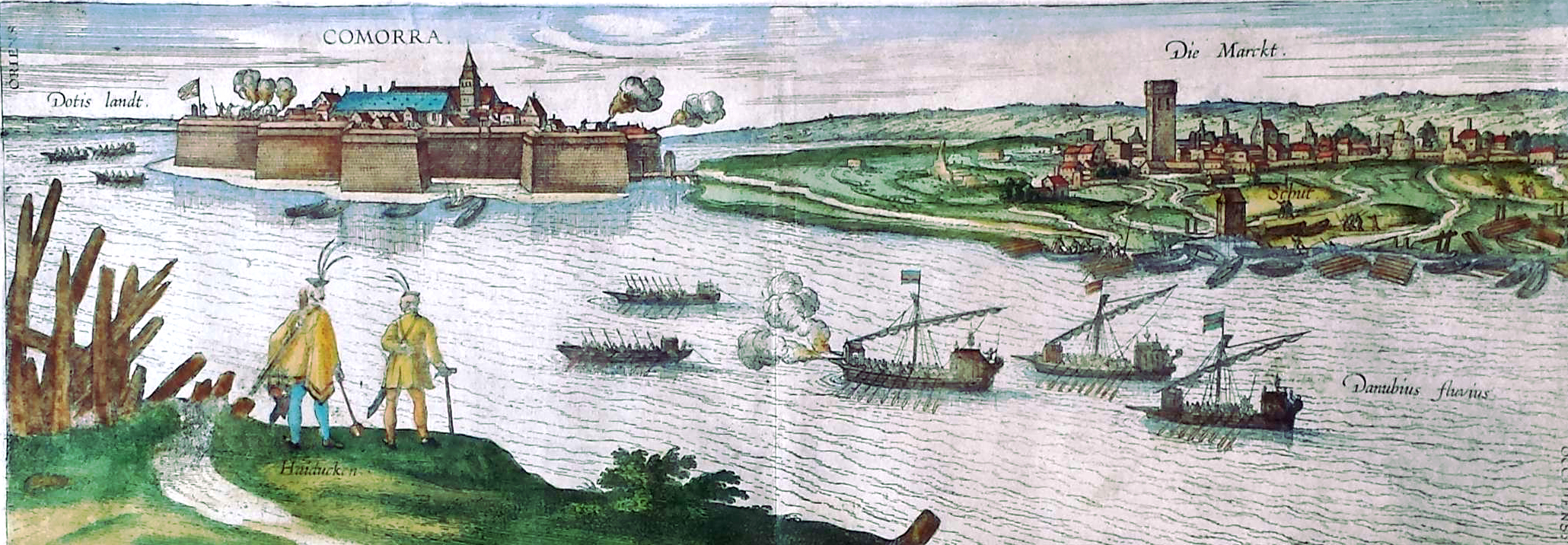
View of Komárno with chaikas, 1597.

Pavle Bakić commanded the Šajkaši in the service of Ferdinand, the Archduke of Austria and King of Hungary and Croatia. The Šajkaši participated in the Battle of Mohács (1526). After the battle the Šajkaši were still unpaid for their services. Ferdinand reprimanded the court for not having paid at least part of the unpaid salary to the Šajkaši. Bakić once again turned to Ferdinand, alerting him that the nonpayment to the Šajkaši would cause estrangement of the Serbs in his lands, and those of Zapolya and the Ottoman Empire. He also informed Ferdinand of the persecution of Serbs by the Austrian staff and officers.

=== 17th century ===
From all the writings in Serbian and German by the estimable Archimandrite Jovan Rajić (Johann Raics, 1726–1801), it has been established that the old Šajkaš Corps had their staff in the city of Komárno (Comorn, Hungarian: Komorom) which is along the upper Danube and that the personnel were under the Hungarian and Polish king Ladislaus III (1424–1444) and those following him until they were included under the rule of Leopold I (1640–1705).

The old Šajkaš Corps was established in 1526 and dissolved in 1746.

By far the majority of the Šajkaši were Serbs who had come north and west as direct result of the Turkish advance into the Balkans. As Ottoman conquest continued throughout the 1500s, thousands fled north across the Danube into lands vacated by the Serbs, also moving away from the Turks. In addition, thousands of refugees, generally of the Orthodox faith, had entered the largely deserted lands of northern Medieval Serbia where few of the original natives had survived the brutal wars. These Serbs formed the nucleus of the military frontiersmen, beginning in the early 1500s, and of the river fleet, the Šajkaši formations.

In 1690, a major Serbian immigration took place. Some 30,000 families from Kosovo sought refuge across the Sava and Danube rivers among their kin folk after the Austrian supported revolt failed and left them defenceless in the face of Ottoman reprisals.

=== 18th century ===
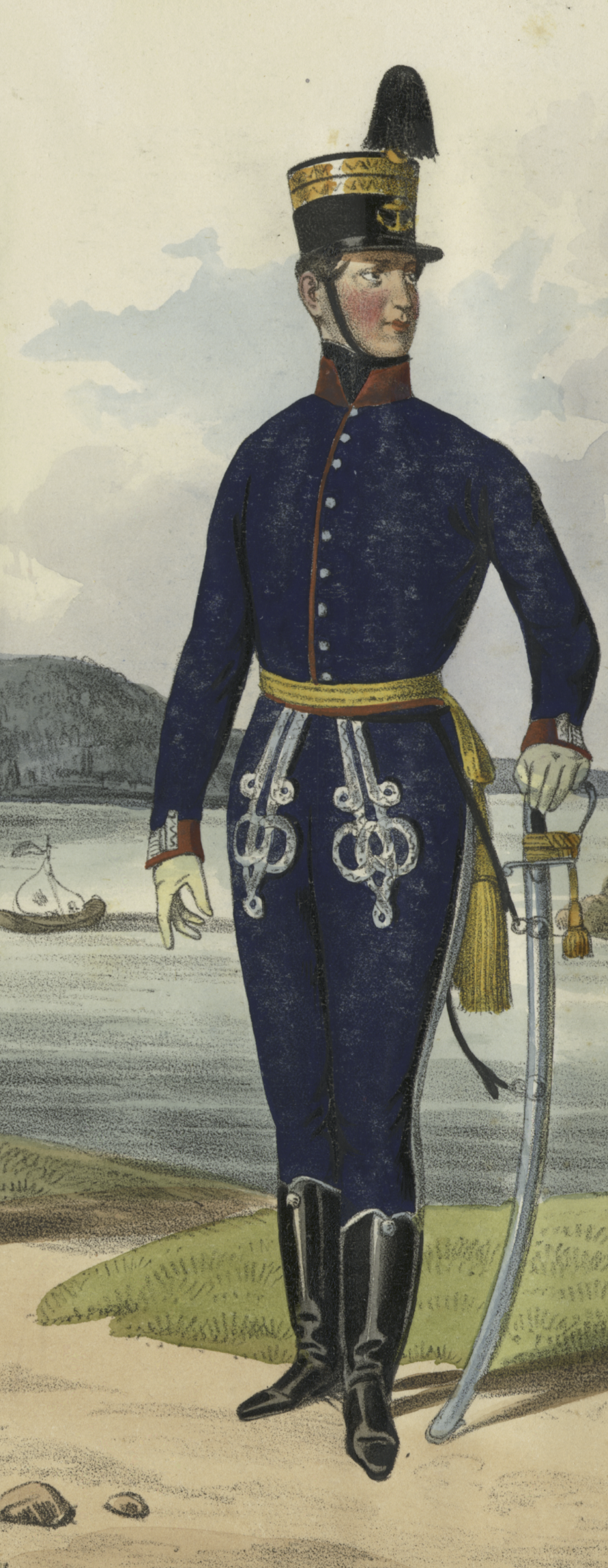
Czaikisten officer, early 19th century

These newly arrived Serbs together with the members of the earlier Šajkaši Corps formed the new Šajkaši Battalion on the lower Danube. They defended the border between the Habsburg and Ottoman empires.

Like the other regiments of the Austrian Military Frontier, the Šajkaši settled the deserted borderlands designated for them by the Austrian crown in exchange for military service. The Šajkaši battalion's first lower Danube villages were: Titel, Lok, Mošorin (Moschorin), Vilovo (Willova), Gardinovci (Gardinovatz) and Žabalj (Zsablia, formerly Josefdorf).

Six more villages were authorized on 7 June 1769: Čurug, Gospođinci, Šajkaš (St. Ivan), Upper Kovilj, Lower Kovilj, and Kać (Kaacs). In 1800 and 1801, two more -- Djurdjevo and Nadalj—were also settled. On 1 January 1809, the battalion totaled six companies (a division).

This battalion, along the model of the other regiments of the Military Frontier, was organized according to the standing order of the Austrian military-civil administration. The duties of and support for the battalion's frontiersmen were the same as all other frontiersmen.

A history of the Šajkaš Battalion was written between 1842 and 1847 by one of its officers, Captain Jovan Trumić. Apparently the only surviving copy is now at the Serbian scholarly society, Matica srpska, in Novi Sad.

The original Trumić manuscript and other documents about the Šajkaši were brought to light in 2004 by Slavko Gavrilović, a Serbian scholar who specialized in the Šajkaš Battalion.

Included in Captain Trumić's study are valuable statistics from 1844. There were 30,315 inhabitants on the lands of the Šajkaš Battalion at that time: 28,656 Serbs; 758 Germans; 528 Hungarians; 196 Wallachians; and 177 others. Within the jurisdiction of the battalion, there were 28,275 Eastern Orthodox Christians (Non-Uniates, mostly Serbs); 1,627 Roman Catholics (includes Croatians); 329 Protestant Evangelists (Lutherans); 63 Uniates; and 21 Protestant Reformed (Calvinists).

Among the additional documents Slavko Gavrilović published in 2004 is a list of the officers who served in the Šajka Battalion between 1762 and 1873. Captain Trumić is among them.

A total of 246 Serbian officers are listed. The list is interesting today for the large number of Serbian officers and for the details about their military service which provide information about the officers of both the Šajkaš Battalion and the Military Frontier.

The list is chronological. The dates and places correspond not only to assignments within the Military Frontier but also to postings in far-away wars waged by the Habsburg crown. The list reveals that these officers were transferred to those wars.

After 1699, the service of the military frontiersmen was not limited to protecting the Habsburg Empire from the Ottomans. They were required, by regulation, to serve where called. The high command in Vienna viewed the Military Frontier as a vast pool of self-sufficient recruits for the Austrian military, and their participation in the major wars involving the Austrian crown seems to bear this out. The Šajkaš (Tschaikisten) Battalion of the Austrian fleet at the lower Danube was created in 1763 by Habsburg empress Maria Theresa. It was abolished by Austrian emperor Franz Joseph in 1872.

A contingent of the Tschaikisten battalion (Kommando Tschaikisten) was part of the Austrian pioneer battalion in the Low Countries theatre of the War of the First Coalition. The battalion also participated in the Italian campaign of the war and its personnel were among the defending Austrian forces at the Siege of Mantua in 1796–97. In 1799-1800, during the War of the Second Coalition, units of the Tschaikisten formed part of the Lake Constance flotilla of the Austrian military which participated in the campaign in Southwestern Germany.

=== 19th century ===
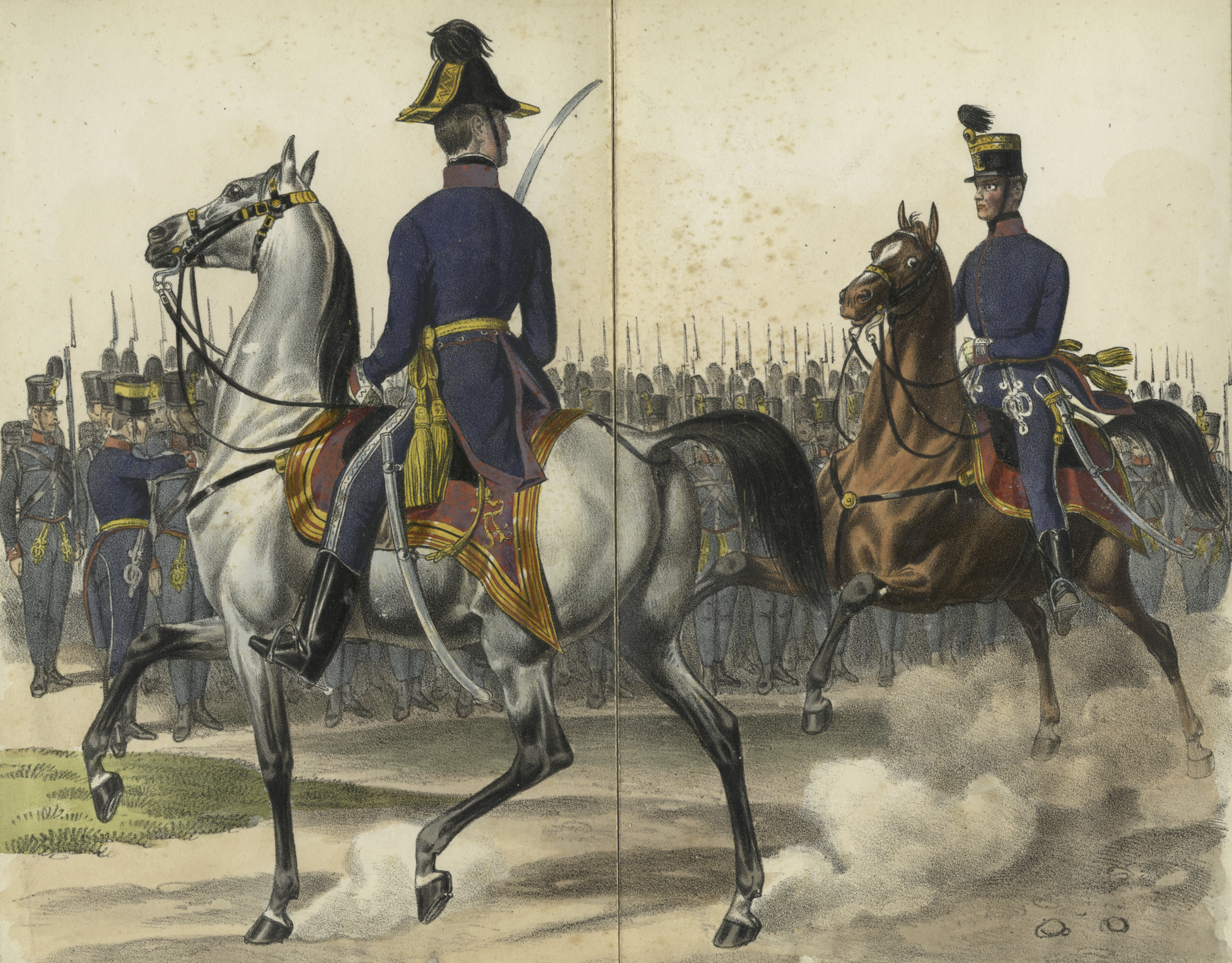
Officers of the Czaikisten Battalion in parade dress

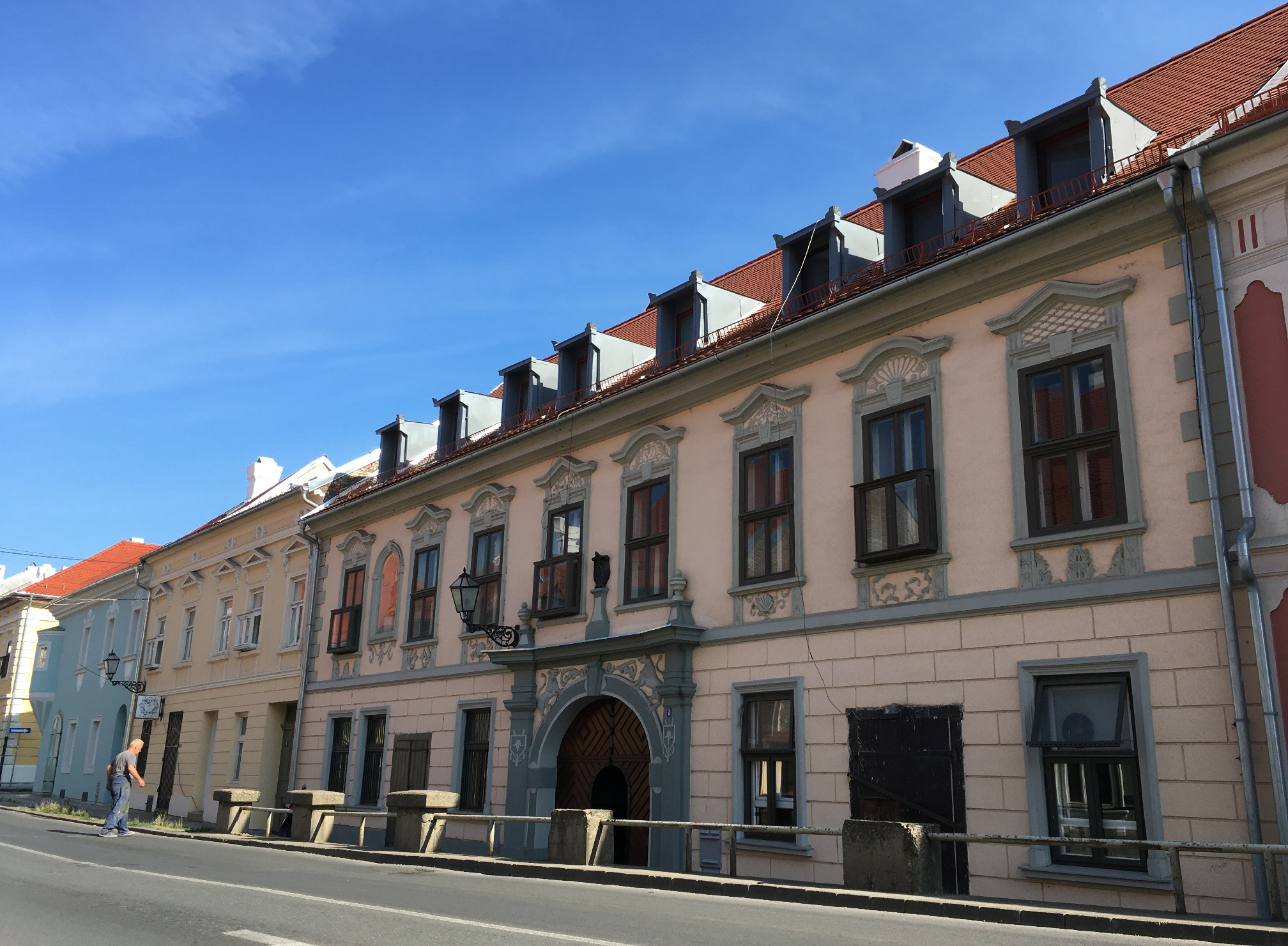
The Czaikisten battalion headquarters in Petrovaradin

During the Hundred Days in 1815, two companies of the battalion were deployed to Italy and three to Germany. The companies deployed to Italy formed part of the army corps commanded by Laval Nugent von Westmeath during the Neapolitan War.

Of the Battalion's Serbian officers, 89 were promoted from the ranks of non-commissioned officers. Sixty came from several of the Military Frontier's other regiments which were either named for the regimental headquarter cities—Brod, Gradiska, Ogulin, Otocac, Petrovaradin, Slunj, Titel and Varazdin—or regions of the Military Frontier -- Banat, Banija, Lika, and Slavonia. Some were cadets or arrived fresh from the Military Frontier School in Vienna.

The Trumić list includes the year the officers joined the battalion and his rank and prior post. Also shown are each officer's promotions and the year he was transferred out of the battalion as well as his rank and new post.

A staggering number of Grenz infantry were called up to the Austrian engagements in various European wars, such as the Austrian War of Succession (1741–1748); the Seven Years' War (1756–1763); the Bavarian War of Succession (1778–1779); the wars against post-revolutionary France (1792–1800); the Napoleonic Wars (1805–1815); the Austrian-Italian wars (1848–1849, 1859, 1866) and the Revolutions of 1848–1849 against the Hungarians.

Postings on the list include places in northern Italy, Mantua and Solferino, made famous in the Napoleonic Wars and in the Austro-Italian Wars. According to the list, Lieutenant Michael Stanisavljević was transferred to Mantua in 1784 and Captain Marcus Rajčević was killed in the Battle of Solferino in 1859.

During the Austro-Turkish War of 1788–1791, the Austrians organized Serbian volunteers into special military force known as the Serbian Free Corps (Frei Corps), usually commanded by Austrian officers of Serbian descent. From the Šajkaš Battalion, Adjutant George Bešanović transferred to the Bosnian-Serbian Frei Corps in 1788.

Lieutenant Gligorije Popović and Lieutenant Thimotie Zivković transferred to Count Gyulay's Frei Corps in 1793. Lieutenant Arsenije Sečujac transferred to the 3rd Serbian Frei Crops Battalion in 1813.

Thirty-five were transferred to other regiments of the Military Frontier. Fifty-one died while in serving in the battalion, but whether the death was in line of duty is not specified. Seventy-seven retired from the battalion with pensions. The length of service varied from a few months to as many as 30 years, if not more.

Several Serbs became majors, colonels and battalion commanders. In 1763, the year the Šajkaš Battalion was created, Theodor Stanisavljević was a Major and the battalion commander of the Petrovaradin Frontier Infantry Regiment. In 1773, he was Colonel in the Šajkaš Battalion. He died in 1783.

Colonel Aron Stanisavljević, in 1813 after 35 years with the battalion, was promoted to brigadier general and Major-General and transferred to Banat. That same year, Lieutenant Colonel Johann Nepomuk Majdić became battalion commander.

In 1816, Captain Thimotie Zivković returned to the battalion and was promoted to colonel and battalion commander. In 1835, Colonel Franz Jankovic was appointed major general and commander of the Supreme Shipping Office in Vienna.

In 1849, Major Johann Bunčić was the battalion commander of the Ogulin Frontier Regiment and adjutant to the Austrian-Serbian Army Corps when he joined the Sajkas Battalion. The next year, he was transferred to the Petrovaradin Frontier Infantry Regiment as a colonel.

=== Šajkaši Battalion ===
The Frontier Šajkaši Battalion (Krajiški šajkaški bataljon), known in German as Czaikisten-Bataillon, was active in the period of 1763–1873. After the Treaty of Belgrade (1739) the Habsburg-Ottoman border was set up on the Danube and Sava rivers. The Šajkaši bands in Komárno, Esztergom, Győr and other places were abolished, until the establishment of the Šajkaši Battalion in Bačka, between the Danube and Tisa, in 1763 upon decision of the Habsburg War Council. The Serb colonising community which was employed into the battalion (the šajkaši) was given the Šajkaška region, which initially included six villages, eventually increased by eight. The battalion headquarters were in Titel. The battalion had four bands in 1769, with ca. 1,116 men, although it was constantly expanded.

== Šajkaši migrations ==
Šajkaši families, Serbs, settled in Esztergom during the rule of Matthias Corvinus, a settlement in the lower town developed from the community, called Srpska varoš.

A group of Serbian Šajkaši settled in Slovakia, where they continued their service, known in Slovak as čajkári.

== Legacy ==
In Hungarian war annals the most clear and also most vulnerable place is taken by the king's Šajkaši. They were the most important factors and participants of the victories of the Royal Army. Whenever there was a threat to Hungary, the Šajkaši were the main support of the territorial defence and the most reliable aid to the Royal Army.

Stationed at many locations, the most important Šajkaši units were those of Komárom, as this was the most important Imperial fortress in Hungary; they were stationed here up until the reign of Maria Theresa, when they were moved to South Bačka.

The šajkača hat is derived from the 18th-century Šajkaši in Banat.

== Notable people ==
- Stefan Štiljanović (fl. 1498–d. 1543)
- Radič Božić (fl. 1502–d. 1528)
- Petar Ovčarević (fl. 1521–41)
- Pavle Bakić (fl. 1525–d. 1537)
- Mihailo Ovčarević (fl. 1550–79)
- Vuk Stančić (fl. 1594)
- Aron Stanisavljević von Wellenstreit (1753–1833)

== See also ==
- Šajkaška, a region named after the military unit
- Šajkaš, a village named after the military unit
- Serbian Militia
- Serbian River Flotilla, a tactical brigade sized brown water naval branch of the Serbian Army headquartered in Novi Sad

== Annotations ==
Another term used in German was Nassadisten (Serbian: насадисте/nasadiste).

== Sources ==
- Kolundžija, Zoran (2008). Vojvodina: Od najstarijih vremena do velike seobe. Prometej. ISBN 9788651503064.
- Popović, Dušan J. (1990). Srbi u Vojvodini. Vol. 1. Matica srpska. ISBN 9788636301746.
- Samardžić, Radovan; Veselinović, Rajko L.; Popović, Toma (1993). Radovan Samardžić (ed.). Istorija srpskog naroda. Treća knjiga, prvi tom: Srbi pod tuđinskom vlašću 1537-1699. Belgrade: Srpska književna zadruga.
