= Titelski Breg =

Geological formation in Serbia

Тitelski Breg
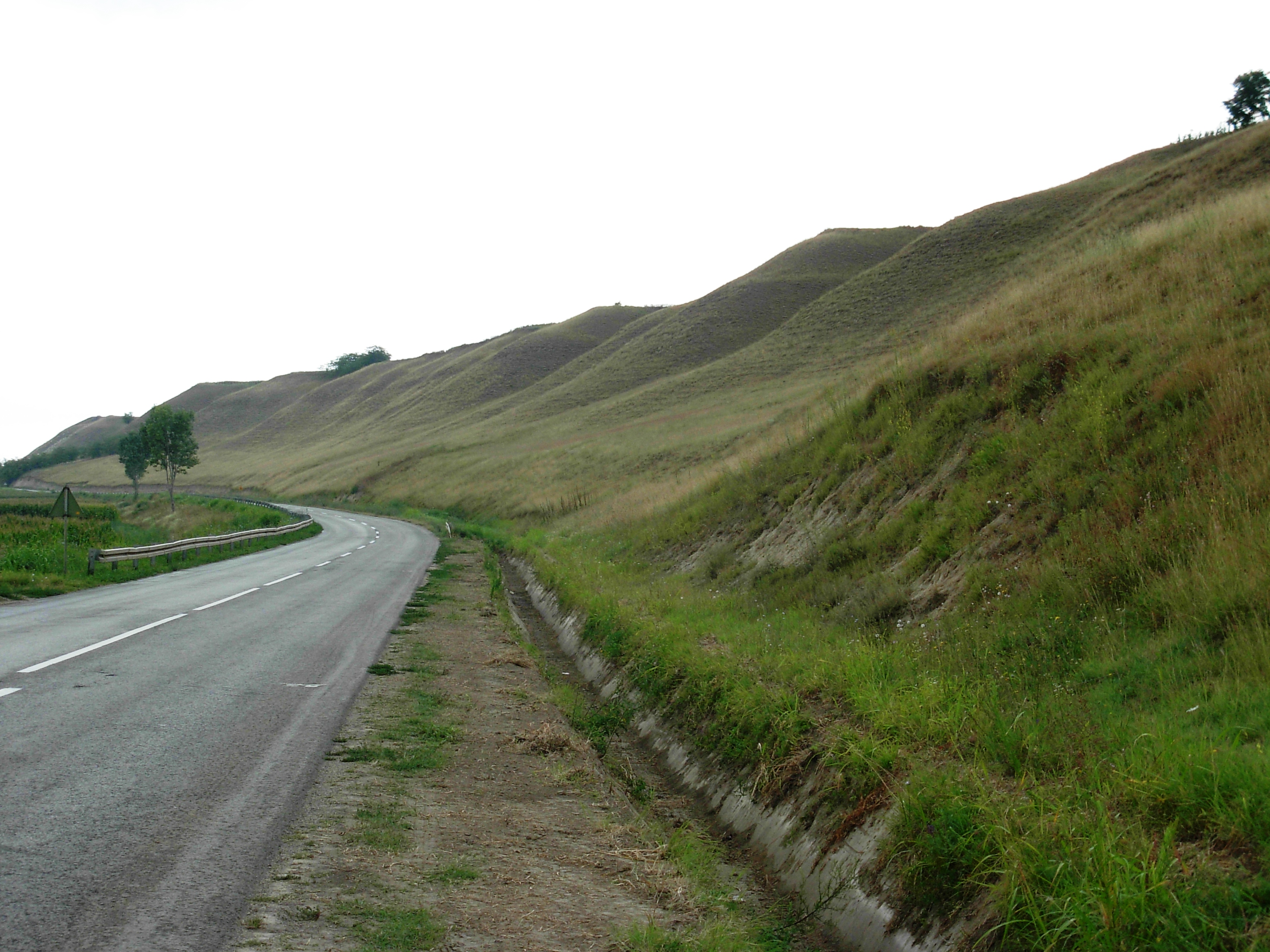
- Titel Hill

Highest point
- Elevation: 128 m (420 ft)
- Coordinates: 45°14′50″N 20°14′23″E

Geography
- Location within Serbia
- Location: Bačka, Serbia

Titelski Breg (Serbian Cyrillic: Тителски брег) or Titel Hill is a protected loess plateau in the Vojvodina province of northern Serbia. The elliptical formation is approximately 18 kilometres long and 7.5 kilometres wide, with elevations ranging from 72.5 to 130 metres above sea level. It is bounded by the Tisza to the east and by the settlements of Titel, Lok, Vilovo, Šajkaš and Mošorin to the south, west and north. The plateau contains steep cliffs and gullies, as well as areas of grassland vegetation.

Titelski Breg is designated as a Special Nature Reserve and is classified as an IUCN Category IV protected area. Botanical surveys have recorded 672 vascular plant taxa in the reserve. The plateau also contains archaeological remains, including the Bronze Age fortified settlement of Feudvar associated with the Vatin culture.

== Background ==
Titelski Breg is a Special Nature Reserve in the Vojvodina Province of northern Serbia. It comprises an isolated ellipsoid loess hill—approximately 18 km (11 mi) long and 7.5 km (4.7 mi) wide—with elevations ranging from 72.5 to 130 m (238 to 427 ft) above sea level. Bounded to the east by the Tisa River and to the south, west and north by the settlements of Titel, Lok, Vilovo, Šajkaš and Mošorin, the plateau terminates in steep cliffs and gullies where open grassland vegetation has persisted. Decades of botanical, geological and geomorphological research since 1896 highlighted the site's uniqueness, leading to its legal protection in 2009 as a category I protected area of exceptional national importance under Serbian law and its recognition as an IUCN category V landscape. Active management—including periodic grazing, mowing and removal of invasive species—has been carried out to conserve its valuable steppe habitats and prevent ecological succession.

The plateau was the site of Bronze Age settlements, in particular, the large fortified settlement of Feudvar belonging to the Vatin culture.

== Biodiversity ==
Historically, successive botanical surveys (1896–1990) and literature compilations (1972–2022) recorded 672 vascular plant taxa in the reserve. Fieldwork, conducted between October 2022 and October 2023, across 11 priority localities documented 24 taxa new to Titelski Breg—comprising 18 species, five subspecies and one variety—including both native forbs and grasses and four invasive aliens: Ailanthus altissima, Ipomoea purpurea, Solanum nigrum subsp. schultesii and Symphyotrichum lanceolatum. The grassland matrix is dominated by Pannonian loess steppe (EU Habitats Directive code 6250), which supports several relic species of conservation concern—such as Adonis vernalis, Crocus variegatus, and Sternbergia colchiciflora—some of which are listed under CITES or Annex II of the Habitats Directive but have not been observed locally for decades. Forest fragments, marshes and reedbeds occur in minor proportion. Continued monitoring and targeted management are essential to safeguard the reserve's floristic biodiversity and associated ecosystem services.

== Visitor access and sustainable tourism ==
Titelski Breg is botanically and geologically important and is a sustainable‑tourism destination. The 496 ha reserve sits within an 8643 ha buffer zone and is classified as IUCN Category IV, making it both a strict nature reserve and a managed habitat/visitor area. Its road connections to Serbia's major cities—and proximity to Hungary and Romania—attract domestic and international visitation.

== Resident and visitor satisfaction ==
A 2024 survey of 630 people (400 local residents, 230 visitors) used the "Prism of Sustainability" model to assess four pillars of SuT in Titelski Breg—ecological, economic, sociocultural and institutional. Overall satisfaction was high (mean scores of 4.03 for residents and 3.85 for visitors on a 5‑point scale). Of the four dimensions, ecological and sociocultural factors ranked strongest in shaping positive perceptions, while institutional factors (e.g. trained guides, visitor information centres) scored lowest, suggesting a need for more formal interpretation and community‑led guiding services.

== Gallery ==
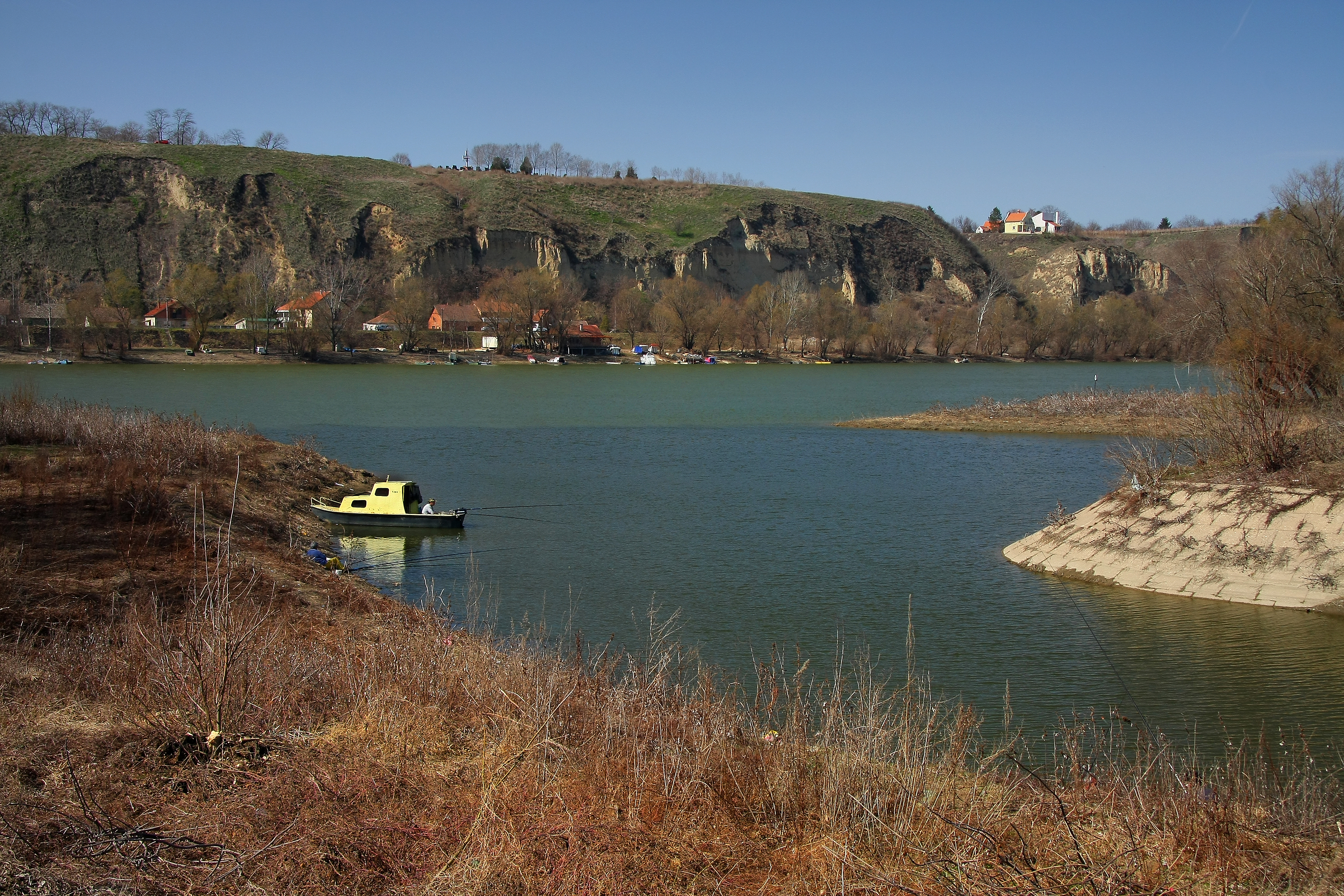

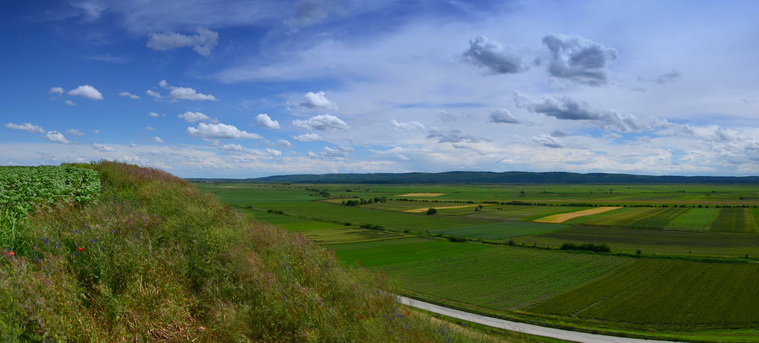

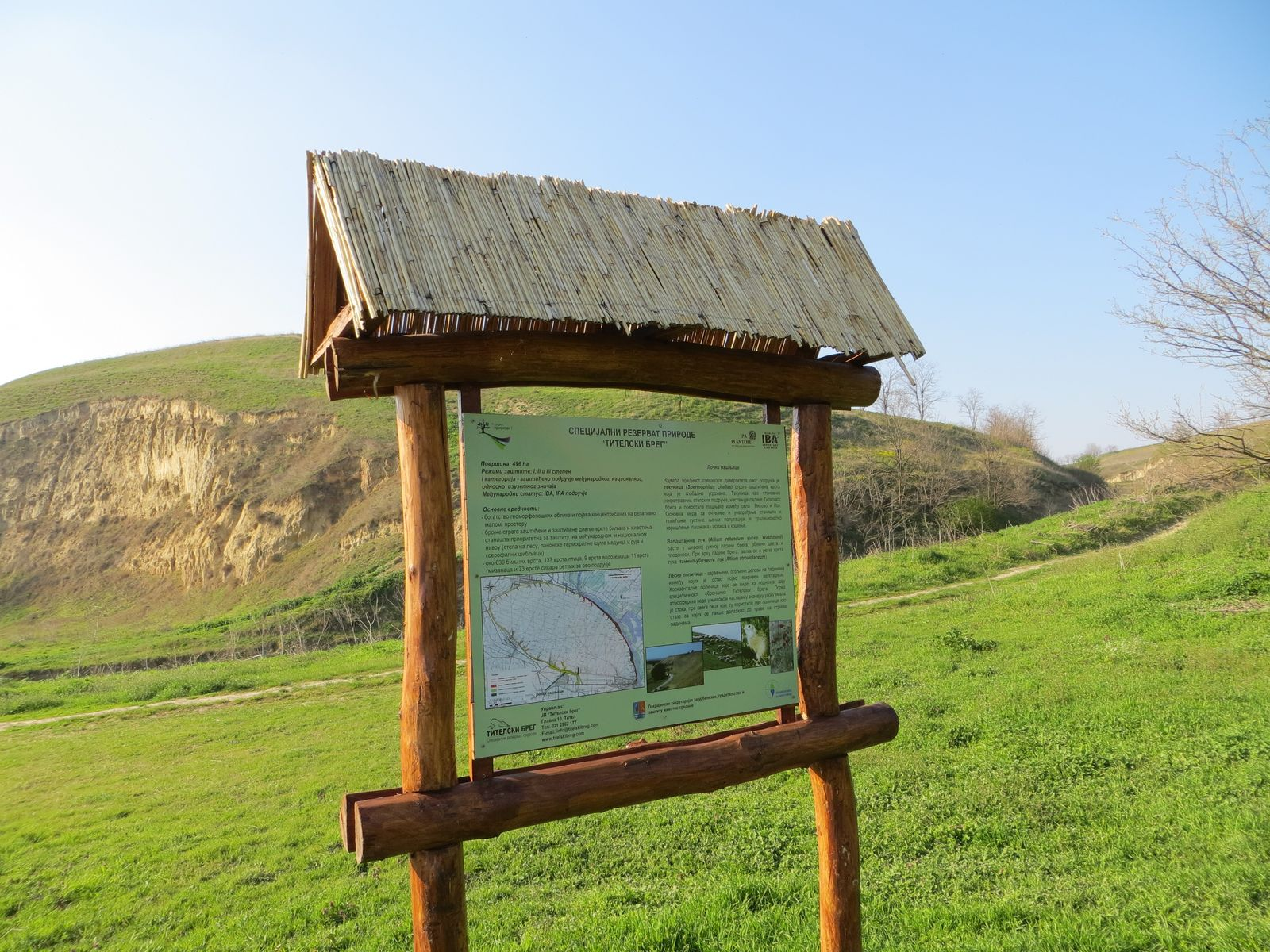

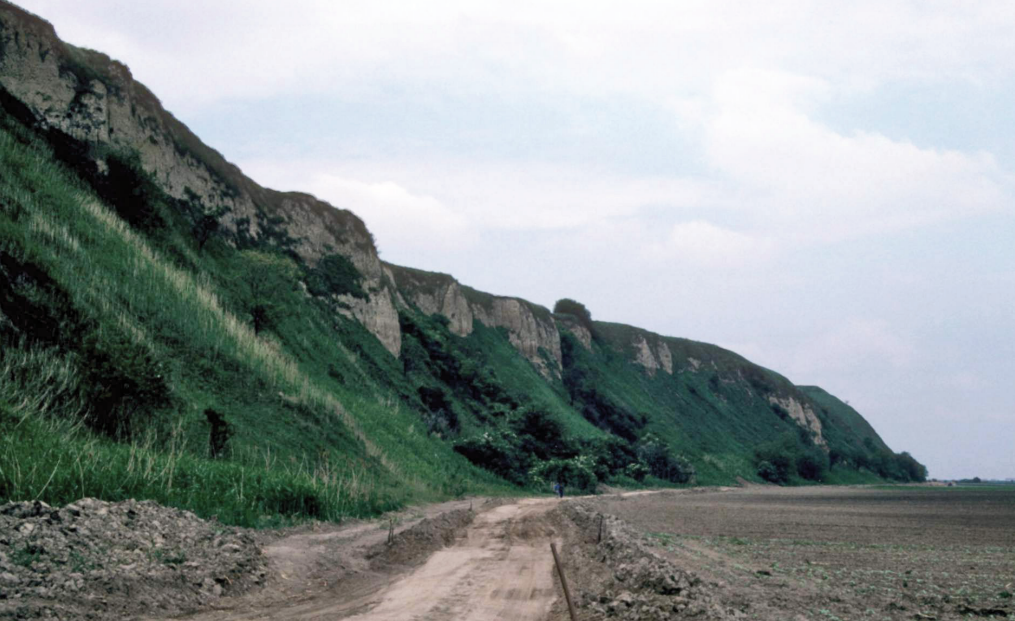

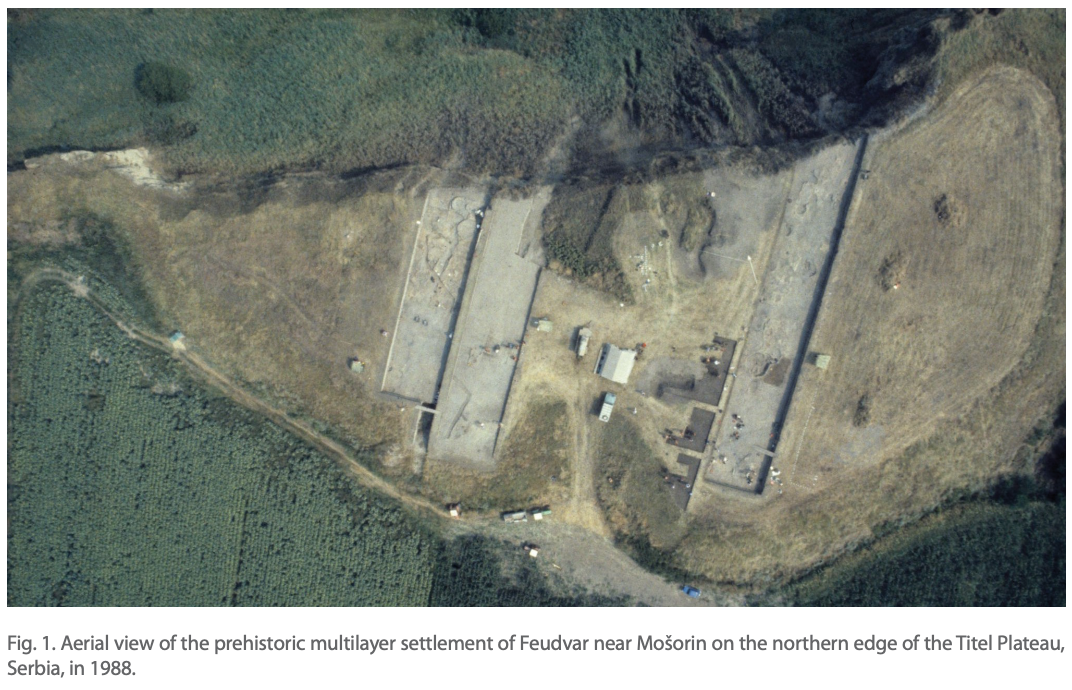
Aerial view of the Feudvar Bronze Age settlement site

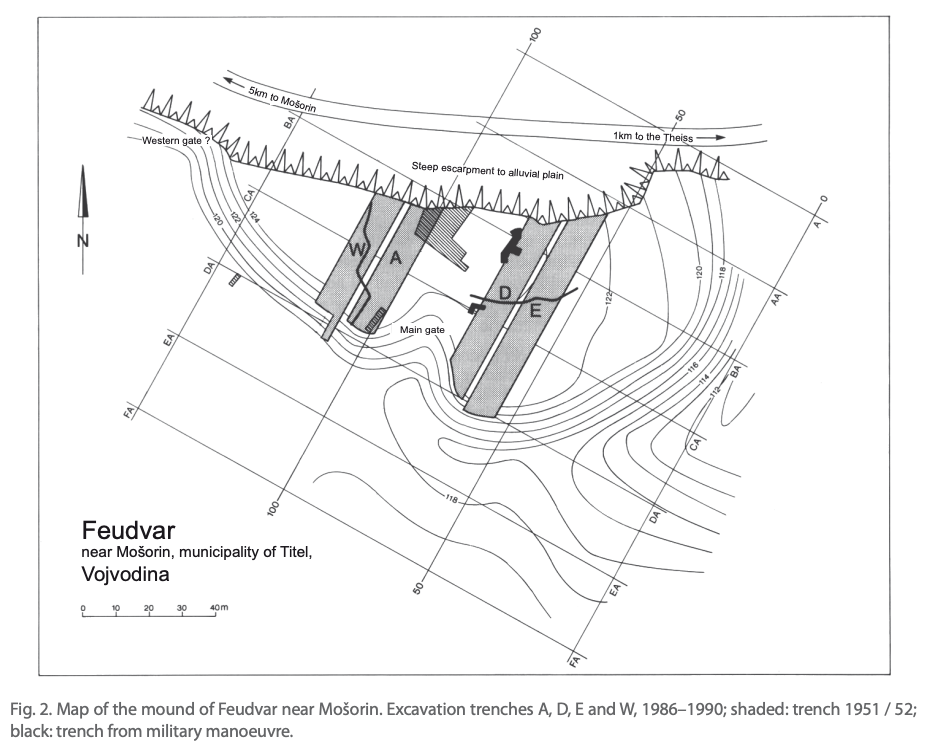
Map of the Fedvar site

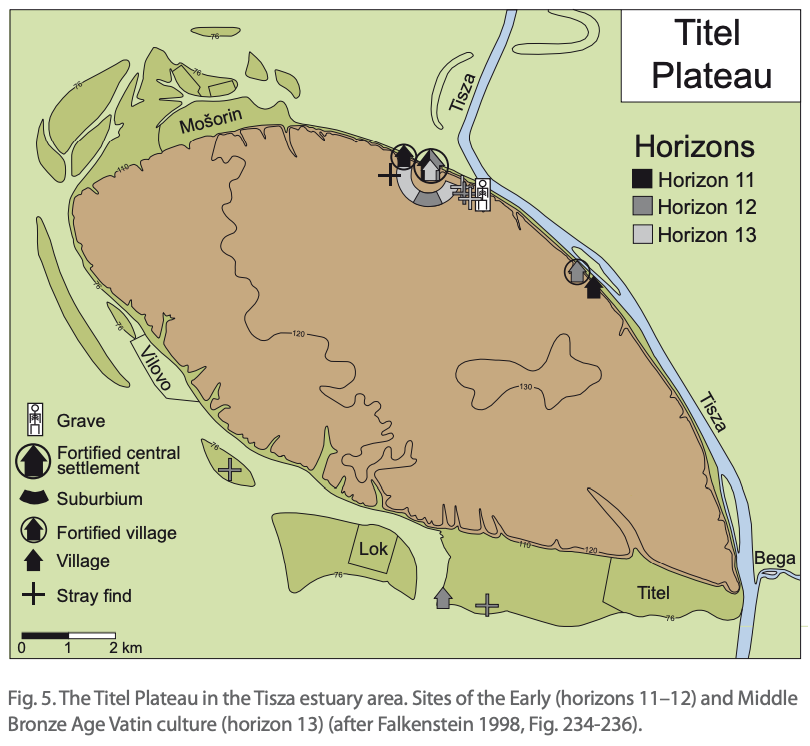
The Plateau in the Early and Middle Bronze Age (Vatin culture)

== See also ==
- Šajkaška
- Bačka
