= Island of Krčedin =

River island in Serbia

Island of Krčedin Krčedinska Ada
Native name: Крчединска ада Krčedinska ada
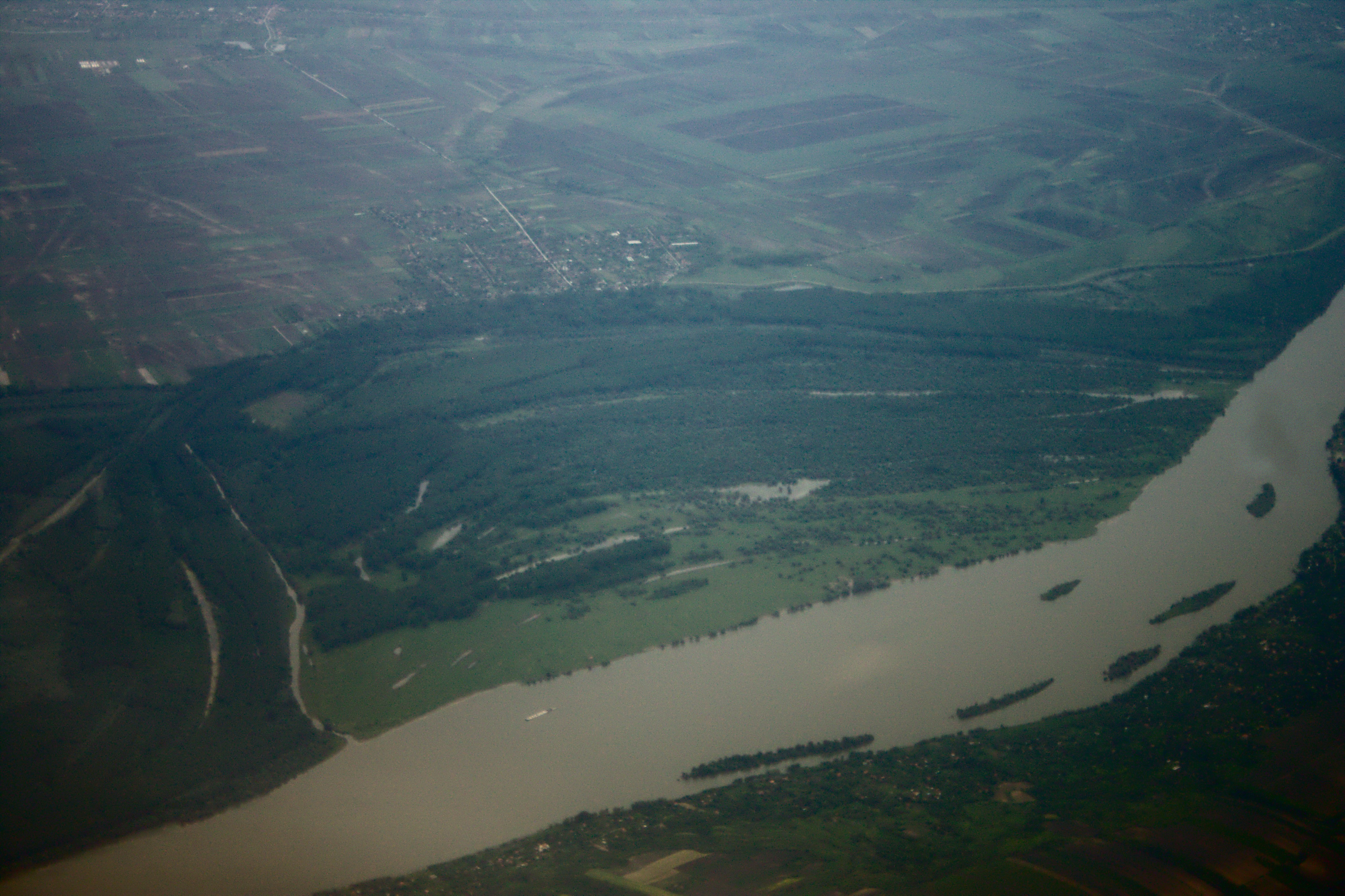
- Aerial view of the island. The village of Gardinovci is just north of it

- Location within Serbia

Geography
- Location: Krčedin
- Coordinates: 45.182060°N 20.123005°E
- Area: 800 ha (2,000 acres)
- Highest elevation: 75 m (246 ft)

Administration
- Serbia
- Autonomous Province of Vojvodina: Municipality of Inđija

Demographics
- Population: uninhabited

Island of Krčedin or Krčedinska Ada (Serbian: Крчединска ада) is a river island in Serbia. It is located on the left bank of the Danube across the village of Krčedin, in the municipality of Inđija, Autonomous Province of Vojvodina. The uninhabited island is part of the Special Natural Reserve "Koviljsko-Petrovaradinski Rit". It is one of the largest remaining natural pastures in the Podunavlje, known for the traditional stock breeding, with only basic human interference.

== Location ==
The island stretches approximately between the Danube's 1,226 and 1,231 km (762 and 765 mi), on the river's left bank. Across the Danube, a bit further from the bank, is the village of Krčedin, after which the island was named. Though it is geographically in the Bačka region, administratively it belongs to the municipality of Inđija (as does the village), in the Syrmia region. Right north of the island, closer than the village of Krčedin, is the village of Gardinovci, in the municipality of Titel. Just west of the island the Beška Bridge crosses the Danube while to the northeast are the village of Kovilj and the Kovilj Monastery.

== Geography ==
The island is roughly shaped as a rounded triangle, with the top on the north. It is located in the valley of the Danube and on the east extends into the micro-region of Kožjak, within the Marsh of Kovilj (Koviljski Rit). It was created when the Danube shifted its course to the south and cut through its own meander curving around the northern slope of the 269-metre-high (883 ft) Koševac Hill on the Syrmian side, northeast of the village of Krečedin. It appears as if being embedded into the Bačka mainland and the narrow arm of the Danube which separates it from the land is called Dunavac ("Little Danube") on the west and Arm of Gardinovac on the east side. This arm then branches into numerous smaller arms and ponds. Still, during the normal water level, majority of the island remains dry, while most of it got flooded during the rainy season and high water levels. The highest point on the island is 75 m (246 ft).

The island is 5 km (3.1 mi) long, 3 km (1.9 mi) wide and covers an area of 8 km^{2} (3.1 sq mi).

Across the river, to the west, are two archaeological sites, Kalakača and Mihaljevačka šuma.

== Plant life ==
The island is rich in fresh water and grass. It is also partially forested, mostly by the willows, some of which originate from c. 1810s.

== Wildlife ==
The arm which separates the island from the mainland is a rich, natural spawning area for common carp, northern pike, Prussian carp and sterlet. The island of Krčedin is one of the largest spawning areas of common carp in Europe.

Birds inhabiting the island include storks, herons, mallards and cormorants. In total, there are 172 bird species on the island, of which 103 are declared rare. Among them are the white tailed eagle, great white heron, black stork, Eurasian eagle-owl and saker falcon.

During the hot summers and the low water level, the Dunavac partially dries up, so the island can be visited by bicycle. The natural bridge is also, albeit rarely, used by wild animals to reach the island, like deer, jackals or wild boars.

== Husbandry ==
The villagers from Krčedin were the first who began transporting their livestock to the island, by the ferries, in the 19th century. They were later followed by the inhabitants of other neighboring villages: Kovilj, Šajkaš, Gardinovci, Čortanovci, Stari Slankamen. The animals are transported in the early spring and left until the late autumn to live completely freely as the island is uninhabited, without natural predators and with preserved natural habitat since it is undisturbed by the urban development. The livestock includes horses, sheep, cattle, pigs and donkeys. The well fed animals and their young born on the island are returned to the mainland, into the stables only when it gets too cold or rainy, though horses and pigs are sometimes left on the island even during the winter. Some rare breeds, like the mangalica pigs, local breed of the shepherd dog pulin or the Podolian cattle are also kept on the island, and so are hens, turkeys and peacocks. There were 80 Podolians in 2017, out of 400 in the entire Serbia.

As of 2017 the island numbered 1,000 cattle and pigs, 200 horses and over 100 Balkan donkeys. Donkeys are becoming more and more popular, due to the high prices of their milk. In the 1990s however, over 6,000 animals were kept on the island.

== Tourism ==
The island is part of a much larger Special Natural Reserve "Koviljsko-Petrovaradinski Rit", a wetland along the Danube. Municipality organizes photo safari-like tours to the island from May to September. They are conceived as one-day excursions with the small groups of visitors.
