= Church of the Dormition of the Theotokos, Titel =

Church of the Dormition of the Theotokos
- Црква Успења Пресвете Богородице
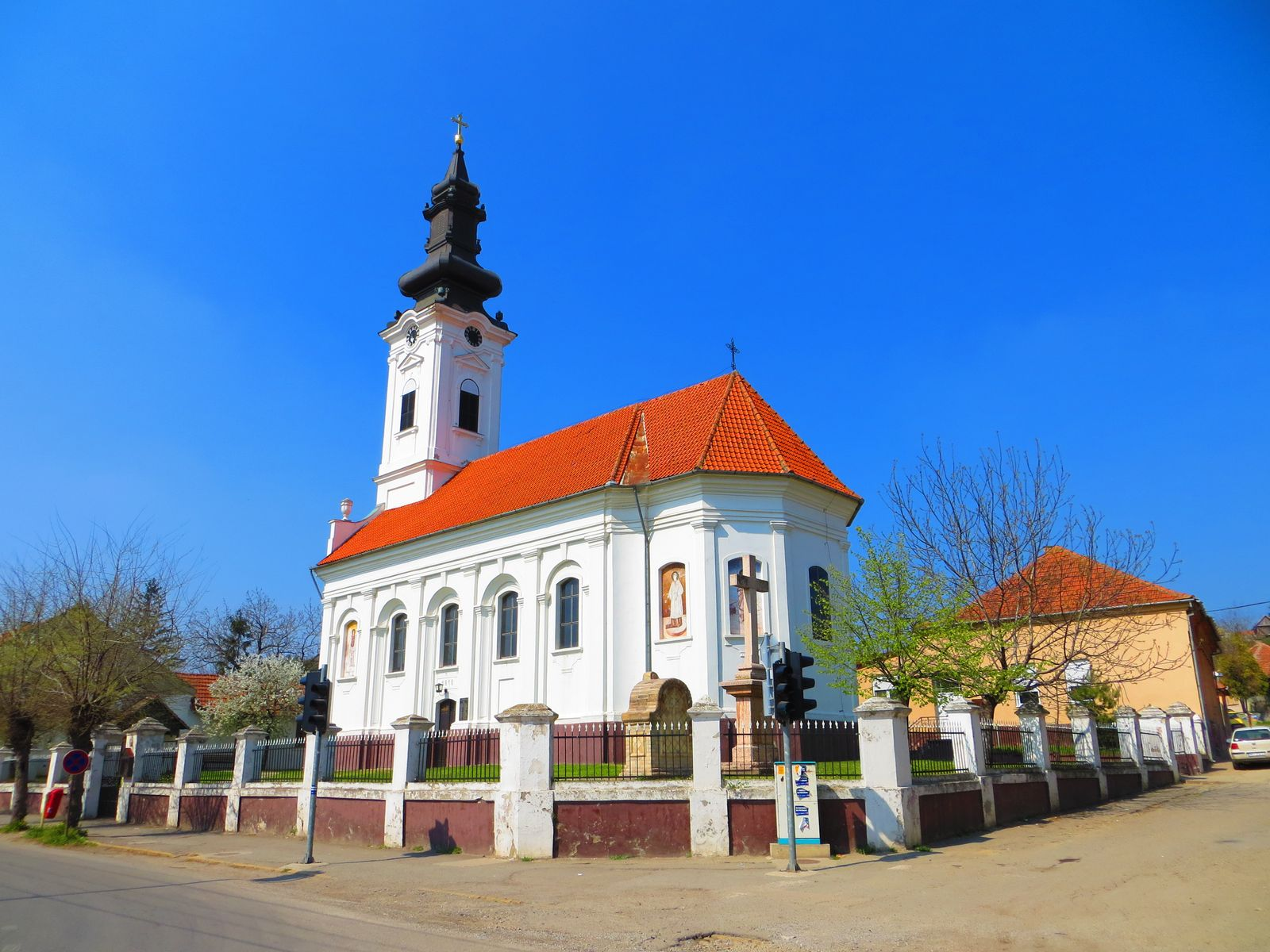
- Church of the Dormition of the Theotokos
- Church of the Dormition of the Theotokos
- 45°12′17″N 20°18′21″E
- Location: Titel, Vojvodina
- Country: Serbia
- Denomination: Serbian Orthodox

History
- Status: Church
- Dedication: Dormition of the Theotokos

Architecture
- Functional status: Active
- Style: Neo-classicism
- Years built: 1810

Administration
- Archdiocese: Eparchy of Bačka

The Church of the Dormition of the Theotokos (Serbian: Црква Успења Пресвете Богородице) in Titel is Serbian Orthodox church in Vojvodina, Serbia. The church was constructed in 1810. The iconostasis with icons, frescoes and the archbishop's throne were created by the academic painter August Tirk in 1866. Previously used iconostasis was at that time moved to the orthodox church in the nearby village of Lok. Interestingly, while interior decoration of the Serbian Orthodox church in Titel was completed by Roman Catholic artist Tirk, interior decoration of the local Roman Catholic church was completed by Serbian Orthodox artist Arsenije Teodorović.

== See also ==
- Eparchy of Bačka
