= Šajkaška =

Historical subregion of Bačka, Serbia

Šajkaška Шајкашка
- Historical region of Serbia
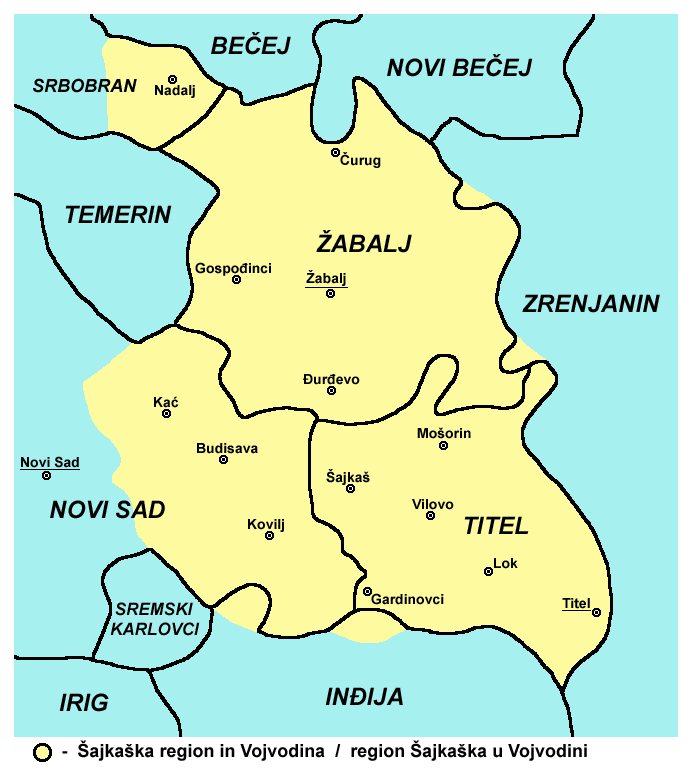
- Country: Serbia
- Largest city: Žabalj; Titel

Population
  - Total: 43,562 (2,022)

Šajkaška (Serbian Cyrillic: Шајкашка) is a historical region in southeastern Bačka, Serbia. It is divided among four municipalities: Titel, Žabalj, Novi Sad, and Srbobran.

== Etymology ==
The name Šajkaška means "the land of Šajkaši". Šajkaši were a specific river marine infantry of the Habsburg army, which moved in narrow, long boats, known as "šajka". These military units had operated on the Danube, Tisa, Sava and Moriš rivers. In Hungarian, the region is known as Sajkásvidék and in German as Schajkaschka.

== History ==
After 1400, the majority of the people in Šajkaška were Serbs who had settled the area before or after the Ottomans conquered the Balkan lands to the south. Moving further north, they had become established at Csepel Island, where they founded Srpski Kovin (Ráckeve). After 1526 and the Battle of Mohacs, they moved to the northern Danube and to the city of Komarno which, for a long time, was the administrative headquarters of the Šajkaš forces.

After the Treaty of Karlowitz in 1699, the region was part of the Habsburg monarchy. Most of Šajkaška was included into the Habsburg Military Frontier (its Danube and Tisa sections), while one part of the region was included into the Bodrog County. When these parts of the Military Frontier were abolished (in 1750), Šajkaška was included into the Theiss District, which was part of the Batsch-Bodrog County within the Habsburg Kingdom of Hungary. In 1763, Šajkaška was excluded from the Theiss District and was again placed under military administration. The Šajkaš Battalion, as part of the Military Frontier, was founded in this area. In the beginning of the Habsburg administration, the population of the region was composed entirely of Serbs, which were brave and skillful warriors. Serb Šajkaši have participated in many battles against the Ottoman Empire.

By 1739 and the Peace of Belgrade, the border between Austria and Turkey was moved to the Sava and Danube rivers, and at that time, the idea was proposed to move the Šajkaši down from the north. That was done from 1763 to 1764.

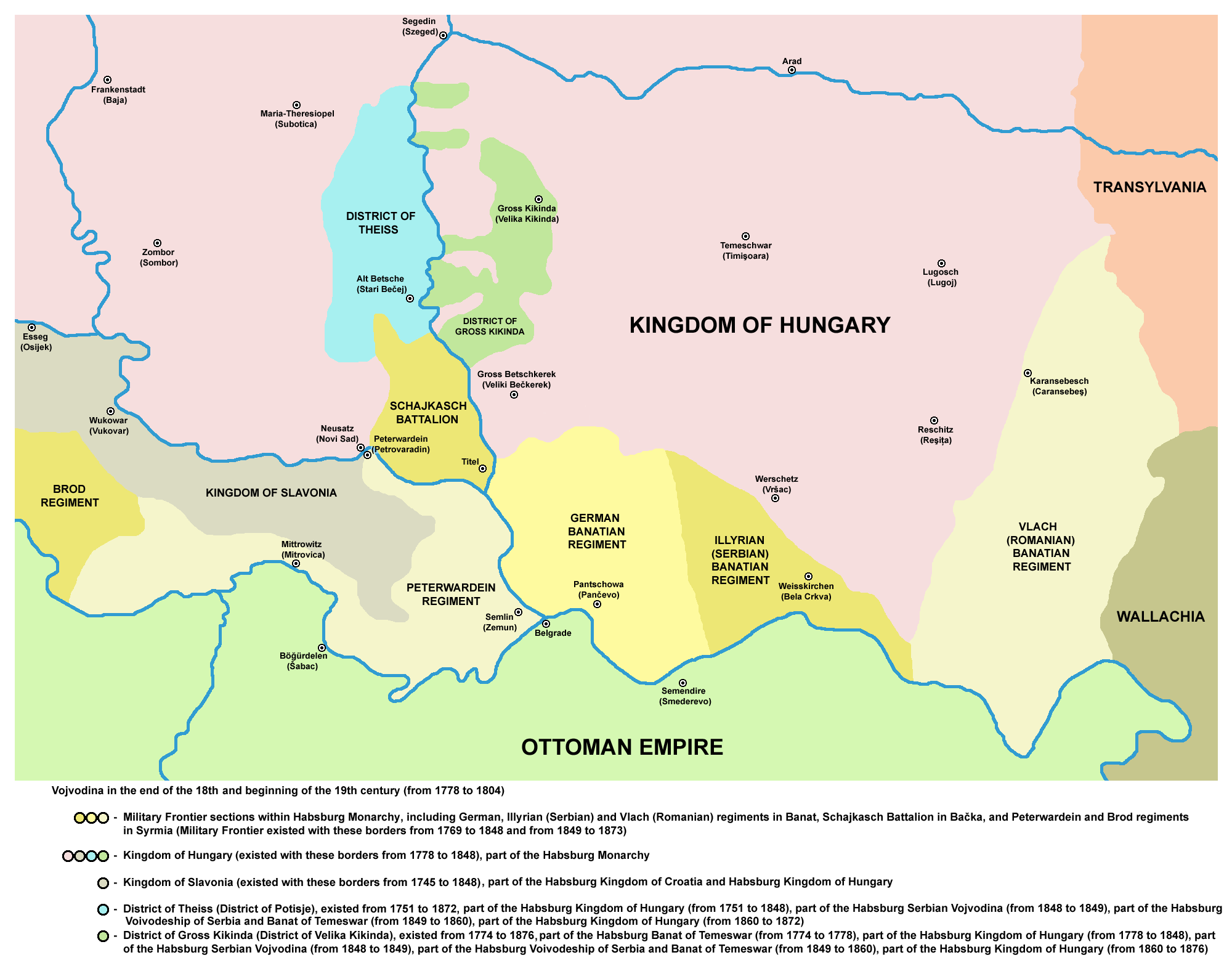
Location of the Šajkaš Battalion, 18th-19th century

From 1848 to 1849, the region was part of the autonomous Serbian Vojvodina, but was again included into the Military Frontier in 1849. In 1852, the Šajkaš battalion was transformed into the Titel infantry battalion. This military unit was abolished in 1873, and the region was again incorporated into the Bács-Bodrog County. Administratively, the territory of Šajkaška was organized into the municipality of Titel and the separate municipality of Žabalj was also later established. In 1910, ethnic Serbs formed the absolute majority in both municipalities. Besides Serbs who formed the majority in most settlements, the region was also populated by Hungarians who formed the majority in the village of Budisava and a sizable minority in a few other settlements, Germans who formed a sizable minority in several settlements and Rusyns who formed a sizable minority in Đurđevo.

In 1918, as part of the Banat, Bačka and Baranja region, Šajkaška became part of the Kingdom of Serbia and then part of the newly formed Kingdom of Serbs, Croats and Slovenes (later renamed to Yugoslavia). From 1918 to 1922 Šajkaška was part of the Novi Sad County, from 1922 to 1929 part of the Belgrade Oblast, and from 1929 to 1941 part of the Danube Banovina. From 1941 to 1944, the region was occupied by the Axis Powers, and was attached to the Bács-Bodrog County of Horthy's Hungary. In the 1942 raid, the Hungarian occupational authorities killed numerous ethnic Serbs, Jews and Romani in Šajkaška. In 1944, the Soviet Red Army and Yugoslav Partisans expelled the Axis forces from the region, and Šajkaška became part of the Autonomous Province of Vojvodina within the Socialist Republic of Serbia in socialist Yugoslavia.

== Settlements ==
The Titel municipality:

- Titel
- Vilovo
- Gardinovci
- Lok
- Mošorin
- Šajkaš

The Žabalj municipality:

- Žabalj
- Gospođinci
- Đurđevo
- Čurug

The City of Novi Sad:

- Kovilj
- Kać
- Budisava

The Srbobran municipality:

- Nadalj

== Culture ==
There is a Serbian Orthodox Kovilj Monastery near the village of Kovilj. According to a legend, the monastery was founded by Saint Sava in the 13th century.

== Gallery ==
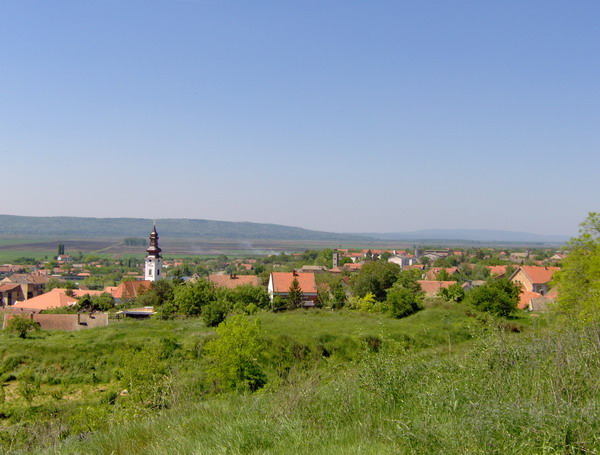
Titel

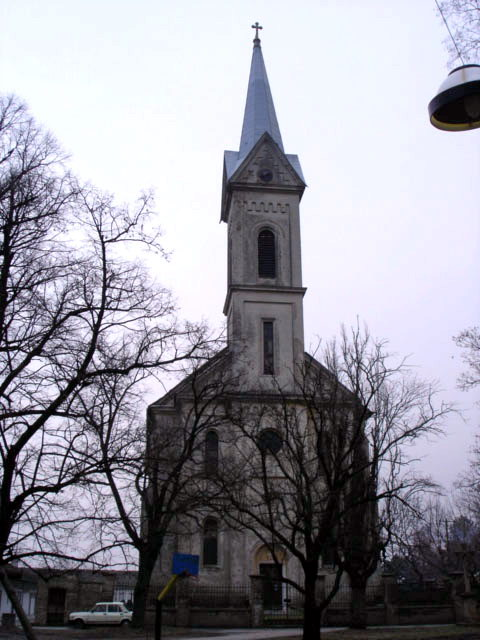
Žabalj

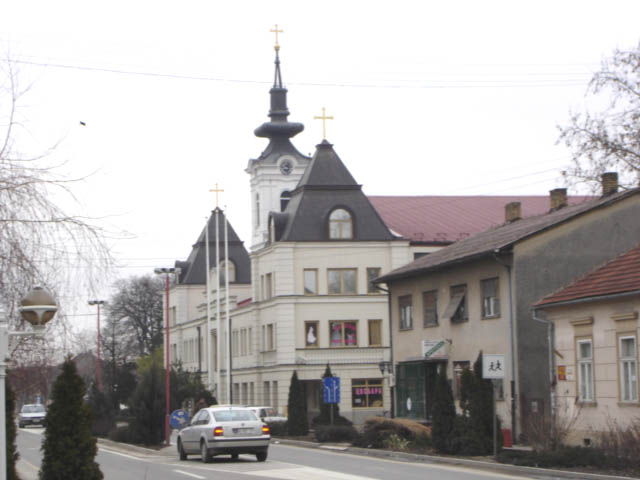
Kać
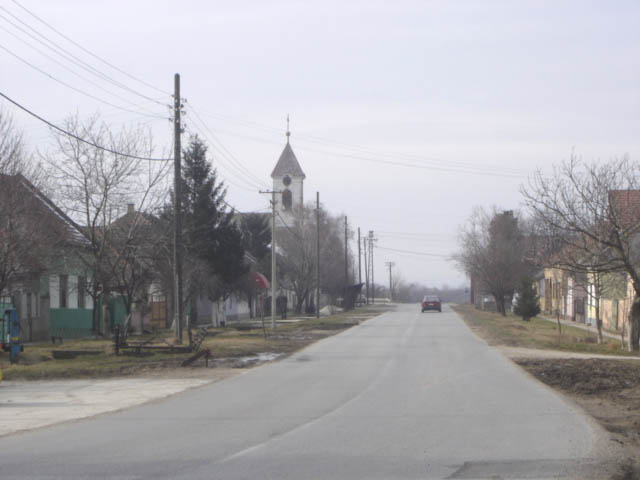
Vilovo

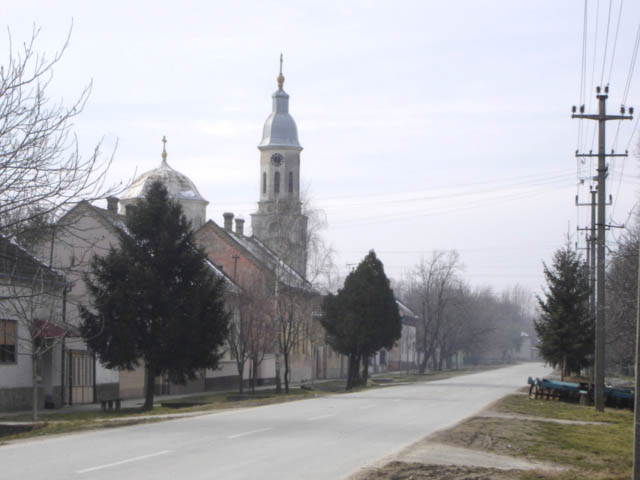
Gardinovci

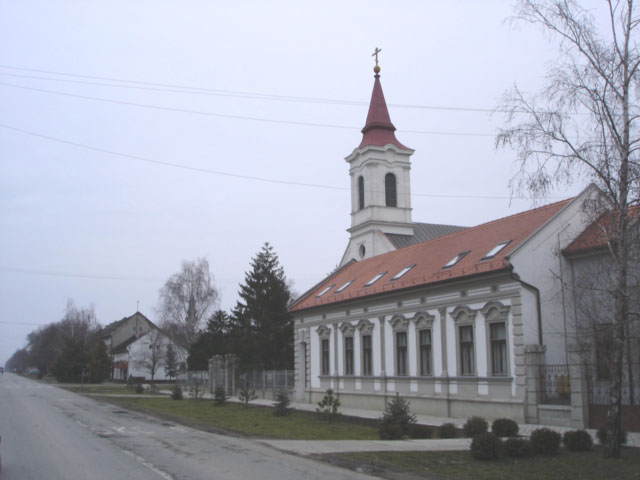
Đurđevo

== See also ==
- List of regions of Serbia
