= Avram Miletić =

18th and 19th century Serbian songwriter

- Аврам Милетић
- Born: 1755; Kać, Military Frontier, Habsburg monarchy (today Serbia)
- Died: after 1826
- Occupation: merchant
- Known for: writing the earliest collection of urban lyric poetry in Serbian

Avram Miletić (Serbian: Аврам Милетић) (1755 – after 1826) was a merchant and writer of epic folk songs who is best known for writing the earliest collection of urban lyric poetry in Serbian between 1778 and 1781.

== Family ==
Miletić was born in Kać, Military Frontier, Habsburg monarchy. Miletić's grandfather was Mileta Zavišić who came to Bačka from Kostajnica where he led a company of three hundred men and fought against Ottomans for thirty two years. Since Ottomans wanted to punish him after they signed a peace treaty with Austrians, Mileta emigrated to Bačka and changed his last name to Miletić. Mileta's son Sima, who was a merchant educated in Novi Sad, had fifteen sons and three daughters. Avram Miletić was the oldest Sima's son. The second son of Avram Miletić, also Sima like his grandfather, was a boot-maker and a father of Svetozar Miletić, the political leader of the Serbs in Vojvodina.

== Biography ==
Avram Miletić completed his education in economics, first in Vidin and later in Novi Sad. In period 1785—1787 Avram Miletić has been a teacher in two schools in two different villages, Lok and Vilovo, at the same time (he lectured in one school in the morning and another in the afternoon). He married a local priest's daughter and opened a general store in Mošorin.

== Work ==
In period 1778—1781 Avram Miletić composed a miscellany of 129 songs (Serbian: Песмарица, Pesmarica). It contains many Serbian lyric poems and four folk epic poems: "A history of Prince Lazar from Kosovo and from Tzar Murat", "A history of Musić Stefan", "A history of the Duke Momčilo" and "A history of the Young Prodanović", which have been noted down around thirty years before Vuk Karadžić started recording epic poems. Miletić named all folk epic songs he recorded as histories because they have been considered as histories in the form of poems. Epic song "History of the Young Prodanović" is in fact well known song "Serbs in Donauwörth" (Serbian: Срби у Донаверту, Srbi u Donavertu) recorded in 1744 by Hristofor Zhefarovich.

Miletić's miscellany is considered as the oldest known songbook of urban poetry. Miletić has recorded a famous ballad "Omer and Merima" only five or six years after Alberto Fortis recorded it for the first time. He has also recorded a text of the poem Pašhalija composed by Jovan Avakumović in 1775.
