= Vesna Knežević =

Serbian politician

Vesna Knežević (Serbian Cyrillic: Весна Кнежевић; born 13 October 1958) is a politician in Serbia. She has served in the National Assembly of Serbia since 2020 as a member of the Serbian Progressive Party.

== Early life and career ==
Knežević was born in Titel in the Autonomous Province of Vojvodina, in what was then the People's Republic of Serbia in the Federal People's Republic of Yugoslavia. She is a lawyer in private life.

== Politician ==
=== Municipal politics ===
Knežević received the ninth position on the Progressive Party's electoral list for the Titel municipal assembly in the 2012 Serbian local elections and was elected when the list won eleven out of twenty-five mandates. She was re-elected in the municipal elections of 2016 and 2020 local elections, in which the Progressives won successive majority victories.

Knežević was chosen as president (i.e., speaker) of the municipal assembly after the 2016 election and served in this role until 2020.

=== Parliamentarian ===
Knežević received the 166th position on the Progressive Party's Aleksandar Vučić — For Our Children list in the 2020 parliamentary election and was elected when the list won a landslide victory with 188 out of 250 mandates. She is a member of the assembly committee on labour, social issues, social inclusion and poverty reduction; a deputy member of the committee on human and minority rights and gender equality and the agriculture, forestry, and water management committee; and a member of the parliamentary friendship groups with Austria, Greece, Israel, and Russia.
