= Krčedin =

Krčedin Крчедин (Serbian)
- Village (Selo)
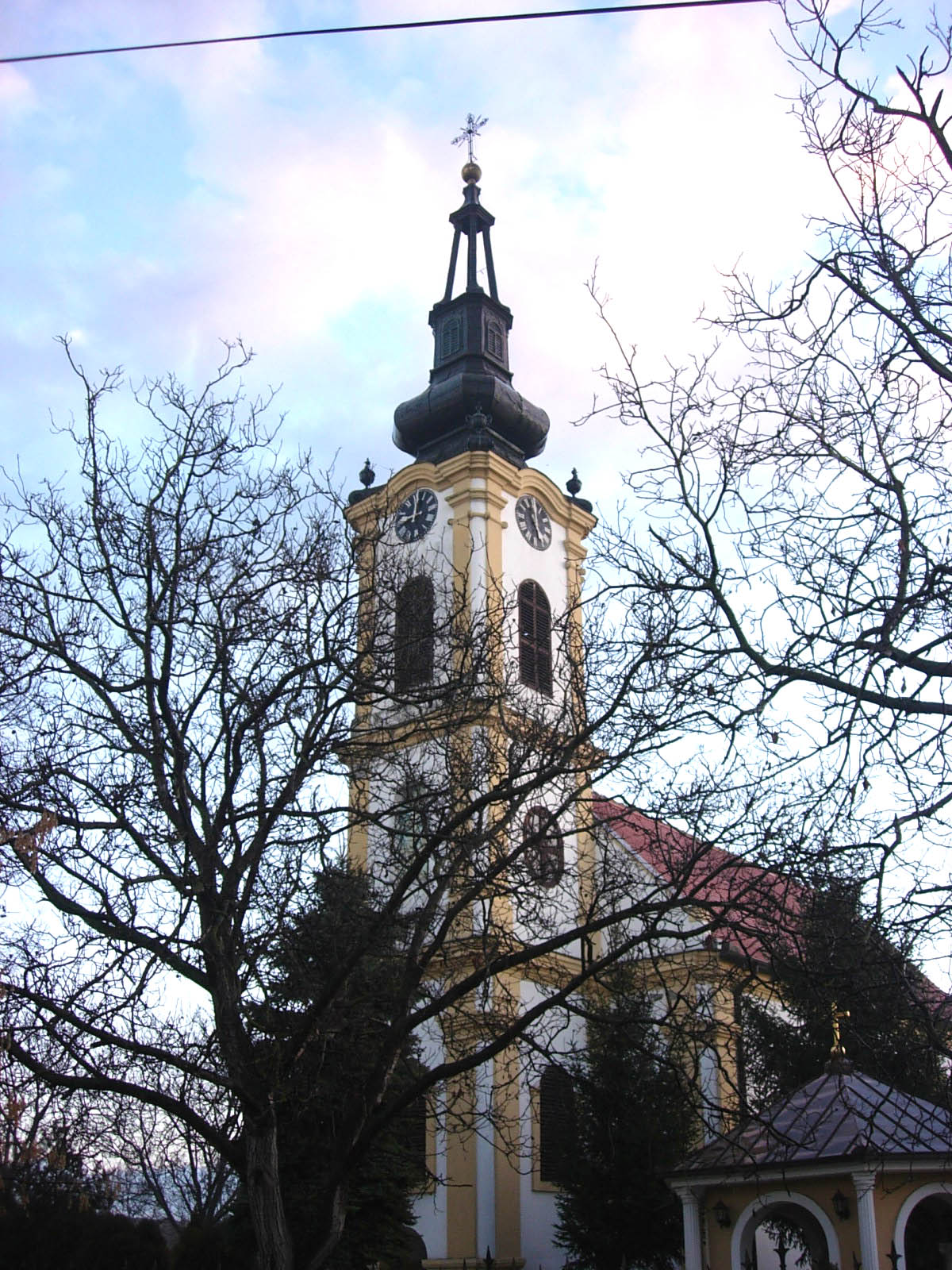
- The Orthodox church

- Location within Vojvodina Location within Serbia Location within Europe
- Coordinates: 45°8′N 20°8′E
- Country: Serbia
- Province: Vojvodina
- District: Srem
- Municipality: Inđija

Population (2002)
  - Total: 2,878
- Time zone: UTC+1 (CET)
  - Summer (DST): UTC+2 (CEST)

Krčedin (Serbian Cyrillic: Крчедин) is a village in Serbia. It is situated in the Inđija municipality, in the Srem District, Vojvodina province. The village has a Serb ethnic majority and its population numbering 2,878 people (2002 census). Great fishing and hunting place. It has the biggest natural island on all Danube river, Krčedinska Ada.

== Demography ==
The majority of the population are ethnic Serbs, but there is also a sizable Roma minority, which lives in the Salajka part of the village.

=== Population Figures ===
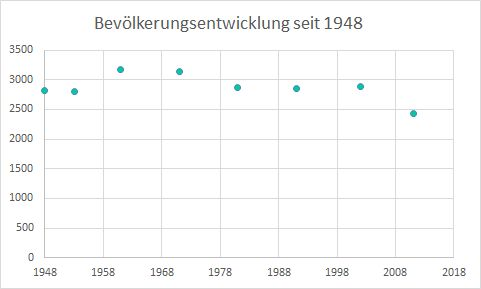

- 1948: 2810
- 1953: 2799
- 1961: 3167
- 1971: 3134
- 1981: 2877
- 1991: 2852
- 2002: 2878
- 2011: 2429

== See also ==
- List of places in Serbia
- List of cities, towns and villages in Vojvodina
