= Jovan Avakumović (poet) =

Serbian poet, nobleman and lawyer

- Јован Авакумовић
- Born: 1748; Szentendre
- Died: 1810 (aged 61–62)
- Other name: Pašalija
- Citizenship: Hungarian
- Education: Bratislava, Trnava, Wien, Leipzig
- Occupations: Lawyer, Poet
- Relatives: Nikola Avakumović

Jovan Avakumović (Serbian Cyrillic: Јован Авакумовић, c. 1748 – 1810), also known by his nickname Pašalija, was a Serbian poet, nobleman and lawyer.

== Life ==
Jovan was born in 1748 into the prominent family of Nikola Avakumović, a merchant of Szentendre and judge whom Emperor Leopold II named a nobleman in charters. He was schooled in Bratislava, Trnava, Wien and Leipzig. He was a lawyer of the Temišvar Eparchy. As a poet he was famed in his time and known as a representative of the Serbian folk poetry of the 18th century, even if he only wrote a few poems which were part of handwritten poem books. In 1775 he composed song Pašalija (Serbian: Пашалија новаја), later also recorded by Avram Miletić. Avakumović died in 1810.

As a poet Avakumović came to hold definite theories of purposes and values of poetics and orthography, which he set forth in poems collected after his death in Pesme Jovana Avakumovića (Poems of Jovan Avakumović). Besides Dositej Obradović, he was among the first to produce works in verse in Serbian vernacular, anticipating the 19th century language reforms of Vuk Karadžić.

== Sources ==
- Rastko Istorija Srba
