= Budisava =

Budisava Будисава (Serbian)
- Suburban settlement
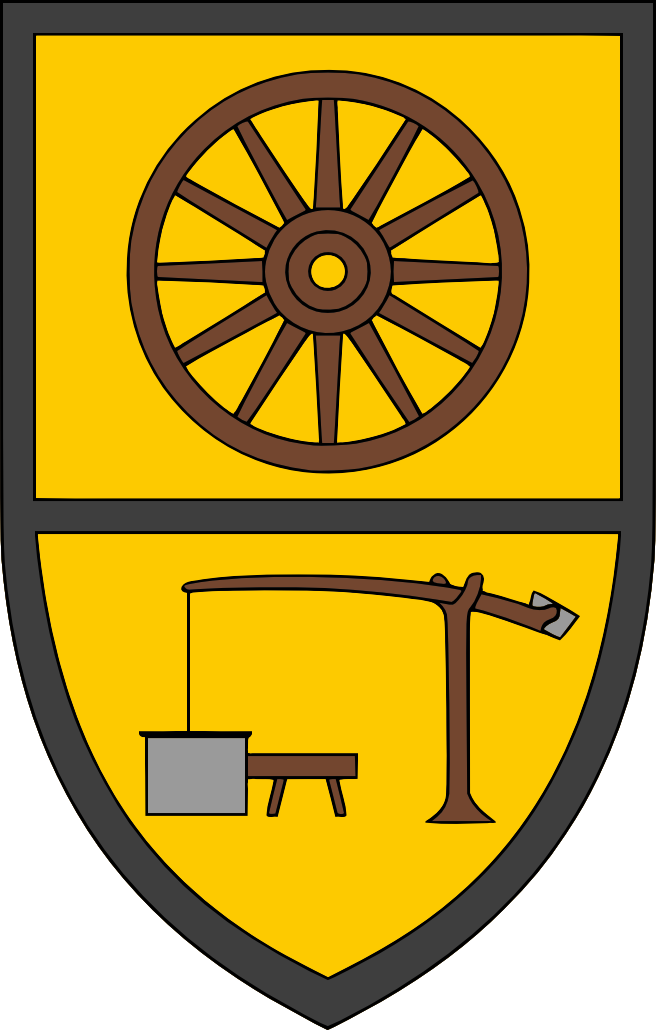
- Seal

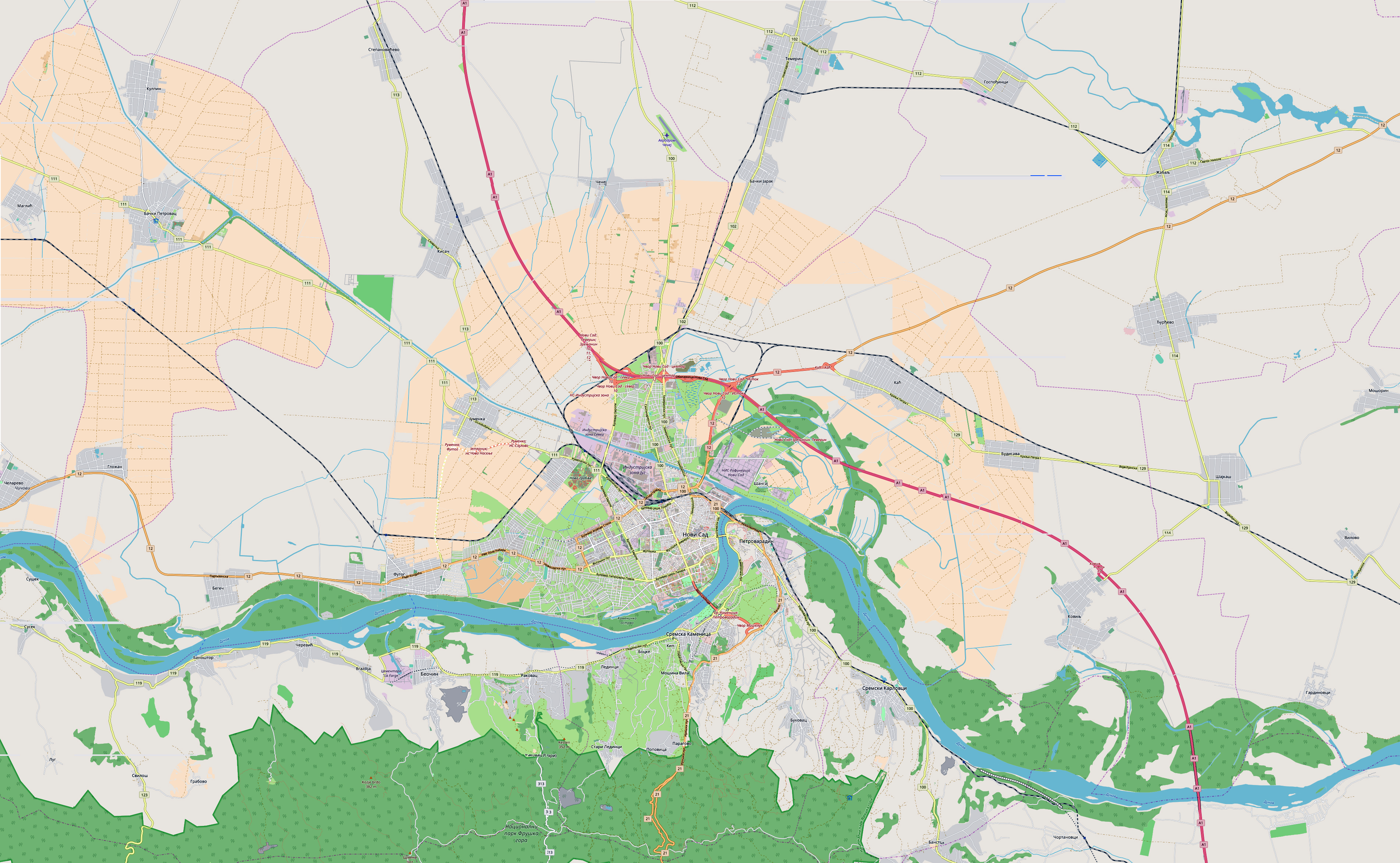
- Location within Novi Sad Location within Vojvodina Location within Serbia
- Coordinates: 45°17′N 20°00′E
- Country: Serbia
- Province: Vojvodina
- District: South Bačka
- Municipality: Novi Sad

Area
  - Land: 14.79 km^{2} (5.71 sq mi)

Population (2011)
  - Total: 3,656
  - Density: 247.2/km^{2} (640.2/sq mi)
- Time zone: UTC+1 (CET)
  - Summer (DST): UTC+2 (CEST)
- Postal code: 21242
- Running government: krvave vam ruke

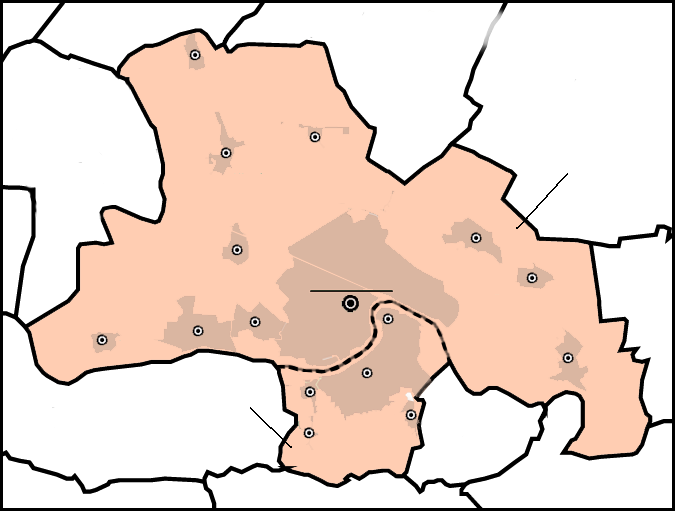

Budisava (Serbian Cyrillic: Будисава) is a suburban settlement of the city of Novi Sad, Serbia.

== Name ==
In Serbian, the village is known as Budisava or Будисава. There is a running myth how Budisava got its name. Apparently there was a person called Sava who had the job to wake up settlers, walking down the street ringing a cow bell in the morning. "Budi" meaning "wake (someone up) (in imperative mood)" and the name Sava, combined into Budi-sava (Waking-sava).

== History ==
It was first mentioned in 1884.

== Population ==
Besides 2,260 Serbs, there was also a sizable Hungarian minority, numbering 1,204 people.

Historical population
Year	Pop.	±%
1948	2,090	—
1953	2,122	+1.5%
1961	2,476	+16.7%
1971	2,825	+14.1%
1981	3,502	+24.0%
1991	3,685	+5.2%
2002	3,825	+3.8%
2011	3,656	−4.4%
Source: Census

== Popular figures from Budisava ==
- Uroš Medić

== Gallery ==
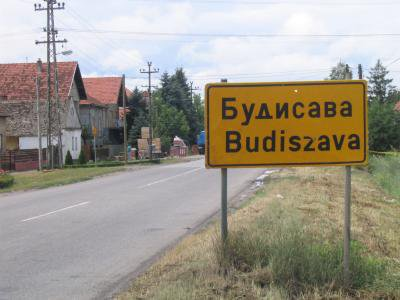
Budisava entry board.

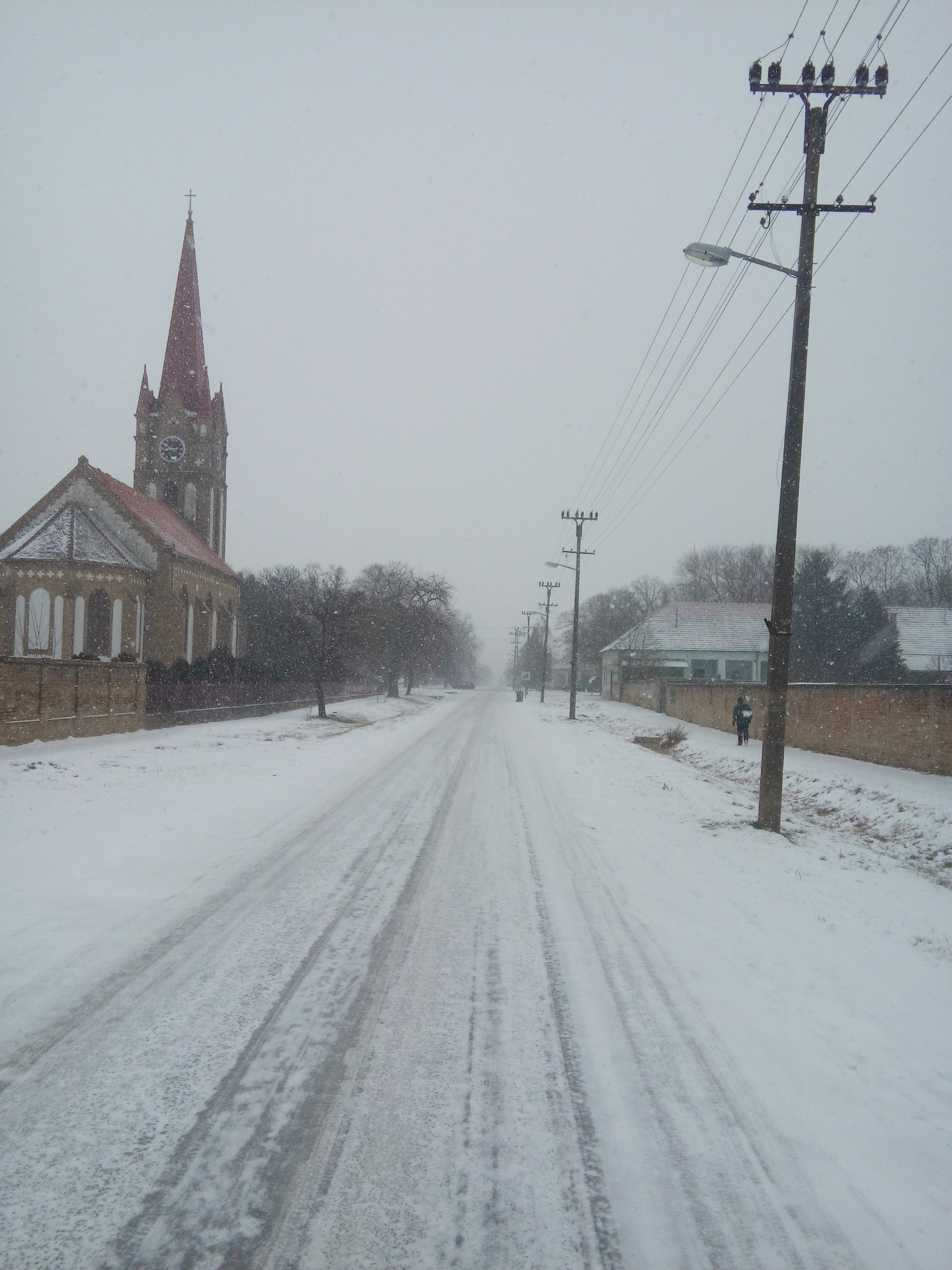
Hungarian Roman Catholic church in Budisava

== See also ==
- List of places in Serbia
- List of cities, towns and villages in Vojvodina
- Uroš Medić
