= Gardinovci =

Gardinovci Гардиновци (Serbian)
- Village (Selo)
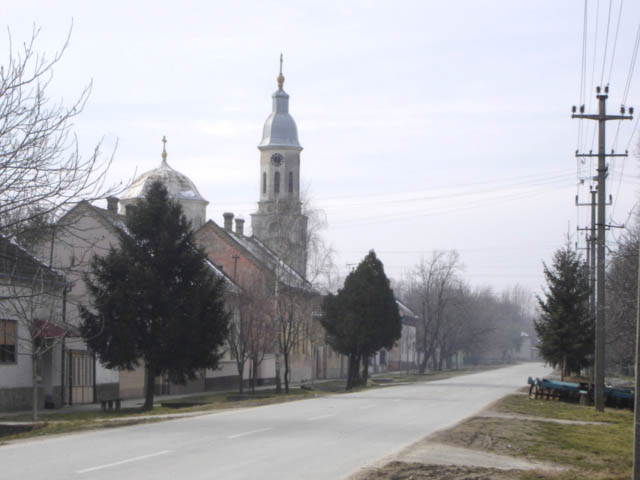
- Main street and the Orthodox Church

- Location within Vojvodina Location within Serbia Location within Europe
- Coordinates: 45°12′N 20°08′E
- Country: Serbia
- Province: Vojvodina
- District: South Bačka District
- Municipality: Titel

Area
  - Total: 31.7 km^{2} (12.2 sq mi)
- Elevation: 78 m (256 ft)

Population (2011)
  - Total: 1,297
  - Density: 40.9/km^{2} (106/sq mi)
- Time zone: UTC+1 (CET)
  - Summer (DST): UTC+2 (CEST)

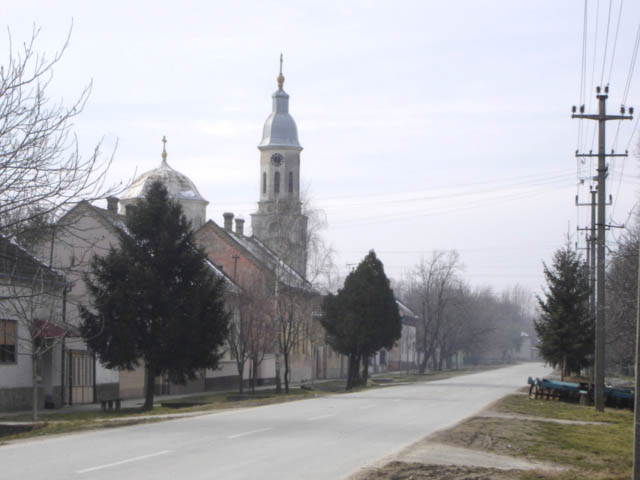
Main street and the Orthodox Church

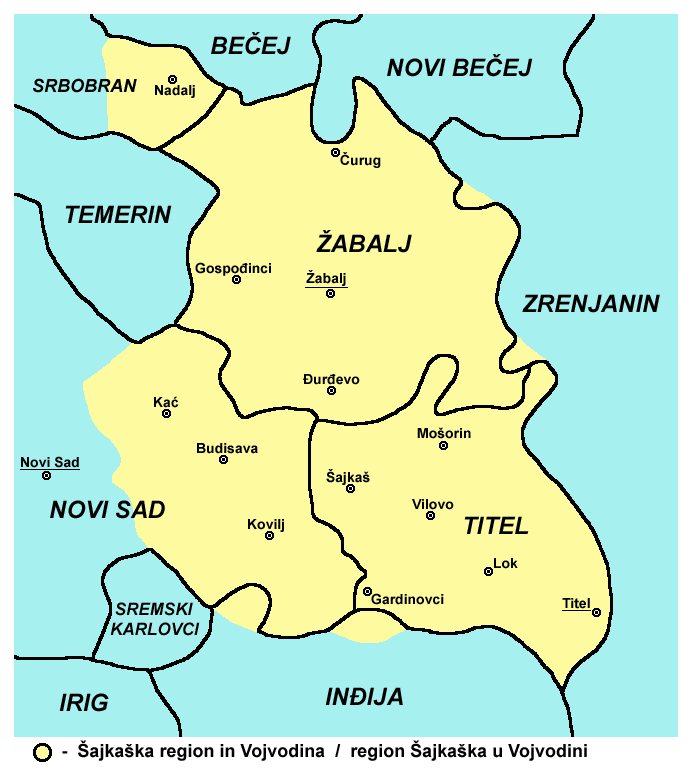
Map of the Titel municipality and Šajkaška region, showing the location of Gardinovci

Gardinovci (Serbian Cyrillic: Гардиновци; Hungarian: Dunagárdony) is a village located in the Titel municipality, South Bačka District, Vojvodina, Serbia. The village has a Serb ethnic majority and its population numbering 1,297 people (as of the 2011 census).

== Name ==
In Serbo-Croatian, the village is known as Gardinovci or Гардиновци, and in Hungarian as Dunagárdony. The name of the village in Serbo-Croatian is plural.

== Demographics ==
Historical population
Year	Pop.	±% p.a.
1961	1,712	—
1971	1,636	−0.45%
1981	1,515	−0.77%
1991	1,452	−0.42%
2002	1,484	+0.20%
2011	1,297	−1.49%

As of the 2011 census, the village of Gardinovci has a population of 1,297 inhabitants.

== See also ==
- List of places in Serbia
- List of cities, towns and villages in Vojvodina
