= Šajkaš =

Šajkaš Шајкаш (Serbian)
- Village (Selo)
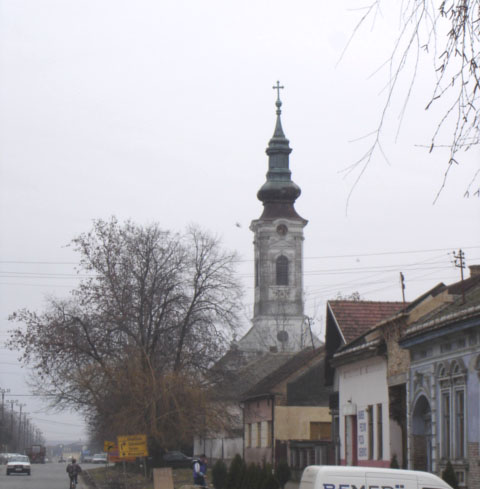
- Main street and the Orthodox Church

- Location within Vojvodina Location within Serbia Location within Europe
- Coordinates: 45°16′N 20°05′E
- Country: Serbia
- Province: Vojvodina
- District: South Bačka District
- Municipality: Titel

Area
  - Total: 38.9 km^{2} (15.0 sq mi)
- Elevation: 78 m (256 ft)

Population (2022)
  - Total: 4,004
  - Density: 103/km^{2} (267/sq mi)
- Time zone: UTC+1 (CET)
  - Summer (DST): UTC+2 (CEST)

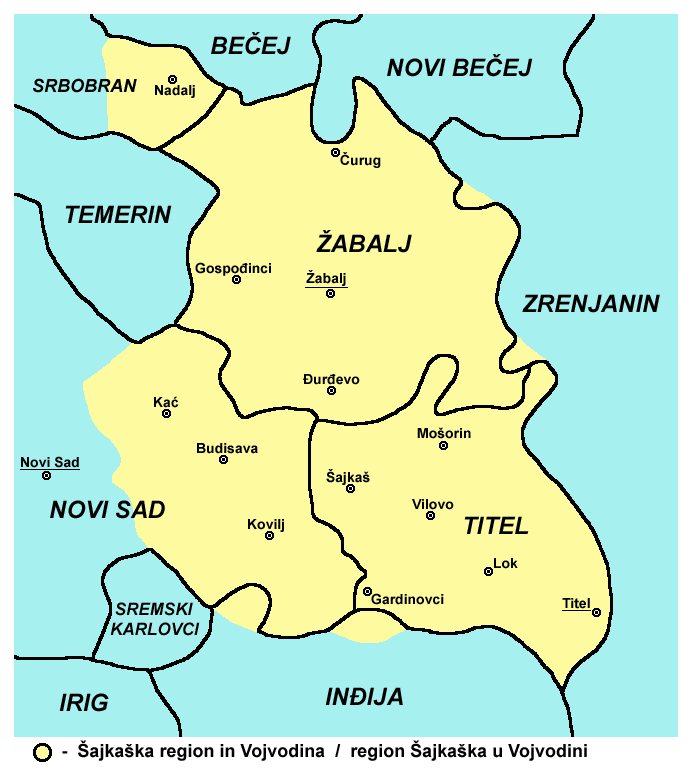
Map of the Titel municipality and Šajkaška region, showing the location of Šajkaš

Šajkaš (Serbian Cyrillic: Шајкаш; Hungarian: Sajkásszentiván) is a village located in the Titel municipality, South Bačka District, Vojvodina, Serbia. As of the 2022 census, it has a population of 4,004 inhabitants.

== Name ==
In Serbo-Croatian the village is known as Šajkaš (Шајкаш), in Hungarian as Sajkásszentiván, and in German as Schatzdorf or Schajkasch-Sentiwan.

== History ==
The Šajkaška district was the scene of a notorious massacre during the occupation of Bačka by the Hungarian army in January 1942, which cost almost 900 lives. The German minority left the village in 1944.

== Demographics ==
Historical population
Year	Pop.	±% p.a.
1961	2,825	—
1971	2,987	+0.56%
1981	3,541	+1.72%
1991	3,828	+0.78%
2002	4,848	+2.17%
2011	4,374	−1.14%

As of the 2011 census, the village of Šajkaš has a population of 4,374 inhabitants.

== See also ==
- List of places in Serbia
- List of cities, towns and villages in Vojvodina
