= Vilovo (Titel) =

Vilovo Вилово (Serbian) Tündéres (Hungarian)
- Village (Selo)
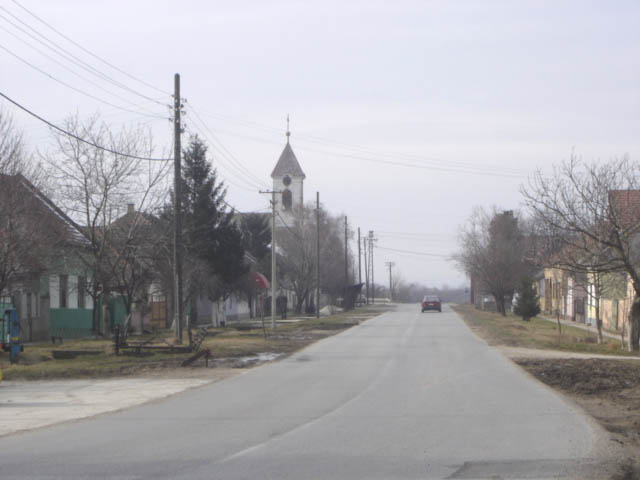
- Main street and the Orthodox Church

- Location within Vojvodina Location within Serbia Location within Europe
- Coordinates: 45°15′N 20°09′E
- Country: Serbia
- Province: Vojvodina
- District: South Bačka District
- Municipality: Titel

Area
  - Total: 26.2 km^{2} (10.1 sq mi)
- Elevation: 116 m (381 ft)

Population (2022)
  - Total: 975
  - Density: 37.2/km^{2} (96.4/sq mi)
- Time zone: UTC+1 (CET)
  - Summer (DST): UTC+2 (CEST)

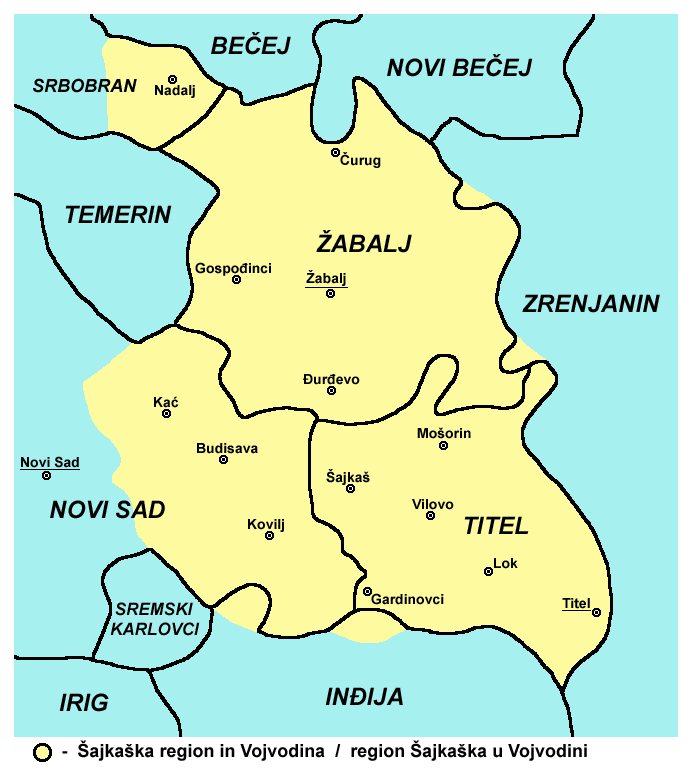
Map of the Titel municipality and Šajkaška region, showing the location of Vilovo

Vilovo (Serbian Cyrillic: Вилово; Hungarian: Tündéres) is a village located in the Titel municipality, South Bačka District, Vojvodina, Serbia. As of the 2022 census, it has a population of 975 inhabitants. In the 1990s, after the collapse of Yugoslavia, the town saw a large influx of Bosnian immigrants, which led to the nickname Panićovo, due to the high number of residents with the surname Panić.

== Demographics ==
Historical population
Year	Pop.	±% p.a.
1961	1,154	—
1971	1,169	+0.13%
1981	1,089	−0.71%
1991	1,077	−0.11%
2002	1,103	+0.22%
2011	1,090	−0.13%

As of the 2022 census, the village of Vilovo has a population of 975 inhabitants.

== See also ==
- List of places in Serbia
- List of cities, towns and villages in Vojvodina
