= Titel =

Titel Тител (Serbian) Titel (Hungarian)
- Town and municipality
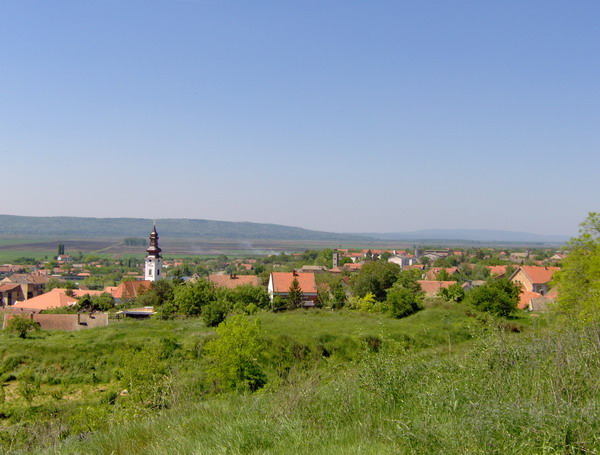
- Panorama view of Titel, seen from Titel Hill

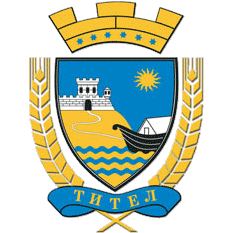
- Coat of arms

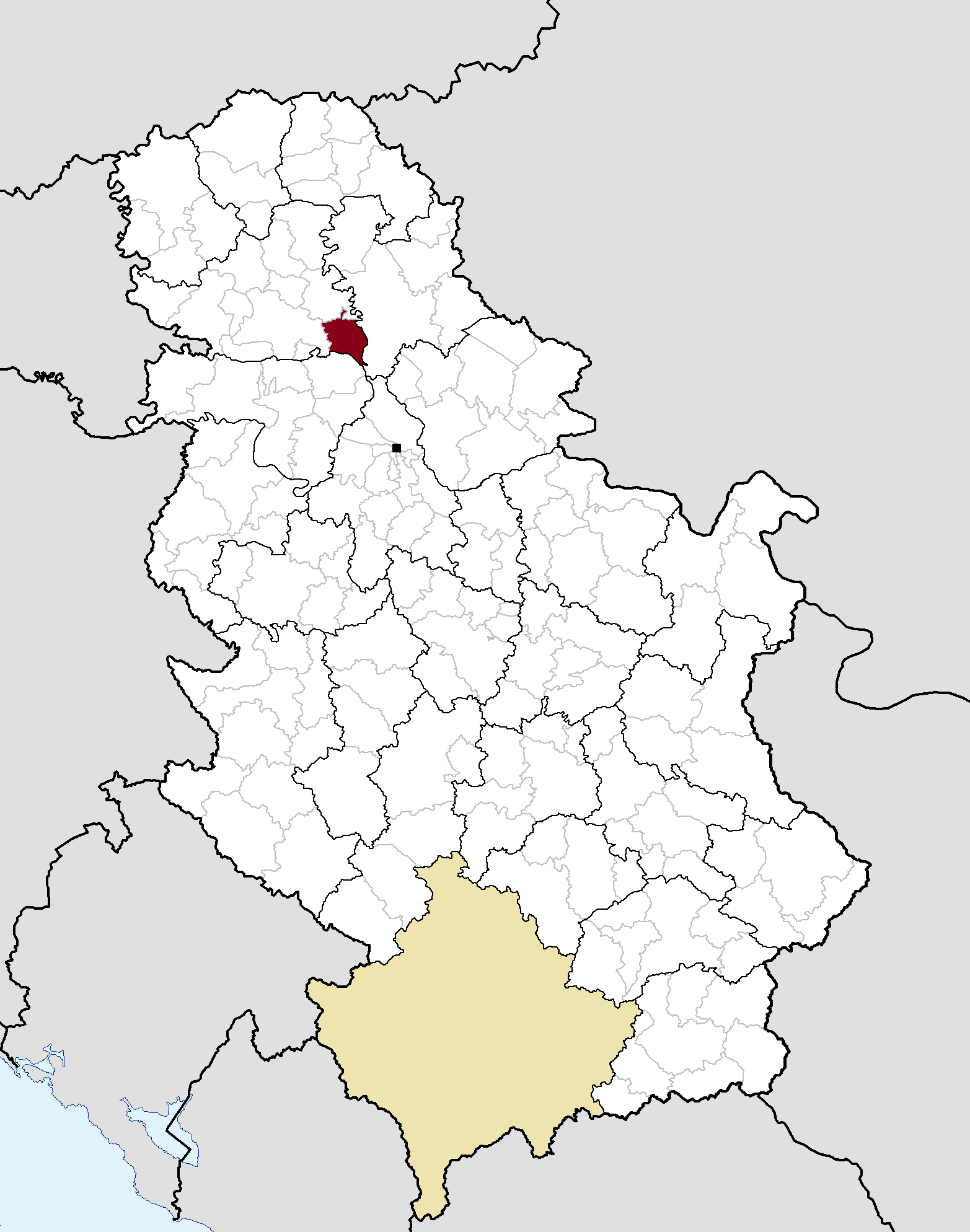
- Location of the municipality of Titel within Serbia

- Location within Vojvodina Location within Serbia Location within Europe
- Coordinates: 45°12′17″N 20°18′0″E
- Country: Serbia
- Province: Vojvodina
- District: South Bačka
- Settlements: 6

Government
  - Mayor: Dragan Božić (SNS)

Area
  - Town: 66.91 km^{2} (25.83 sq mi)
  - Municipality: 260.75 km^{2} (100.68 sq mi)
- Elevation: 79 m (259 ft)

Population (2022 census)
  - Town: 4,522
  - Town density: 67.58/km^{2} (175.0/sq mi)
  - Municipality: 13,984
  - Municipality density: 53.630/km^{2} (138.90/sq mi)
- Time zone: UTC+1 (CET)
  - Summer (DST): UTC+2 (CEST)
- Postal code: 21240
- Area code: +381 21
- Car plates: NS
- Official languages: Serbian together with Hungarian
- Website: www.opstina-titel.org.rs

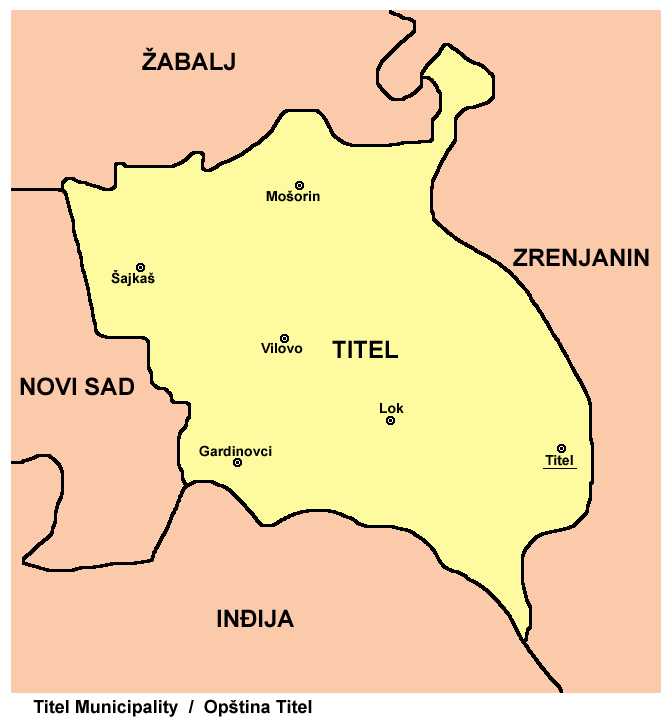
Map of Titel municipality

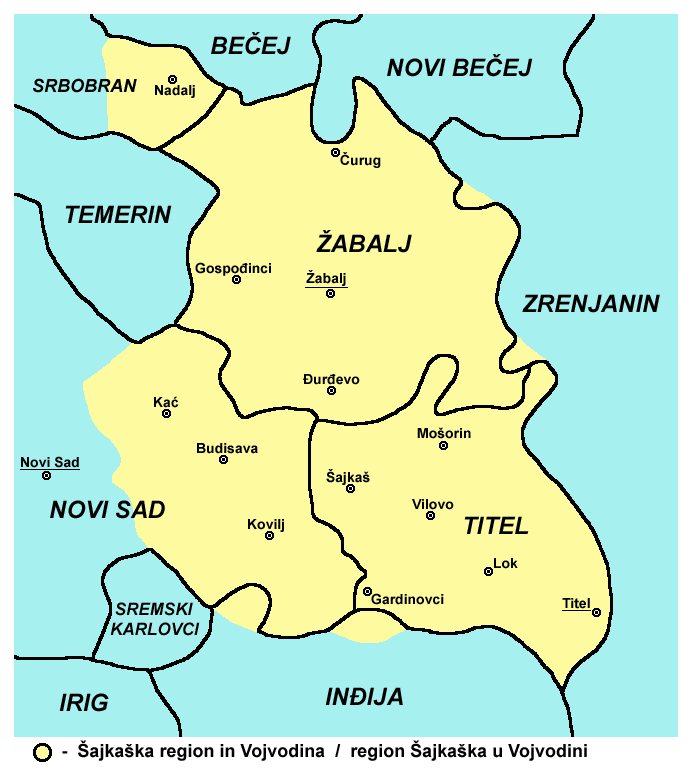
map of the Titel municipality and Šajkaška region

Titel (Serbian Cyrillic: Тител, Hungarian: Titel) is a town and municipality located in the South Bačka District of the province of Vojvodina, Serbia. The town of Titel has a population of 4,522, while the population of the municipality of Titel is 13,984 (2022 census). It is located in southeastern part of the geographical region of Bačka, known as Šajkaška. The town is known for the Tisza river flowing into the Danube here.

== Name ==
In Serbian, the town is known as Titel (Тител), in Hungarian as Titel, in German as Titel (and sometimes Theisshügel), and in Latin as Titulium.

== History ==
The Titel Plateau is an elevated region between the Danube and Tisza rivers, close to the confluence; about 16 by 7 kilometres (9.9 by 4.3 miles); roughly 80 square kilometres (31 square miles). It has an ellipsoid form and is characterized by steep slopes at the margins. It has a substantial loess cover and is often called the Titel Loess Plateau; the loess on the plateau is considered to contain the most detailed terrestrial palaeoclimate records in Europe, with a thick and apparently continuous record extending to the middle and late Early Pleistocene. It represents a major archaeological site at the Danube-Tisza confluence with prehistoric and ancient findings.

Early medieval sources are scarce. Slavs are mentioned in the area in the late seventh and early eighth century, while Magyars (Hungarians) settled the Pannonian Plain in 896, already in the next century holding the Tisa-Danube confluence. Grand Prince Árpád (r. 895–907) is believed to have defeated the Bulgars (Salan) at Titel. Titel was an important strategical location, and was included in the Bács County. Ladislaus I of Hungary (r. 1077–95) and his brother Lampert founded an Augustinian monastery here. On 17 October 1389 a Clement was inscribed at the Vienna University, who in Titel taught reading and cantillation.

In the 1400s, Titel belonged to the Serbian despot Đurađ Branković. In 1439 Albert II's army awaited in Titel military aid from the county to help Đurađ Branković defend Smederevo, but the aid never arrived.

From 1526, the town was part of the Ottoman Empire. According to the first Ottoman census from 1546, the town had 87 houses, of which most were Serb, three were Croat, one Hungarian, and one Vlach. The duke of the town was Vuk Radić. That census recorded that five of the citizens were immigrants, meaning that others lived there before Ottomans conquered the town.

In the outset of the Ottoman rule, the town had one Orthodox and one Catholic church. In the first quarter of the 17th century, the town had three mosques, two tekkes and three medreses.

From 1699, the town was part of the Habsburg monarchy. It was included in the Habsburg Military Frontier. Between 1750 and 1763, the town was under civil administration (in the Batsch-Bodrog County of the Habsburg Kingdom of Hungary), until it was returned to the jurisdiction of the Military Frontier (Šajkaš Battalion). Between 1763 and 1873, it was the headquarters of the Šajkaš Battalion which, using small armed vessels on the Danube, defended the Austrian border from Turkish attack. However, as early as 1750, the riverboat patrols, manned by the Šajkaš regiments, had begun to operate at Titel.

When the Military Frontier was abolished, the Serbs emigrated to Russia in massive numbers. At that time, Banat and the Šajkaš area slowly began to lose its distinctive Serbian character. Hungarians, Germans, Slovaks, Ruthenians and others began to move into the region.

In 1848 and 1849, Titel was part of Serbian Vojvodina, a Serb autonomous region within the Habsburg Empire. Between 1849 and 1872, it was again part of the Military Frontier, and after 1872, it came under civil administration as a part of the Bács-Bodrog County within the Habsburg Kingdom of Hungary (part of Austria-Hungary).

In 1910 there were 5,792 inhabitants: 2,413 Serbs and 1,858 Hungarians. By religion, there were 2,353 Serbian Orthodox; 2,479 Roman Catholics; and 89 Jews.

After 1918, the town became part of the Kingdom of Serbs, Croats and Slovenes and subsequent South Slavic states. During the World War II Hungarian occupation, in a 1942 raid, 51 inhabitants of the town were murdered, of whom 45 were men, 1 child, and 5 old people. By nationality, victims included 49 Serbs, and 1 Jew.

== Inhabited places ==
Titel municipality encompasses the town of Titel, and the following villages:

- Vilovo
- Gardinovci
- Lok
- Mošorin
- Šajkaš

== Demographics ==
Historical population
Year	Pop.	±% p.a.
2011	15,738	—
2022	13,984	−1.07%

As of 2011 census, the municipality of Titel had a population of 15,738 inhabitants.

=== Ethnic groups ===
The total population of the Titel municipality was 15,738, including:

- 13,615 Serbs (86.51%)
- 822 Hungarians (5.22%)
- 264 Romani (1.68%)
- 1037 other and undeclared.

All settlements in the municipality have an ethnic Serb majority.

== Economy ==
The following table gives a preview of total number of employed people per their core activity (as of 2017):

Activity	Total
Agriculture, forestry and fishing	195
Mining	-
Processing industry	332
Distribution of power, gas and water	2
Distribution of water and water waste management	46
Construction	83
Wholesale and retail, repair	387
Traffic, storage and communication	61
Hotels and restaurants	68
Media and telecommunications	39
Finance and insurance	11
Property stock and charter	-
Professional, scientific, innovative and technical activities	40
Administrative and other services	7
Administration and social assurance	147
Education	240
Healthcare and social work	79
Art, leisure and recreation	11
Other services	40
Total	1,787

== Notable people ==
- Svetozar Miletić (1826–1901), advocate, politician, mayor of Novi Sad, the political leader of Serbs in Vojvodina. He was born in the village Mošorin in Titel municipality.
- Mileva Marić (1875–1948), Serbian mathematician, and Albert Einstein's first wife. She was born in Titel.
- Isidora Sekulić (1877–1958), writer. She was born in the village of Mošorin in the Titel municipality.
- Dušan "Duško" Popov, Serb double agent, on whom author Ian Fleming based his character James Bond.
- Dragomir Lalin (1924-2013), was born in Titel. He was a Serbian dissident, under the regime of Josip Broz Tito. Dragomir Lalin was the founder of Milan Vidak wire factory and Garant auto engine parts factory in Futog.

== Gallery ==
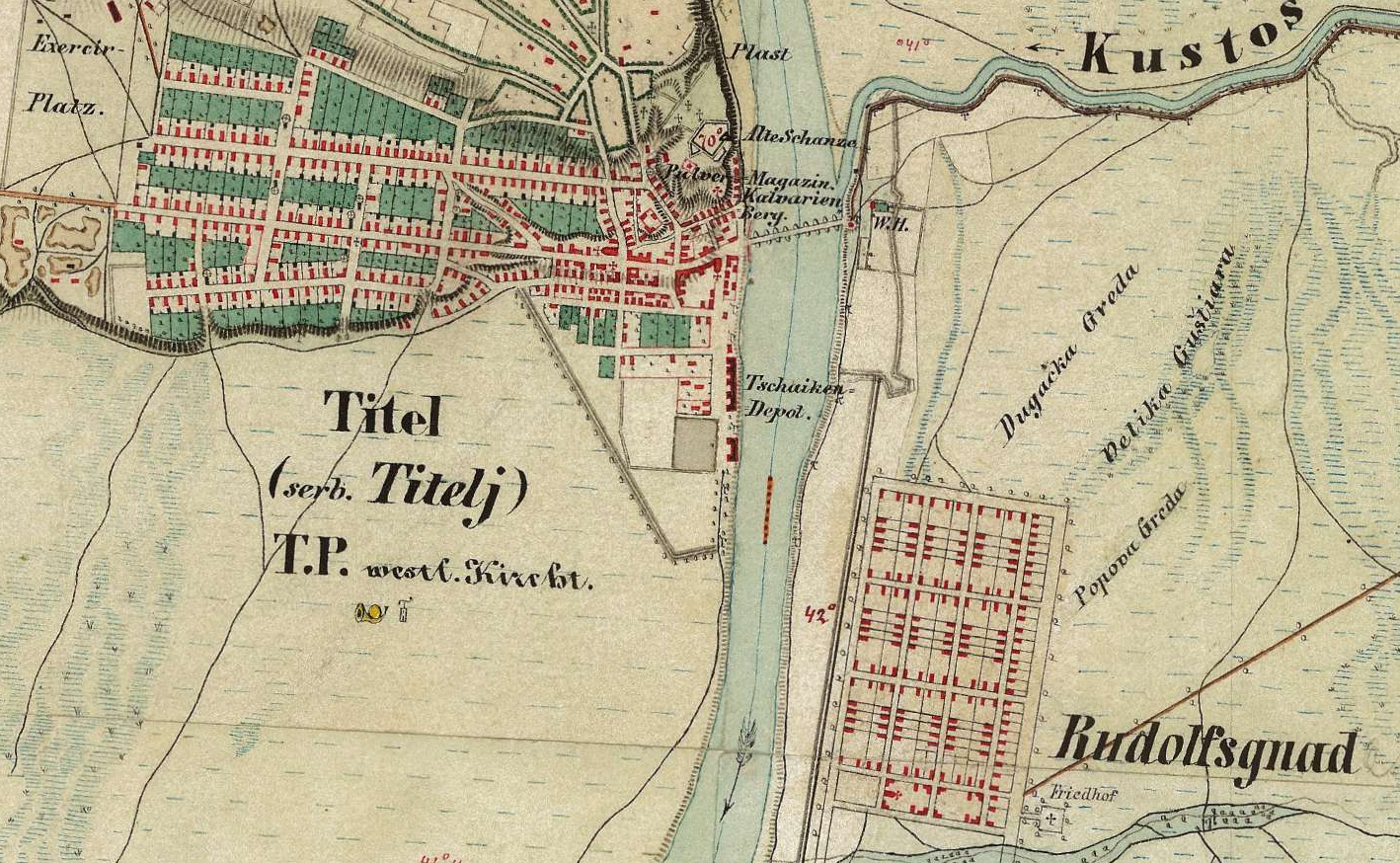
Titel, as it is shown on the Franciscan Land Survey 1806-1869 (Second Military Mapping Survey)

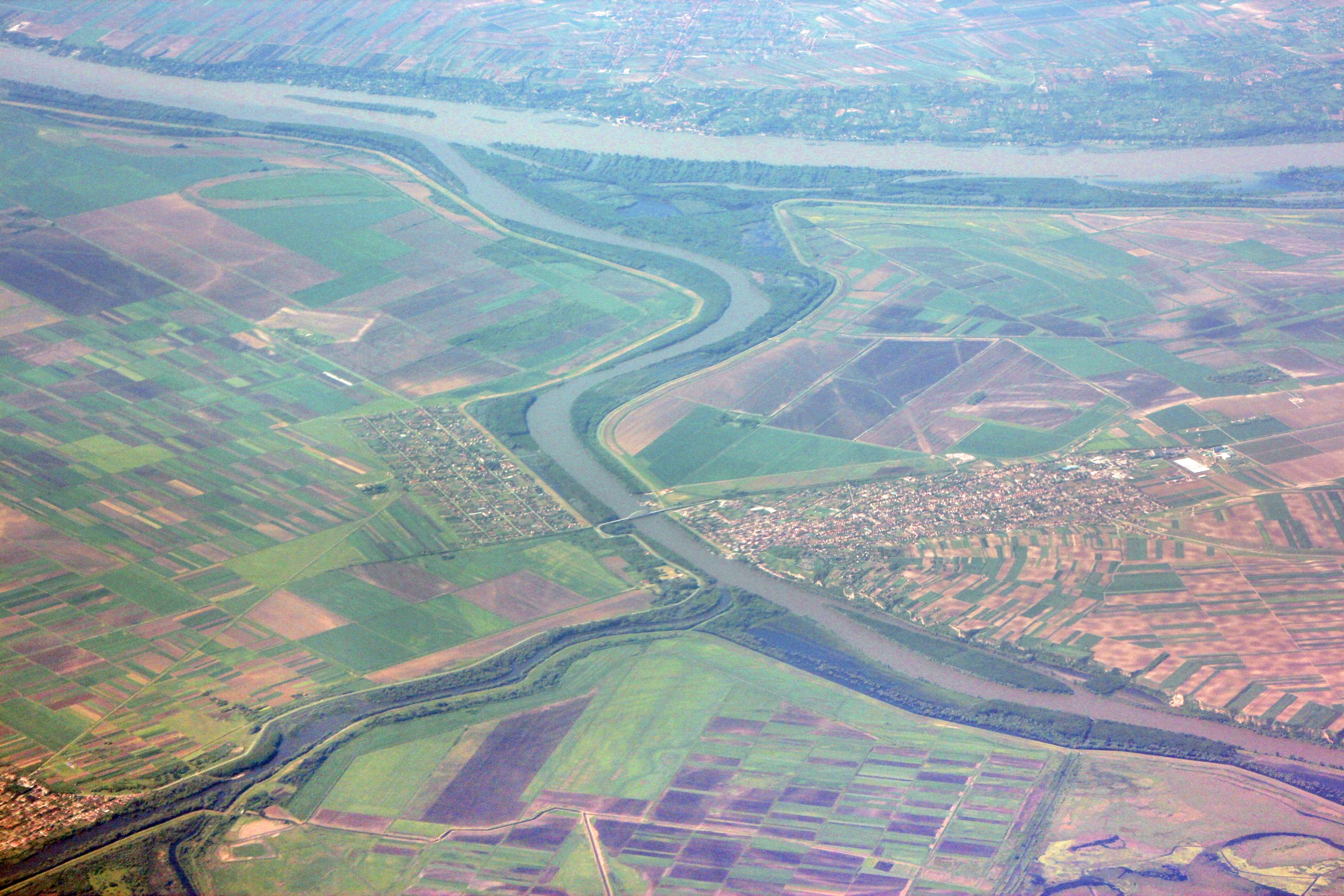
Aerial view

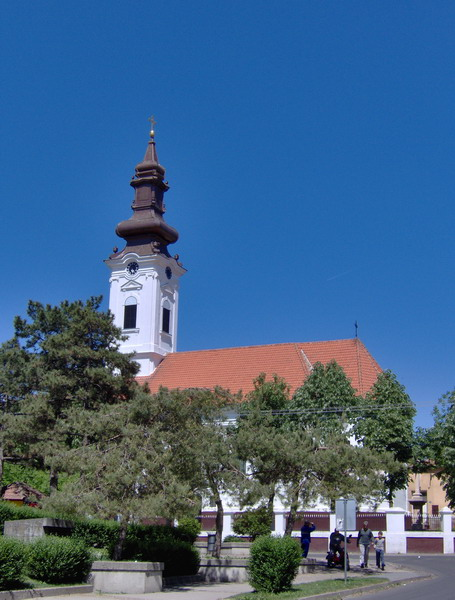
Serbian Orthodox Church of the Dormition of the Theotokos

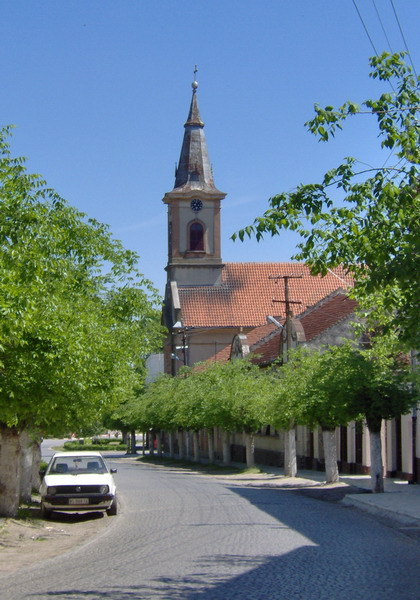
Catholic Church in Titel

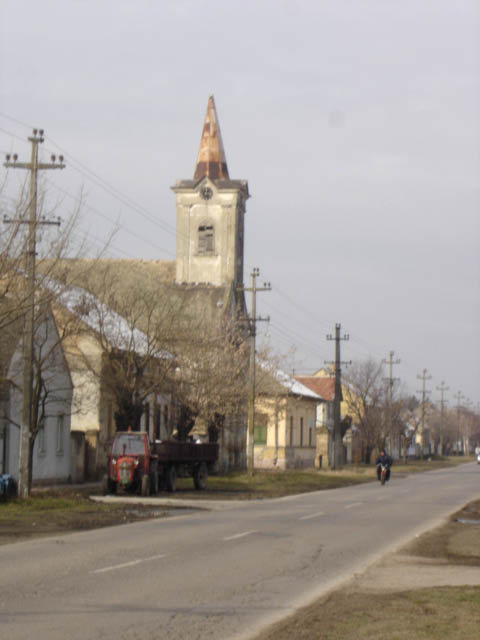
Abandoned church in Titel

== See also ==
- Šajkaška
- South Bačka District
- List of places in Serbia
- List of cities, towns and villages in Vojvodina
- Municipalities of Serbia

== Sources ==
- Marko Jovanov, Devet vekova od pomena imena Titela, Titelski letopis, Titel, 2001
