= Lok, Serbia =

Lok Лок (Serbian) Sajkáslak (Hungarian)
- Village (Selo)
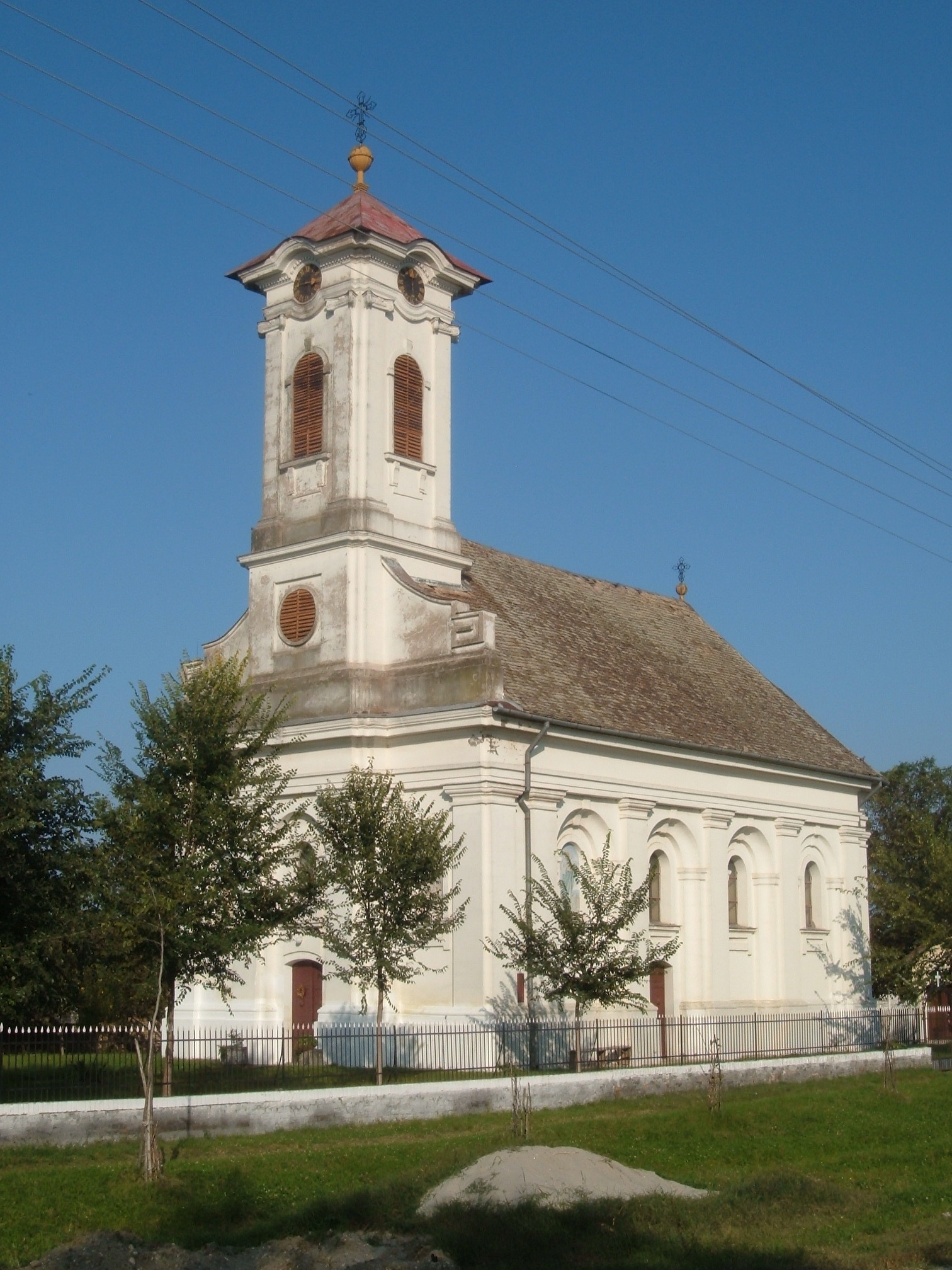
- The Orthodox Church

- Location within Vojvodina Location within Serbia Location within Europe
- Coordinates: 45°13′N 20°13′E
- Country: Serbia
- Province: Vojvodina
- District: South Bačka District
- Municipality: Titel

Area
  - Total: 29.8 km^{2} (11.5 sq mi)
- Elevation: 80 m (260 ft)

Population (2011)
  - Total: 1,114
  - Density: 37.4/km^{2} (96.8/sq mi)
- Time zone: UTC+1 (CET)
  - Summer (DST): UTC+2 (CEST)

Lok (Serbian Cyrillic: Лок; Hungarian: Sajkáslak) is a village in the Titel municipality of the South Bačka District in Vojvodina, Serbia. It has a population of over 1,114 people, and has a Serb ethnic majority as of the 2011 population census.

== Geography ==
Due to its alluvial plain, the Danube river has formed sandbars and islands over time that have relative heights of five to six meters. They now dominate the lower and wetter areas of the terrain.

== Notable people ==
- Đorđe Vujkov, footballer
- Avram Miletić, teacher and poet

== See also ==
- List of cities, towns and villages in Vojvodina
