= Ilma Rakusa =

Swiss writer and translator (born 1946)

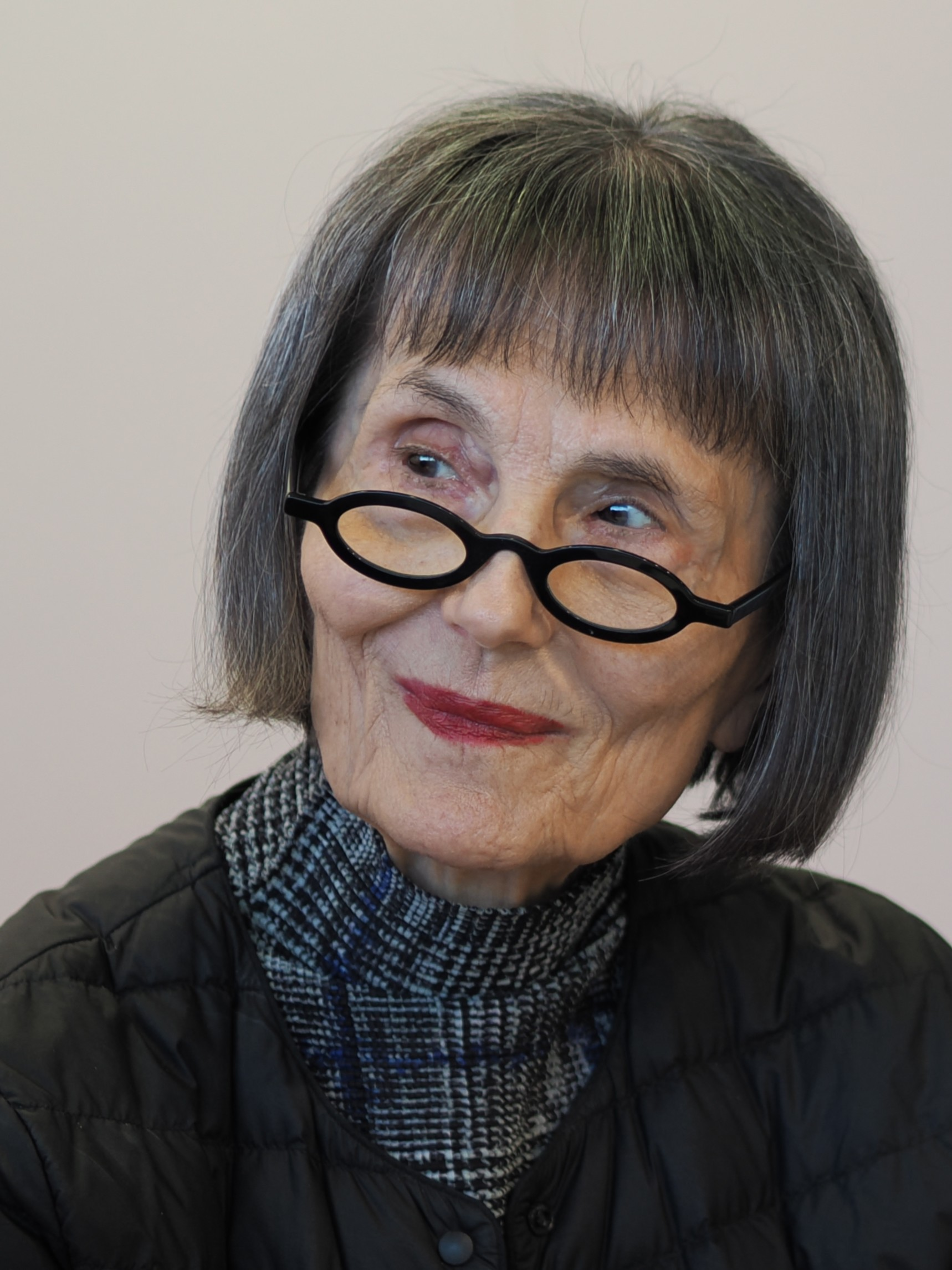
- Ilma Rakusa in 2025
- Born: 2 January 1946 (age 80); Rimavská Sobota, Slovakia
- Occupations: Writer; translator; professor
- Writing career
- Years active: 1971–present
- Genres: Prose, poetry
- Notable work: Mehr Meer (2009)
- Notable awards: Petrarca-Übersetzerpreis (1991); Adelbert von Chamisso Prize (2003); Swiss Book Prize (2009); Kleist Prize (2019)
- Website: www.ilmarakusa.info

Ilma Rakusa (born 2 January 1946) is a Swiss writer and translator. She translates French, Russian, Serbo-Croatian and Hungarian into German.

== Biography ==
Ilma Rakusa was born in 1946 in Rimavská Sobota, Slovakia to a Slovenian father and a Hungarian mother. She spent her early childhood in Budapest, Ljubljana and Trieste. In 1951, her family moved to Zürich, Switzerland. Ilma Rakusa attended the Volksschule and the Gymnasium in Zürich. After the Matura, she studied Slavic and Romance Languages and Literature in Zürich, Paris and Leningrad between 1965 and 1971.

In 1971, she was awarded a doctorate for her thesis titled Studien zum Motiv der Einsamkeit in der russischen Literatur, about themes of loneliness in Russian literature. From 1971 to 1977, she was a Wissenschaftlicher Assistent at the Slavic Seminar at the University of Zurich (UZH). From 1977 to 2006, she worked at UZH as a Lehrbeauftragter.

In 1977, Rakusa authored her first book, a collection of poems titled Wie Winter. She has since published numerous collections of poetry, short stories and essays. Rakusa works as a translator from French, Russian, Serbo-Croatian and Hungarian into German. She has translated works by authors including the French novelist Marguerite Duras, the Russian writer Aleksey Remizov, the Hungarian author Imre Kertész, the Russian poet Marina Tsvetaeva and the Serbo-Croatian Danilo Kiš. Rakusa also works as a journalist (Neue Zürcher Zeitung and Die Zeit). Rakusa's novel Mehr Meer (2009) has been translated into many languages and received the Swiss Book Prize in 2009.

Rakusa has been a member of the Deutsche Akademie für Sprache und Dichtung since 1996 and the jury of the Zuger Übersetzer-Stipendium. In 2010/2011, she was a fellow at the Berlin Institute for Advanced Study.

Today, Ilma Rakusa lives as a freelance writer in Zürich.

== Awards and honors ==
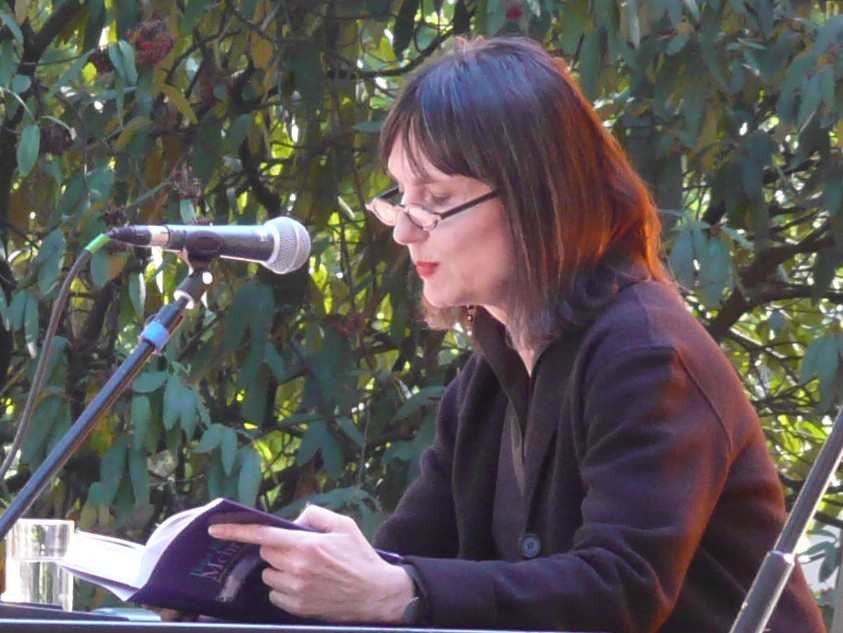
Ilma Rakusa at the Erlanger Poetenfest 2009

- 1987: Hieronymusring of the Verband deutschsprachiger Übersetzer
- 1991: Petrarca translation award
- 1995: Swiss Writer-in-residence Max Kade Institute at the University of Southern California
- 1998: Leipzig Book Award for European Understanding (Commendation Award)
- 1998: Schillerpreis der Zürcher Kantonalbank
- 2003: Pro Cultura Hungarica
- 2003: Adelbert von Chamisso Prize
- 2004: Johann-Jakob-Bodmer-Medaille der Stadt Zürich
- 2005: Vilenica International Literary Prize
- 2005 Chamisso-Poetikdozentur by the Mitteleuropazentrum of the Technical University of Dresden and the Sächsische Akademie der Künste
- 2009: Swiss Book Prize for Mehr Meer. Erinnerungspassagen.
- 2010/2011: Fellow at the Berlin Institute for Advanced Study
- 2015: Manès-Sperber-Preis
- 2017: Berliner Literaturpreis
- 2019: Kleist Prize
- 2023: Cultural award from the city of Zurich
- 2025: Golden Medal of Honor of the canton of Zurich
- 2025: Johann-Heinrich-Merck-Preis

== Bibliography ==
- Studien zum Motiv der Einsamkeit in der russischen Literatur (Thesis). Bern: Herbert Lang Verlag. 1973.
- Wie Winter. Gedichte. Zürich: Edition Howeg. 1977.
- Sinai (Photo-Text Book). Zürich: Edition Howeg. 1980.
- Die Insel. Erzählung. Frankfurt: Suhrkamp Verlag. 1982.
- Miramar. Erzählungen. Frankfurt: Suhrkamp Verlag. 1986.
- Leben. 15 Akronyme. Zürich: Edition Howeg. 1990.
- Steppe. Erzählungen. Frankfurt: Suhrkamp Verlag. 1990.
- Rakusa, Ilma; Walter, Regine (1992). Les mots / morts. Gedichte. Zürich: Edition Howeg.
- Jim. Sieben Dramolette. Frankfurt: Suhrkamp Verlag. 1993.
- Farbband und Randfigur. Vorlesungen zur Poetik. Graz: Literaturverlag Droschl. 1994.
- Ein Strich durch alles. 90 Neunzeiler. Frankfurt: Suhrkamp Verlag. 1997.
- Love after love. Acht Abgesänge. Frankfurt: Suhrkamp Verlag. 2001. ISBN 3-518-12251-7.
- Von Ketzern und Klassikern. Streifzüge durch die russische Literatur. Frankfurt: Suhrkamp Verlag. 2003. ISBN 3-518-12325-4.
- Langsamer! Gegen Atemlosigkeit, Akzeleration und andere Zumutungen (3 ed.). Graz: Literaturverlag Droschl. 2006. ISBN 3-85420-692-5.
- Stille. Zeit. Essays. Salzburg: Tartin Editionen. 2005.
- Durch Schnee. Erzählungen und Prosaminiaturen. Frankfurt: Suhrkamp Verlag. 2006. ISBN 3-518-45794-2. (Afterword by Kathrin Röggla)
- Zur Sprache gehen. Dresdner Chamisso-Poetikvorlesungen 2005. Dresden: Thelem Universitätsverlag. 2006. ISBN 3-937672-49-4.
- Garten, Züge. Eine Erzählung und 10 Gedichte. Ottensheim: Edition Thanhäuser. 2006.
- Mehr Meer. Erinnerungspassagen. Graz: Literaturverlag Droschl. 2009. ISBN 978-3-85420-760-3.
- Aufgerissene Blicke. Berlin-Journal. Graz: Literaturverlag Droschl. 2013. ISBN 978-3-85420-836-5.
- Einsamkeit mit rollendem "r". Erzählungen. Graz: Literaturverlag Droschl. 2014. ISBN 978-3-85420-953-9.
- Autobiographisches Schreiben als Bildungsroman. Stefan Zweig Poetikvorlesung. Vienna: Sonderzahl Verlag. 2014. ISBN 978-3-85449-408-9.
- Impressum: Langsames Licht. Gedichte. Graz: Literaturverlag Droschl. 2016. ISBN 978-3-85420-949-2.
- Pils, Holger Pils; von Ammon, Frieder, eds. (2016). Listen, Litaneien, Loops. Zwischen poetischer Anrufung und Inventur. Münchner Reden zur Poesie. Munich: Lyrik Kabinett. ISBN 978-3-938776-42-1.
- Mein Alphabet. Graz: Literaturverlag Droschl. 2019. ISBN 978-3-990590-32-4.
- Kein Tag ohne. Gedichte. Graz: Literaturverlag Droschl. 2022. ISBN 978-3-99059-117-8.
- Wo bleibt das Licht. Tagebuchprosa. Graz: Literaturverlag Droschl. 2025. ISBN 978-3-99059-192-5.

=== As editor ===
- Rakusa, Ilma; Ingold, Felix Philipp, eds. (1972). Gedichte an Gott sind Gebete. Zürich: Arche Verlag.
- Solzhenitsyn, Aleksandr (1973). Rakusa, Ilma; Ingold, Felix Philipp (eds.). Kirche und Politik. Bericht, Dokument, Erzahlung. Zürich: Arche Verlag.
- Einsamkeiten. Ein Lesebuch. Zürich: Arche Verlag. 1975.
- Rakusa, Ilma; Schmid, Hugo, eds. (1979). Russische Kinder. Zürich: Arche Verlag.
- Dostojewskij in der Schweiz. Ein Reader. Frankfurt: Insel Verlag. 1981.
- Marguerite Duras. Materialienband. Frankfurt: Suhrkamp Verlag. 1988.
- Akhmatova, Anna (1988). Gedichte. Frankfurt: Suhrkamp Verlag.
- Kiš, Danilo (1994). Homo poeticus. Gespräche und Essays. Munich: Carl Hanser Verlag.
- Brodsky, Joseph (1997). Haltestelle in der Wüste. Gedichte. Frankfurt: Suhrkamp Verlag.
- Tsvetaeva, Marina (2002). Versuch, eifersüchtig zu sein. Gedichte. Frankfurt: Suhrkamp Verlag.
- Rakusa, Ilma; Keller, Ursula, eds. (2003). Europa schreibt. Was ist das Europäische an den Literaturen Europas? Essays aus 33 europäischen Ländern. Hamburg: Körber-Stiftung.
- Rakusa, Ilma; Bennis, Mohammed, eds. (2007). Die Minze erblüht in der Minze. Arabische Dichtung der Gegenwart. Munich: Carl Hanser Verlag.
- Kiš, Danilo (2014). Familienzirkus. Die großen Romane und Erzählungen. Munich: Carl Hanser Verlag.

=== Translations into German ===
- Tsvetaeva, Marina (1973). Prosa. Translated by Rakusa, Ilma; Ingold, Felix Philipp. Zürich: Benziger.
- Duras, Marguerite (1984). Sommer 1980. Frankfurt am Main: Suhrkamp Verlag. ISBN 3-518-11205-8.
- Remizov, Aleksey (1981). Der goldene Kaftan und andere russische Märchen. Zürich: Manesse Verlag. ISBN 3-7175-1600-0.
- Duras, Marguerite (1985). Der Liebhaber. Frankfurt am Main: Suhrkamp Verlag. ISBN 3-518-03243-7.
- Kiš, Danilo (1986). Ein Grabmal für Boris Dawidowitsch. Frankfurt am Main: Suhrkamp Verlag. ISBN 3-518-01928-7.
- Tsvetaeva, Marina (1987). Mutter und die Musik. Autobiographische Prosa. Frankfurt am Main: Suhrkamp Verlag. ISBN 3-518-01941-4.
- Duras, Marguerite (1988). Das tägliche Leben. Frankfurt am Main: Suhrkamp Verlag. ISBN 3-518-11508-1.
- Kiš, Danilo (1988). Sanduhr. Munich: Carl Hanser Verlag. ISBN 3-446-14276-2.
- Prishvin, Mikhail (1988). Meistererzählungen. Zürich: Manesse Verlag. ISBN 3-7175-1752-X.
- Duras, Marguerite (1990). Im Sommer abends um halb elf. Frankfurt am Main: Suhrkamp Verlag. ISBN 3-518-40230-7.
- Tsvetaeva, Marina (1990). Phoenix. Versdrama in drei Bildern. Frankfurt am Main: Suhrkamp Verlag. ISBN 3-518-22057-8.
- Kaplan, Leslie (1991). Das Buch der Himmel. Gedichte. Zürich: Ferdydurke Verlag. ISBN 3-905604-02-7.
- Tsvetaeva, Marina (1992). Im Feuer geschrieben. Ein Leben in Briefen. Frankfurt am Main: Suhrkamp Verlag. ISBN 3-518-40493-8.
- Kiš, Danilo (1996). Der Heimatlose. Munich: Carl Hanser Verlag. ISBN 3-446-18758-8.
- Remizov, Aleksey (1996). Die Geräusche der Stadt. Frankfurt am Main: Suhrkamp Verlag. ISBN 3-518-22204-X.
- Kertész, Imre (1998). Ich, ein anderer. Berlin: Rowohlt Verlag. ISBN 3-87134-334-X.
- Nádas, Péter (1999). Ohne Pause. Reinbek: Rowohlt Verlag. ISBN 3-499-22578-6.
- Tsvetaeva, Marina (1999). Ein Abend nicht von dieser Welt. Frankfurt am Main: Suhrkamp Verlag. ISBN 3-518-22317-8.
- Chekhov, Anton (2000). Die Möwe. Burgtheater Wien.
- Kiš, Danilo (2007). Die mechanischen Löwen. Translated by Rakusa, Ilma; Urban, Peter. Munich: Carl Hanser Verlag. ISBN 978-3-446-20832-2.
