= Sonja Veselinović =

Sonja Veselinović (Serbian-Cyrillic: Соња Веселиновић; born 1981 in Novi Sad, Yugoslavia) is Serbian a professor of comparative literature at Faculty of Philosophy of the Novi Sad University. She teaches courses in 19th and 20th-century world and Serbian literature, translation theory, modern drama, and interdisciplinary studies.

== Biography ==
Sonja Veselinović studied comparative literature at the Faculty of Philosophy of the University of Novi Sad, graduated with Magister degree in 2009 and obtained her doctorate as PhD in 2014. In 2016, she became assistant professor (docent) at the department of comparative literature of that university.

A female literary scholar and artist, she has been a member of Polja editorial staff since 2007; the same year she accepted first prize at the Festival of Young Poets (Serbian: Festival mladih pesnika) in Zaječar. Her manuscript Poema preko (Poem across) was published as book a year later – poetry about the way of individual being, narrator figure (first-person narrative) addresses Marina Tsvetaeva in dealing with issues of identity, creativity and self-fulfillment. This fragmentary, intertextual and discursive text is seeking for limits of subjective representation through different personas and vivid imagery. An excerpt of that work has been published in Hungarian and German translation.

In 2009, she participated in a reading by Denny Rosenthal during German Cultural Days in Novi Sad, and she was supported by Borislav Pekić Foundation. Belgrade's Goethe-Institute selected her for participation as one of the Serbian artistic representants at the European Borderlands Festival 2010 of Allianz Cultural Foundation. She was invited guest of the Committee on Cultural and Media Affairs of the German Bundestag in cooperation with the Brandenburg Gate Foundation at the Leipzig Book Fair 2011. She is also laureate of the Isidora Sekulić Award 2013 for her prose Krosfejd. The title is the Serbian term for Crossfade. This prose can be described as mixture (crossfade) of two inner voices of the main character, its fragmented narration, intertextuality and imagery reflects motifs of longing for love and self-knowledge in searching for individual authenticity.

Veselinović compiled the work edition of Ivan V. Lalić for volume 86 of the anthology Ten Centuries of Serbian Literature of Matica srpska, and her study on specific topic from a novel of Danilo Kiš (child perspective in Garden, Ashes) has been published in volume 1 of Slavic studies of the University of Graz. The scholar gave a lecture on Yugoslav Black Wave at Martin Luther University of Halle-Wittenberg in 2018. So far, in addition to her scientific work, she devoted herself to the translation of few English and French works of John Ashbury, Jean Giraudoux, Milan Kundera and Jacques Rancière into Serbian.

She was member of Jury of Desanka Maksimović Awards 2018 and 2019.

== Awards ==
- Isidora Sekulić Award, 2013

== Bibliography (selection) ==
- Poema preko (Poem across), Dom omladine, Zaječar 2008, ISBN 978-86-905459-4-0, prose.
- Prevodilačka poetika Ivana V. Lalića (Translation Poetics of Ivan V. Lalić), Akademska knjiga, Novi Sad 2012, ISBN 978-86-6263-001-8.
- Krosfejd, Kulturni centar Novog Sada, Novi Sad 2013, ISBN 978-86-7931-310-2, prose.
- Kind und Jugendlicher in der Literatur und im Film Bosniens, Kroatiens und Serbiens (Child and Adolescent in the Literature and in the Film of Bosnia, Croatia and Serbia), edited by Renate Hansen-Kokoruš & Elena Popovska, Band 1, Grazer Studien zur Slawistik, Kovač, Hamburg 2013, ISBN 978-3-8300-6789-4.
- Recepcija, kanon, ciljna kultura : slika modernog angloameričkog pesništva u savremenoj srpskoj književnosti (Reception, canon, target culture: picture of modern Anglo-American poetry in contemporary Serbian literature), Akademska knjiga, Novi Sad 2018, ISBN 978-86-6263-189-3.

Biljana i Ostali: poetika i politika Biljane Jovanović, Kulturni centar Novog Sada, Novi Sad, 2025. ISBN 978-86-6192-079-0
