= Early Sorrows =

1970 book by Danilo Kiš

Early Sorrows: For Children and Sensitive Readers
- Author: Danilo Kiš
- Original title: Rani jadi:za decu i osetljive
- Translator: Michael Henry Heim
- Language: Serbo-Croatian
- Publisher: Nolit (Serbo-Croatian); New Directions (English)
- Publication date: 1970
- Publication place: Serbia
- English publication date: 1998
- Pages: 118 (English 1st edition)
- Followed by: Garden, Ashes

Early Sorrows: For Children and Sensitive Readers (Serbo-Croatian: Rani jadi: Za decu i osetljive; Serbian Cyrillic: Рани јади: За децу и осетљиве) is a collection of nineteen short stories by Yugoslav author Danilo Kiš.

The book is part of what Kiš called his "family cycle" trilogy, consisting of the novels Garden, Ashes (1965), and Hourglass (1972). Though Early Sorrows was published after Garden, Ashes, it is effectively the first novel in the trilogy.

== Summary ==
Early Sorrows is composed of vignettes about Andy Sam, a young Serbian boy who works as a cowherd to bring in money for his family. Andy spends most of the day reading.

== Themes ==
Like much of Kiš's work, Early Sorrows deals with the Holocaust. Andy's father, like Kiš's own father, is sent to Auschwitz. Notably, it is the only work of Kiš's in which he depicts a scene inside a concentration camp (Andy hallucinates about his relatives who were taken away by Nazis).
