= Association of Writers of Vojvodina =

- Друштво књижевника Војводине (Serbian); Vajdasági Írók Egyesülete (Hungarian); Združenie spisovateľov Vojvodiny (Slovak); Asociația Scriitorilor din Voivodina (Romanian); Дружтво писательох Войводини (Pannonian Rusyn)
- Formation: 1976
- Founded at: Novi Sad
- Type: writers professional organization
- Legal status: umbrella organisation
- Headquarters: Braće Ribnikar 5
- Location: Novi Sad, Serbia
- Origins: Association of Writers of Serbia
- President of the Executive Board: Jovan Zivlak
- Website: dkv.org.rs

The Association of Writers of Vojvodina (Serbian: Друштво књижевника Војводине, romanized: Društvo književnika Vojvodine, Hungarian: Vajdasági Írók Egyesülete) is an literary umbrella organisation in Vojvodina, Serbia. Founded as a section of the Association of Writers of Serbia in 1966 it became an independent organization in 1976. Association gathers writers who create in all the official languages spoken in the region, with a particular focus on works created in Serbian and Hungarian. The Association has played an important role in Vojvodina literary and cultural life, organizing various events, including literary discussions, workshops and festivals. In 2006 the Association founded the International Novi Sad Literature Festival.

== History ==
=== SFR Yugoslavia ===
In 1977, the republic level Association of Writers of Serbia reacted to a statement made by Oskar Davičo in an interview in Oko magazine. Davičo had suggested that in his opinion the Association of Writers of Serbia is the primary organization for all writers in SR Serbia, including SAP Vojvodina and SAP Kosovo. The Association of Writers of Serbia responded by clarifying that there are in fact three independent organizations all of which independently and equally participate in the activities of the Association of Writers of Yugoslavia and that one of three is the Association of Writers of Vojvodina.

The Association of Writers of Vojvodina was among the institutions represented in the ad hoc Commission for the Advancement of Language and Speech of Radio Television of Novi Sad, formed in 1981 to support the development and promotion of standard Serbo-Croatian, Hungarian, Slovak, Romanian, and Pannonian Rusyn languages.

In the 1986 Milenko Vučetić, the secretary of the Archive of Communist Writers of the Association of Writers of Serbia, emphasized that the Writers' Association of Vojvodina, while independent, was also a collective member of the Association of Writers of Serbia, maintaining its autonomy but participating fully in the national body. In December of the same year Writers' Union of Kosovo, the Vojvodina Association and the Association of Writers of Serbia agreed to establish the Meetings of Writers of the Socialist Republic of Serbia as a permanent literary and cultural joint manifestation.

In 1991 the Association of Writers of Vojvodina was included in the final agreement on cultural cooperation between SFR Yugoslavia and Malta, both of which were at the time Mediterranean member states of the Non-Aligned Movement. in which association was to organize bilateral 7 days exchange with the Maltese Association of Writers.

=== SR Yugoslavia (Serbia and Montenegro) ===
In 1993 the Association announced the intention to establish of literary departments in all Vojvodina cities where its literary communities operate. The first one was recently founded in Sombor, where ten members of DKV live and work.

In 1994, writer Boško Ivkov called for an extraordinary assembly of the Association of Writers of Vojvodina after the organization's multilingual nameplate was replaced with a monolingual Serbian Cyrillic sign. Ivkov argued that the removal of the multilingual nameplate and its replacement with a monolingual one violated the organization's statute, which explicitly listed its name in multiple languages. In an open letter, he contended that this act not only breached the association's founding principles but also undermined the essence of literary dialogue and cultural diversity, ultimately affecting the broader cultural coexistence in Vojvodina.

In 1998 the association together with the Association of Writers of Serbia and Serb dominated Writers' Society of Kosovo and Metohija adopted a Gračanica Monastery Declaration of June 9.

Following the Overthrow of Slobodan Milošević on 5 October 2000, Vojvodina writers expressed shock over the events that took place at the November 2000 annual assembly of the Association of Writers of Serbia in Belgrade. President of the Board of Directors of the Vojvodina Association Selimir Radulović expressed the protest of Vojvodina's writers against the atmosphere of intolerance that marked the assembly and their disbelief of the fact that writers could be beaten at a legal gathering of their own association.

=== Since 2006 ===
In 2016 the association awarded the lifetime achievement award to Irina Hardi Kovačević a Pannonian Rusyn writer. In 2024 Association welcomed Jamaican writer Jason Allen-Paisant who attended the International Novi Sad Literature Festival.

== See also ==
- International Novi Sad Literature Festival
- Polja (literary magazine)
- Serbian Literary Guild
- Matica srpska
- Book Talk
- Association of Writers of Republika Srpska
