= Jovan Zivlak =

Serbian poet, publisher and essayist

- Photo by Igor Živkić, 2015.
- Born: Jovan Zivlak; 21 September 1947 (church) 9 October 1947 (civil); Nakovo, Federal People's Republic of Yugoslavia - Republic of Serbia
- Occupations: Writer and publisher
- Spouse(s): Jovanka Nikolić (1952), writer
- Writing career
- Notable awards: Stanislav Vinaver (1995), City of Novi Sad October Award (2001), Vasko Popa Award (2015)

Jovan Zivlak (born. 1947, in Nakovo, Serbia), is a Serbian poet, publisher and essayist.

== Life and career ==
Jovan Zivlak was born in 1947 in Serbian Nakovo in Banat, a region of Vojvodina, near the Romanian border. He ended his secondary school education in Kikinda, and graduated from the University of Novi Sad with a degree in Serbian language and literature. He was editor for the magazine Polja. Zivlak was also the editor in chief of Svetovi publishing from 1985 to 2007. He is currently the manager of Adresa publishing. He is the founder and, since 2001, has been editor in chief of the magazine for literature, art, culture and thought, Zlatna Greda. He has been the president and (current) vice-president of the Association of Writers of Vojvodina and head of the International Novi Sad Literature Festival. Zivlak has edited works by well-known Serbian writers and has written studies about them.

Jovan Zivlak has published thirteen volumes of poetry, three of essays in Serbian to date and his poetry has been translated into various languages.

His poems focus on the gaps in reality, and his poetry is influenced by the art of discretion, a stage for painful absence. Based on a distrust of the present, Zivlak refers to metaphysical knowledge and places the action of the subject over the modern in the foreground. As an expression of metaphysical self-exploration his language transmits clear and solidly structured images, fragmentary impressions and deep reflections that seek to decode the mystery of the modern world. "Zivlak's spiritual and philosophical views provide the backdrop to their own morphology of society and culture in which the ambivalent role of man in relation to nature is expressed and, moreover, his position within his own culture and history is explored." (Dr Dragan Prole, Faculty of Philosophy, University of Novi Sad). Zivlak's poems are included in important anthologies of Serbian poetry at home and abroad, have been translated into numerous languages and have received many awards. He has won Vasko Popa for 2015, most prestigious national award for poetry in Serbia.

Jovan Zivlak has edited the following books: Jovan Dučić: Poems, 1996; Danilo Kiš: Аutopoetics, (essays), 1999; Dušan Vasiljev: Poems, 2000; Milorad Pavić: Panonian Legends, (stories), 2000; Laza Kostić: Between Dreaming and Waking, (poems), 2001; Selected Poetry of Dragan Jovanović Danilov, 2002; Laza Kostić, Poems, 2009; Аnthology of Branko Award 1954–2010, 2010, The Poetry and Aesthetics of Laza Kostić (a collection of papers), 2010, Djura Jakšić (a collection of papers), 2012, Branko Radičević (a collection of papers), 2012: Where is the Door (an anthology of poetry from the Novi Sad International Literature Festival - 10 years, 2015).

Zivlak has won numerous awards: Young Struga, 1974; Pavle Marković Adamov (for poetry),1992; Despot Stefan Lazarević's Crown (for poetry), 1993; Stanislav Vinaver (The Eating of a Book, for essay), 1995; Dušan Vasiljev (for poetry), 1997; Golden Badge of KPZ Serbia (literature and publishing), 1998; Writers' Association of Vojvodina Book of the Year Award, (The Shadows of Aura, for essay), 1999; Stevan Pešić Award (for complete work), 2001; City of Novi Sad October Award (for literature), 2001; Milica Stojadinović Srpkinja (for poetry), 2003; Great Charter of Bazjas (for poetry), Тimisoara, 2006; Dimitrije Mirtinovic Award (for poetry), 2010; Kočić's Pen, 2014; Arka's Award, 2015; Vasko Popa Award, 2015, Literary Scepter, (International award presented in Macedonia), 2016.

Numerous essays, studies, and a Master's thesis have all been written on Jovan Zivlak's poetry. Dr Nikola Strajnić (Faculty of Philosophy, University of Novi Sad) has published a monograph about his poetry titled The Invisible and Visible (2007). A symposium on his poetry, where fifteen writers participated, was held in Novi Sad in 2002. At the University of Banja Luka, Stevka Šmitran defended her PhD thesis on the subject of poetry Jovan Zivlak Chanting Anti-Utopia in the World of History (2005).

Jovan Zivlak lives and works in Novi Sad.

== Selected bibliography ==
=== Poetry ===
- Brodar (Sailor, 1969),
- Večernja škola (Evening School, 1974),
- Čestar (Copse, 1977),
- Tronožac (Tripod, 1979),
- Čekrk (Windlass, 1983),
- Napev (Melody, 1989),
- Zimski izveštaj (Winter Report, selection of poetry, 1989),
- Čegrtuša (Rattlesnake, 1991),
- Obretenje (Rotation, selection of poetry, 1993, 1994, 1995),
- Ostrvo (Island, 2001),
- Pesme 1979/2005 (Poems, 1979/2005, 2006)
- O gajdama (About Bagpipes, 2010)
- Oni su ušli u naš dom (They Have Entered Our Home, 2012)
- Pod oblacima (Under Clouds, 2014)

=== Essays ===
- Jedenje knjige (The Eating of a Book, 1996),
- Aurine senke (The Shadows of Aura, 1999).
- Sećanje i senke ( The Remembrance and shadows, 2007)

=== Collections of poetry translated under different titles ===
- Trépied (French, 1981),
- Penge (Hungarian, 1984),
- Trinožnik (Macedonian, 1985),
- Zol gostin (Macedonian, 1991),
- Il cuore del mascalazone (Italian, 1994),
- Zlý hosť (Slovak, 1997),
- Penitenta (Romanian, 1998),
- Poèmes choisis (French, 1999),
- Zol gostin i drugi pesni (Macedonian, 2007)
- Зъл гост и други стихове (Bulgarian, 2009)
- Gedichte, Mitlesbuch 79 (German, 2009)
- Despre gaide (Romanian, 2010)
- Szczeliny czasu (Polish, 2011)
- Слизане (Bulgarian, 2012)
- Winterbericht (German, 2013)
- Зимски извештај (Macedonian, 2014)
- Le roi des oies (French, 2014)
- Informe invernal (Spanish, 2014)
