= Garden, Ashes =

1965 novel by Danilo Kiš

First UK edition (publ. Faber & Faber)

Garden, Ashes (Serbo-Croatian: Bašta, pepeo) is a 1965 novel by Yugoslav author Danilo Kiš. Garden, Ashes is based on Kiš's childhood. An English translation, by William J. Hannaher, was published in 1975 by Harcourt.

== Content ==
The narrative is told from the perspective of a young boy, Andi Scham, who at the beginning of the novel resides in Novi Sad in Yugoslavia. His absent father, Eduard Schamm, is an eccentric and meticulous railway inspector and a writer whose unfinished work is the third edition of a travel guide called Bus, Ship, Rail and Air Travel Guide – the updated edition, which Scham will never complete, is to be encyclopedic in its scope. After being shot at by gendarme soldiers, Eduard relocates his family to Hungary where Andi enters primary school. Later Eduard is sent to a ghetto and is then deported to Auschwitz, never to return to his family. Eduard presumably dies in the camps, though Andi insists that his father has merely disappeared.

The narrative structure becomes more fractured after Eduard's departure. Andi imagines that his father is following him in disguise and invents stories about his parents' first meeting. Andi acknowledges that "ever since my father vanished from the story, from the novel, everything has come loose, fallen apart." In the final scene of the novel, Andi wanders through the same woods that were the setting for an earlier imagined encounter in which Eduard was accused of being an Allied spy. He claims that his father's "ghost" haunts those woods. Andi's mother encourages him to leave as it is getting dark.

Andi is incredibly imaginative, to a fault. He is plagued by recurring nightmares and is haunted by illusions of his father. Only toward the end of the novel, as he starts to read adventure novels, does he begin to constrain his imagination.

== Style ==
The novel is structured as a "loosely connected chronological sequence of half-explained adventures". Most of the focus is on the father, and what happens to the mother and child, living with difficulty in impoverished circumstances, is only partially explained. Refusing to give any moral judgment of the father, Kiš portrays him as a complex character, "enigmatic and half-crazed..., a man with an eloquent tongue and a fanciful mind who frequently abandoned family, sobriety, and reason", according to Murlin Croucher.

Though Andi is a child, his narratorial voice is remarkably mature. Mark Thompson describes Andi as a "hybrid narrator who blends the expressive power of an accomplished artist with the limited understanding-- but the unlimited imagination, or intuition-- of a young person."

== Autobiographical elements ==
Kiš openly acknowledged that the Scham family was based on his own family. “I am convinced that it is me, that it’s my father, my mother, my sister,” Kiš said in an interview on Garden, Ashes.

Eduard Scham resembles Kiš's own father (also named Eduard) in his appearance, eccentric personality, and career as a railway inspector-cum-travel guide author.

The events of the novel closely follow Kiš's actual life during World War II. Like his fictional counterpart, Eduard Kiš narrowly escaped a shooting death by gendarme officers in Novi Sad, then relocated his family to Hungary. Also like Scham, Eduard Kiš was confined to a ghetto and later sent to Auschwitz. As Andi does in the novel, Kiš himself would insist that his father had not died in the camps but had merely "disappeared."

== Themes and symbols ==
=== Singer sewing machine ===
A recurring symbol in the novel is Andi's mother's Singer sewing machine. Kiš describes the machine in detail and includes a sketch of the machine, so as to convey not only that Andi's mother uses the machine to create beauty but that the machine itself is beautiful. This beauty symbolizes home or the ability to feel at home. When the Schams flee to Hungary, the sewing machine is lost "in the confusion of war." This loss symbolizes how the war destroys Andi's home.

=== Death ===
Upon hearing that his uncle has died, Andi begins to dwell obsessively on his own mortality. This realization can be seen as Andi's first step toward self-analysis. Andi becomes determined to outwit death by catching "the angel of sleep." Though he is not successful in this endeavor, Andi's struggle with his own mortality reveals the character's sensitive nature and makes clear that Kiš does not idolize childhood innocence.

=== Dreams ===
Andi is plagued with nightmares throughout the novel. Intrusive thoughts about his own mortality often keep Andi from sleeping, and when he does fall asleep he is restless and plagued by nightmares. Andi has recurring dreams of conquering the "angel of death." These dreams are so terrifying that when he wakes up his first thoughts are "akin to mortal fear." Andi only overcomes these dreams when in his dreams he declares "I AM DREAMING," which subdues the angel. He then begins to channel his "darkest impulses" into his dreams, eating the poppyseed cakes that are denied him in his real life or pursuing a village woman with whom he is fascinated.

Žarko Martinović argues that Andi's nightmares are best classified as traumatic dreams. Sufferers of posttraumatic stress disorder often experience these types of dreams. Andi suppresses his nightmares by lucid dreaming. Kiš wrote Garden, Ashes long before lucid dreaming became a well-researched field of study.

== Origins of the title ==
The novel's title possibly derives from an accusation made by the Hungarian fascists against the father: (falsely) accused of being an Allied spy, an accusation the son wants to believe since it increases his father's heroic status, he is said to direct the Allied planes to deliver the bombs that turn "everything into dust and ashes". More generally, the Holocaust transforms objects of beauty ("gardens") into ashes.

== Publication and reception ==
Kiš described Garden, Ashes as part of his “family cycle” trilogy, consisting of Early Sorrows (1970), Garden, Ashes, and The Hourglass (1972). Garden, Ashes contains many scenes also present in Early Sorrows, including Andi's relationship with Julia Szabo, Eduard's departure, and the pogrom scene.

Kiš wrote Garden, Ashes while employed as a lector at the University of Strasbourg. Compared to his earlier novels, Kiš found Garden, Ashes much more difficult to write.

The novel "was greeted by the critics as a significant work by a promising young writer". By the time it was translated and published in English, it had already appeared in French, German, Polish, and Hungarian. English reviews were mixed but mostly positive. Murlin Croucher praised the "rich yet youthful and slightly hyperbolic style", though he felt that the book lacked an overall purpose. Croucher also remarked on the impossibility of distinguishing between fact and fiction, which became a hallmark of Kiš's work. Vasa Mihailovich comments on the novel's charm, which he says was unsurpassed even by Kiš's later "more sophisticated and mature books".

== Critical analysis ==
=== As a work of Holocaust literature ===
Many critics have examined the novel as a work of Holocaust literature. Like other authors who were young children during the Holocaust, Kiš uses literature to confront childhood traumas.

Garden, Ashes is unusual in that while it is ostensibly about the Holocaust, since Eduard dies in Auschwitz, Kiš makes few explicit references to the Holocaust. Aleksander Stević argues that Kiš chooses to have Andi suppress memories of the Holocaust so as to give Eduard autonomy. Andi imagines that his father is being persecuted for being a raving genius, rather than for being a Jew. For example, Andi describes his family's move to the suburbs following a pogrom as "guided by my father's star." Though the star in question is clearly the Star of David, Andi later refers to this star as "the star of his destiny," making the star into a symbol of his father's travels. With this choice, Kiš humanizes his father, who was stripped of his identity by the Holocaust.

=== Comparisons to Fatelessness ===
Garden, Ashes is often compared to Fatelessness, a 1975 semi-autobiographical novel by Hungarian author Imre Kertész. Mark Thompson describes Fatelessness as the "sequel or sibling" of Garden, Ashes. György, the protagonist of Fatelessness, bears resemblance to Andi in that his innocence blinds him to what is going on around him. György continually tries to normalize and reconcile what he has seen in the camps, as a way of coping with horrific events, much like how Andi suppresses images of the war.

Both Kertész and Kiš attempt to humanize victims of the Holocaust. When asked by reporters if the camps are as horrific as they've heard, György claims that at times he was "happy" in the camps, a form of resistance against a regime that wants to strip him of his emotional autonomy. This is similar to how in Garden, Ashes in how Andi continually portrays his father as an exceptional genius who is persecuted not for religion but for his genius.

Fatelessness and Garden, Ashes were published at a time when discussion on the Holocaust were discouraged by the Hungarian and Yugoslav governments. The novels are credited for inciting discourse on the Holocaust in these countries.
