= Guy Goffette =

Belgian-born poet and writer (1947–2024)

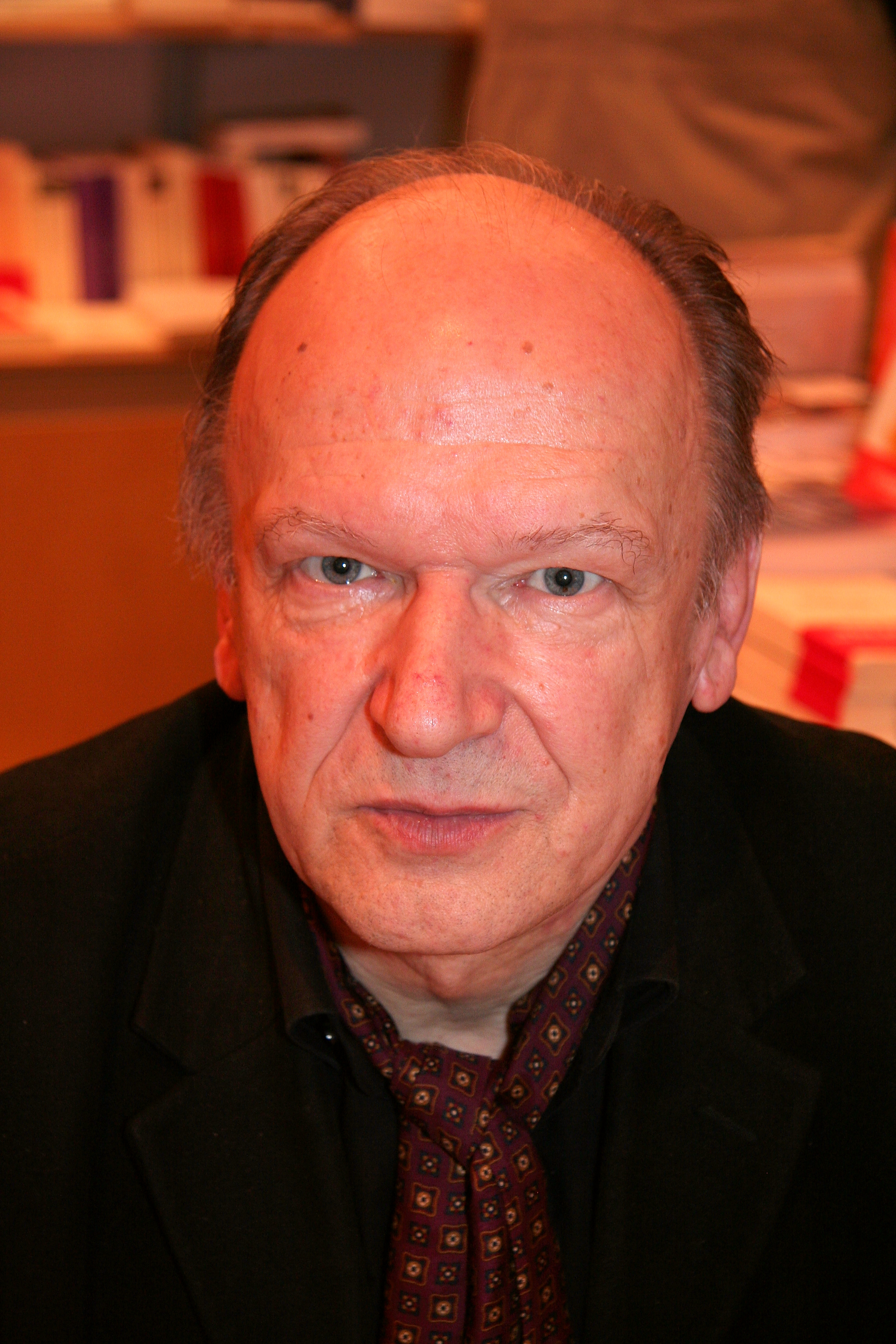
- Goffette in 2008
- Born: 18 April 1947; Gaume, Belgium
- Died: 28 March 2024 (aged 76)
- Occupations: Poet, writer

Guy Goffette (18 April 1947 – 28 March 2024) was a Belgian-born poet and writer. Goffette published his first book of poems in 1969. After then he worked as an editor at the publishing company Gallimard. Goffette's poetry has been compared to Verlaine (of whom Goffette wrote a fictional "biography") – the contemporary French poet Yves Bonnefoy remarked

Goffette is an heir to Verlaine. A poet who very courageously has decided to remain faithful to his own personal life, in its humblest moments. He keeps things simple, he is marvelously able to capture the emotions and desires common to us all. Goffette is without question one of the best poets of the present moment in France.

Goffette's short fiction (récits) often reimagine historic figures – the poet Paul Verlaine in Verlaine d'ardoise et de pluie (1995) and again in L'autre Verlaine (2007) or the painter Pierre Bonnard through his muse Marthe in Elle, par bonheur et toujours nue (published in English as Forever Nude in 2008). For several years, the American poet and critic Marilyn Hacker has translated a number of his poems, which have appeared in The Paris Review, TriQuarterly, Barrow Street, and Poetry London. A bilingual anthology of her translations of Goffette's poetry, Charlestown Blues , was published in 2007 by University of Chicago Press

In addition to his poetry and his fiction, Goffette was a prolific essayist and a critic who regularly contributed to the Nouvelle Revue Française.

Guy Goffette died on 28 March 2024, at the age of 76.

== Awards ==
- 1989 Mallarmé prize for Eloge pour une cuisine de province
- Grand Prix of the Académie Française.
- 2015 International Literary Award Novi Sad (International Novi Sad Literature Festival)

== Selected poetry ==
- Quotidien rouge, 1971.
- Nomadie, 1979.
- Huit muses neuves et nues, poems about the photographs by Miloslav Stibor, 1983.
- Solo d'ombres, 1983.
- Prologue à une maison sans murs, 1983.
- Le dormeur près du toit, 1983.
- La vie promise, 1991,(translations from the Italian "La vita promessa")
- Le pêcheur d'eau, Ed. Gallimard, Paris, 1995, coll. Blanche. Rééd. 2001.
- Icarus, (with a bilingual translation by Tucker Zimmerman, 2000.
- Solo d'ombres précédé de Nomadie, 2003.
- L'adieu aux lisières, 2007

== Selected fiction ==
- Partance, 1995.
- Verlaine d'ardoise et de pluie, 1996.
- L'ami du jars, 1997.
- Elle, par bonheur et toujours nue, 1998 published in English as Forever Nude in a translation by Frank Wynne
- Partance et autres lieux suivi de Nema problema, 2000.
- Un été autour du cou, 2001.
- Une enfance lingère, 2006.
- L'autre Verlaine, 2007.

== Notes ==
- Guy Goffette, Sincère n°66, Dampicourt, 1984
- Jaques Borel – Sur les poètes (J.Stéfan, G.Goffette), Seyssel, Champ Vallon, 1998.
- Benoît Conort – Guy Goffette : Verlaine, Le Nouveau Recueil n°40, Seyssel, Champ Vallon, 1996.
- Hédi Kaddour – Guy Goffette, Poètes français, Paris, ADPF / Ministère des Affaires étrangères, 2000.
- John TAYLOR : Guy Goffette: Exploring an Exclusive Promised Life France Magazine n°54, 2000.
