= Maja Solar =

Serbian poetress and Marxist-feminist philosopher

Maja Solar (Serbian-Cyrillic: Маја Солар; born 6 February 1980 in Zagreb, Yugoslavia) is Croatian poetress and Marxist-feminist philosopher.

== Biography ==
Maja Solar studied philosophy at Faculty of Philosophy of University of Novi Sad, Magister thesis on Darwin and Essentialism in 2008, obtained 2014 PhD thesis on Problem of ownership in Rousseau’s and Marx's philosophy, was Assistant at Department of philosophy of University, focused on Marxism of feminist theory

Solar published Cultural policy articles in Journals like Gerusija collective, and as freelance-worker for Polja, adapted Text for Serbian Le Monde diplomatique.

An edition of selected poems has been published in Hungarian (2015), in German (2011), Polish (2015) and English (2016) anthologies, and three poems in Dutch translation (2018) by Samplekanon.

== Awards ==
- Branko Award 2009.

== Bibliography (selection) ==
- Makulalalalatura (Maculalalalature; word play with maculature), poetry, Studentski kulturni centar, Kragujevac 2008, ISBN 978-86-7398-038-6.
- Jellemző, hogy nem természetes : versek (It's characteristic that it is not natural: poems), Forum, Újvidék 2015, ISBN 978-86-323-0939-5.
- Bez začina (Without Spices), poetry, Kulturni centar Novog Sada, Novi Sad 2017, ISBN 978-86-7931-570-0.
- Eintrittskarte Serbien: Panorama der Lyrik des 21. Jahrhunderts (Entrance Ticket Serbia: Panorama of the Poetry of the 21st Century), Drava, Klagenfurt 2011, ISBN 978-3-85435-643-1.
- Serce i krew : antologia nowej liryki serbskiej (Heart and Blood: Anthology of New Serbian Poetry), Wschodnia Fundacja Kultury "Akcent", Lublin 2015,
  ISBN 978-83-925993-9-5.
- Cat Painters: An Anthology of Contemporary Serbian Poetry, Lavender Ink, New Orleans 2016, ISBN 978-1-944884-08-6.
