= Alen Bešić =

Serbian writer (b. 1975)

Alen Bešić (Serbian Cyrillic: Ален Бешић; born 17 May 1975, Bihać, SFR Yugoslavia) is a Serbian literary critic, translator and poet.

== Life and work ==
Alen Bešić grew up in Vojvodina and studied Serbian language and literature at the Philosophical Faculty of the University of Novi Sad, where he graduated with Magister degree in 2006. He worked as managing coordinator of the program of the cultural institution American Corner in Novi Sad from 2005 to May 2007. He is editor-in-chief of the literary journal Polja since October 2007. Many essays and reviews by Bešić have already been published in numerous Serbian literary journals and newspapers in recent decades, and the literary critic was member of the Jury for the Isidora Sekulić Awards 2014 and 2015. Bešić is translator of works by Jean Rhys, Jamaica Kincaid, Edna Annie Proulx, Joyce Carol Oates, John Robert Fowles, Tony Hoagland, John Ralston Saul und Bruce Chatwin into Serbian, he is a member of the Association of Serbian Literary Translators and received two important Serbian awards for literary translations in 2011 and 2015. He is considered to be one of the most renowned poets of contemporary Serbian poetry, his third collection of poems Naked Heart received the Branko Miljković Award 2012 and the Montenegrin Ristko Ratković Award 2012, three of his poems from the Serbian edition Naked Heart have been published in an English anthology in 2016, some selected poems in German, French, Hungarian, Macedonian and Slovenian, and an edition of collected poems in Russian translation. Bešić was invited guest of the Committee on Cultural and Media Affairs of the German Bundestag in cooperation with the Brandenburg Gate Foundation at the Leipzig Book Fair 2011. The poet was Artist in Residence of Croatian Kamov Residency Program 2013 in Rijeka.

== Bibliography (selection) ==
- Lavirinti čitanja: kritike i ogledi o savremenom pesništvu (Labyrinths of reading: reviews and essays on contemporary poetry), Agora, Zrenjanin 2006,
  ISBN 86-84599-35-7.
- Golo srce (Naked Heart), NB „Stefan Prvovenčani“, Kraljevo 2012, ISBN 978-86-81355-32-9.
- Cat Painters: An Anthology of Contemporary Serbian Poetry, New Orleans 2016, ISBN 978-1-944884-08-6.
