= The Encyclopedia of the Dead =

1983 collection of nine stories by Danilo Kiš

- First edition (Serbian)
- Author: Danilo Kiš
- Original title: Enciklopedija mrtvih
- Translator: Michael Henry Heim
- Cover artist: Patsy Welch
- ISBN: 9780810115149
- Preceded by: Homo poeticus (1983)

The Encyclopedia of the Dead (Serbo-Croatian: Enciklopedija mrtvih) is a collection of nine stories by Yugoslav author Danilo Kiš. Combining history and fiction in what critics have seen as a postmodern fashion, the stories (which have been compared to the work of Jorge Luis Borges) have helped cement Kiš's legacy as one of the most important 20th-century Yugoslav authors.

== Background and contents ==
The Encyclopedia of the Dead, Kiš's final work, was first published in the Serbo-Croatian language in 1983. A French translation by Pascale Delpech was published by Gallimard in 1985, and received a mixed review in World Literature Today, the reviewer finding them of uneven literary quality (but the translation "excellent"). It was translated in English by Michael Henry Heim (a translation praised for its faithfulness in preserving the original "clarity and precision") and published in 1989 by Farrar, Straus and Giroux, then republished in 1997 by Northwestern UP in their European Classics series.

The stories combine fiction and history in a postmodern fashion. In a postscript, Kiš provides historical backgrounds and other information. As in his other works, in The Encyclopedia Kiš attempts to "piece together the hybrid identity of the Balkans"; his effort "is mediated through contradictory strategies (documentary, myth, imaginary projection, metafictional allusions and references) that cannot provide narrative coherences or certitudes". A Tomb for Boris Davidovich was "a cenotaph...for the hidden victims of Stalin's purges", and The Encyclopedia is an extension of that project of cataloging the victims of history "along more blatantly metaphysical lines", according to Chris Power. As in A Tomb, a predilection with missing texts is an important theme in The Encyclopedia—in A Tomb, for instance, the missing entry in the Encyclopedia of Revolutionaries for the titular character, and in An Encyclopedia the lost correspondence of Mendel Osipovich in "Red Stamps with Lenin's Picture".

== Reception and influence ==
Kiš is frequently compared to Jorge Luis Borges (he had been accused of plagiarizing Borges and James Joyce in A Tomb for Boris Davidovich, which prompted a "scathing response" in The Anatomy Lesson (1978)), and critics find this to be especially true of The Encyclopedia. According to Angela Carter's review of The Encyclopedia, however, Kiš "is more haunted, less antic than the Argentine master". The Slovenian poet Aleš Debeljak mentioned both Borges and Kiš in a 1994 essay called "The Disintegration of Yugoslavia: The Twilight of the Idols"; Debeljak, in a passage on who it was that young Yugoslav writers of the 1980s looked up to, explained that "the truly decisive role in our formation as writers wasn't Borges, as influential as he was, but Danilo Kiš", citing The Encyclopedia as one of three Kiš titles. Less positive is German poet and translator Michael Hofmann, who in a 1989 review in The Times Literary Supplement called Kiš "a highly deliberate and self-conscious author of vaguely Pyrrhic books" and finds "terrible cliches" and predictable outlines in the stories.

== Major themes in the Text ==
Major themes in the text are: death, truth, being, archiving and the role of the archivist, religion, myth, storytelling, literature, language, reckoning of the human condition, the human experience, indifference to history, illusion, surveillance, deception, the creation and questioning of an objective reality, truth verses knowledge, the cartography of knowledge, appearance verses substance, culture as a filter of truth, man's ability to distort and manipulate history, positions of power, irony, the meaning of human experience and suffering, subjectivity of morality, the history of ideas, lineage and personal histories.

== Stories ==
"Simon Magus"
A "masterly tale", with two different endings, of a counter-prophet from the 1st century AD. Magus, a reported sorcerer, is confronted by Peter (who is presented as a "tyrannical power") while preaching against Christianity and its god, and accepts a challenge to perform a miracle. In the first version, he flies into the clouds to be thrown down by God; in the second, he is buried alive and after three days his body has putrefied. Both endings confirm his prophetic qualities, in the eyes of his followers.

"Last Respects"
The death of a prostitute in Hamburg, 1923 or 1924, leads to "a miracle of revolutionary disobedience", an "elemental, irrational uprising" when her funeral is celebrated by the lower ranks of society, who pillage the flowers from all over the cemetery to place them on Marietta's grave.

"The Encyclopedia of the Dead (A Whole Life)"
A scholar spends a night in the Royal Library of Sweden where she gains access to The Encyclopedia of the Dead, a unique exemplar of a book "containing the biography of every ordinary life lived since 1789".

The encyclopedia is the expression of a sociological and political philosophy; in the words of Gabriel Motola: "The scrupulous detail is necessary to the compilers of this encyclopedia because they believe that history is less the record of cataclysmic events caused by the high and mighty, who if mentioned in any other encyclopedia are automatically omitted from this one, than it is the sum total of everyday occurrences of ordinary folk". The narrator reads the entry on her father and tries to record as much as she can. The story was published in The New Yorker, June 12, 1982.

"The Legend of the Sleepers"
A retelling (from one of the sleepers' perspectives) of the legend of the Seven Sleepers.

"The Mirror of the Unknown"
A girl foresees in a mirror, bought for her from a gypsy, how her father and sisters will be murdered.

"The Story of the Master and the Disciple"
In Prague, Ben Haas (a writer who combines art and morality, a combination otherwise thought impossible) takes on a mediocre writer as a disciple, who in turn denounces his former master.

"To Die for One's Country Is Glorious"
Young Esterházy, of a noble family, is executed for having participated in a brief uprising against the Habsburgs. His mother possibly participates in what could be a cruel scheme to assist Esterházy in keeping up appearances until the final moment. In a themed 1998 issue of the journal Rowohlt Literaturmagazin devoted to Kiš, Hungarian poet Péter Esterházy latches on to this story in his remembrance.

"The Book of Kings and Fools"
Written as an alternate biography of The Protocols of the Elders of Zion, the story is a fictional history of a book, The Conspiracy. Like The Protocols, The Conspiracy is said to be based on Maurice Joly's The Dialogue in Hell Between Machiavelli and Montesquieu. According to Svetlana Boym, the story treats conspiracy theory as an "actual historical threat" which the narrator attempts to disrupt, a tragic effort doomed to failure since the "violence persists" even after "the facts have been revealed".

The influence of this story in particular on four contemporary authors serves as evidence for Andrew Wachtel that Kiš is the most influential Yugoslav author in post-Yugoslav literature. In addition, Kiš's portrayal of Sergei Nilus formed the basis for Umberto Eco's version of the character in Foucault's Pendulum (1988).

"Red Stamps with Lenin's Picture"
A woman explains in a letter to the biographer of Yiddish poet Mendel Osipovitch that she was the poet's long-time lover. In her account, she provides biographical detail and chastises his critics for their exaggerated and all-too literary interpretations ("lazy layers of psychoanalytic criticism", according to a reviewer in The American).
