= Psalm 44 (novel) =

Novel by Serbian author Danilo Kiš

Psalm 44 is a novel by Yugoslav author Danilo Kiš. The novel was written (in Serbian) in 1960 and published in 1962, along with his novel The Attic, and tells the story of the last few hours of a woman and her child in a Nazi concentration camp, before they escape. In a narrative full of flashbacks and stream-of-consciousness passages, with elements derived from his own life, Kiš sketches the life of a Jewish woman who witnesses the Novi Sad raid, is deported to a Nazi camp where she gives birth to a boy, and escapes with the help of another woman. Months after the war's end she is reunited with her lover, a Jewish doctor who had assisted the Nazis in Joseph Mengele-style experiments.

== Plot ==
Marija is the young mother of two-month-old Jan, and has been planning to escape from Auschwitz. Her friend Žana and the mysterious Maks have laid the groundwork for the escape, which is to take place as Allied troops are approaching, the sound of their distant artillery forming a constant background to the activities in the camp. Next to Marija in her bunk bed is Polja, who is succumbing to disease and will not survive the night. Marija dries her son's diapers, made from cotton rags, on her own legs, and ponders at which point Polja is far enough gone for her to start tearing up Polja's sheet to make diapers and sanitary napkins.

The escape is to take place at 2:30 AM, and while they wait and try to sleep, Marija thinks back on her early and immediate past. Early in the book those are recollections of her immediate past in the camp. She had managed to tell Jakob, her lover, that she was pregnant, and later that she delivered a boy. In another recollection she thinks back on the evening spent in a closet hiding from Dr. Nietzsche: Jakob is a Jewish doctor who is surviving in the camp because he assists Nietzsche in his medical experiments on Jews, experiments involving sterilization, infection, and amputation. One evening, during a clandestine visit to Jakob, Nietzsche comes by and Marija is pushed into a closet, where she nearly passes out, but manages to hear Nietzsche explain to Jakob that the latter is to save the results of Nietzsche's experiments, especially his collection of Jewish skulls. As Marija listens, Jakob navigates between his disgust for Nietzsche and his need to collaborate in order to survive. After Nietzsche leaves, Marija leaves too but too noisily; as the guards run down the corridor she is pulled into a room and saved by Maks, whom she never sees but who has acquired mythical proportions.

Later recollections occur as Polja is practically dead and Žana is urging Marija to rest as much as possible. These involve an early run-in with antisemitism: fourteen-year-old Marija, who grew up in the Vojvodina, was sent to the country to escape the persecution of Jews only to hear from a girl her age that she and her ancestors are guilty of killing Christ. She hastens home to her parents; her drunk father explains to her what is happening to the area's Jewish population, a truth she is not prepared to hear but then accepts. Soon her parents are deported, and Marija witnesses the atrocity of the Novi Sad raid, in which Hungarian troops killed between 3,000 and 4,000 civilians, in January 1942. She herself is hauled off to a camp soon afterward, where she meets Jakob.

Žana, Marija, and Jan escape when the electricity to the barracks is cut off by Maks. They make their way through a hole in the floor to the fence, and crawl underneath. As they do so, Jan starts crying and German guards catch on, but thinking that they are women from the area looking to steal the camp's supplies they do not pursue them. Marija had agreed with Jakob to escape to Poland, while Žana wants to go to Strasbourg; when they go their separate ways it is clear that Žana is in poor condition, near death. That evening Marija knocks on the door of a German woman, some five hundred kilometers from Berlin, and is taken in by Mrs. Schmidt, the wife of a German officer who has been missing for four years. Schmidt blames the Jews for everything, and Marija is forced to pretend to be a Christian woman whose officer husband is on the Eastern Front. She lives with Schmidt for months, writing letters to find Jakob.

Jakob has been convalescing in a hospital, but has lost all desire to live. A Dr. Leo procures a passport for him, and Jakob plans to travel to Canada, to leave Europe as far behind as possible. He makes one friend, a young boy named Danijel whose leg has been amputated in the very experiments Jakob participated in. On the day his passport arrives, he finally receives one of Marija's letters. In the epilogue, six years later, Marija, Jakob, and Jan travel back to the camp to show Jan where he was born. They visit when groups of tourists from Germany and the US are touring the camp, each group desecrating the memory of the dead and the survivors in their own ways.

== Background ==
Kiš wrote the story as an entry in a competition organized by a Jewish cultural organization in Belgrade. He based it on a newspaper report he had read, about a couple who survived the war and went back to visit the camp where they had been held. The book was not published until two years later, by Globus in Zagreb.

Kiš, who was born in 1935, was only 25 when he wrote Psalm 44, but his background prepared him well for such a work. His father, a Hungarian Jew from the Vojvodina, disappeared in Auschwitz; he and his mother survived the war in Hungary: these are also the subject matter of his 1972 novel Hourglass. In later interviews he distanced himself somewhat from the novel, saying it was too direct; the book's English translator John K. Cox suggests this may be in reference to his very prominent deus ex machina (the Maks character) or the "heavy-handed recasting of Mengele as 'Dr. Nietzsche'". The "heavy-handedness" of the Mengele character and other aspects of the book, including "purple outpourings of emotion", is noted also by Sam Sacks of the Wall Street Journal. Sacks compliments the translation by Cox, and praises the book as a whole: "the material in "Psalm 44" is inherently powerful, and some of Kiš's writing, especially that describing the knife-edge escape, is quite fine".
