= The Lute and the Scars =

First edition (Serbian)

The Lute and the Scars is a collection of stories by Yugoslav author Danilo Kiš. First published posthumously in 1994 (Kiš died in 1989), the stories were translated into English by John K. Cox and published in 2012. Leo Robson, book critic for The Guardian, praised the translation and called the collection "a more or less perfect book".

The stories in The Lute and the Scars were left out of the original collection that made up The Encyclopedia of the Dead (1983).

== Stories ==
- "The Poet": a man who wrote some verses critical of Tito is thrown in jail and forced to write poetry praising the dictator.
- "The Debt": the final moments of a dying poet (modeled on Bosnian author Ivo Andrić), during which he thanks those who have been kind to him, including "the unknown guard at the prison in Maribor, who pushed a scrap of paper and a tiny pencil under my door when writing meant survival for me."
- "The Lute and the Scars": an old man from Belgrade speaks of life and art, delivering, according to Sam Sacks, what could be Kiš's own esthetic judgment: "The writer has to point out the great theme, dying—so that humans might be less proud, less selfish, less evil—and on the other hand, he or she must imbue life with some kind of meaning. Art is the balance between those two contradictory concepts".
- "A and B": two places, a "magical place" and a mud house are contrasted.
- "Jurij Golec": "a beautifully worked story of regret and suicide steeped in details of the émigré writer's lifestyle".
- "The Stateless One": on "the relationship between imagination and suffering".
