= Sándor Képíró =

Hungarian war criminal

Dr. iur. Sándor Képíró
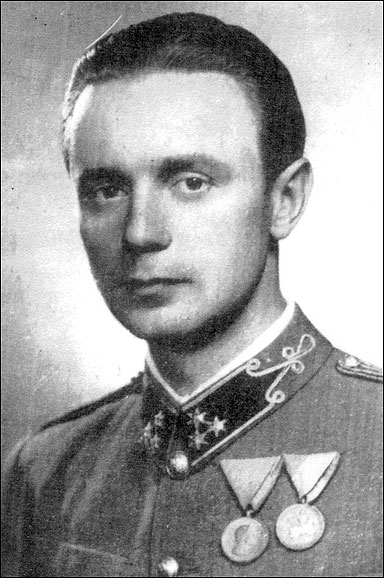
- Sándor Képíró in a gendarmerie uniform
- Born: 18 February 1914; Sarkad, Austria-Hungary
- Died: 3 September 2011 (aged 97); Budapest, Hungary
- Resting place: Sarkad, Hungary; 46°44′44.12″N 21°23′52.31″E
- Occupation: Gendarmerie captain
- Criminal charge: Crimes committed against civilians during the Novi Sad Raid
- Criminal status: Found not guilty

Sándor Képíró (18 February 1914 – 3 September 2011) was a Hungarian gendarmerie captain during World War II accused of war crimes committed by Hungarian forces.

== Wartime career ==
A police officer in the Hungarian gendarmerie, by 1942 Képíró was serving in the region of Bácska (Bačka) (today divided between Hungary and Serbia), which had been transferred to Hungary as a result of the Axis invasion and partition of Yugoslavia. In January 1942 raids were conducted in several parts in the region, including Novi Sad, and an estimated 3,000 to 4,000 civilians, mostly Serbs and Jews, were rounded up and killed. Képíró took part in this rounding up and later admitted playing that part in the affair. In 1944 he was put on trial, with fourteen other Hungarian army and police officers, accused of taking part in the raids. The court found that he had been implicated in the round-up, but he was not severely punished.

== Later events ==
In 1948, the post-war Communist authorities in Hungary took Képíró's case back to court in his absence, relying on the evidence of a man called János Nagy, who claimed to have been a member of Képíró's platoon in 1942. Képíró later claimed that he had never heard of Nagy, but was found guilty and sentenced in his absence to fourteen years' imprisonment. It was later found that the testimony of Nagy had been obtained under torture by the communist secret service.

Képíró stayed away from Budapest until 1996, when after the fall of the communist government he quietly returned home and was not identified with the man convicted in 1948.

== Final allegations and trial ==
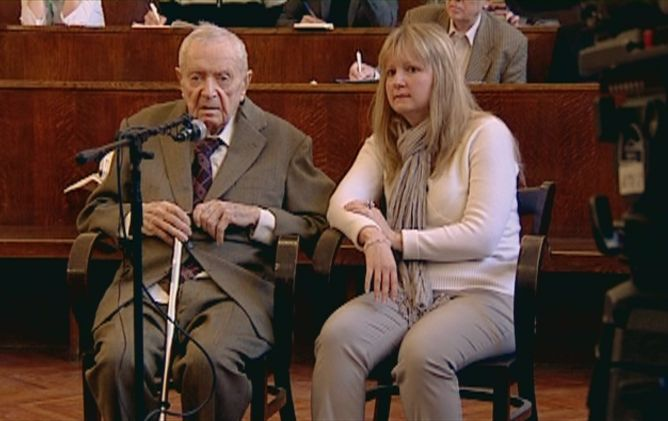
Képíró at his criminal trial, Budapest.

In September 2006, Efraim Zuroff of the Simon Wiesenthal Center identified Képíró and publicly accused him of war crimes, relying on the court verdicts from the 1940s. Responding to the accusations, Képíró said that he had been a junior police officer at the time and that he had been involved in the round up of civilians, but had taken no active part in the executions, which were carried out by soldiers. Képíró also said he had been unwilling to take part in anything unlawful. He commented "I was the only one who asked for a written command. At the time of the massacre I was reluctant. Prove that I was a war criminal." The 1944 verdict provided by the Wiesenthal Center, however, stated that despite Képíró's request for written orders, he had participated in the massacre, even though no written orders were given.

Hungarian military prosecutors stated that the verdicts were no longer valid and that a new investigation would need to be reopened, which might take years. On 14 September 2009, Képíró was taken in for questioning by the Hungarian police. However, the charges made against him were later abandoned, due to lack of evidence.

In 2007 Képíró accused Efraim Zuroff of libel and initiated criminal proceedings against him in a Budapest court. The trial opened in October 2010, but was dismissed two months later on the basis of the verdict of the wartime court in 1944. and because of Képíró's failure to appear in court.

On 14 February 2011, Hungarian prosecutors formally charged Képíró with war crimes. The case came to trial on 18 July 2011, when he was found not guilty by a Budapest court. After the not guilty verdict, László Karsai, the leading Hungarian Holocaust historian and son of a Holocaust survivor, said: "Honestly, I wish Zuroff would stop doing what he's doing. I mean: with this kind of methods he uses, with so little evidence, he tries to drag people through the mire. This can't be done to anyone, can't be done even to a former gendarmerie officer either.” Karsai accused Zuroff of being a hysterical, narcissistic Nazi hunter, working only to earn a good living, and claimed that the Wiesenthal Center made such publicity about the case in order to justify its own existence before its sponsors.

Képíró died in a hospital in Budapest at the age of 97. His death was reported by his family, and his lawyer, who said he believed the trial in the summer had contributed to his client's poor health. Zuroff said on his Facebook page, "our only consolation is that the trial has negatively affected Képíró's health."

Until 2011, Képíró was on the Simon Wiesenthal Center's list of most wanted Nazi war criminals.
