= International Novi Sad Literature Festival =

The International Novi Sad Literature Festival (Serbian: Međunarodni književni festival) is a literary festival held annually in the city of Novi Sad, Serbia. It was founded by the Association of Writers of Vojvodina in 2006. It is held еvery year in August and September.

The festival features contemporary poets, novelist and critics, who represent and promote contemporary literature from various countries. The Festival includes readings, performances, exhibitions and music. More than 900 writers from Serbia and abroad participated in the first thirteen festivals. The works of participants of the Festival are published in literary journal Zlatna greda. The winning author of the International Novi Sad Literature festival is awarded by having their winning book published in Serbian.

== Events ==
The programme of the Festival includes afternoon and evening readings and discussions in various venues throughout the city (libraries, clubs, cafès, squares), as well as other towns in Serbia. The readings represent national literatures, groups of authors or single authors.

Main events are:

- The evening reading on Trg mladenaca in the city centre, in front of the Poetry Gate
- A symposium which is held each year to discuss important contemporary literary themes
- A poetry slam
- Two awarding ceremonies:
  - Branko’s Award Ceremony at Sremski Karlovci
  - International Literary Award Of Novi Sad Ceremony on Trg mladenaca
- Daily picnics in which participants may take a boat ride on the Danube from Novi Sad to Sremski Karlovci and visit monasteries on Fruska Gora.

== Participants on Festival ==
=== International participants ===
Author	Country
Ben Okri	Nigeria
John Hartley Williams	England
Matthew Sweeney	Ireland
Andrey Kurkov	Ukraine
Tone Hødnebø	Norway
Dieter M. Gräf	Germany
Christian Teissl	Austria
Philip Tew	England
Matt Thorne	England
Tibor Fischer	England
Maja Dlgačeva	Bulgaria
Søren Ulrik Thomsen	Denmark
Jens-Martin Eriksen	Denmark
Tatjana Ščerbina	Russia
Robert Minhinnick	Wales
Stephen Rodefer	USA
Elena Fanailova	Russia
Vicent Berenguer	Spain
Milan Richter	Slovakia
Vsevolod Emelin	Russia
Peter Racz	Hungary
Dan Coman	Romania
Gabor G Gyukics	Hungary
W. N. Herbert	England
Ide Hintze	Austria
Øyvind Berg	Norway
Claudiu Komartin	Romania
Nicholas Blincoe	England
Ayten Mutlu	Turkey
Grisha Trifonov	Bulgaria
Jean Portante	France
Denis Balin	Russia

=== Serbian authors ===
* Vladimir Tasić	* Marko Vidojković	* Vićazoslav Hronjec
* Miro Vuksanović	* Dragan Jovanović Danilov	* Oto Tolnai
* Goran Petrović	* Nina Živančević	* Slavko Almažan
* Zivlak Jovan	* Đorđo Sladoje	* Kornelija Farago
* Vida Ognjenović	* Milan Nenadić	* Janoš Banjai
* Danilo Nikolić	* Dragan Dragojlović	* Alpar Lošonc
* Mileta Prodanović	* Zoran Đerić	* Dušan Pajin
* Jovica Aćin	* Ivan Negrišorac	* Aleksandar Jerkov
* Igor Marojević	* Zlatko Krasni	* Mladen Vesković
* Milica Mićić Dimovska	* Ranko Risojević	* Vladimir Gvozden
* Franja Petrinović	* Radomir D. Mitrić	* Novica Milić

== Awards ==
=== Branko’s Award ===
During the Festival, a ceremony of awarding "Branko’s Award" (Serbian: Brankova nagrada) to the Young Serbian poet of the Year is held in Sremski Karlovci.

=== The most important Branko Award’s Laureates ===
- Vasko Popa
- Aleksandar Tišma
- Borislav Radović
- Rajko Petrov Nogo
- Raša Livada
- Mile Stojić
- Branko Maleš
- Nina Živančević
- Dragan Jovanović Danilov
- Ana Ristović
- Radomir D. Mitrić

=== International Literary Award Novi Sad ===
Every year, The International Literary Award of Novi Sad is given to a world-renowned living poet for his poetic oeuvre or life achievement in the field of poetry.

Previous laureates include:

- Christoph Meckel
- Jean Pierre Faye
- Ben Okri
- Guy Goffette
