= Novi Sad raid =

World War II war crimes in Yugoslavia

Novi Sad Raid
- Part of World War II in Yugoslavia
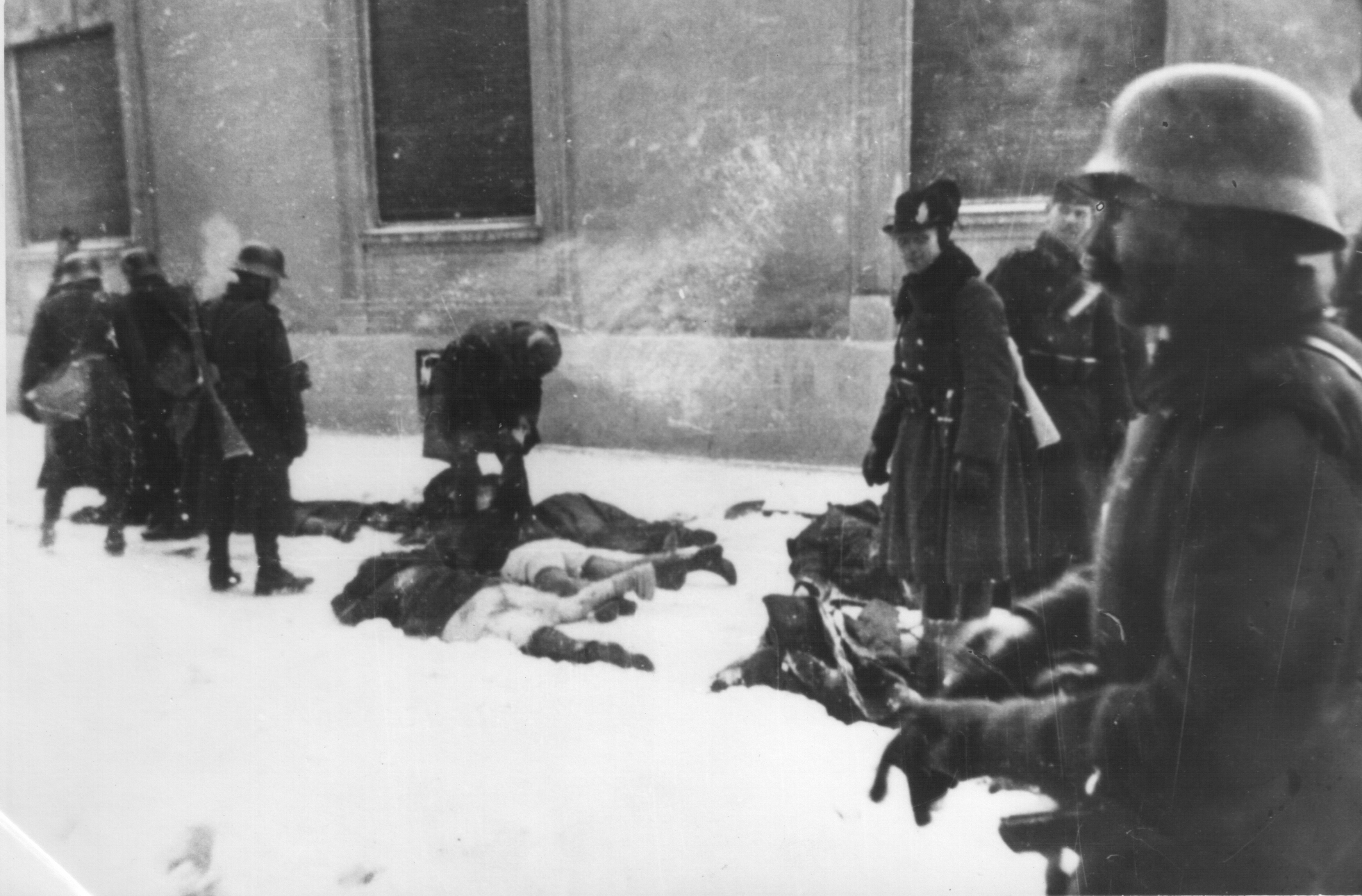
- Corpses of killed civilians in the barracks in Novi Sad, Futoška Street, January 1942.
- Location: Southern Bačka, Hungarian-occupied Yugoslavia
- Date: 4–29 January 1942
- Target: Predominantly Serb and Jewish civilians
- Attack type: Mass murder, mass shooting, summary executions
- Deaths: 3,000–4,000
- Perpetrator: Royal Hungarian Army
- Motive: Serbophobia, Antisemitism, Anti-Slavic sentiment (particularly directed against South Slavic populations)

The Novi Sad raid (Serbian: Рација у јужној Бачкој, romanized: Racija u južnoj Bačkoj; also known as the Raid in southern Bačka, the Novi Sad massacre, the Újvidék massacre, or simply The Raid; Рација, Racija) was a massacre carried out by the Royal Hungarian Army, the armed forces of the Kingdom of Hungary, during World War II, after the Hungarian occupation of Yugoslav territories and the annexation of the Kingdom of Yugoslavia. It resulted in the deaths of 3,000–4,000 civilians in Novi Sad and surrounding towns in the southern Bačka (Bácska) region.

The Hungarian occupational authorities began raiding towns and villages in southern Bačka as early as 4 January 1942, ostensibly as a means of suppressing Partisan resistance, though the historical record shows that the government of Hungary was attempting to improve its geopolitical standing vis-à-vis Germany. The first town to be raided was Čurug, followed by Gospođinci, Titel, Temerin, Đurđevo and Žabalj. The victims were seemingly detained at random while conducting everyday activities. On 20 January, the city of Novi Sad (Hungarian: Újvidék) was surrounded and placed on curfew; its telephone lines were cut. Over the next several days, the occupational authorities went about arresting "suspicious" individuals. More than 1,000 of the city's residents were killed by the time the raid ended. The victims in both Novi Sad and the wider region were mostly Serbs and Jews, though several Romani, Rusyns, Russians and Hungarians were killed as well. In Novi Sad, victims were forced to march across the frozen Danube, only to perish when the ice sheet was shattered by artillery rounds fired from the shore. Some were pushed into holes in the ice sheet, causing them to drown or succumb to hypothermia, while others were shot in the street.

The Hungarian government and news media condemned the raid, calling for an immediate investigation. In 1943, the Hungarians conducted a mass trial of those suspected of organizing the raid, handing down prison terms ranging from 10 to 15 years. The convicts escaped to Germany. After the war, several trials were held in Hungary and Yugoslavia, resulting in the conviction and execution of a number of key organizers. The final court proceedings relating to the raid took place in 2011, when Sándor Képíró was tried and acquitted of murdering over 30 civilians in Novi Sad.

The raid has been fictionalized in literature and film in both Serbia and Hungary. The killings continue to strain relations between the two countries. In June 2013, Hungarian President János Áder formally apologized for the war crimes that the Hungarian military had committed against Serbian civilians during the war.

== Background ==
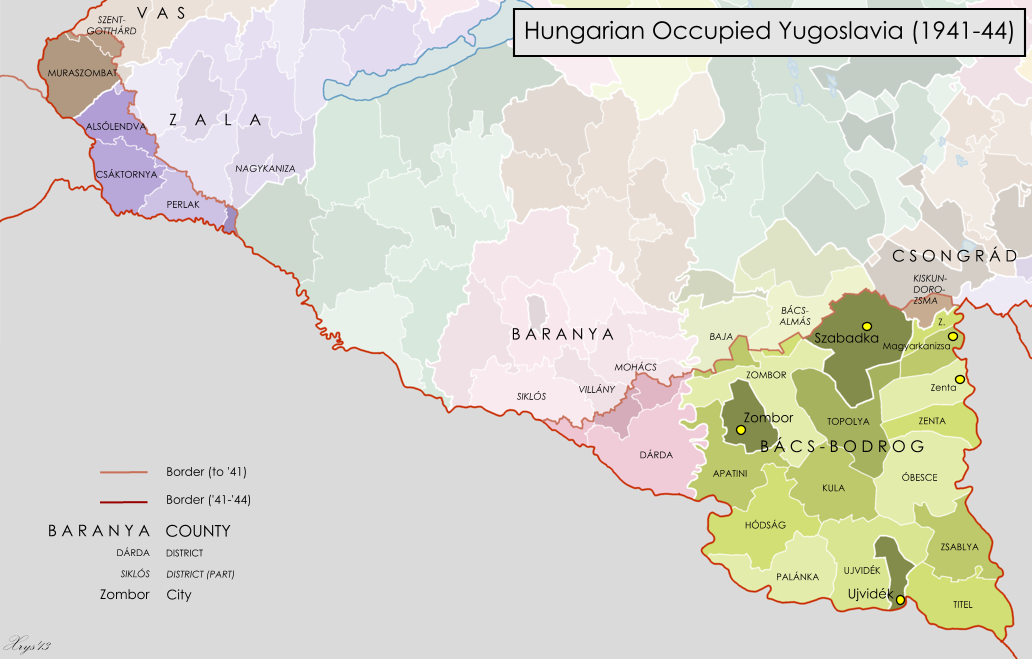
Map of the Hungarian occupied and annexed areas of Yugoslavia; Bačka (Bácska) is shown in green.

Germany, Italy and Hungary invaded Yugoslavia on 6 April 1941, in response to a coup d'état that deposed the country's regent, Paul, and hastened the ascent of his underage cousin, Peter to the throne. The country was overrun in less than two weeks, occupied and partitioned among its neighbours. The area that constitutes the present-day province of Vojvodina, in northern Serbia, was divided between Germany, Hungary and the Axis puppet state known as the Independent State of Croatia (Croatian: Nezavisna Država Hrvatska; NDH), which was established shortly after the invasion. The Germans assumed direct control of the Banat, which became an autonomous district of the German-occupied territory of Serbia, primarily to satisfy the demands of the region's sizeable ethnic German (Volksdeutsche) population. The Croatians occupied Syrmia and incorporated it into the NDH, stopping just short of Belgrade. The Hungarians occupied Bačka, which had been a part of Hungary until the Treaty of Trianon of 1920, when it was incorporated into the newly formed Kingdom of Serbs, Croats and Slovenes (later Yugoslavia). A large number of Hungarians and ethnic Germans had remained in the areas despite the cession. Hungarian-occupied Bačka consisted of that part of the former Danube Banovina once bounded by the Hungarian–Yugoslav border to the north, the Danube to the south and west, and the Tisza to the east. The total area of Hungarian-occupied Bačka was 8,558 km^{2} (3,304 mi^{2}).

The Hungarian occupational authorities resolved to "rebalance" the ethnic makeup of Bačka while the invasion was still underway. Within days of the invasion, Serb and Jewish homes were attacked and looted. On 14 April 1941, as many as 500 Serbs and Jews were killed, likely in accordance with previously assembled lists of people marked for death. Legislation was soon passed requiring that all non-Hungarians and non-Germans who had moved to the area after 1918 be deported. (Note: Between 1918 and 1924, nearly 45,000 Hungarians had been deported to Hungary from the territories transferred to the Kingdom of Serbs, Croats and Slovenes, and more than 10,000 South Slavic military settlers (Serbo-Croatian: Solunski dobrovoljci, lit. Salonika volunteers), mainly Serbs, were settled in the region.) The Hungarian occupational authorities expelled between 25,000 and 60,000 Serbs from Bačka, both colonists from the interwar period, as well as pre-World War I inhabitants. They were first interned in concentration camps before being deported to the German-occupied territory of Serbia. The Hungarians originally intended to expel as many as 150,000, but this plan was opposed by the German command in Belgrade, and subsequently fell through. More than 15,000 Hungarian colonists later settled the area, moving into the homes of the Serbs that were forced out.

A policy of "systematic magyarization" was implemented within the occupied territories. "Less-desirable elements" of the population, such as Serbs, Croats and Jews, were discriminated against in matters of communication and education. Hungarian and German were the only languages permitted in almost all secondary schools, and Serbo-Croatian books, newspapers and periodicals were virtually banned. Despite this, most Serbs and Croats that had lived in the Hungarian-occupied territories prior to 1918 retained their citizenship rights as Hungarians, and some lower-level non-Hungarian public employees retained their jobs. On 14 December 1941, Bačka, along with the other Hungarian-occupied areas of Yugoslavia, referred to by Hungary as the "Recovered Southern Territories" (Hungarian: Délvidék), were officially annexed and formally incorporated into Hungary.

== Prelude ==
=== Initial resistance ===
Small-scale armed resistance broke out in Bačka in the second half of 1941 and the Hungarian military reacted with heavy repressive measures. More than 300 prisoners were executed in September 1941 alone. Thousands of Serbs and Jews were detained in concentration camps that had been established in Ada, Bačka Topola, Begeč, Odžaci, Bečej, Subotica and Novi Sad, as well as at Pécs and Baja, in Hungary-proper. The communist-led Partisan resistance movement of Josip Broz Tito was never strong in Bačka because the region's flat terrain did not lend itself to guerilla warfare, and because South Slavs, from whom the Partisans drew most of their recruits, made up only one third of the regional population. By the end of 1941, the Partisans of Bačka had largely been destroyed, as had their regional committee. The Chetniks, Serbian nationalist irregulars seeking to reinstate the Yugoslav monarchy, offered sporadic resistance during the invasion, but were largely inactive for much of the occupation, maintaining some covert activity only.

Before the war, Bačka had been home to around 15,000 Jews. This constituted more than one-fifth of Yugoslavia's pre-war Jewish population. Moreover, more than 90 percent of the Jews living in the Hungarian-occupied territories of Yugoslavia hailed from the region. The Hungarian government had passed anti-Semitic laws in 1939, and following the outbreak of the war, these were applied in the occupied and annexed territories. After the violence of the initial occupation, no further massacres of Jews occurred in Bačka for the remainder of 1941, though the Jewish community was subjected to a string of discriminatory measures, such as the confiscation of property, arbitrary detention and forced labour.

=== Escalation ===
By early 1942, the Hungarian military estimated that there were no more than 110 Partisans operating in all of Vojvodina, though in reality, the true figure was closer to 40. On 4 January 1942, several dozen Partisans from the Šajkaška Partisan detachment were found hiding at a farm near Žabalj. They were engaged by the Hungary military, and in the ensuing clash, 10 Hungarian soldiers and seven Partisans were killed. The remaining Partisans were arrested and deported to German-occupied Serbia. The Hungarian General Staff seized on the incident, using it as a pretext for launching attacks throughout the region that were intended to deter non-Hungarians from joining the resistance.

On 5 January, Ferenc Szombathelyi, the Chief of the Hungarian General Staff, ordered punitive raids against the Partisans of Bačka. The order coincided with German Foreign Minister Joachim von Ribbentrop's visit to Budapest on 6 January. Several days later, Generalfeldmarschall (Field marshal) Wilhelm Keitel, the chief of the Supreme Command of the Armed Forces, arrived in Budapest requesting that the entire Royal Hungarian Army be moved to the Eastern Front. Hungarian Prime Minister László Bárdossy declined, and in order to justify this decision, sought to demonstrate that Hungarian troops were desperately needed in the occupied territories. The Hungarian General Staff requested that the occupational authorities provide proof of an imminent, large-scale Partisan revolt in Bačka to show the Germans. Hungary's leaders may also have been motivated to pursue a harsh response to demonstrate that they were strong enough to deal with Serb resistance and Jewish "subversion", and thus convince Germany that Hungary was competent enough to control the Banat, which had been part of the country before World War I. According to the Holocaust scholar Mark Levene, the raid "may well have been intended as a dread signal from Budapest that Hungarian rule over non-Hungarians in the Balkans ... would be every bit as brutal as that of ... other occupying powers, or, for that matter, as it had previously been in Hungarian-occupied Serbia during the Great War." Accordingly, further guerrilla attacks were orchestrated by the occupational authorities in order to magnify the size of the Partisan resistance. Bandages were distributed to gendarmes, and they were instructed to wear them on their heads and hands to simulate the effects of being wounded. These events were staged primarily for public consumption.

== Timeline ==
=== Killings commence ===
More than 8,000 Hungarian soldiers, gendarmes and border guards participated in the raid. It began in the town of Čurug on 6 January, with suspected Partisans, including women and children, being removed to barns, storage buildings, and municipal buildings. Although some suspects were released, between 500 and 1,000 people were killed and their bodies stripped of all valuables. The raid moved onto other local settlements such as Gospođinci and Titel the same day and continued the day after. Over the next three days, additional killings took place in the towns of Temerin and Žabalj. Civilians were rounded up at random and taken from their homes and businesses during their workday and while they were engaged in regular activities, even weddings.

=== Novi Sad massacre ===
On 20 January, Novi Sad was completely surrounded and placed on curfew. Its telephone and telegraph lines were cut. The city was divided into multiple areas of responsibility, with a different officer tasked with organizing the round-ups in each. Placards sprang up on buildings, warning citizens against going outdoors, except to buy food. Ferenc Feketehalmy-Czeydner summoned the local authorities and announced that the Royal Hungary Army would "take charge and clean things up" over the next three days. The raid began the following day. Between 6,000 and 7,000 people that were considered "suspicious" were arrested and taken to have their papers examined. Others were detained on account that they had no papers. Most were released, but at least 40 were taken to the banks of the Danube and shot.

"The massacre was conducted systematically," the historian Leni Yahil writes, "street by street." Many of the soldiers were visibly intoxicated. Survivor accounts, delivered after the war, attest to the brutality of the killings. A woman recalled how, on 23 April, a soldier entered her apartment, demanding to know her family's religious affiliation. The woman told him that she and her family were Orthodox Christians. Infuriated, the soldier called her a "stinking Serb" and killed her five sons. Thousands of men, women and children were imprisoned and interrogated at the Sokolski Dom, one of the city's main cultural centres. Many died during their interrogation.

Temperatures reached −29 °C (−20 °F). Victims were brought to an area known as the Štrand, along the Danube, and shot with machine guns. Their killers then broke up the frozen river's ice sheets with artillery fire and tossed the bodies into the water. According to another account, the victims were forced to tread the ice sheets, which were then shattered by shelling from the shore, causing them to fall into the freezing water and drown. The killings only ceased after four days, when the city's Lord Lieutenant, László Deák, bypassed the curfew and alerted the authorities in Budapest. He returned with orders that the massacre was to come to an immediate halt. Feketehalmy-Czeydner ordered that all executions be stopped by 9:00 p.m. Deák's mother was among the victims. "The randomness and senselessness of the operation were evident especially by the fact that it hit not one single functionary of the Yugoslav Communist Party," the historian Krisztián Ungváry writes.

== Aftermath ==
In Stari Bečej, the occupational authorities staged another "rebellion" and followed it up with further mass arrests. Around 200 people were detained and taken to the banks of the Tisza, where they were shot and their bodies thrown into the river. When the ice thawed, the corpses of those killed in the raid floated down the Danube and the Tisza. The Hungarian news media denounced the raid as unparalleled in the country's military history. The Hungarian government also condemned the killings, vowing that the perpetrators would be brought to justice.

=== Casualties ===
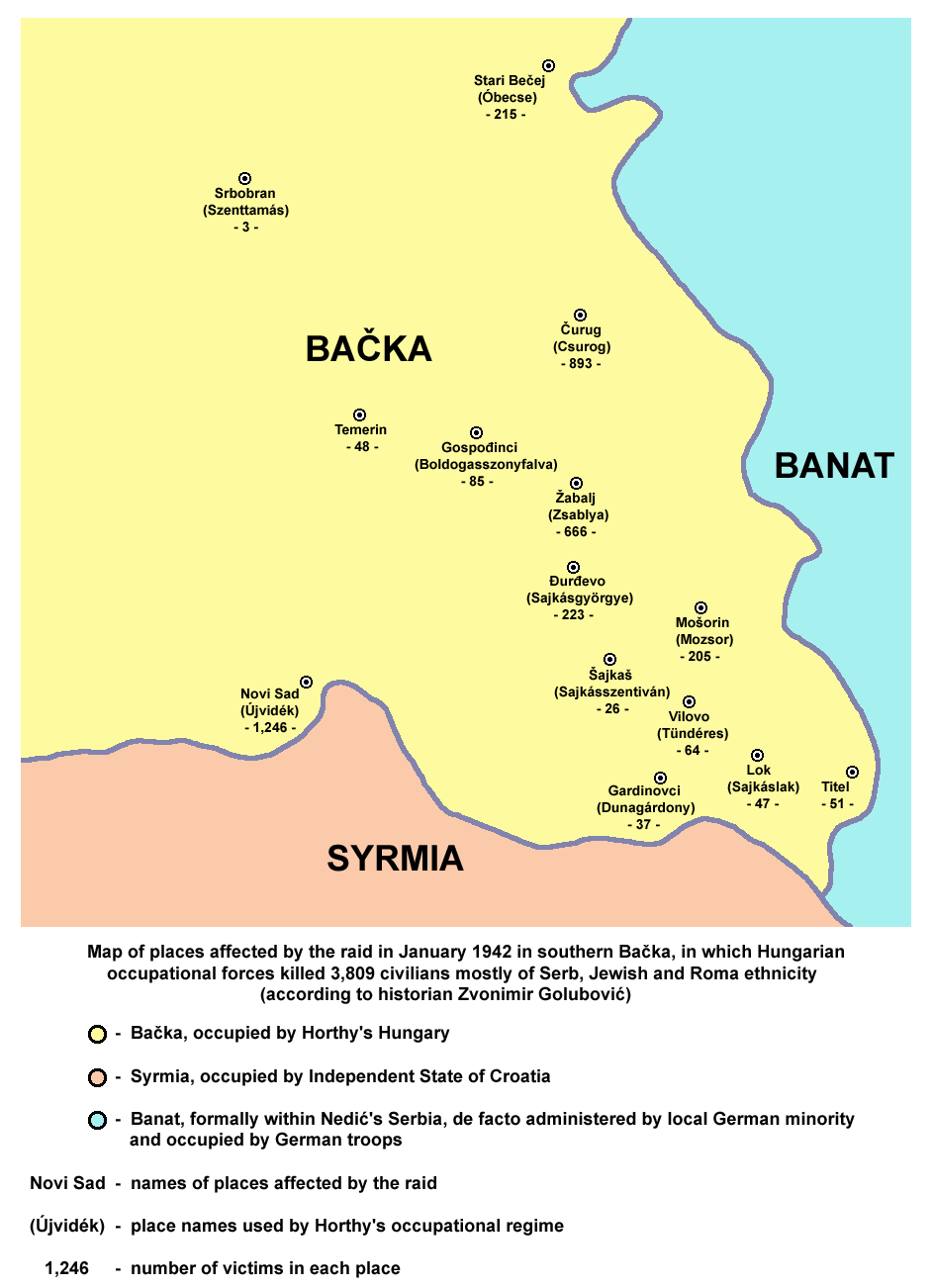
Map of places affected by the raid

In a contemporary correspondence, Hungary's Minister of the Interior, Ferenc Keresztes-Fischer, wrote that 3,755 people lost their lives in the raid. The historian Rudolph Rummel places the number of deaths resulting from the raid at 3,200. The Holocaust scholar Leni Yahil writes that 4,116 individuals were killed – 2,842 Serbs, 1,250 Jews, 13 Russians and 11 Hungarians. The historian Zvonimir Golubović places the total number of civilians killed in the raid at 3,809. This figure is accepted by the Holocaust scholar Yehuda Bauer. The following table, composed by Golubović, lists the victims according to their gender, ethnicity and the place that they were killed:

Place	Total	Men	Women	Children	Elderly	Serbs	Jews	Romani	Rusyns	Hungarians	Russians
Bečej	215	111	72	13	19	102	110	-	-	-	-
Vilovo	64	44	6	8	6	64	-	-	-	-	-
Gardinovci	37	32	3	-	2	37	-	-	-	-	-
Gospođinci	85	47	19	15	4	73	10	-	2	-	-
Đurđevo	223	107	60	41	15	173	22	-	27	-	-
Žabalj	666	355	141	101	69	614	28	23	-	1	-
Lok	47	46	-	-	1	46	-	-	-	1	-
Mošorin	205	94	41	44	26	170	-	34	-	1	-
Novi Sad	1,246	489	415	165	177	375	809	-	2	18	15
Srbobran	3	3	-	-	-	2	2	-	-	-	-
Temerin	48	14	15	7	12	6	42	-	-	-	-
Titel	51	45	-	1	5	49	1	-	-	-	-
Čurug	893	554	153	82	104	842	44	7	-	-	-
Šajkaš	26	24	2	-	-	25	1	-	-	-	-
All places	3,809	1,965	927	477	440	2,578	1,068	64	31	21	15

=== Legal proceedings ===
In 1943, Regent of Hungary Miklós Horthy ordered an investigation into the massacres and charges were brought against some of those that had conducted them. Those charged fled to Nazi Germany and returned only after German forces occupied Hungary in 1944. Horthy used the investigation as a method of distinguishing his regime from that of Nazi Germany.

Some Serbian historians, such as Golubović and Aleksandar Veljić, have claimed that Horthy himself was aware of the raids and approved them being carried out. Horthy was a witness at the Nuremberg Trials after World War II but, despite strong demands from Yugoslavia, the Americans and the Soviets favored dropping any charges.

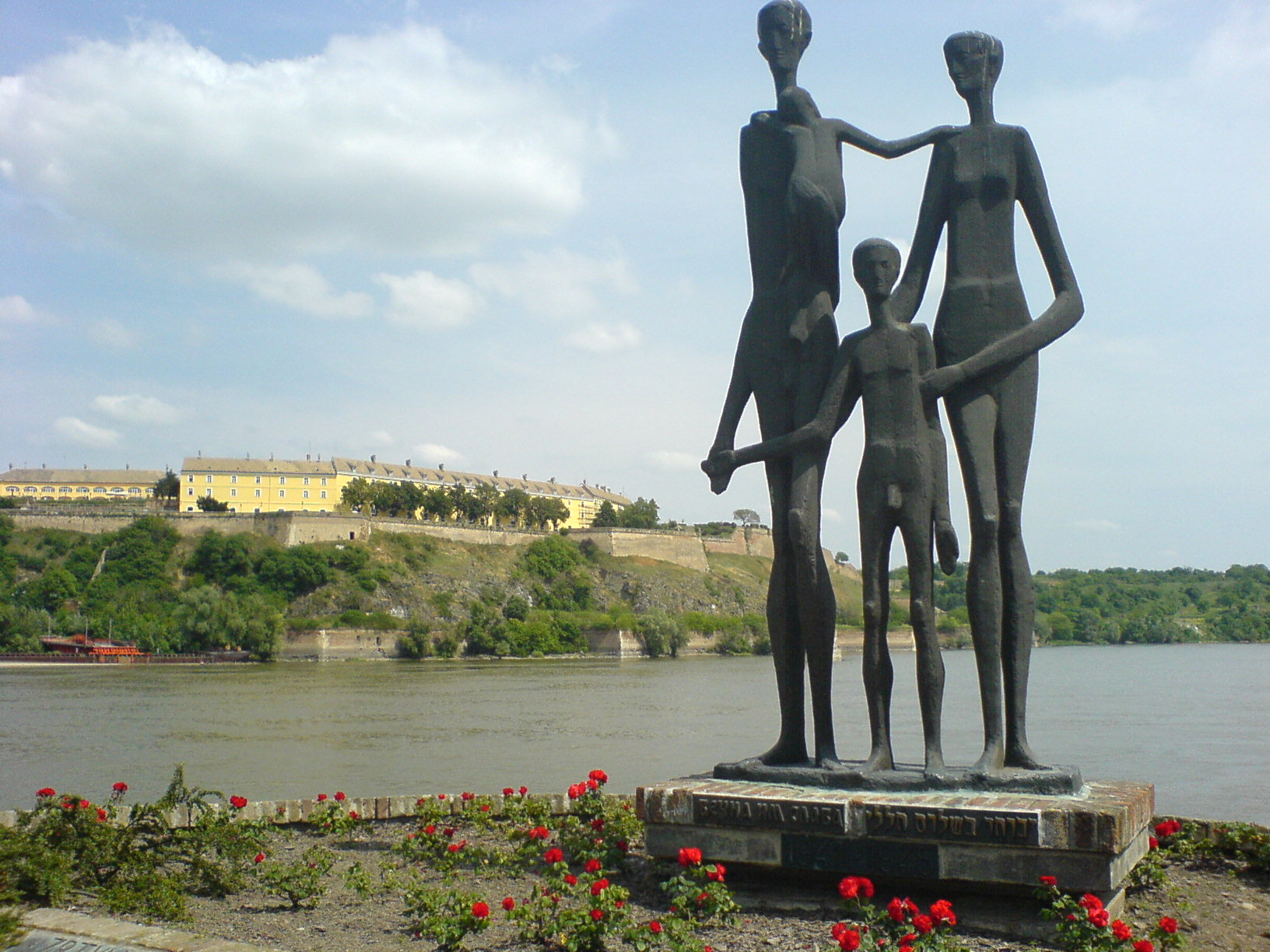
The monument to the victims of the raid in Novi Sad

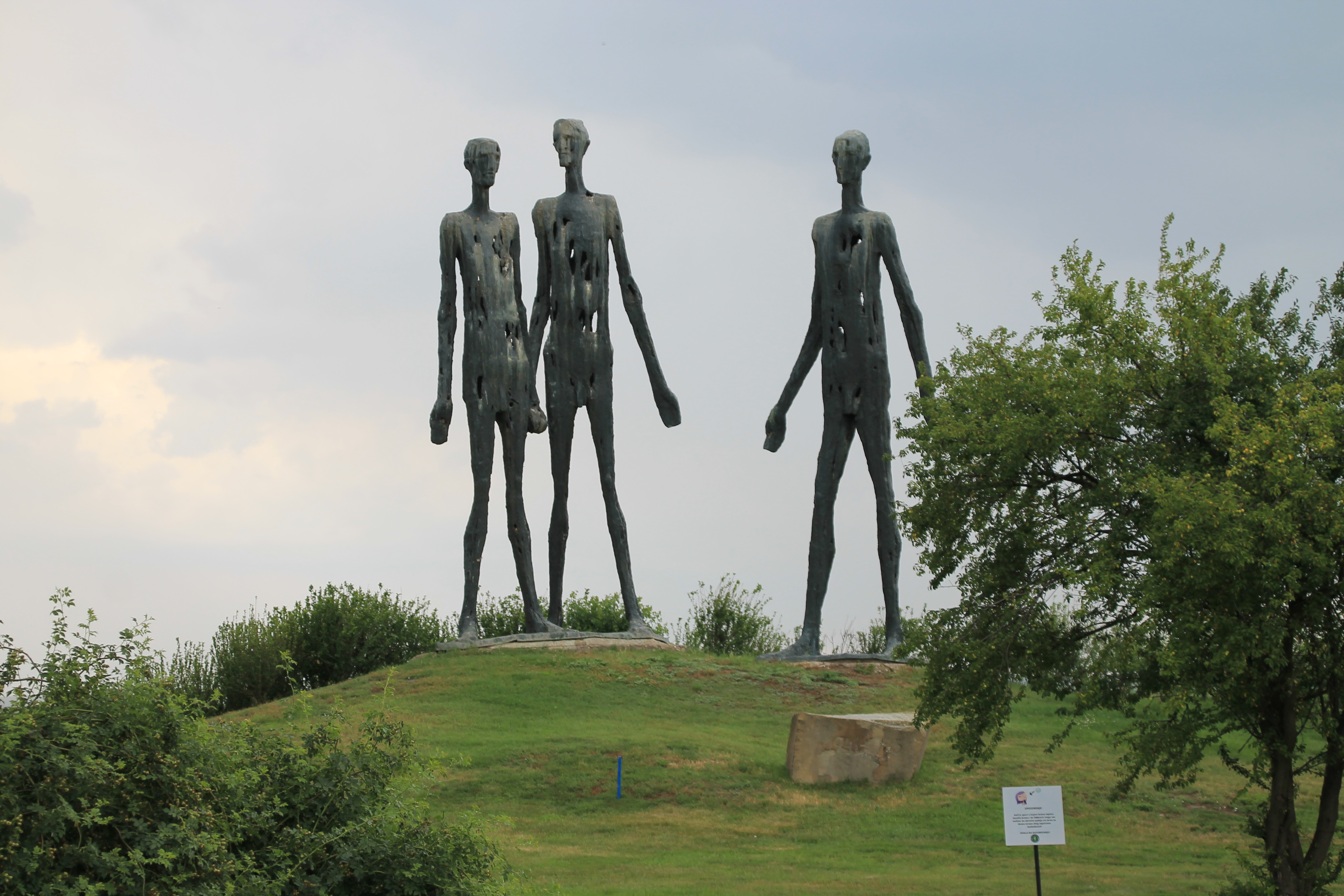
Crna Ćuprija monument to the victims of the raid in Žabalj

After questions were raised in the Hungarian parliament the prime minister László Bárdossy sent a commission of inquiry to investigate. That investigation supported the story that the army had been battling partisans. A further investigation by Bárdossy's successor Miklós Kállay came to similar conclusions.

In 1943, Hungary organized a trial of several officers who were among those responsible for the raids leading to prison terms ranging from 10 to 15 years. Four of those charged escaped to Germany before their sentencing. After the war, some of the individuals responsible for the raids, including Feketehalmy-Czeydner, were tried again by the new communist government of Hungary (which sentenced them to death or to life in prison) and again in Yugoslavia, where they were sentenced to death again, and executed. Horthy who was, according to Yugoslav/Serbian historians, among those responsible for the raids, was never indicted or tried. In September 2006, Efraim Zuroff of the Wiesenthal Center made public copies of a 1944 court verdict finding Sándor Képíró and 14 other Hungarian military and police officers of taking part in 1942 raid in Novi Sad. In 1948, the government of Hungary retried him in absentia and sentenced him to 14 years. This verdict was based upon the testimony of János Nagy, a former Hungarian soldier of Képíró's platoon. However, the testimony was given after the communist secret service tortured Nagy. Képíró, however, stated that as a police officer, his participation was limited merely to arresting civilians, and he did not take part in the executions or any other illegal activity. War crimes charges were subsequently brought against Képíró in a federal court in Budapest, for murders of civilians committed under his command during the January 1942 raids. His trial on those charges commenced in May 2011. Képíró was acquitted on all counts in July 2011. He died of natural causes two months later.

=== Retribution and formal apologies ===
Mass killings targeting Jews, such as those that occurred during the raid, were relatively uncommon in Hungary-proper and the occupied areas until October 1944, when the Germans assumed direct control of the country and the regions it had occupied, deporting hundreds of thousands of Jews to death camps.

In June 2013, President of Hungary János Áder apologised in Belgrade for the war crimes committed against civilian Serbs and Jewish people during the Hungarian occupation of Yugoslav territories. Some days earlier members of the Serbian Parliament adopted a declaration, which condemned the massacres and application of the principle of collective guilt against Hungarians in Vojvodina at the end of the Second World War.

== Legacy ==
Of the massacres perpetrated by the Hungarian occupational authorities in Yugoslavia, the raid in southern Bačka remains the most infamous. The killings have been referred to as the Novi Sad massacre, the Újvidék massacre, or simply The Raid (Serbo-Croatian: Racija).

In its aftermath, the historian Deborah S. Cornelius writes, "relations between Hungary and Serbia have never been the same." Decades hence, the raid continues to feature prominently in the Hungarian popular imagination, more so than most events from the war. It was depicted in Hungarian director András Kovács' 1966 film Cold Days (Hungarian: Hideg napok). It features prominently in Yugoslav writer Danilo Kiš's 1962 novel Psalm 44 (Serbo-Croatian: Psalm 44) and his 1972 novel Hourglass (Serbo-Croatian: Peščanik). The massacre held special significance for Kiš as his father was nearly killed during it.

The Yugoslav writer Aleksandar Tišma, who narrowly escaped being rounded up and killed in the massacre, explored the topic in his 1972 novel The Book About Blam (Serbo-Croatian: Knjiga o Blamu). It is also described in Tibor Cseres' 1991 book Blood Feud in Bačka (Hungarian: Vérbosszú Bácskában).

In 1971, a commemorative statue by the sculptor Jovan Soldatović was erected in Novi Sad, on the spot where the bodies of victims were tossed into the Danube. The inscription at the base of the statue reads:

Sećanje je spomenik tvrđi od kamena.
Ako smo ljudi oprostiti moramo, zaboraviti ne smemo.

Memory is a monument harder than stone.
If we are human, we must forgive, but not forget

Similar statues, also created by Soldatović, exist in Žabalj and Čurug. Commemorative ceremonies are held annually in Novi Sad and the other massacre sites.

In 2022, the Serbian Orthodox Church canonized the Orthodox Christian victims of the raid along with the victims of other Axis crimes committed in Bačka between 1941 and 1942 as the "Holy Martyrs of Bačka".

== See also ==
- Hungarian irredentism

== Bibliography ==
- Banac, Ivo (1988). The National Question in Yugoslavia: Origins, History, Politics. Ithaca, New York: Cornell University Press. ISBN 978-0-8014-9493-2.
- Bauer, Yehuda (1996). Jews for Sale? Nazi-Jewish Negotiations, 1933–1945. New Haven, Connecticut: Yale University Press. ISBN 978-0-3000-6852-8.
- Bloxham, Donald; Moses, A. Dirk (2011). "Genocide and Ethnic Cleansing". In Bloxham, Donald; Gerwarth, Robert (eds.). Political Violence in Twentieth-Century Europe. Cambridge, England: Cambridge University Press. pp. 87–139. ISBN 978-1-13950-129-3.
- Burns, Bryan (1996). World Cinema: Hungary. Teaneck, New Jersey: Fairleigh Dickinson University Press. ISBN 978-0-83863-722-7.
- Byford, Jovan (2011). "The Collaborationist Administration and the Treatment of the Jews in German-Occupied Serbia". In Ramet, Sabrina P.; Listhaug, Ola (eds.). Serbia and the Serbs in World War Two. London, England: Palgrave Macmillan. pp. 109–127. ISBN 978-0-230-27830-1.
- Byford, Jovan (2013). Himka, John-Paul; Michlic, Joanna Beata (eds.). Bringing the Dark Past to Light: The Reception of the Holocaust in Postcommunist Europe. Lincoln, Nebraska: Nebraska University Press. pp. 516–548. ISBN 978-0-8032-4647-8.
- Cornelius, Deborah S. (2011). Hungary in World War II: Caught in the Cauldron. New York, New York: Fordham University Press. ISBN 978-0-82323-773-9.
- Cymet, David (2010). History vs. Apologetics: The Holocaust, the Third Reich and the Catholic Church. Lanham, Maryland: Lexington Books. ISBN 978-0-73913-293-7.
- Golubović, Zvonimir (1992). Racija u Južnoj Bačkoj 1942. godine [The Raid in Southern Bačka in 1942] (in Serbo-Croatian). Novi Sad, Yugoslavia: Istorijski muzej Vojvodine. ISBN 978-8-68207-701-5.
- Iordanova, Dina (2003). Cinema of the Other Europe: The Industry and Artistry of East Central European Film. London, England: Wallflower Press. ISBN 978-1-90336-461-1.
- Klajn, Lajčo (2007). The Past in Present Times: The Yugoslav Saga. Lanham, Maryland: University Press of America. ISBN 978-0-7618-3647-6.
- Lemkin, Raphael (2008). Axis Rule in Occupied Europe. Clark, New Jersey: The Lawbook Exchange. ISBN 978-1-58477-901-8.
- Levene, Mark (2013). Annihilation: The European Rimlands, 1939–1953. The Crisis of Genocide. Vol. 2. Oxford, England: Oxford University Press. ISBN 978-0-19-150555-3.
- Mazower, Mark (2008). Hitler's Empire: Nazi Rule in Occupied Europe. London, England: Allen Lane. ISBN 978-0-7139-9681-4.
- Mojzes, Paul (2011). Balkan Genocides: Holocaust and Ethnic Cleansing in the 20th Century. Lanham, Maryland: Rowman & Littlefield. ISBN 978-1-4422-0665-6.
- Neubauer, John (2006). "Upstream and Downstream the Danube". In Cornis-Pope, Marcel; Neubauer, John (eds.). Junctures and Disjunctures in the 19th and 20th centuries. History of the Literary Cultures of East-Central Europe. Vol. 2. Philadelphia, Pennsylvania: John Benjamins Publishing. pp. 224–231. ISBN 978-9-02729-340-4.
- Patai, Raphael (1996). The Jews of Hungary: History, Culture, Psychology. Detroit, Michigan: Wayne State University Press. ISBN 978-0-81432-561-2.
- Pavlowitch, Stevan K. (2007). Hitler's New Disorder: The Second World War in Yugoslavia. New York, New York: Columbia University Press. ISBN 978-1-85065-895-5.
- Ramet, Sabrina P. (2006). The Three Yugoslavias: State-Building and Legitimation, 1918–2005. Bloomington, Indiana: Indiana University Press. ISBN 978-0-253-34656-8.
- Roberts, Walter R. (1973). Tito, Mihailović and the Allies 1941–1945. Durham, North Carolina: Duke University Press. ISBN 978-0-8223-0773-0.
- Rummel, Rudolph J. (1998). Statistics of Democide: Genocide and Mass Murder Since 1900. LIT Verlag Münster. ISBN 978-3-8258-4010-5.
- Sajti, Enikő A. (2003). Hungarians in the Voivodina, 1918–1947. Boulder, Colorado: Social Science Monographs. ISBN 978-0-88033-522-5.
- Thomas, Nigel; Szabo, Laszlo (2012). The Royal Hungarian Army in World War II. Oxford, England: Osprey Publishing. ISBN 978-1-84603-795-5.
- Thompson, Mark (2013). Birth Certificate: The Story of Danilo Kiš. Ithaca, New York: Cornell University Press. ISBN 978-0-8014-4888-1.
- Tomasevich, Jozo (2001). War and Revolution in Yugoslavia, 1941–1945: Occupation and Collaboration. Stanford, California: Stanford University Press. ISBN 978-0-8047-3615-2.
- Ungváry, Krisztián (2011). "Vojvodina under Hungarian Rule". In Ramet, Sabrina P.; Listhaug, Ola (eds.). Serbia and the Serbs in World War Two. London, England: Palgrave Macmillan. pp. 70–89. ISBN 978-0-230-27830-1.
- Yahil, Leni (1991). The Holocaust: The Fate of European Jewry, 1932–1945. Oxford, England: Oxford University Press. ISBN 978-0-19504-523-9.
- Zuroff, Efraim (2009). Operation Last Chance: One Man's Quest to Bring Nazi Criminals to Justice. New York, New York: Palgrave Macmillan. ISBN 978-0-23010-138-8.
