= Polja (literary magazine) =

Serbian literary magazine

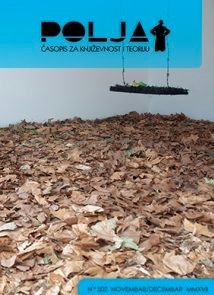
- Editor: Cultural Center
- Categories: Literary magazine
- Founded: 1955
- Country: Serbia
- Based in: Novi Sad
- Language: Serbian
- ISSN: 0032-3578

Polja (Serbian-Cyrillic: поља; English: Fields) is a Serbian literary magazine.

== History ==
In 1955, the magazine of literature and theory (Serbian: Časopis za književnost i teoriju; Часопис за књижевност и теорију) was launched as a cultural initiative in the creative framework of the program Tribina mladih (The Tribune of Youth) by the Cultural Center of Novi Sad. Over the decades, Polja has received supraregional recognition. The magazine presents cultural currents and features authors in the fields of literature, cultural theory and literary criticism. It has a history of providing a platform for social criticism, which reflects the social and political situation in the country and the culture of its time. The editing history of its elaboration illustrates a specific cultural-theoretical aspect of the magazine and its editorships: the content was distributed in various periods either in Latin (No. 1/1955 – No. 398/1992, 2001 — No. 479/2013) or Cyrillic (No. 399/1992 – 2000, No. 480/2013 – No. 496/2015) scripture, which in fact its significance in Serbian cultural reality had neither enhanced nor decreased.

The journal has published numerous texts by contemporary authors from Serbia and other countries of the world. The editorial-staff of the magazine presented some international authors for the first time in Serbia by publishing translated texts thereby making aware of them. The compiled texts by domestic and foreign authors contrast the artistic field of tension in contemporary literature as well as its different aesthetic and philosophical fundamentals as a mirror of Serbia's society on the way to an open society. The international authors represented include personalities such as Venero Armanno, Nancy Armstrong, John Barth, Walter Benjamin, Terry Eagleton, Dan Fante, Jonathan Franzen, David Foster Wallace, Carlos Fuentes, Jean Giraudoux, Kenneth Goldsmith, Günter Kunert, Haruki Murakami, Adrienne Rich, Edward Said, W. G. Sebald, William Trevor, Franz Werfel and Slavoj Žižek.

Since its inception, the publication has been produced by several printing houses in Vrbas, Novi Sad (Sajnos since 2008) and Sremska Kamenica. The first editor-in-chief was female and a member of the Romanian minority in Vojvodina. The poet Maja Solar was member of the editorial-board from 2007 to 2014. The literary scholar Sonja Veselinović has been a member of the editorial board since 2007, and the poet Marjan Čakarević since 2014. The journal's graphic appearance has been designed by painter Maja Erdeljanin since 2007.

== Editors-in-chief ==
- Florika Štefan (1955-1958)
- Dejan Poznanović (1958-1962)
- Mileta Radovanović (1962-1965)
- Petar Milosavljević (1965–1968)
- Pero Zubac (1968-1973)
- Boško Ivkov (1973-1975)
- Jaroslav Turčan (1975-1976)
- Jovan Zivlak (1976-1984)
- Đorđe Pisarev (1984-1985)
- Franja Petrinović (1985-1996)
- Zoran Đerić (1996-2000)
- Laslo Blašković (2001-2007; No. 415/2001–No.447/2007),
- Alen Bešić (since No. 448/2007)
