= Hourglass (Kiš novel) =

Peščanik is a 1972 novel by Yugoslav novelist Danilo Kiš, translated as Hourglass by Ralph Manheim (1990). Hourglass tells the account of the final months in a man's life before he is sent to a concentration camp. Hourglass is in part based on the life of the author's Jewish father, who was murdered in Auschwitz.
