= A Tomb for Boris Davidovich =

Short stories by Danilo Kiš written in 1976

- Original Serbo-Croatian edition
- Original title: Grobnica za Borisa Davidoviča
- Translator: Duška Mikić-Mitchell
- Language: Serbo-Croatian
- Published: BIGZ (original, 1976); Harcourt Brace Jovanovich (English-language, 1978)
- Media type: Book
- Pages: 135
- ISBN: 9780140054521
- OCLC: 6196718

A Tomb for Boris Davidovich (Serbo-Croatian: Grobnica za Borisa Davidoviča / Гробница за Бориса Давидовича) is a collection of seven short stories by Danilo Kiš written in 1976 (translated into English by Duška Mikić-Mitchell in 1978). The stories are based on historical events and deal with themes of political deception, betrayal, and murder in Eastern Europe during the first half of the 20th century (except for "Dogs and Books" which takes place in 14th century France). Several of the stories are written as fictional biographies wherein the main characters interact with historical figures. The Dalkey Archive Press edition includes an introduction by Joseph Brodsky and an afterword by William T. Vollmann. Harold Bloom includes A Tomb for Boris Davidovich in his list of canonical works of the period he names the Chaotic Age (1900–present) in The Western Canon. The book was featured in Penguin's series "Writers from the Other Europe" from the 1970s, edited by Philip Roth.

== Contents ==
=== "The Knife with the Rosewood Handle" ===
Miksha is a Jewish tailor's apprentice turned revolutionary whose commitment and cruelty lead him to commit a sordid murder and die in prison.

=== "The Sow that Eats her Farrow" ===
Verschoyle, a Republican volunteer in the Spanish Civil War, is punished for criticizing the Soviet takeover.

=== "The Mechanical Lions" ===
Chelyustnikov organizes a fake religious service for a Western dignitary visiting Kyiv.

=== "The Magic Card Dealing" ===
The story’s main character is Karl Georgievich Taube, also known as Dr. Taube who is murdered in 1956 after spending time in various prison camps. Kostik Korshunidze, a master criminal known as "the king of thieves" is arrested and confesses to the murder

=== "A Tomb for Boris Davidovich" ===
Boris Davidovich Novsky, a noted revolutionary, is arrested with the intent to extract a confession from him in a show-trial. During his interrogation Novsky duels with his interrogator Fedukin over how he will be remembered in the future, fighting over the conclusion to his biography.

=== "Dogs and Books" ===
Set up as a parallel to "Boris Davidovich", the story deals with Baruch David Neumann, a Jew forced to convert to Christianity during the Shepherds' Crusade (1320). In the year 1330, Bishop Monsignor Jacques is informed of a man named Baruch David Neumann. A German refugee and "former jew" who had converted back to Judaism from Christianity. Upon hearing this the Bishop orders that he be arrested immediately and imprisoned for his actions. The Bishop assembles various representatives and magistrates once they are situated, the bishop begins to question Baruch who then explains his story.

The story of Baruch David Neumann comes from a translation of the third chapter of Registers of the Inquisition in which Jacques Fournier (the future Pope Benedict XII) had recorded the confessions and testimony. The manuscript is kept in the Fondi Latin of the Vatican Library. Danilo Kiš notes that he discovered the story of Baruch David Neumann after writing his short story "A Tomb for Boris Davidovich", in which he found a number of coincidental similarities between the historical figure and his character Boris Davidovich (including their similar names). In the short story collection that both works are found in, Kiš intentionally places the story Dogs and Books after the story A Tomb for Boris Davidovich.

=== "The Short Biography of A. A. Darmolatov" ===
A. A. Darmolatov is born in a small town called Nikolaevski, he is inspired by father who is a biologist to pursue an interest in nature at a young age. His parents foster his interests, buying books and allowing him to dissect small animals with his father. As he grows older he becomes more politically and socially aware. He begins reading ancient texts and comes to despise the present, he becomes bored of his environment and the so called "positivistically educated middle class".

== Themes ==
The Tomb for Boris Davidovich covers many themes of Stalinism, fascism, and Yugoslav society under communism. The book also discusses much about Judaism and the treatment of Jews in Europe. Kiš features many criticisms of exclusivist or ethnic nationalist thinking. The collection A Tomb for Boris Davidovich was a highly political book but Kiš did not want its political nature to overrule the literary value. Kiš, in reference to the book, said it was "poetry about a political subject, not politics." Kiš’s political views and messages that he portrayed resulted in much criticism and controversy surrounding the collection.

== Publication and reception ==
Danilo Kiš (1935-1989) was a Serbian-Jewish-Yugoslav author who wrote novels, essays, short stories as well as translating various works. By the time he published The Tomb for Boris Davidovich in 1976, Kiš was already an accomplished writer and had received various literary prizes. The short story collection was not subject to censorship but displeased the league of communists for its anti-nationalist themes.

After the book's publication, it was heavily criticized by an editor named Dragan Jeremić. His ongoing criticisms as well as accusations in the press led Kiš to write "Čas Anatomije" or "The Anatomy Lesson" in 1978, which was a literary apology addressing his critics. In "Čas Anatomije" Kiš criticized Jeremić and others as being anti-literary and echoing nationalist opinions. After Kiš responded”, Jeremić published a volume of literary criticisms and theories called "Narcis bez lica" or "Shameless Narcissist" in 1980, the work held many sentiments specifically targeted at Kiš. In the same year Boro Krivokapić, a Yugoslavian journalist, wrote "Treba li spaliti Kiša" or "Should Kiš be Burned at the Stake?". Krivokapić’s publication directly critiques the book A Tomb for Boris Davidovich as well as The Anatomy Lesson.

== Adaptations ==
In 2011, Kiš's work, A Tomb for Boris Davidovich, in particular the titular short story within it, 'A Tomb for Davidovich', was adapted into a short film. The film is roughly three minutes and directed by Aleksander Kostic, narrated by Predrag 'Miki' Manojlovic, known for Underground (1955), The Heir Apparent: Largo Winch (2008), and The Bra (2018), and illustrated by Dragana Vučetić. The adaptation consists of Manoglovic narrating a summary of the events of 'A Tomb for Boris Davidovich while rough sketches illustrate the events in tandem. The images appear as they are drawn, and lack animation to generate the appearance of movement in each scene. The film lacks any apparent notable awards and global recognition.

In 2017, an adaptation of the short story, 'A Tomb for Boris Davidovich', was produced, once again from Kiš's larger work A Tomb for Boris Davidovich, as a theatrical play. The play was produced by the Slovenian National Theatre Drama Ljubljana, more colloquially known as SNT Drama Ljubljana, and directed by Aleksandar Popovoski. The cast consisted of thirteen members and a fully staffed crew for music, choreography, set design, costumes, lighting, sound, and more. Popovoski described the intention of the play to "look" for a "tiny misplaced atom" that represents "justice", making it an "atom of humanity", to show what "keeps" people "human". The play was given positive reviews by Igor Burić, a writer for the Dnevik newspaper in Bulgaria, Mina Petrić on an online journal. The play first opened on October 2, 2017 with a reported runtime of ninety-five minutes.

== Plagiarism controversy ==
The book was the subject of a long-running plagiarism controversy, one of the most famous literary scandals in Tito's Yugoslavia. Kiš was accused of plagiarising 7000 days in Siberia by Karlo Štajner. Kiš wrote a book titled The Anatomy Lesson, written in 1978, in which he defended his methods as legitimate, and launched harsh personal and professional attacks on his critics. In 1981 a book Narcis bez lica by Yugoslav critic Dragan M. Jeremic, was again devoted to in-depth analysis of A Tomb for Boris Davidovich, in which the case for plagiarism has been made again by comparing originals and Kiš' prose in detail. Serbian critics overwhelmingly reject the plagiarism charge.
