= Danilo Kiš =

Serbian and Yugoslav novelist (1935–1989)

- Данило Киш
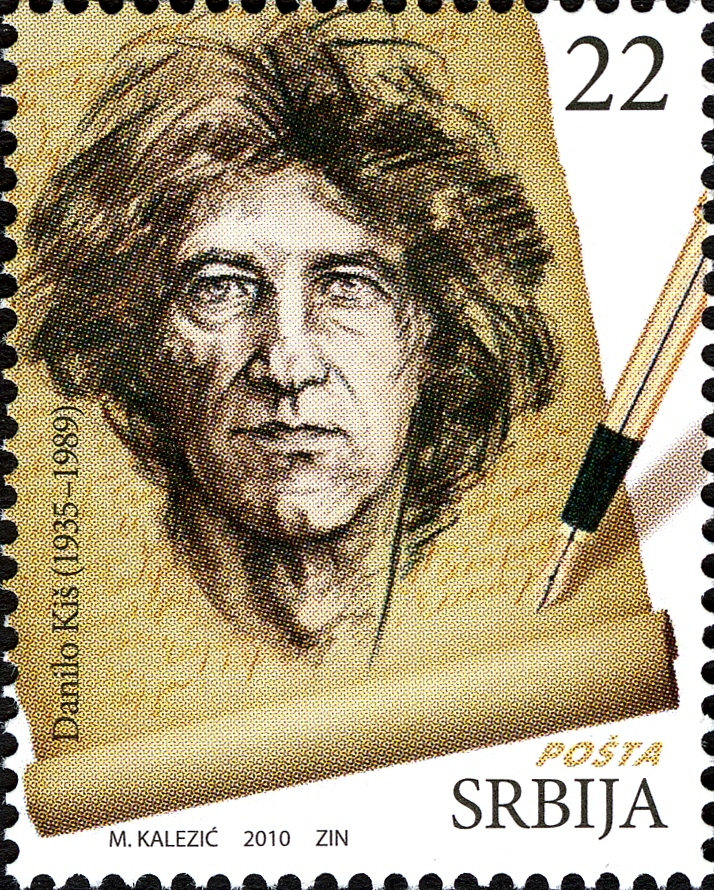
- Danilo Kiš on a 2010 Serbian stamp
- Born: Dániel Kiss; 22 February 1935; Subotica, Kingdom of Yugoslavia
- Died: 15 October 1989 (aged 54); Paris, France
- Resting place: Belgrade's New Cemetery
- Education: University of Belgrade Faculty of Philology
- Occupations: Novelist; short story writer; poet
- Spouse: Mirjana Miočinović (m. 1962–1981)
- Partner: Pascale Delpech (1981–1989)
- Writing career
- Language: Serbian, Serbo-Croatian, Hungarian
- Years active: 1953–1989
- Notable awards: NIN Award (1972); Ordre des Arts et des Lettres (1986)

Signature
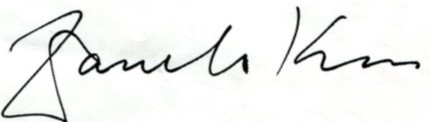

Danilo Kiš (Serbian Cyrillic: Данило Киш; born Dániel Kiss; 22 February 1935 – 15 October 1989) was a Yugoslav and Serbian novelist, short story writer, essayist and translator. His best known works include Hourglass, A Tomb for Boris Davidovich and The Encyclopedia of the Dead.

== Life and work ==
=== Early life ===
Danilo Kiš was born in Subotica, Danube Banovina, Kingdom of Yugoslavia (present-day Serbia). His parents were Eduard Kiš (Hungarian: Kis Ede), a Hungarian-speaking Jewish railway inspector, and Milica (née Dragićević), a Montenegrin Serb from Cetinje. His father was born in Austria-Hungary with the surname Kohn, but changed it to Kis as part of Magyarization, a widely implemented practice at the time. Kiš's parents met in 1930 in Subotica and married the following year. Milica gave birth to a daughter, Danica, in Zagreb in 1932 before the family relocated to Subotica.

Kiš's father was an unsteady and often absent figure in Danilo's childhood. Eduard Kiš spent time in a psychiatric hospital in Belgrade in 1934 and again in 1939. Kiš visited his father in the hospital during one of his later stays. This visit, in which, Kiš recalled his father asking his mother for a pair of scissors with which to commit suicide, made a strong impression on young Danilo. For many years, Kiš believed that his father's psychological troubles stemmed from alcoholism. Only in the 1970s did Kiš learn that his father had suffered from anxiety neurosis. Between stays in the hospital, Eduard Kiš edited the 1938 edition of the Yugoslav National and International Travel Guide. Young Danilo saw his father as a traveller and a writer. Eduard Scham, the eccentric father of the protagonist of Early Sorrows, Garden, Ashes, and Hourglass is largely based on Kiš's own father.

=== World War II ===
Kiš's parents were concerned with the rising tide of anti-Semitism all around Europe in the late 1930s. In 1939, they oversaw three-year-old Danilo's baptism into the Eastern Orthodox Church in Novi Sad, where the Kiš family resided at the time. Kiš later acknowledged that this action likely saved his life, since as the son of a Jewish convert to Christianity, Danilo would probably have been subject to persecution without definitive proof of his Christian faith.

In April 1941, Hungarian troops, in alliance with Nazi Germany, invaded the northern Yugoslavian province of Vojvodina. After Hungary declared war on the Allied powers in 1941, territory was annexed and officials began to persecute Jews in the region. On 20 January 1942, gendarmes and troops invaded Novi Sad, and two days later, gendarmes massacred thousands of Serbs and Jews in their homes and around the city. Eduard Kiš was among a large group of people rounded up and taken by the gendarmes to the banks of the frozen Danube to be shot. Eduard managed to survive, only because the hole in the ice where the gendarmes were dumping the bodies of the dead became so clogged with bodies that the commanders called for the officers to stop the killing. Kiš later described the massacre as the start of his "conscious life".

Following the massacre, Eduard relocated his family to Kerkabarabás, a town in southwest Hungary. Danilo attended primary school in Kerkabarabás. Through 1944, Hungarian Jews were largely safe, as compared to Jews in other Axis-occupied countries since Hungarian officials were reluctant to hand over Jews to the Nazis. However, in mid 1944 authorities began to deport Jews en masse to concentration camps. Eduard Kiš was sent to a ghetto in Zalaegerszeg in April or May 1944, then was deported to Auschwitz on 5 July. Eduard, along with many of his relatives, was murdered in Auschwitz. Danilo, Danica, and Milica, perhaps owing to Danilo and Danica's baptism certificates, were saved from deportation.

Kiš's father's murder had a massive impact on his work. Kiš crafted his own father into Eduard Scham, the father of the protagonist of Early Sorrows, Garden, Ashes, and Hourglass. Kiš described his father as a "mythical figure," and would continually claim that his father had not been murdered in Auschwitz but had "disappeared."

=== Post-war life ===
After the end of the war, the family moved to Cetinje, Montenegro, Yugoslavia, where Kiš graduated from high school in 1954. Kiš studied literature at the University of Belgrade. He was an excellent student, receiving praise from students and faculty members alike. He graduated in 1958 as the first student at the University of Belgrade to be awarded a degree in comparative literature. After graduating, Kiš stayed on for two years of postgraduate research.

=== Career ===
While doing research at the University of Belgrade, Kiš was a prominent writer for Vidici magazine, where he worked until 1960. In 1962 he published his first two novels, Mansarda (translated as The Garret) and Psalm 44. He then took up a position as a lector at the University of Strasbourg. He held the position until 1973. In that period, he translated several French books into Serbo-Croatian. He also wrote and published Garden, Ashes (1965), Early Sorrows (1969), and Hourglass (1972). For his novel Peščanik (Hourglass), Kiš received the prestigious NIN Award, but returned it a few years later due to a political dispute. He was awarded the Andrić Prize for Enciklopedija mrtvih in 1983.

Kiš was influenced by James Joyce, Marcel Proust, Bruno Schulz, Vladimir Nabokov, Jorge Luis Borges, Boris Pilnyak, Ivo Andrić and Miroslav Krleža among other authors.

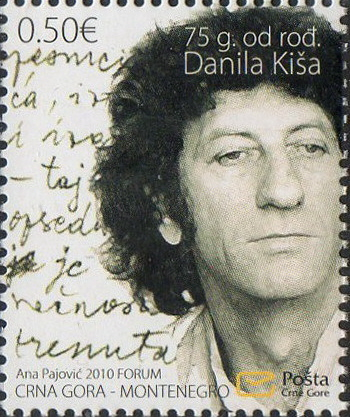
Danilo Kiš on a 2010 Montenegrin stamp

=== Plagiarism controversy ===
In 1976, A Tomb for Boris Davidovich was published. Kiš drew inspiration for the novel from his time as a lecturer at the University of Bordeaux.

Kiš returned to Belgrade that year only to be hit by claims that he plagiarized portions of the novel from any number of authors. Critics also attacked the novel for its alleged anti-communist themes.

Kiš responded to the scandal by writing The Anatomy Lesson. In the book, he accused his critics of parroting nationalist opinions and of being anti-literary. Several of the people that Kiš criticized in The Anatomy Lesson sought retribution following its publication. In 1981, Dragan Jeremić, a professor of aesthetics at the University of Belgrade and opponent of Kiš, published Narcissus without a Face in which he reasserted his claim that Kiš had plagiarized A Tomb for Boris Davidovich. Dragoljub Golubović, the journalist who published the first story accusing Kiš of plagiarism, sued Kiš for defamation. The case was eventually dismissed in March 1979, but not after it drew substantial attention from the public.

=== Move to Paris ===
Rattled by the plagiarism controversy and subsequent defamation lawsuit, Kiš left Belgrade for Paris in the summer of 1979. In 1983 he published The Encyclopedia of the Dead. During this period in his life, Kiš achieved greater global recognition as his works were translated into several languages.

=== Death and Funeral ===
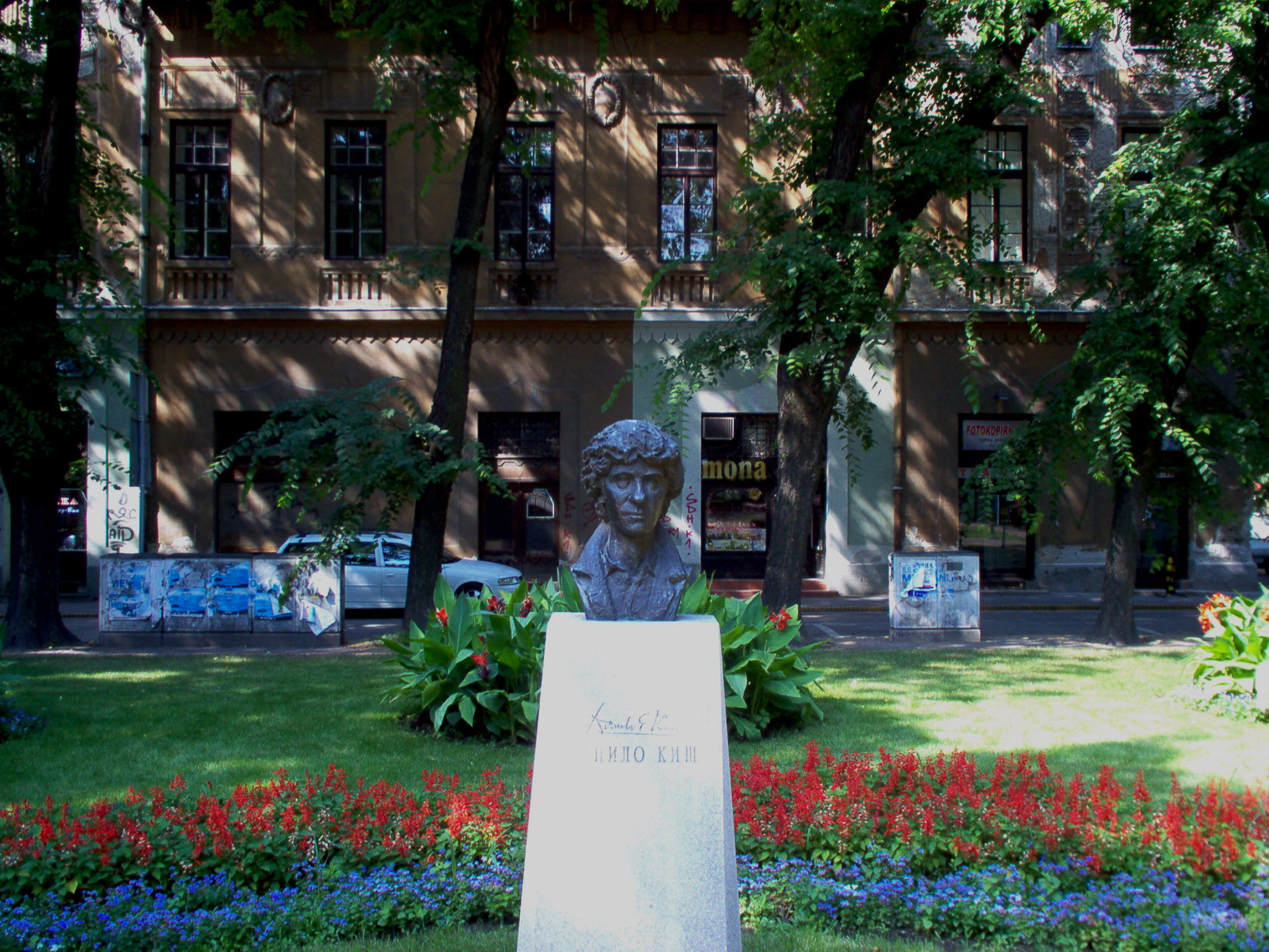
Bust of Kiš in Subotica

Kiš was diagnosed with lung cancer in 1986 and had an operation. In 1989, the cancer returned and he died on October 15 1989. Kiš was 54 at the time of his death, the same age that his father had been when he was sent to Auschwitz. As per his request, he was buried in Belgrade with the Serbian Orthodox Church rite.

=== Personal life ===
Kiš was married to Mirjana Miočinović from 1962 to 1981. At the time of his death, he was living with Pascale Delpech, his former student from the University of Bordeaux.

Kiš was a close friend of writer Susan Sontag. After his death, Sontag edited and published Homo Poeticus, a compilation of Kiš's essays and interviews.

== Style and themes ==
Kiš was influenced especially by Jorge Luis Borges: he had been accused of plagiarizing, among others, Borges in A Tomb for Boris Davidovich, which prompted a "scathing response" in The Anatomy Lesson (1978), and the influence of Borges is recognized in The Encyclopedia of the Dead. From Bruno Schulz, the Polish writer and prose stylist, Kiš picked up "mythic elements" for The Encyclopedia of the Dead, and he reportedly told John Updike that "Schulz is my God".

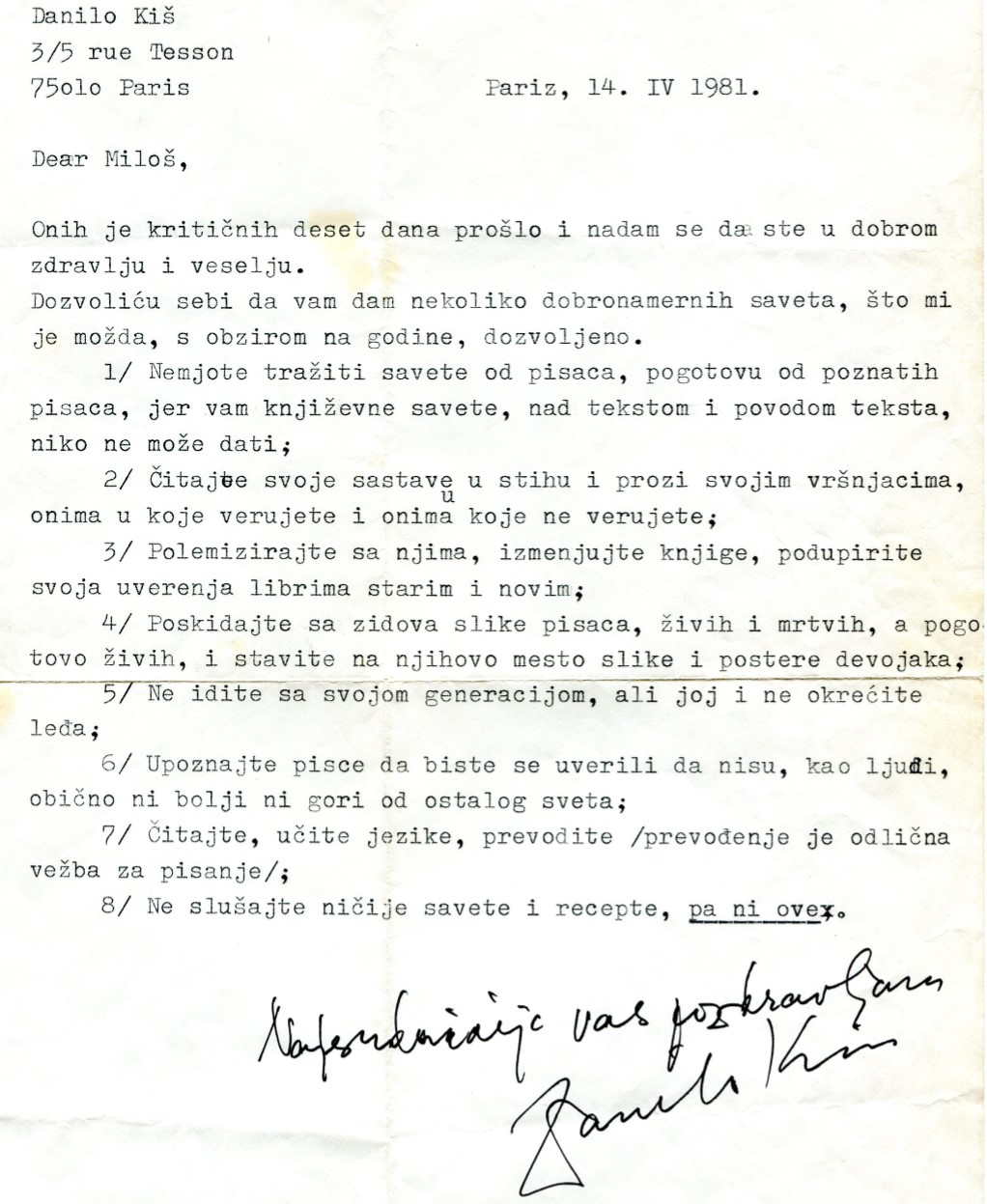
Kiš's letter addressed to Miloš Janković for his birthday in 1981. In 1984 Kiš wrote "Advice to a Young Writer", based on this letter. It is currently displayed in the Adligat museum in Belgrade.

Branko Gorjup sees two distinct periods in Kiš's career as a novelist. The first, which includes Psalm 44, Garden, Ashes, and Early Sorrows, is marked by realism: Kiš creates characters whose psychology "reflect[s] the external world of the writer's memories, dreams, and nightmares, or his experiences of the time and space in which he lives". The worlds he constructed in his narratives, while he distanced himself from pure mimesis, were still constructed to be believable. The separation from mimesis he sought to achieve by a kind of deception through language, a process intended to instil 'doubts' and 'trepidations' associated with a child's growing pains and early sorrows. The success of this 'deception' depended upon the effect of 'recognition' on the part of the reader". The point, for Kiš, was to make the reader accept "the illusion of a created reality". In those early novels, Kiš still employed traditional narrators and his plots unfolded chronologically, but in later novels, beginning with Hourglass (the third volume of the "Family Cycle", after Garden, Ashes and Early Sorrows), his narrative techniques changed considerably and traditional plotlines were no longer followed. The role of the narrator was strongly reduced, and perspective and plot were fragmented: in Hourglass, which in Eduard Scham portrayed a father figure resembling the author's, "at least four different Schams with four separate personalities" were presented, each based on documentary evidence. This focus on the manipulation and selection of supposed documentary evidence is a hallmark of Kiš's later period, and underlies the method of A Tomb for Boris Davidovich, according to Branko Gorjup:

First, most of the plots in the work are derived or borrowed from already-existing sources of varied literary significance, some easily recognizable—for example, those extracted from Roy Medvedev and Karl Steiner—while others are more obscure. Second, Kiš employs the technique of textual transposition, whereby entire sections or series of fragments, often in their unaltered state, are taken from other texts and freely integrated into the fabric of his work.

This documentary style places Kiš's later work in what he himself called a post-Borges period, but unlike Borges, the documentation comes from "historically and politically relevant material", which in A Tomb for Boris Davidovich is used to denounce Stalinism. Unlike Borges, Kiš is not interested in metaphysics, but in "more ordinary phenomena"; in the title story of The Encyclopedia of the Dead, this means building an encyclopedia "containing the biography of every ordinary life lived since 1789".

== Adaptations and translations of Kiš's work ==
A film based on Peščanik (Fövenyóra), directed by Hungarian director Szabolcs Tolnai, was finished in 2008. In May 1989, with his friend, director Aleksandar Mandić, Kiš made the four-episode TV series Goli Život about the lives of two Jewish women. The filming took place in Israel. The programme was broadcast after his death, in the spring of 1990, and was his last work.

Kiš's work was translated into English only in a piecemeal fashion, and many of his important books weren't available in English until the 2010s, when Dalkey Archive began releasing a selection of titles, including A Tomb for Boris Davidovich and Garden, Ashes; in 2012, Dalkey released The Attic, Psalm 44, and the posthumous collection of stories The Lute and the Scars, capably translated by John K. Cox. These publications completed the process of "the Englishing of Kiš's fiction", allowing the possibility of what Pete Mitchell of Booktrust called a resurrection of Kiš.

== Bibliography ==
- Mansarda: satirična poema, 1962 (novel); translated as The Attic by John K. Cox (2008)
- Psalm 44, 1962 (novel); translated as Psalm 44 by John K. Cox (2012)
- Bašta, pepeo, 1965 (novel); translated as Garden, Ashes by William J. Hannaher (1975)
- Rani jadi: za decu i osetljive, 1970 (short stories); translated as Early Sorrows: For Children and Sensitive Readers by Michael Henry Heim (1998)
- Peščanik, 1972 (novel); translated as Hourglass by Ralph Manheim (1990)
- Po-etika, 1972 (essay)
- Po-etika, knjiga druga, 1974 (interviews)
- Grobnica za Borisa Davidoviča: sedam poglavlja jedne zajedničke povesti, 1976 (short stories); translated as A Tomb for Boris Davidovich by Duška Mikić-Mitchell (1978)
- Čas anatomije, 1978 (book-essay about writing and politics in the Balkans)
- Noć i magla, 1983 (drama) translated as Night and Fog: The Collected Dramas and Screenplays of Danilo Kiš by John K. Cox (2014)
- Homo poeticus, 1983 (essays and interviews); translated as Homo Poeticus: Essays and Interviews by Ralph Manheim, Michael Henry Heim, and Francis Jones (1995)
- Enciklopedija mrtvih, 1983 (short stories); translated as The Encyclopedia of the Dead by Michael Henry Heim (1989)
- Gorki talog iskustva, 1990 (interviews)
- Život, literatura, 1990 (interviews and essays)
- Pesme i prepevi, 1992 (poetry)
- Lauta i ožiljci, 1994 (short stories); translated as The Lute and the Scars by John K. Cox (2012)
- Skladište, 1995 (texts)
- Varia, 1995 (essays, articles and short stories)
- Pesme, Elektra, 1995 (poetry and an adaptation from the drama Elektra)
