= Axis occupation of Vojvodina =

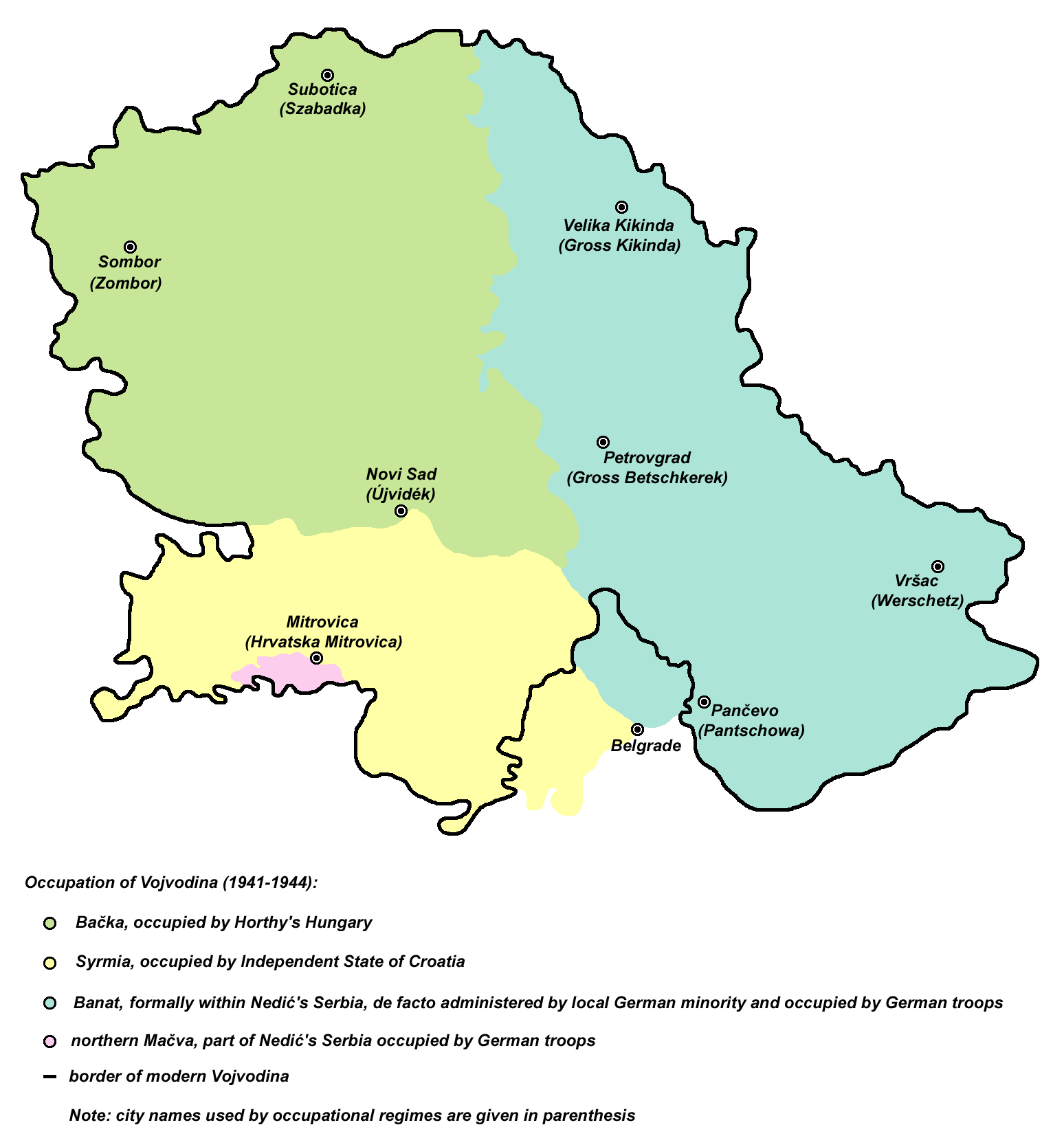
Map showing occupation zones in Vojvodina from 1941 to 1944.

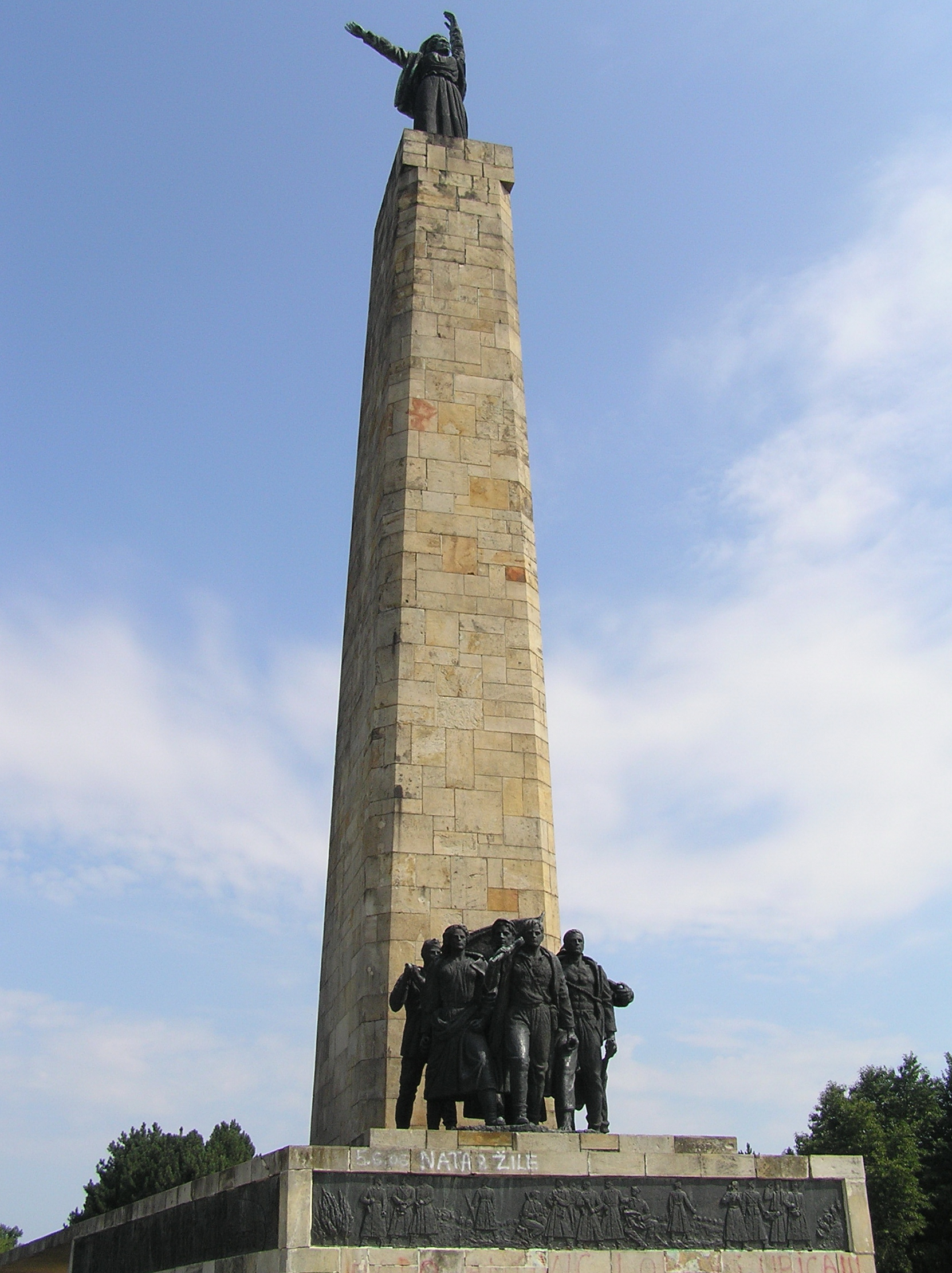
The Freedom Monument on the Fruška Gora, dedicated to the resistance movement in Vojvodina

The military occupation of the Yugoslav region of Vojvodina (now in Serbia) from 1941 to 1944 was carried out by Nazi Germany and its client states / puppet regimes: Horthy's Hungary and Independent State of Croatia.

In 1941, during World War II, Nazi Germany, Fascist Italy and Hungary invaded and occupied Yugoslavia. The modern-day Vojvodina region (then the northern part of Danube Banovina province of Yugoslavia) was divided into three occupation zones: Banat was part of the area governed by the Military Administration in Serbia and was de facto under control of its ethnic German minority; Bačka was attached to Horthy's Hungary; while Syrmia was attached to Independent State of Croatia. The occupation lasted until 1944, when the region came under control of the Soviet Red Army and Yugoslav partisans.

== War crimes ==
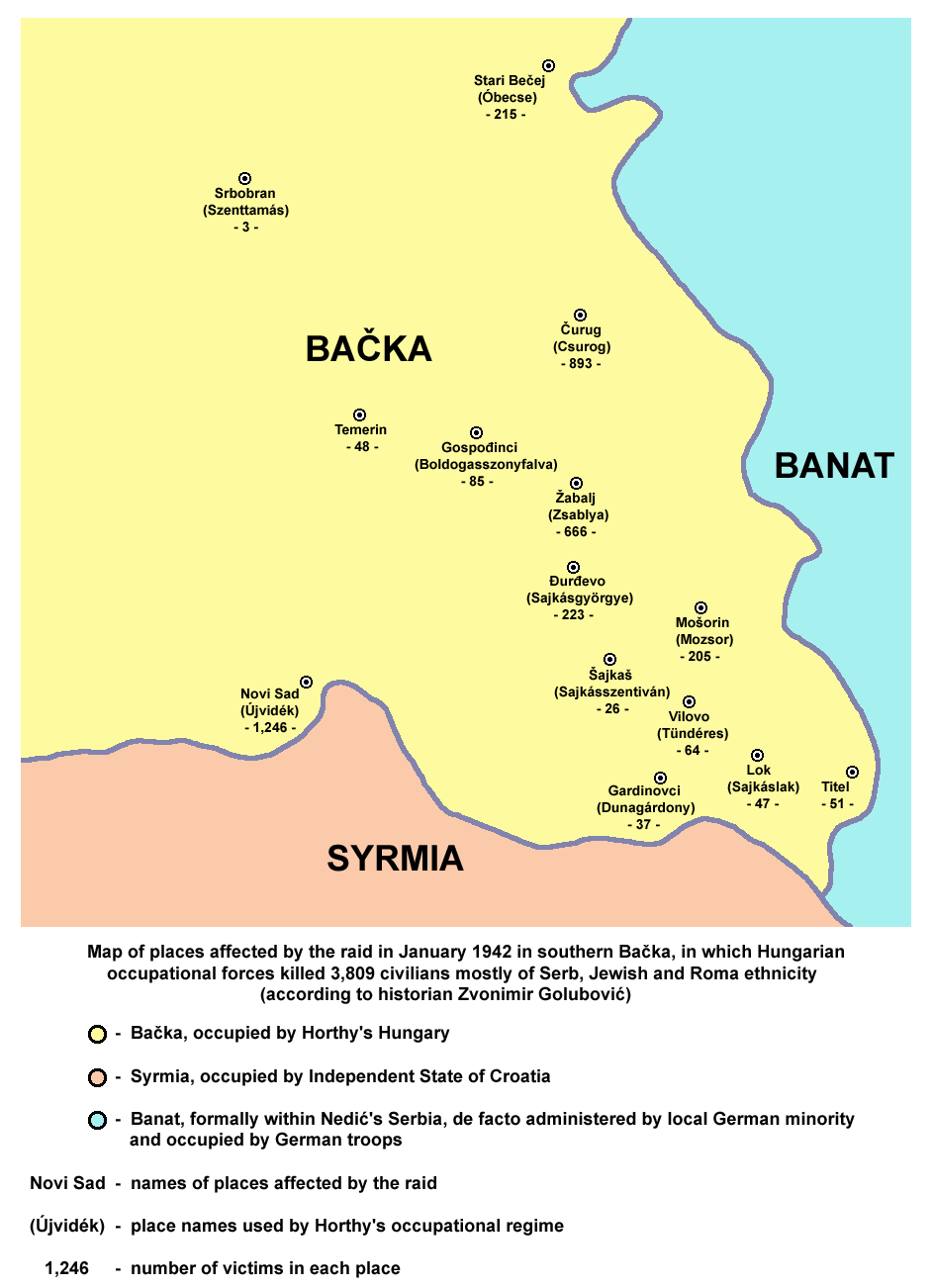
Map of places affected by the raid in January 1942 in southern Bačka, in which Hungarian occupational forces killed 3,809 civilians mostly of Serb, Jewish and Roma ethnicity (according to historian Zvonimir Golubović).

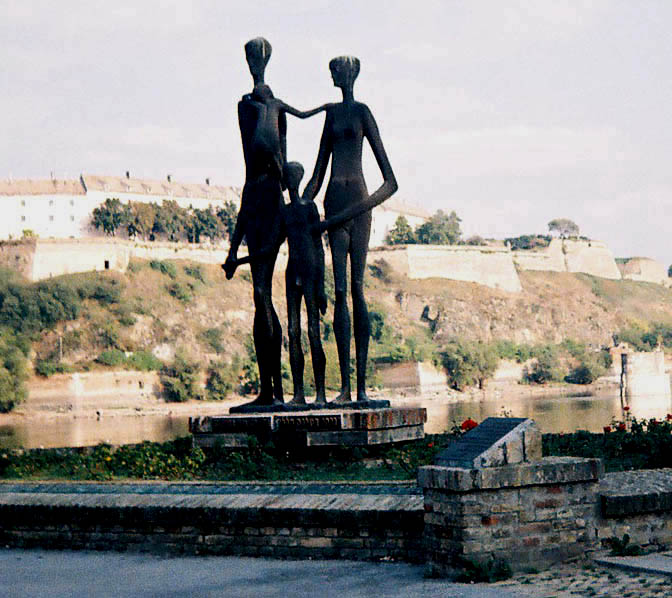
Monument in Novi Sad dedicated to killed Serbian and Jewish civilians in the 1942 raid.

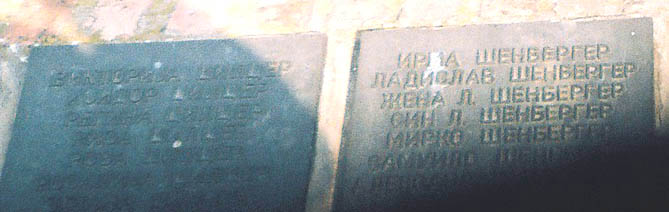
Boards with the names of the victims of the 1942 raid in Novi Sad. There are 66 boards with 1,244 known names of the victims.

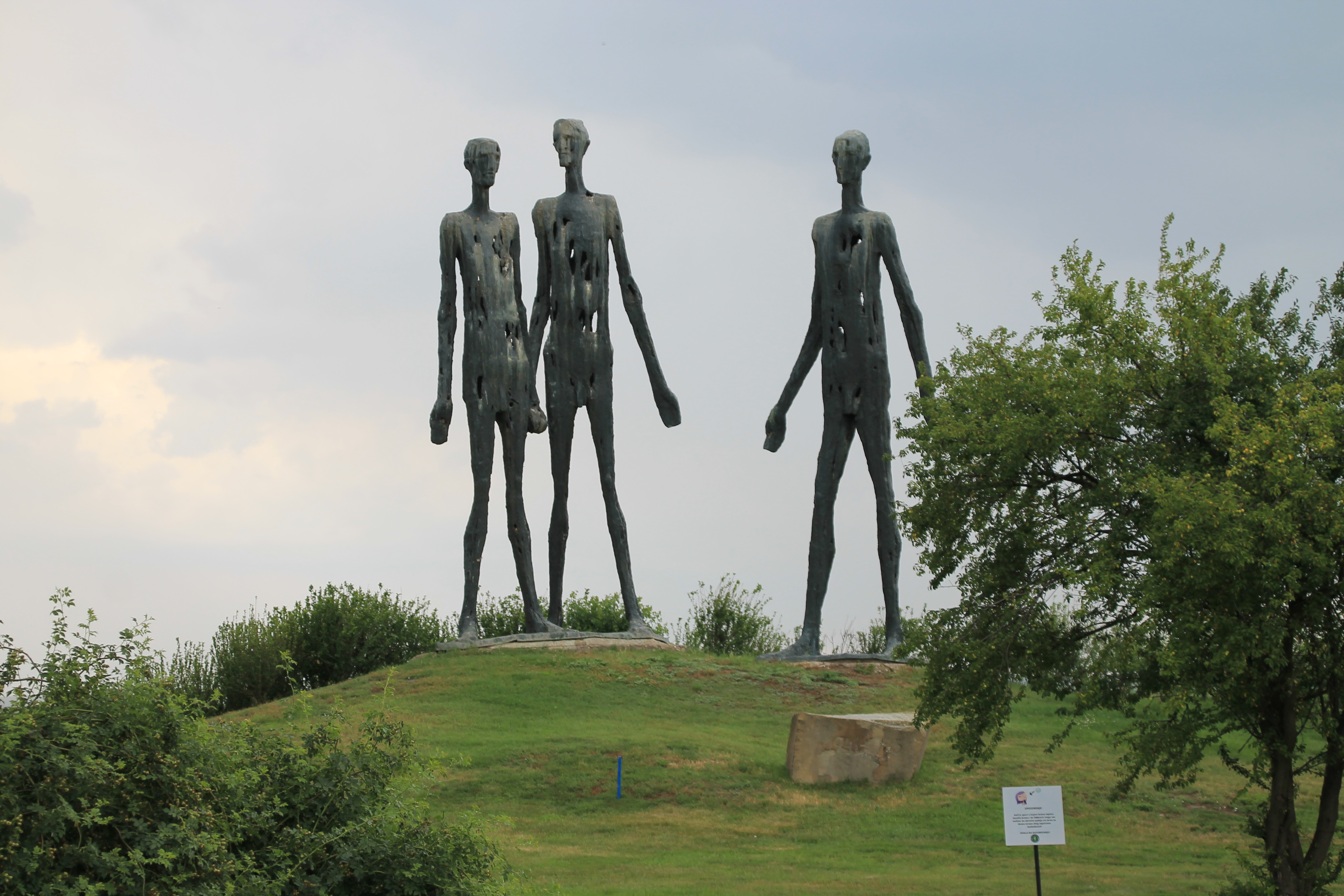
Crna Ćuprija, monument to the victims of the Novi Sad raid, near Žabalj.

During the four years of occupation, the Axis forces committed numerous war crimes against civilian population: about 50,000 people in Vojvodina were murdered and about 280,000 were arrested, violated or tortured. The victims belonged to several ethnic groups that lived in Vojvodina, but the largest number of the victims were Serbs, Jews and Romani people.

=== Total number of victims ===
According to historian Dragoljub Živković, approximately 55,000 civilians died in Vojvodina during the Axis occupation. Of those, approximately 17,000 were Jews.

According to demographer Slobodan Ćurčić, the total number of the people killed by the occupiers between 1941 and 1944 in the entire Vojvodina was 55,285, including:

- 18,193 people who were killed directly
- 19,004 people who were sent to concentration camps and killed there
- 4,168 people who were sent to forced labour and killed there
- 3,286 people who were mobilized and later killed
- 10,634 killed members of the resistance movement

=== Victims in Bačka ===
The total number of the killed people in Bačka was 19,573, including:

- 6,177 people who were killed directly
- 8,027 people who were sent to concentration camps and killed there
- 2,179 people who were sent to forced labour and killed there
- 1,516 people who were mobilized and later killed
- 1,674 killed members of the resistance movement

Of the total number of the victims (excluding the killed members of the resistance movement), 11,521 were men, 3,768 were women, 1,283 were elderly people, and 1,327 were children.

==== 1942 raid ====
The most notable war crime during the occupation was the mass murder of the civilians, mostly of Serb and Jewish ethnicity, performed by the Hungarian Axis troops in January 1942 raid in southern Bačka. Total number of civilians killed in the raid was 3,808, while places that were affected by the raid include Novi Sad, Bečej, Vilovo, Gardinovci, Gospođinci, Đurđevo, Žabalj, Lok, Mošorin, Srbobran, Temerin, Titel, Čurug and Šajkaš.

==== 1944 deportations of Jews ====
In March 1944 German units that occupied Horthy's Hungary entered Bačka and Gestapo men were with them. Without any delay the most cruel measures were introduced: the plunder of Jewish property was completed to be absolutely total; Jews had to wear the yellow mark; they were all confined to transit camps before very long to be taken, sometime in June 1944 first to Hungary and then to concentration camps in Austria and Germany. Most of them ended their journey in Auschwitz. Very few of them succeeded to survive and to return. Genocide in Bačka claimed a total of 14,000 Jewish victims. According to available data out of the Jewish victims of genocide 3,800 were from Banat, 11,000 from Serbia and about 260 from Sandžak. Out of about 82,000 members of the Jewish community in Yugoslavia only 15,000 survived World War II which means that 79,2% perished.

=== Victims in Banat ===
The total number of the killed people in Banat was 7,513, including:

- 2,211 people who were killed directly
- 1,294 people who were sent to concentration camps and killed there
- 1,498 people who were sent to forced labour and killed there
- 152 people who were mobilized and later killed
- 2,358 killed members of the resistance movement

Of the total number of the victims (excluding the killed members of the resistance movement), 4,010 were men, 631 were women, 243 were old people, and 271 were children.

=== Victims in Syrmia ===
The total number of the killed people in Syrmia was 28,199, including:

- 9,805 people who were killed directly
- 9,683 people who were sent to concentration camps and killed there
- 491 people who were sent to forced labour and killed there
- 1,618 people who were mobilized and later killed
- 6,602 killed members of the resistance movement

Of the total number of the victims (excluding the killed members of the resistance movement), 14,484 were men, 3,662 were women, 1,279 were old people, and 2,172 were children.

== Liberation struggle ==
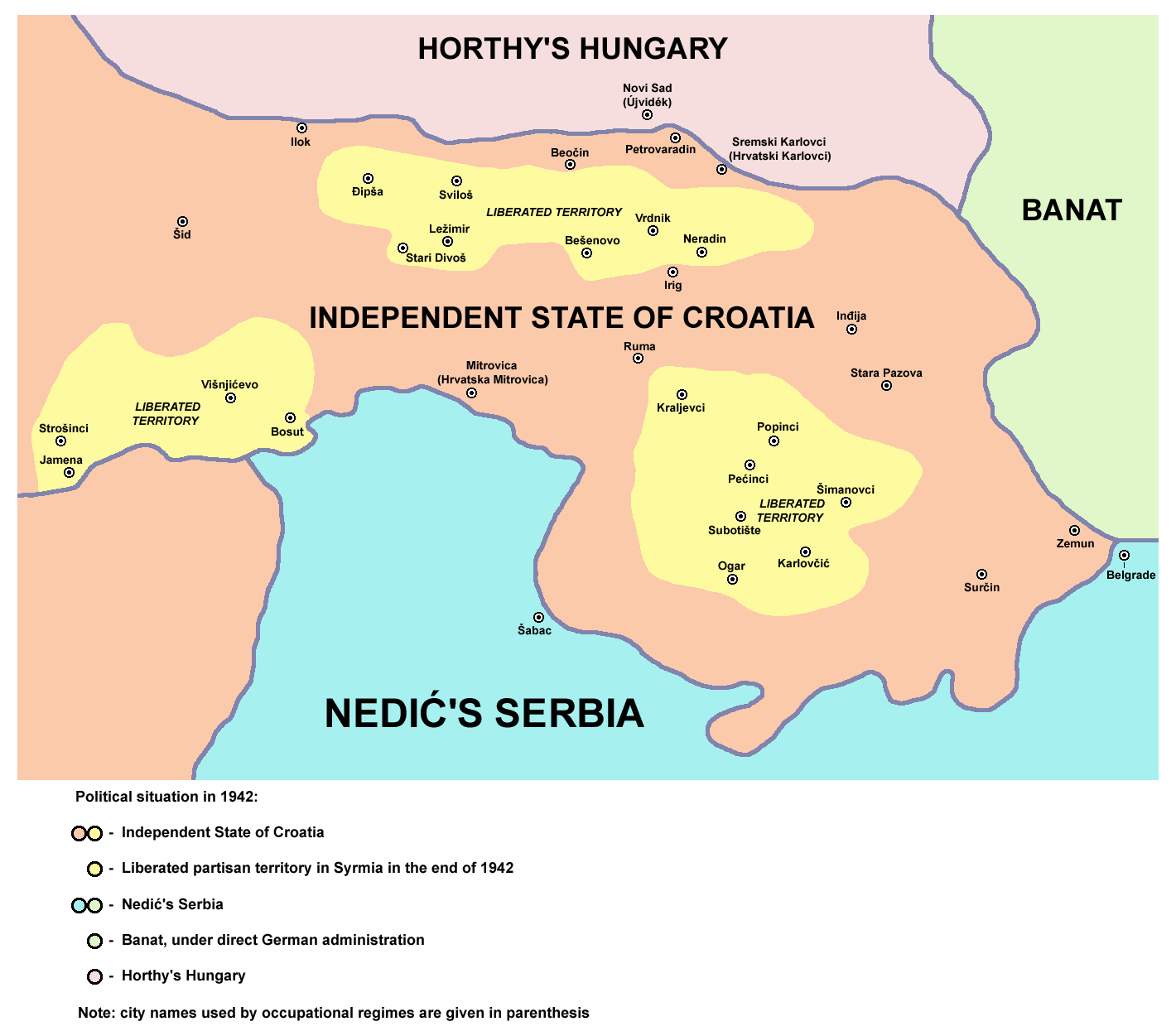
Liberated partisan territory in Syrmia in the end of 1942.

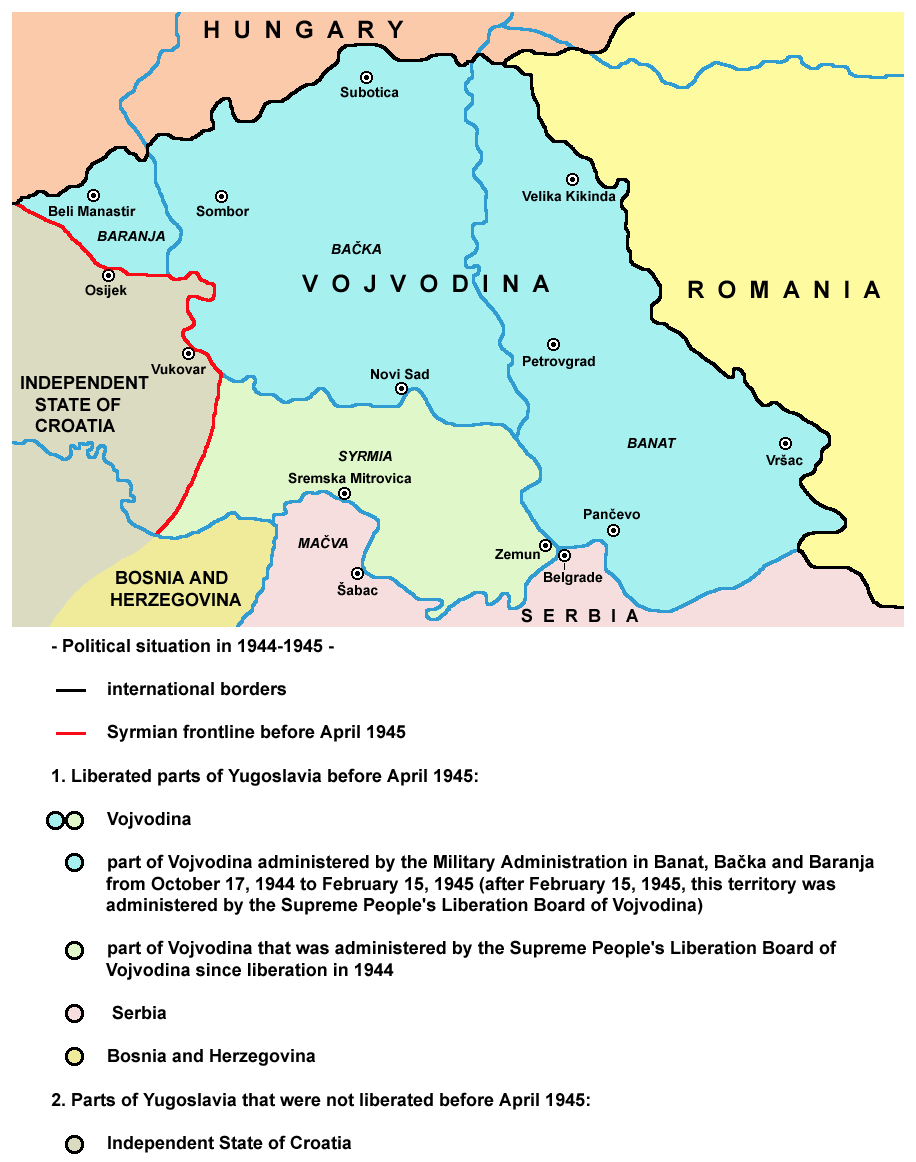
Syrmian frontline before April 1945.

The resistance movement against Axis occupation was started in summer of 1941 by the communists. The resistance in Banat and Bačka was soon defeated, while resistance in Syrmia had more success. The Syrmian resistance movement grew into a popular uprising, and a large liberated territory (that included about 40 villages) was established in Syrmia. On liberated territory, a partisan authority was organized, which included mass anti-fascist organizations, publishing activity, and education. The experiences of the resistance movement in Syrmia were transferred to Banat and Bačka in the summer of 1944; before the Soviet Red Army arrived in October 1944, Vojvodina already had its new institutions of people's administration. The liberation movement was organized into 18 Vojvodinian brigades divided into 3 squadrons. 15,000 fighters of the resistance movement were killed during the liberation struggle.

== See also ==
- Axis occupation of Serbia
- Greater Hungary
- Greater Croatia
- Independent State of Croatia
- Banat (1941–1944)
- 1944–1945 killings in Vojvodina
