= Vesna Stjepanović =

Serbian politician

Vesna Stjepanović (Serbian Cyrillic: Весна Стјепановић; born 29 October 1961) is a politician in Serbia. Formerly a member of the League of Social Democrats of Vojvodina (LSV), she has served in the National Assembly of Serbia since 2020 as a member of the Serbian Progressive Party.

== Private career ==
Stjepanović is a chemical technician. She lives in the village of Čurug in the municipality of Žabalj, in the province of Vojvodina.

== Political career ==
=== Municipal ===
Stjepanović was for many years a prominent local figure in the League of Social Democrats of Vojvodina. She sought election to the Žabalj municipal assembly in the 2008 Serbian local elections, which the LSV contested on the electoral list of the Democratic Party. She did not receive a mandate on this occasion.

The LSV fielded its own list in the 2012 local elections. Stjepanović received the third position and was elected when the list won five mandates. She was promoted to the second position in the 2016 local elections and was re-elected when the list won three mandates. During this time, she also served as president of the local community of Čurug and was a member of the presidency of the LSV Women's Forum in Žabalj.

Stjepanović subsequently left the LSV and contested the 2020 Serbian local elections as a candidate of the Progressive Party. She received the sixth position on the party's list and was elected to a third term when the list won fifteen mandates.

=== Member of the National Assembly ===
Stjepanović received the 112th position on the Progressive Party's Aleksandar Vučić — For Our Children list in the 2020 Serbian parliamentary election and was elected when the list won a landslide majority with 188 out of 250 mandates. She is now a member of the committee on human and minority rights and gender equality; a deputy member of the agriculture, forestry, and water management committee; a deputy member of the committee on education, science, technological development, and the information society; and a member of the parliamentary friendship groups with Argentina, Australia, Austria, Belgium, Brazil, Canada, China, Cuba, Denmark, Egypt, Greece, Israel, Italy, Japan, Kuwait, Malta, Mexico, the Netherlands, Portugal, Russia, Spain, Switzerland, Tunisia, Turkey, the United Arab Emirates, the United States of America, and Venezuela.
