= Novo Dovedan =

Serbian politician

Novo Dovedan (Serbian Cyrillic: Ново Доведан; born 26 April 1992) is a politician in Serbia. He has served in the Assembly of Vojvodina since 2020 as a member of the Serbian Progressive Party.

== Private career ==
Dovedan has a bachelor's degree in economics. He lives in Žabalj.

== Politician ==
=== Municipal politics ===
Dovedan became an assistant to the mayor of Žabalj in 2019. He subsequently received the thirteenth position on the Progressive Party's list for the municipality's assembly in the 2020 Serbian local elections and was elected when the list won a majority victory with fifteen out of twenty-one mandates.

=== Assembly of Vojvodina ===
Dovedan was given the thirty-first position on the Progressive Party's Aleksandar Vučić — For Our Children list in the 2020 Vojvodina provincial election and was elected when the list won a majority victory with seventy-six out of 120 mandates. It was noted in the Serbian media that he was one of the youngest MPs elected. He is now a member of the assembly committee on budget and finance and the committee on cooperation with national assembly committees in exercise of the competencies of the province.
