= Solin =

Town in Dalmatia, Croatia

- Town
- Grad Solin; Town of Solin
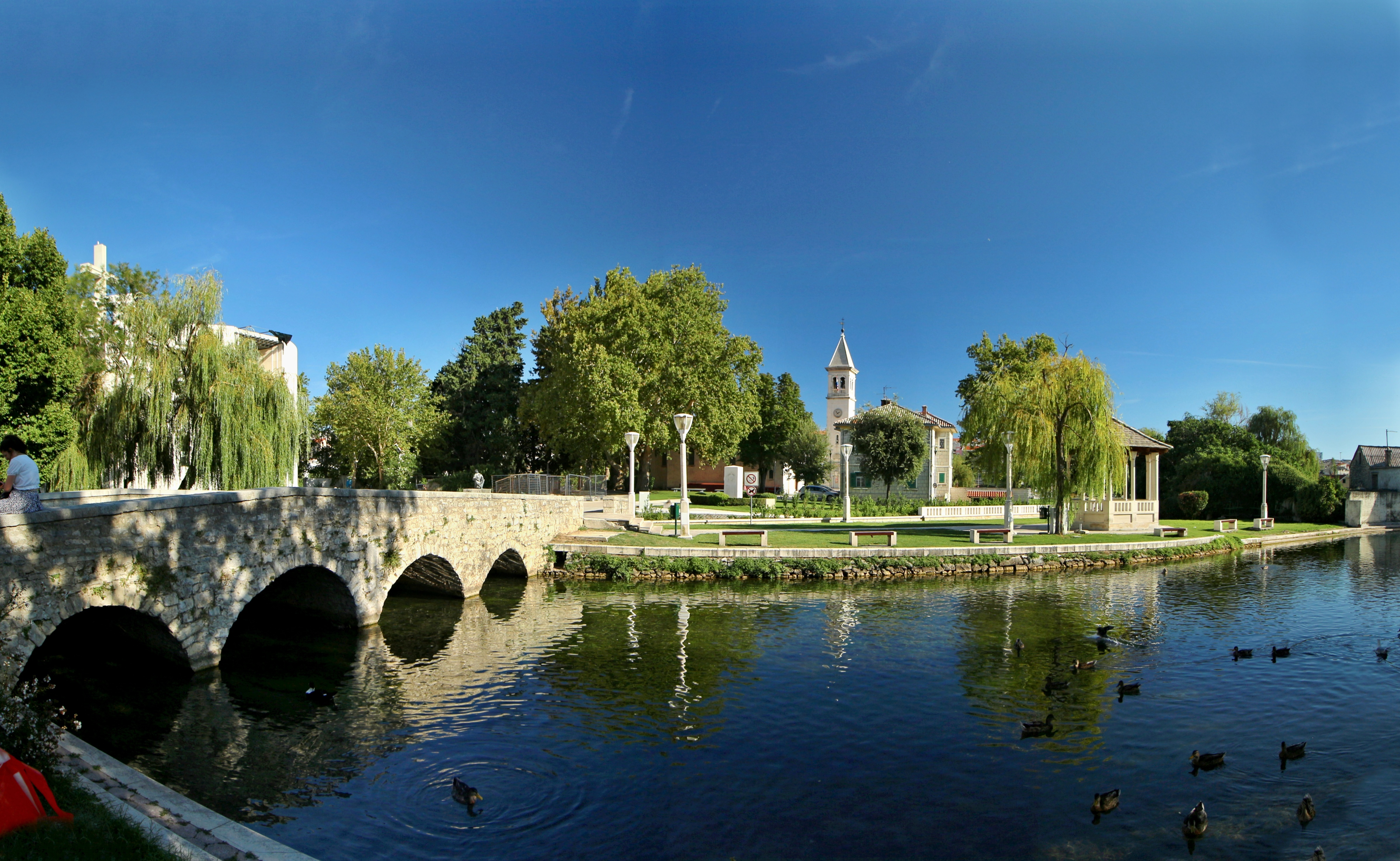
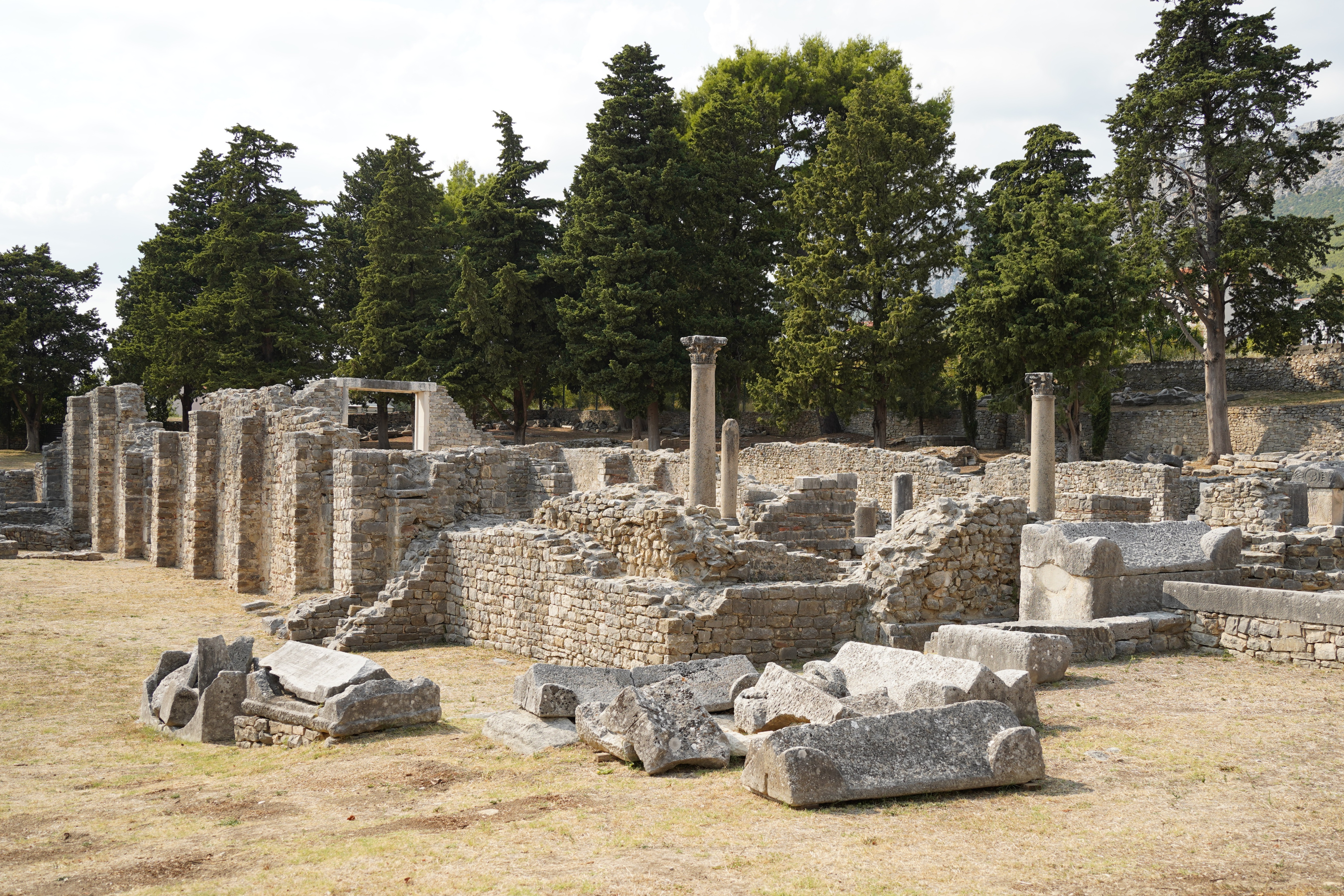
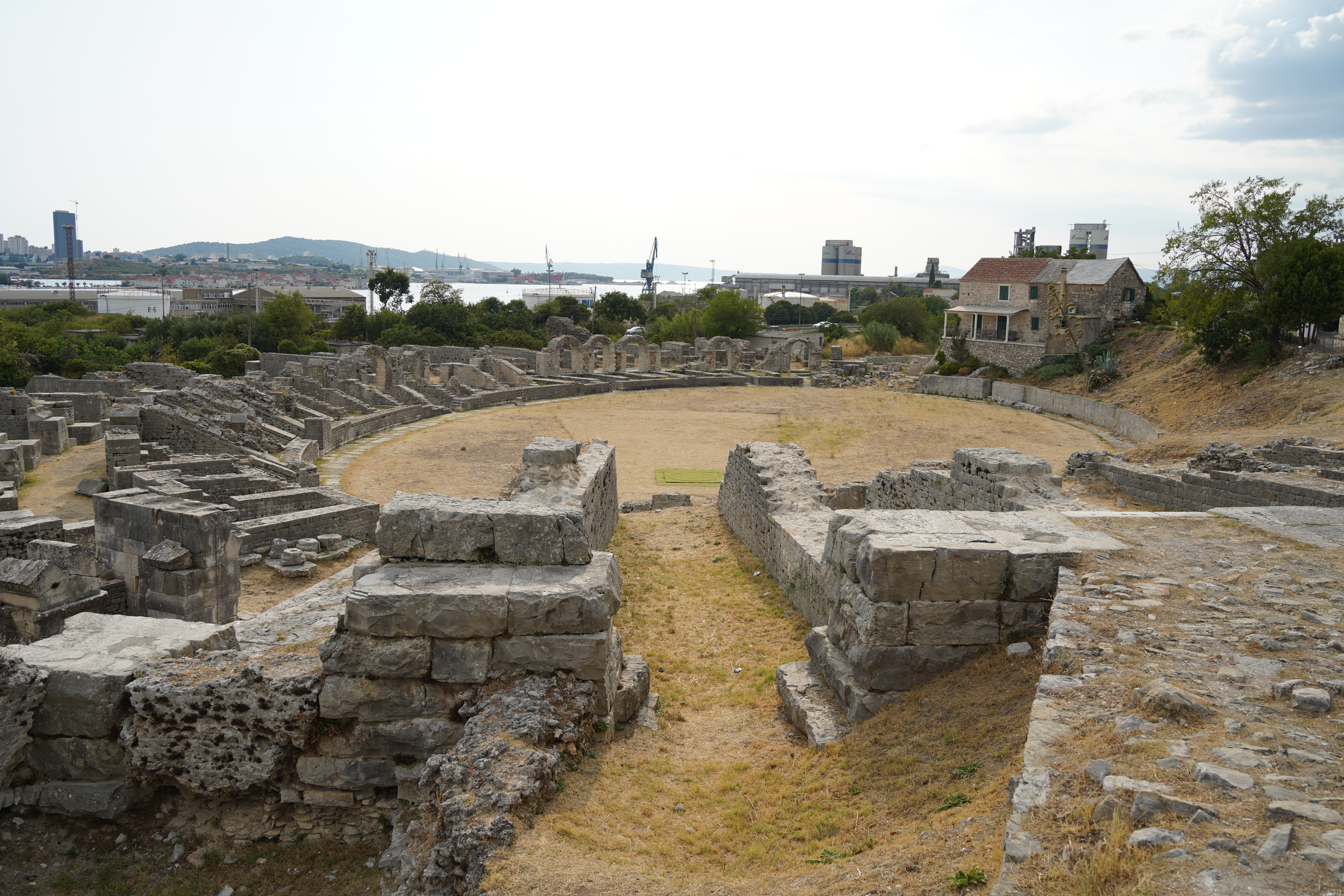
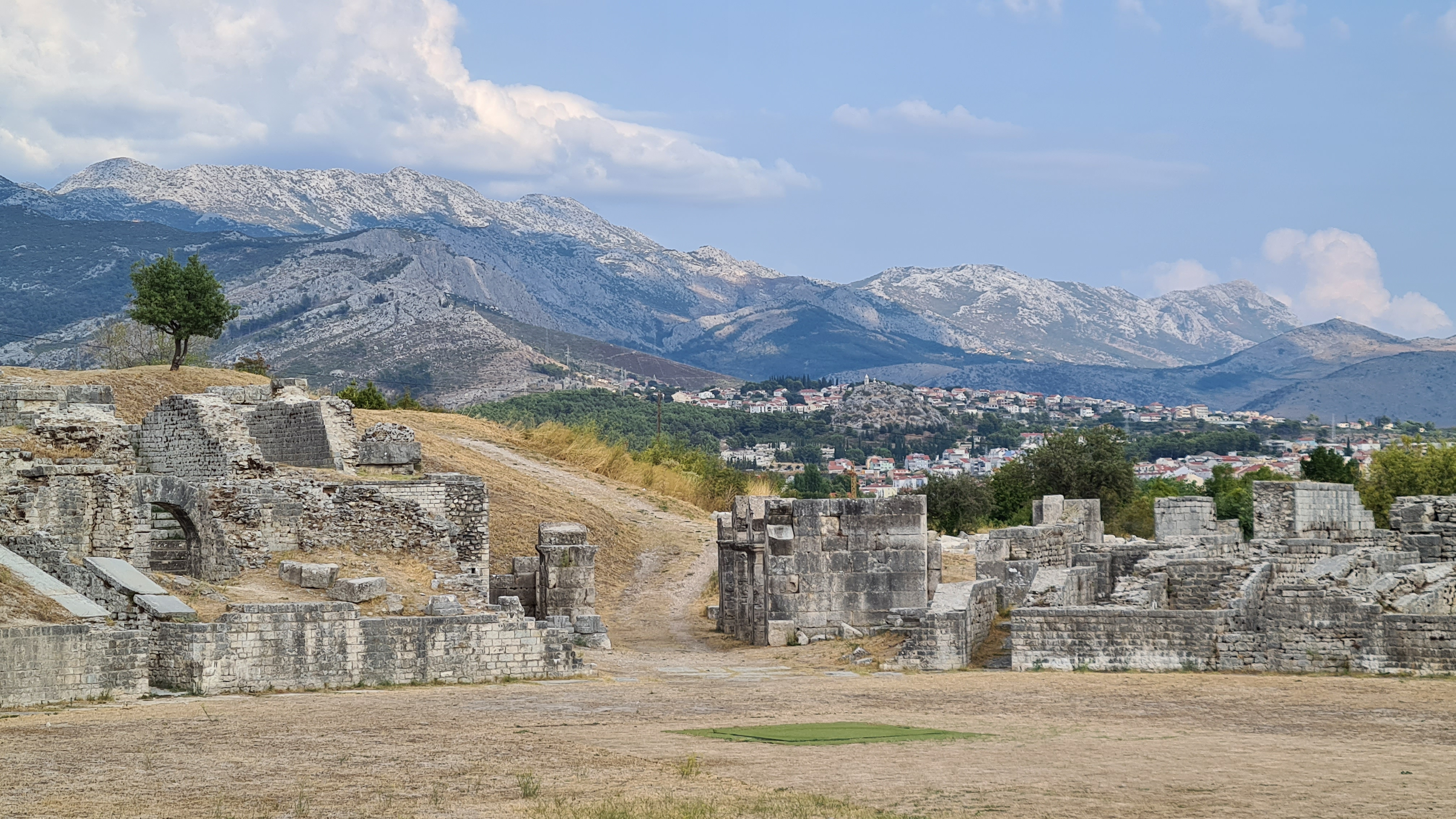
- Solin (Salona) with old Roman ruins

- Coat of arms
- Interactive map of Solin
- Location of Solin in Croatia
- Coordinates: 43.535°N 16.485°E
- Country: Croatia
- Region: Dalmatia
- County: Split-Dalmatia County

Government
  - Mayor: Dalibor Ninčević (HDZ)
  - City Council President: Dr. Zdravko Perko (HDZ)
  - City Council name: Gradsko Vijeće
  - No. of Council members: 19

Area
  - Town: 34.2 km^{2} (13.2 sq mi)
  - Urban: 11.4 km^{2} (4.4 sq mi)
- Elevation: 0 m (0 ft)

Population (2021)
  - Town: 24,862
  - Density: 727/km^{2} (1,880/sq mi)
  - Urban: 20,996
  - Urban density: 1,840/km^{2} (4,770/sq mi)
- Postal code: 21 210
- Area code: +385 (0)21
- Vehicle registration: ST
- Website: solin.hr

Solin is a town and a suburb of Split, in Split-Dalmatia county, Croatia. It is situated right northeast of Split, on the Adriatic Sea and the river Jadro.

Solin developed on the location of the ancient city of Salona, which was the capital of the Roman province of Dalmatia and the birthplace of Emperor Diocletian. After the arrival of Avars and Croats in the 7th-century, the town was destroyed, and its refugees moved to the settlement in and around Diocletian's palace, "Spalatum" (Split), turning it into a fortified town. In the Early Middle Ages, Solin was part of Croatian territory and played an important role in the Medieval Croatian state, being one of the political centres.

In the 20th century, the intensive industrialisation process of the Split basin made Solin no more than a suburb of Split. Today, with its independent municipal status, Solin is part of the Split conurbation, well connected with other towns. Lately, besides industry, tourism is being developed based on numerous archaeological sites and Solin's distinctive image that comes from many urban parks along the Jadro.

== Geography ==
Solin is situated north of the Split peninsula, in a basin surrounded by mountains Kozjak (779 m; 2,556 ft) to the north and Mosor (1,339 m; 4,393 ft) to the east. The ancient city of Salona developed near the estuary of Jadro, and the later medieval settlement was formed on one of the several islands formed by the river, which is where today's center is also situated.

The city covers an area of 18 km^{2} (7 sq mi), situated in the central part of the Split conurbation, eight kilometres (5 mi) north of Split, six kilometres (3.7 mi) east of Kaštela, 22 kilometres (14 mi) east of Trogir and four kilometres (2 mi) south of Klis. Residential and business parts of the city are located in the middle part of the river's flow, and on the gentle slopes that make the Solin basin. Industrial areas occupy a small valley of the upper basin of the Jadro, as well as large areas to the west of the center, on the easternmost tip of the bay of Kaštela where industrial and service port is situated. The ruins of the ancient Salona are located in the middle, to the west of today center.

== Climate ==
The climate is Mediterranean, with mild winters and hot summers. During the winter, a strong north-eastern wind Bura occurs frequently.

Solin's climate has mild differences between highs and lows, and there is adequate rainfall year-round. The Köppen Climate Classification subtype for this climate is "Csa" (Mediterranean climate).

Climate data for Solin, Croatia
Month	Jan	Feb	Mar	Apr	May	Jun	Jul	Aug	Sep	Oct	Nov	Dec	Year
Record high °C (°F)	17.4 (63.3)	22.3 (72.1)	23.2 (73.8)	27.7 (81.9)	33.2 (91.8)	38.1 (100.6)	38.6 (101.5)	38.1 (100.6)	34.2 (93.6)	27.9 (82.2)	25.8 (78.4)	18.1 (64.6)	38.6 (101.5)
Mean daily maximum °C (°F)	10.3 (50.5)	11.0 (51.8)	13.7 (56.7)	17.4 (63.3)	22.5 (72.5)	26.7 (80.1)	29.8 (85.6)	29.5 (85.1)	25.1 (77.2)	20.0 (68.0)	14.9 (58.8)	11.5 (52.7)	19.4 (66.9)
Daily mean °C (°F)	7.9 (46.2)	8.3 (46.9)	10.6 (51.1)	14.2 (57.6)	19.1 (66.4)	23.0 (73.4)	25.9 (78.6)	25.5 (77.9)	21.4 (70.5)	17.0 (62.6)	12.5 (54.5)	9.2 (48.6)	16.2 (61.2)
Mean daily minimum °C (°F)	5.4 (41.7)	5.5 (41.9)	7.6 (45.7)	10.8 (51.4)	15.2 (59.4)	18.8 (65.8)	21.6 (70.9)	21.5 (70.7)	18.1 (64.6)	14.1 (57.4)	9.9 (49.8)	6.0 (42.8)	12.9 (55.2)
Record low °C (°F)	−9.0 (15.8)	−8.1 (17.4)	−6.6 (20.1)	0.3 (32.5)	4.8 (40.6)	9.1 (48.4)	13.0 (55.4)	11.2 (52.2)	8.8 (47.8)	3.8 (38.8)	−4.5 (23.9)	−6.3 (20.7)	−9.0 (15.8)
Average precipitation mm (inches)	77.3 (3.04)	62.8 (2.47)	63.4 (2.50)	62.6 (2.46)	55.4 (2.18)	49.7 (1.96)	26.3 (1.04)	42.7 (1.68)	71.0 (2.80)	76.5 (3.01)	112.9 (4.44)	103.5 (4.07)	804.1 (31.65)
Average rainy days	11	10	10	9	9	9	6	5	7	9	12	12	109
Average snowy days	1	2	0	0	0	0	0	0	0	0	0	1	4
Mean monthly sunshine hours	131.5	147.9	186.8	217.2	273.0	307.4	350.3	324.8	247.3	196.9	130.6	119.3	2,633
Source 1: National Meteorological and Hydrological Service (Croatia)
Source 2: World Weather Information Service

=== Settlements ===
The administrative area of the city of Solin includes the following settlements:

- Blaca, population 3
- Kučine, population 1,082
- Mravince, population 1,717
- Solin, population 20,996
- Vranjic, population 1,064

In the vernacular, Solin is divided into eight neighbourhoods: Centar, Priko vode, Srednja strana, Sveti Kajo, Rupotina, Vranjic, Mravince and Kučine.

Town of Solin: Population trends 1857–2021
v

population	1878	2169	2203	2302	2862	3710	4017	5515	4402	4520	6298	11984	13980	15410	19011	23926	24862
	1857	1869	1880	1890	1900	1910	1921	1931	1948	1953	1961	1971	1981	1991	2001	2011	2021

Sources: Croatian Bureau of Statistics publications

== History ==
=== Ancient Salona ===
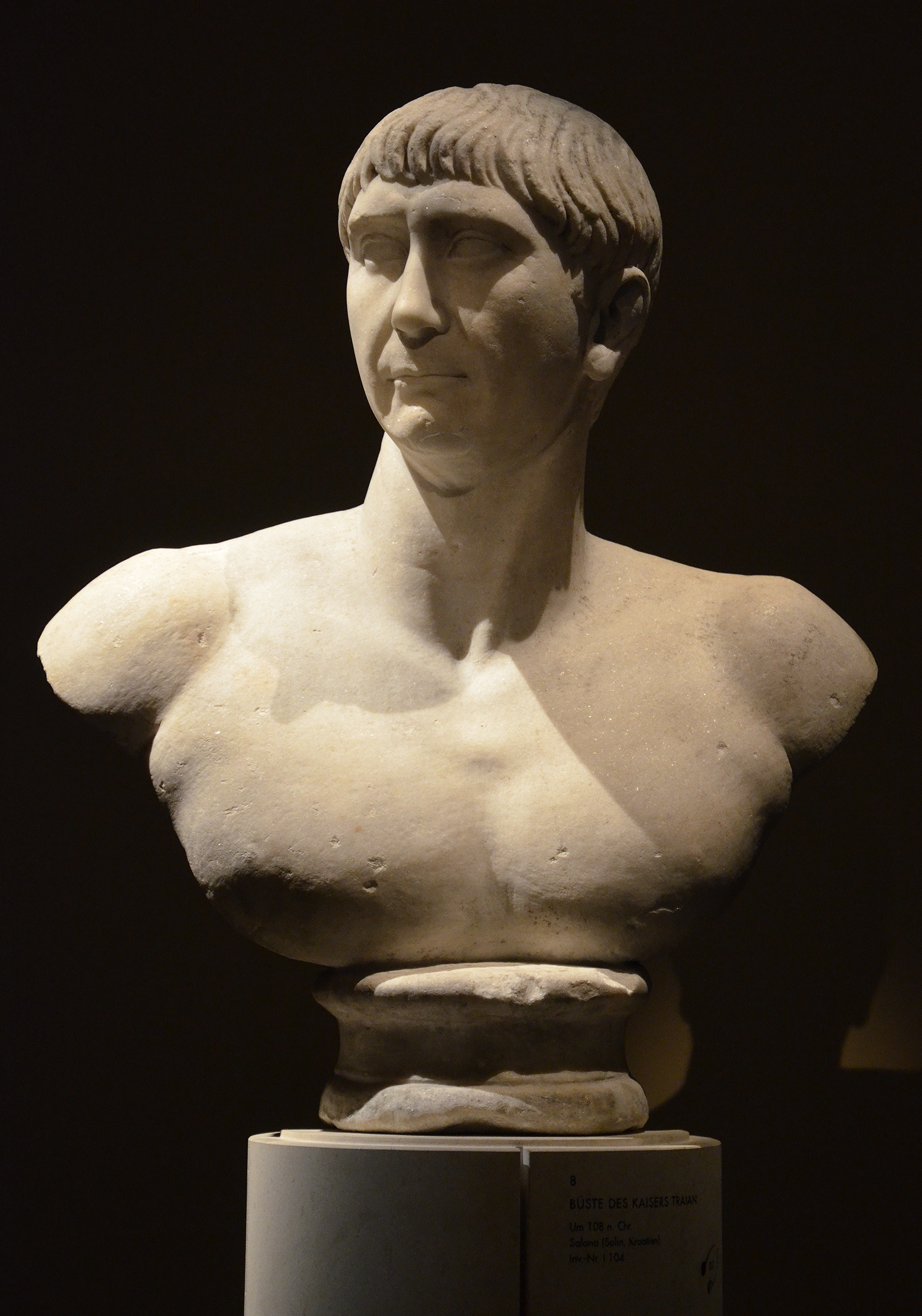
Bust of Trajan found in Salona, currently in Kunsthistorisches Museum, Vienna

In the late ancient times, Salona's importance was great both politically and religiously. It was the birthplace of Emperor Diocletian, who ruled the Roman Empire from 284 to 305 AD. He was born around 244, and served as a soldier and then a Roman army officer as a young man.

Salona was an early Roman settlement, which became overshadowed when Diocletian constructed the nearby Diocletian's Palace in about the year 300 AD. Surviving local residents of Salona, after the Avars retreated from those regions, to a settlement "Spalatum", today's (Split), at the location of Diocletian's Palace (probably around the middle 7th century AD). Christianity in Salona probably originated during the time of the apostles.

The Apostle Paul mentions that his pupil Apostle Titus traveled to Dalmatia so the assumption that he worked in Dalmatia's capital city of Salona, at least for a short time, is probable. That city, located on the Adriatic coast, with excellent sea connections with Italy and the Middle East, attracted Christian messengers of faith.

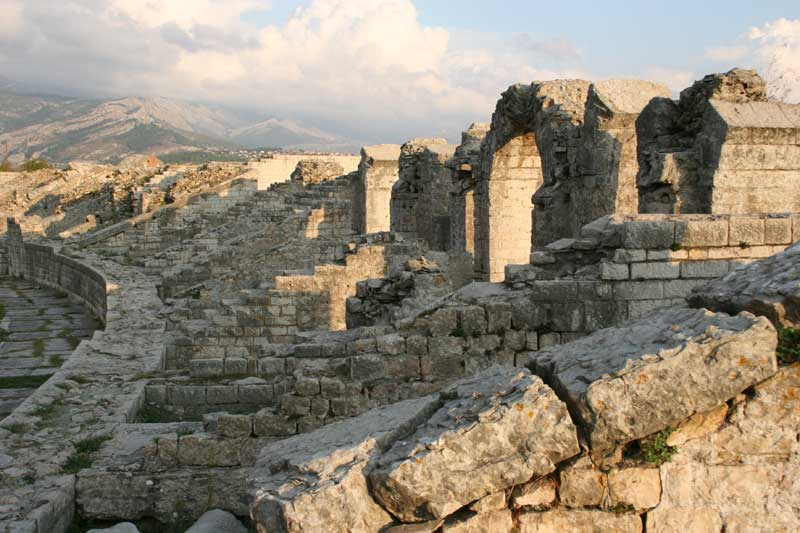
Ruins of the amphitheater of Solin

Salona had a well-organized Christian community with a bishop as leader ever since the middle of the 3rd century (bishop martyr Venantius lived at that time). Since the fourth century, Salona honored in its large basilicas its glorious martyrs from the times of Diocletian's persecution: St Domnius (Latin: Domnius; Croatian: Duje; Italian: Domnio), craftsman Anastasius the Fuller, deacon Septimia, priest Asteria, and others.

In the fifth Century, Salona's bishops started exercising more metropolitan duties (archbishop Hezihius), and in the sixth century they carried the archbishop title as well (arhiepiscopus), and fulfilled the duties associated with the title. (archbishops Stephen, Honorius and others). That means that at that time they held primary positions in western Illyria. Siscia's bishop from the region Pannonia joined the Dalmatian bishops on the synods held in Salona in the years 530 and 533 as a member with full rights. At the time of Diocletian, Salona had a population of 60,000.

In 639 Salona was destroyed by the Slavs. After the fall of Salona and the whole region under the Avarian rule (first quarter of 7th century), worship of Salona's martyrs was moved to Rome. Namely, Pope John IV ordered transportation of parts of their relics, which he placed in a dedicated chapel close to the Lateran baptistry. The images of those saints, which had been created in mosaic by the Pope's wish, can be found today in the apside of the chapel. Search for relics for Rome was probably the incentive for Salona residents who inhabited the new city of Split, located only a few kilometers from the abandoned Salona. At the very least, they wanted to bring to Split the bones of their most important protectors: St. Domnius and St. Anastasius. They placed them in what was once Diocletian's mausoleum, which was subsequently converted into the Cathedral of Saint Domnius.

=== Middle Ages ===
In the 9th century, Duke Trpimir I of Croatia built a Benedictine monastery between Klis and Solin. Inscriptions dated to 852 from there are first known written record of the name of Croats in modern-day Croatian territory.

In the 10th century, Queen Helen (Jelena) had built two churches by the Jadro: the Church of St. Stephen and the Church of St. Mary. The Church of St. Stephen was the burial place of a number of Croatian kings along with other nobility, It was destroyed by the Ottoman Turks in the 16th century. The nearby Church of Saint Mary was the burial site of Mihajlo Krešimir II and his wife Jelena, the benefactress.

In the 11th century, the Church of Saint Peter and Moses (known today as "hollow church") was built north of Solin, near the two churches of Saint Mary and Stephen, in which Demetrius Zvonimir was crowned as king of Dalmatia and Croatia.

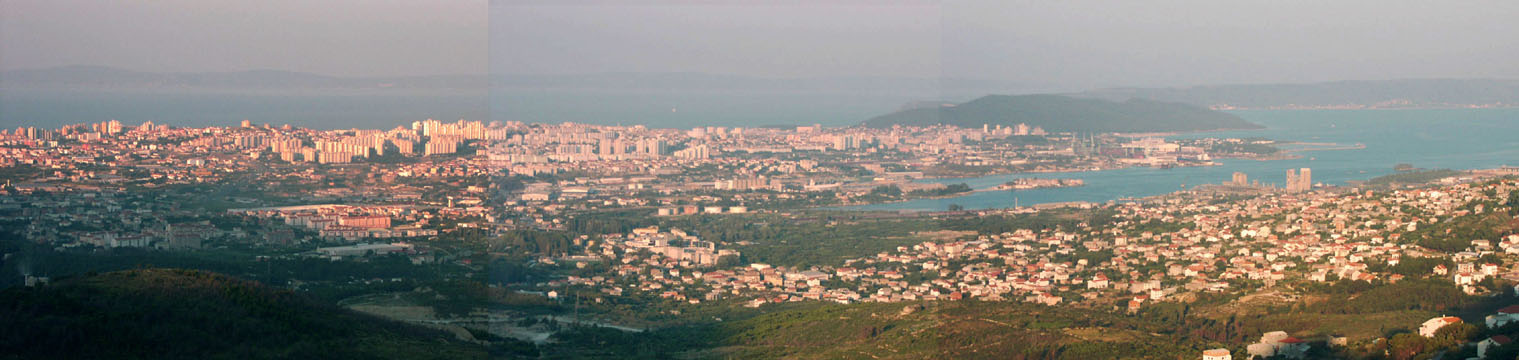
View of the Split conurbation (with Solin in the foreground) from Klis

== Demography ==
As of 2021, Solin has 24,862 inhabitants, 49.01% of them being male and 50.09% being female.

== Transport ==
Solin is situated on the D8 (E65) Adriatic road ("Jadranska magistrala"), that becomes a 4-lane "Split bypass road" here and continues south towards Split and further down the Adriatic coast. A big roundabout south of the city centre is a major intersection with a D1 (E59) road that connects the area of Split conurbation with the A1 Zagreb-Split highway.

The Zagreb-Split railway passes through the city territory. Although there is a train station in Solin (2 km (1 mi) to the west of the city centre), only regional trains stop here. Regional rail transport is to be intensified because of the Split Suburban Railway project.

Split Airport (SPU) in Kaštela is situated 15 km (9 mi) to the west of Solin, well-connected by roads and local transport.

Public transport is organized by several bus lines operated by the Promet Split company, which provides public transport for the Split conurbation. These routes are:

- #1 Starine (Solin) - HNK (Split)
- #2 Kaštel Sućurac - Trajektna luka (Split)
- #5 Dračevac (Solin) - HNK (Split)
- #10 Japirko (Solin) - Trajektna luka (Split)
- #13 Kolodvor Sukoišanska (Split) - Dračevac (Solin)
- #16 Ninčevići (Solin) - HNK (Split)
- #22 Rupotina (Solin) - HNK (Split)
- #32 Kolodvor Sukoišanska (Split) - Kučine (Solin)

Local bus lines from Split to Kaštela, Trogir, Klis and Sinj also stop in Solin centre.

== Industry ==
In the 1980s, production departments of the Jugoplastika started working in Solin. In the 1990s, Jugoplastika became AD Plastik, which became biggest manufacturer of vehicle plastics in Croatia.
