= Lazar Paču =

Serbian politician

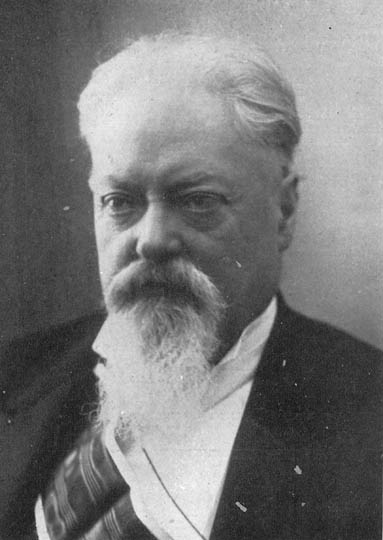
- Paču as Minister of Finance
- Born: 1 March 1855; Čurug, Austrian Empire
- Died: 12 October 1915 (aged 60); Vrnjci, Kingdom of Serbia
- Citizenship: Serbian
- Occupations: economist, politician

Lazar Paču (Serbian Cyrillic: Лазар Пачу; 1 March 1855 – 12 October 1915) was a Serbian doctor and politician, serving as the Minister of Finance multiple times.

== Biography ==
Lazar Paču was of Aromanian descent. He came from a family who moved from the south to the Austrian Empire with Arsenije III Čarnojević, from Blaca . His father Stefan was a priest in the small town of Čurug, and his mother was related to Miloš Cvetić, a well-known drama writer and actor. He finished high school in Novi Sad and started medical studies in Zurich, where he joined the Bacunin's circle. It can be said that in that period he had very strong anarchist ideas. There he also met Svetozar Marković, Vasa Pelagić and the future leadership of the Radical Party: Nikola Pašić, Pero Todorović and Petar Velimirović. He also met Lenka Zaho, whom he later married in Belgrade. In those years, he especially liked to read articles and books related to the economy. He read a lot of works, all related to economics, and they helped him a lot in the further development of his career. He took a break from studies in 1878. Together with Pero Todorović, he came to Novi Sad and founded the newspaper Straza (Guardian). But the Austrian authorities closed the paper down and expelled Paču from the city. Paču went back to his medical studies by enrolling at the medical faculty in Berlin where he wrote a doctoral dissertation on rheumatic diseases. In 1880 he opened a doctor's office in Belgrade. Later, he participated in the founding of the People's Radical Party in 1881 and became a member of it. He wrote for the Radical Party's official newspaper Samouprava (Self-government).

When the Radicals came to power in 1889 and nationalized monopolies of tobacco and salt, he was appointed as head of state monopolies. There he worked until 1898. After the successful rehabilitation of this important state institution, Paču became the head of the Belgrade Cooperative Society with the aim to stabilize the national currency—the dinar. In 1896 he retired as a member of the Belgrade Municipal Assembly.

== Political career ==
Somewhere between the late 19th- to the very early 20th- century, the top of the Radical Party was the triumvirate of the three, Nikola Pašić, Stojan Protić and Paču. Nikola Pašić was a Serbian and Yugoslav politician and diplomat who was the most important Serbian political figure for almost 40 years. Also, he was the undisputed leader of the party who, it is said, "could" make a political agreement with just anybody. Stojan Protić was a Serbian politician and writer. He served as the prime minister of the Kingdom of Serbs, Croats, and Slovenes between 1918 and 1919, and again in 1920. And Lazar Pachu was "a good speaker and thinker, but he was not a radical person," and hence a bit politically harmless. Everyone in Serbia said that he was an incredibly honest, generous and worthy man. It was no surprise that Nikola Pašić appointed Pachu as minister of finance after the May Coup in 1903. For the next ten years, Pachu was Serbia's government economist in three Radical Party administrations.

He was self-taught in banking and took over the portfolio of Minister of Finance at a time when no one wanted to approve the country's credits, due to the country's economic situation and the assassination of Alexander Obrenovic. With harsh monetary measures, financial discipline, and above all, well-conducted negotiations, he managed to balance the budget first and then restore the confidence of European countries. Prior to Pachu, it was a serious task to secure funding for new political plans. In those years, Serbia was preparing for "major historical affairs", as it was necessary to arm and expand the railway network. Due in part to Dr. Paču's policy decisions, Serbia was better prepared economically for the upcoming Great War. Because of a policy of paying back any debt (even to enemies), Serbia was able to take out loans to cover the costs of increased military spending in World War I. He was a Freemason.

== Pig War (1906–08) ==
The Pig War lasted from 1906 to 1908. Serbian agriculture paid a high price for economic independence. Austro-Hungary has closed its borders for Serbian cattle, allegedly because of infection. This prohibition also included the border of Serbia with Bosnia and Herzegovina, then under the Austro-Hungarian protectorate. From the blockade, Serbia got stronger both politically and financially. Historians point out that everything was subordinated to foreign currency: The market price of Serbian securities in the year 1904 was constantly increasing. Pachu noted that Serbian securities on loans with 4% interest between February and November in 1904 increased from 68.73 to 79.55 dinars (by ~10 dinars of nominal), and bonds on a loan of 5% jumped from 79.65 to 89.40 dinars. This was a positive consequence of the increase in the income of the Independent Monopoly Administration, and especially of the Serbian Railways business (the most lucrative loans were based on it), which in 1904 marked an income of 8.5 million, compared to the previous year of 6.8 million dinars.

Moreover, Lazar Paču found new markets for Serbia that earned a profit by attracting foreign capital to Belgrade, mostly French. As a result of this, the French-Serbian Bank was opened. The market for Serbian goods, mostly livestock, is found in Belgium, Germany, France, and even Egypt. The trade of foreign goods increased by 100% (in 1912 it amounted to the entire 200 million dinars in gold). By financial discipline and innate claim, Lazar Paču managed to cover the state budget of 103 million golden dinars in 1909.

In Vienna, this was considered a miracle. Serbia was offered loans from all sides. Pachu acknowledged only money with a gold cover. In the time of the Balkan wars, there was no budget deficit - experts say that such a case was not recorded in the history of banking and the history of warfare. During his financial reign, Serbian money became convertible. At one point he has beaten a highly respected French franc currency. The golden franc was worth less than a golden dinar.

In addition to new measures in customs and taxation policy, at the very beginning of the ministry, Paču launched a new nickel-plated five dinar with the image of Black George or Karadjordje and King Peter and a new metal coins.

== Public finances of the Kingdom of Serbia before the First World War ==
One of the most complicated problems that Serbia faced immediately after gaining independence at the Berlin Congress was finances - financing primarily its own state, but also debts incurred during the liberation wars against Turkey and assumed obligations under the treaty of July 13, 1878. Serbia during the wars of 1876-78 settled its modest budget from only two types of tax - personal and property so that the rapid increase in government liabilities required an urgent reform of the entire financial system, and above all fiscal policy. In addition, Serbia inherited the obligations of High Port to the Austro-Hungarian Empire and the Railway Company in the European part of Turkey - i.e. to build new ones and to complete and link the started routes within the boundaries over which it gained sovereignty.

The year 1881 not only marked the change in the conduct of Serbia's financial policy but also the beginning of its full economic (and political) attachment to Austro-Hungarian, through Lazar Paču. Namely, for the sake of dynastic interests and obtaining the royal title, the "Secret Convention" was signed on June 28, which established as Austro-Hungarian protectorate over Serbia. However, by the circumstance, the first Serbian foreign loan was concluded in March 1881 with a consortium of French banks through the Société Générale from Paris for the construction of the Belgrade-Vranje railway line in the amount of 100 million dinars, with a repayment period of 50 years and an annual interest rate of 5%. The repayment of the loan was guaranteed by Serbia with pure income from railways and customs, and if funds were insufficient, the annual annuity would be supplemented by funds collected from personal taxes. Immediately after that Serbia signed with the same creditor so-called a "lottery loan" in the amount of 33 million golden dinars, with a 3% interest rate and a repayment period until 1938. The loan was intended for the payment of debts to Russia in the amount of 30 million dinars, which she claimed from Serbia to finance its wars against Turkey in the period 1876-78.

A significant moment in the settlement of financial opportunities in the country was the establishment of the Privileged National Bank of the Kingdom of Serbia in 1884. The Bank was established as a joint-stock company with an initial capital of 20 million dinars, allocated to 40,000 shares with a nominal value of 500 dinars. The buyout was given to domestic private equity holders, which they gave to the public as a surprise.

From 1881 to 1895 Lazar Paču concluded 13 large (long-term) loans in the total amount of about 323 million dinars and a number of smaller, so-called "flying" (short-term) loans, the value of which exceeded 32 million dinars total external debt amounted to over 355 million dinars. Since, due to indebtedness, virtually nothing could be given as a security for obtaining new loans, foreign creditors made the conversion of state debts so-called "Carlsbad Protocol", and thus saved Serbia from total bankruptcy. With this arrangement, all state revenues (primarily railway revenues, monopolies on tobacco, petroleum and customs revenues) were placed under the control of foreign creditors, while the entire public debt of the country was converted to the amount of 355,292,000 French francs in gold, with a repayment period until 1974 and at an interest rate of 4%.

On the foreign trade plan, the exchange with the Habsburg monarchy reached a peak - 90% of the total Serbian exports (mainly agricultural products of raw material character) went to the Austro-Hungarian market, while 60% of imports (finished industrial products - factory) came from it. The total value of foreign trade amounted to more than 120 million dinars in 1901. However, above all, the inclusion of Serbia in international flows and the exchange of goods and capital was running very slowly. Due to the almost absolute reference to the dominant Austro-Hungarian market, capitalism in Serbia at the beginning of the 20th century remained at the level of the "agrarian pendant".

The arrival of Karadjordjevic as the head of Serbia after the "May coup" marked a change in the course of the conduct of politics, both on the internal and the external plan. The priority task of the new regime which was introduced by Lazar Pachu was to "heal the sick finances" by fostering national savings, devising credit policies, reforming state accounting, parliamentary oversight of budget items, and general directions for the development of the overall economic activity. The presence of French and English capital was becoming increasingly felt in the financing of railroad construction, mining, trade, and the establishment of mixed banking institutions.

== Budgetary measures ==
The Ministry of Finance already in the first year of operation, despite the increase in budget expenditures, immediately implied a budget surplus of more than 6.3 million dinars. Dr. Milorad Nedeljković points out an almost sharp increase in tax cuts, on average by 40%. In 1904, taxpayers of Serbia paid 75% of the permanent state surplus, 25% for schools, 7% for railway, 5% for military buildings, 5% for overhaul, 5% for personnel and 4% for gendarmerie. Hence, the taxpayers in 1904, paid another 166 dinars in tax breaks. Pachu explained in the National Assembly that this "one-year 40% offset" becomes "one heavy victim" to put in order Serbian finances. Next, in 1905, cuts were abolished, but taxes or tax bases were increased, so the total burden remained unchanged.

The second measure of Paču, which is important for balancing the state budget, was the law that the state may owe national banks up to 10 million dinars per year until foreign creditors received income from the Independent Monopoly Administration (which remained only half as much) year and did not reach the surplus of their income. Thus, the "seasonal" problem of the lack of sufficient budget revenues in the first half of the year was eliminated, which was a higher amount than that the government could not issue treasury bills in excess of six million dinars (and at that time, budget expenditures amounted to over 20 million already in the first half of the year).

The third way in which budget revenues were increased was a significant increase in customs revenues and an increase in excise tax on monopolized products (and 40% of excise cuts were introduced here). Only from the price of tobacco and petroleum prices, in 1904, Paču earned 1.5 million dinars more of state revenues than in the previous year.

Paču's budget and monetary policy made it possible to increase the circulation of gold bills in Serbia to over four million dinars, which has never happened before. The demand for banknotes with golden covers was so strong that the Privileged National Bank completely exhausted all the printed quantities of these banknotes - and so it was in the following years

== Death ==
In the summer of 1914, Dr. Paču was the first to receive an Austrian protest note on the occasion of the Sarajevo assassination, which he handed over to absent Pašić. On 23 July, Ministry of Foreign Affairs Baron Gizl presented the Austro-Hungarian ultimatum to the Serbian authorities, including Pachu, with a 48-hour deadline. The instruction from Foreign Minister Count von Berchtold was to leave the country immediately and the Serbian government should not accept all the points of the ultimatum. The reply was delivered by the Serbian Prime Minister Pasic five minutes before the deadline expired on 25 July. As the Serbian government did not accept all the points, Gizl declared that diplomatic relations were broken off and left on a train half an hour later. On 28 July 1914, Austria-Hungary formally declared war on Serbia. During the summer of 1915, while Lazar Pachu worked as Finance Minister of the Serbian government in Nis, he became ill. In June, after doctors removed a stone from his bladder, he fell into bed. Due to the need for immediate recovery after the operation, he lived for a month in Vrnjci. In Vrnjacka Banja, he died two months later, in October 1915, and there he was buried. His body was later transferred to the New Cemetery in Belgrade.

== Anecdotes ==
During the turbulent years in the Balkans, King Peter needed 200,000 dinars. Accordingly, he sent his trusted man to demand payment of his royal salary in advance. Dr. Paču listened to the King's Secretary and resolutely refused his request. He justified this decision by saying that if the king abdicated or died, he would not be able to repay that debt, so he advised the king to seek a loan from commercial banks.

Government offices
Preceded by Sava Grujić	Minister of Finance of Serbia; 1904–1905	Succeeded by Milan Marković
Preceded by Vladimir Todorović	Minister of Finance of Serbia; 1906–1908	Succeeded by Mihailo M. Popović
Preceded by Jovan P. Jovanović	Minister of Finance of Serbia; 1912–1915	Succeeded by Vojislav D. Marinković
