= Blaca =

Blaca may refer to:

- Blaca, Serbia, a hamlet near Tutin
- Blaca, Croatia, a hamlet near Solin
- Blaca hermitage, a hermitage on Brač island, Split-Dalmatia County, Croatia
