= Kučine =

Kučine may refer to:

- Kučine, Bosnia and Herzegovina, a village near Goražde
- Kučine, Croatia, a village near Solin
