= Crna Ćuprija =

WWII monument in Serbia

Coordinates: 45°23′31″N 20°11′28″E

- Црна Ћуприја
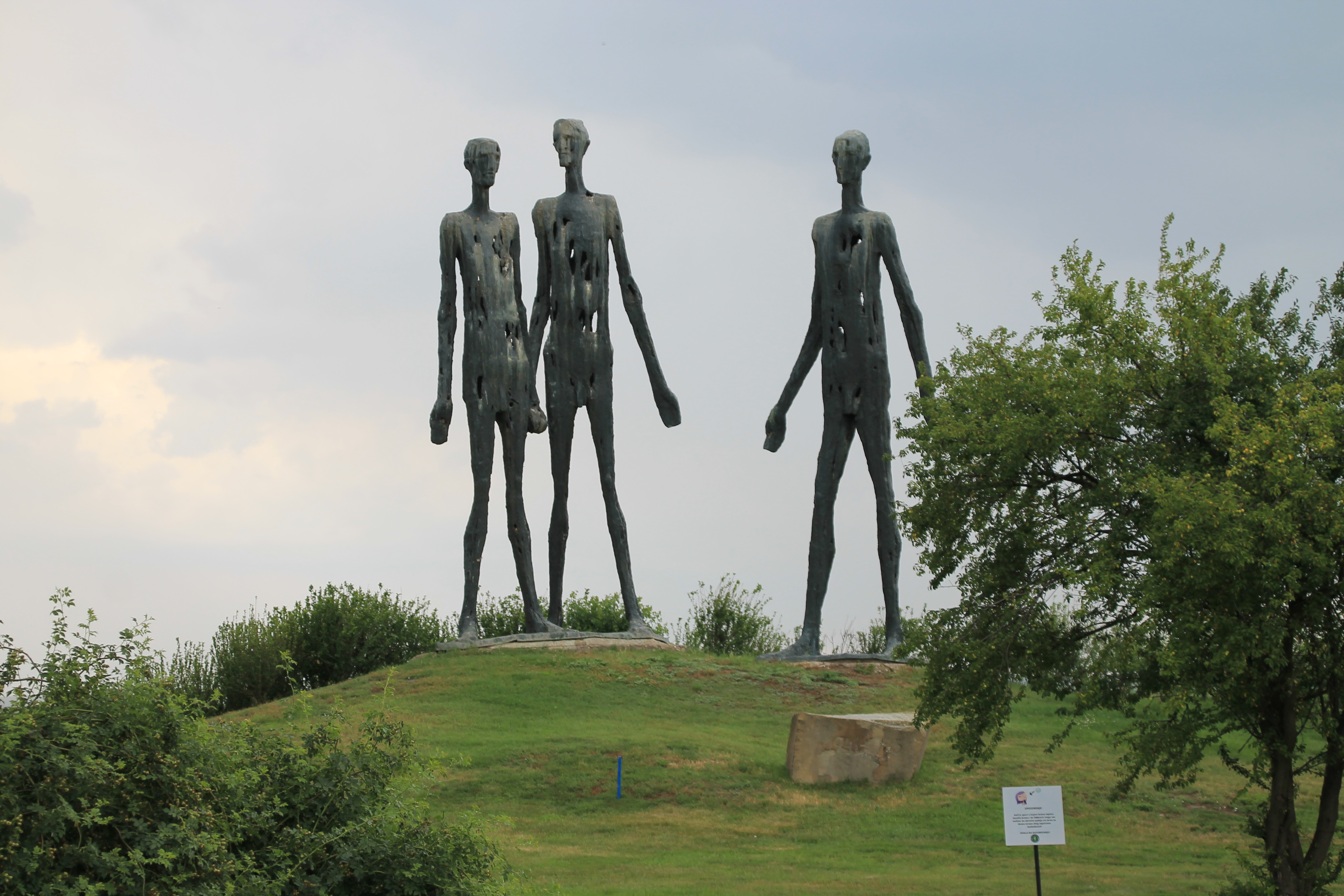
- Crna Ćuprija monument
- Interactive map of Crna Ćuprija
- Location: Žabalj, Serbia
- Designer: Jovan Soldatović
- Type: Memorial
- Height: 9 meters (30 ft)
- Opening date: 1962
- Dedicated to: Novi Sad raid victims of Žabalj

Crna Ćuprija (Serbian: Crna Ćuprija, Serbian Cyrillic: Црна Ћуприја, lit. 'Black Bridge'), is a World War II monument in Serbia. It stretches across an area of 472 ha (1,170 acres), and it is located 10 km (6.2 mi) from Žabalj near the Tisa River, on the road from Novi Sad to Zrenjanin. The monument was designed by Jovan Soldatović in 1962. At a height of 9 meters (30 ft), the sculptures are dedicated to the victims of the Novi Sad raid killed near Žabalj by fascist Hungarian forces occupying Yugoslavia in January 1942. The memorial is listed as one of the Historic Landmarks of Great Importance in Serbia.

Part of the monument was stolen in 2009.

== See also ==
- Axis occupation of Vojvodina
- List of Yugoslav World War II monuments and memorials in Serbia
