= Čurug =

Čurug: Чуруг (Serbian); Csúrog (Hungarian)
- Village (Selo)
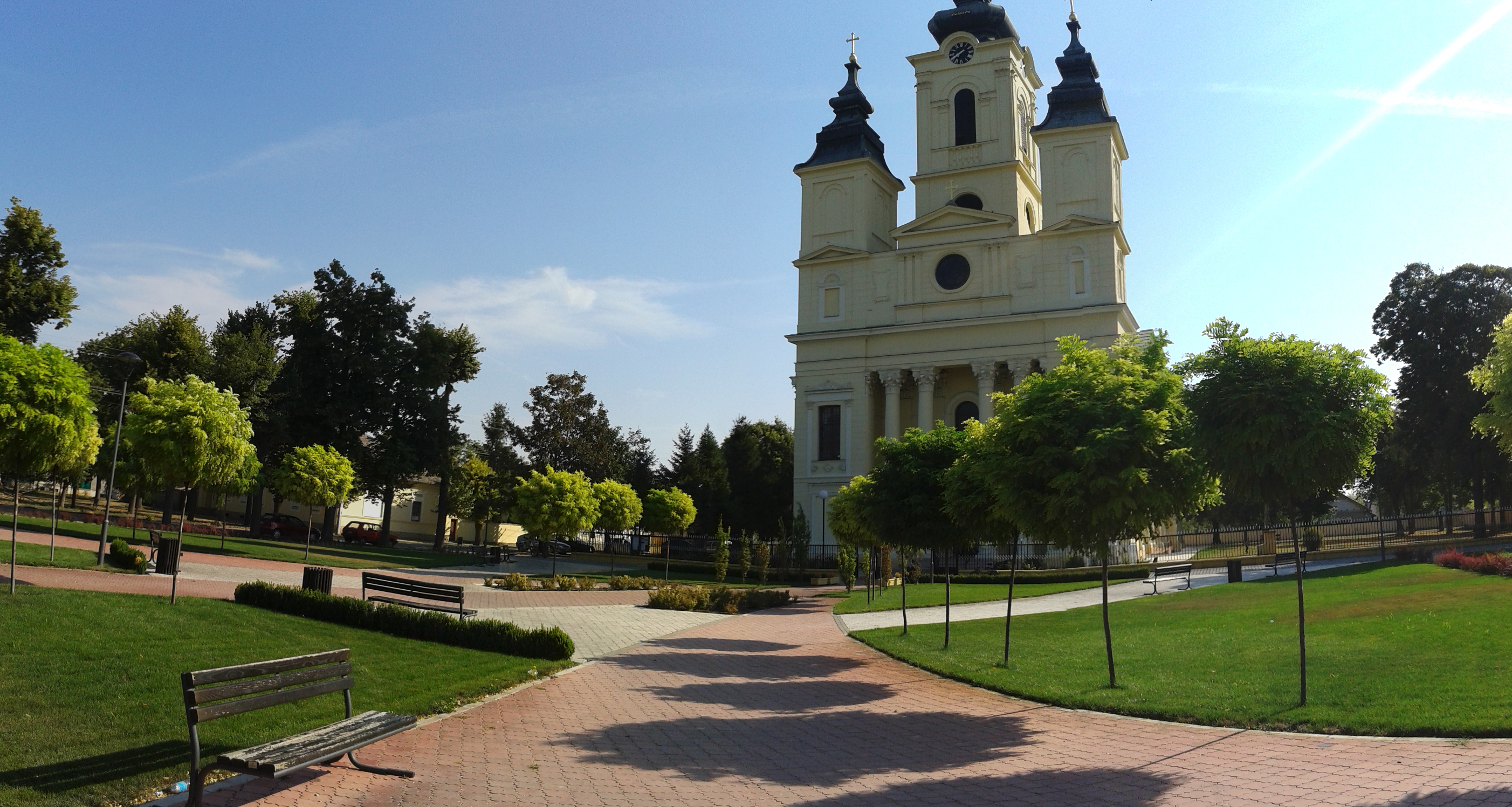
- Čurug, center

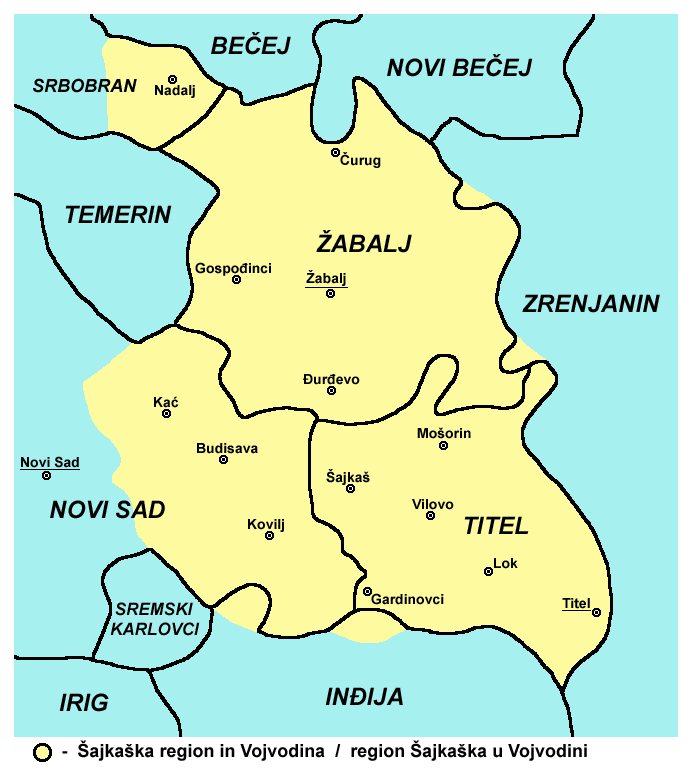
- Map of the Žabalj municipality and Šajkaška region (yellow), showing the location of Čurug

- Location within Vojvodina Location within Serbia Location within Europe
- Coordinates: 45°28′N 20°4′E
- Country: Serbia
- Province: Vojvodina
- District: South Bačka District
- Municipality: Žabalj

Area
  - Total: 136.90 km^{2} (52.86 sq mi)
- Elevation: 76 m (249 ft)

Population (2011)
  - Total: 8,166
  - Density: 59.65/km^{2} (154.5/sq mi)
- Time zone: UTC+1 (CET)
  - Summer (DST): UTC+2 (CEST)

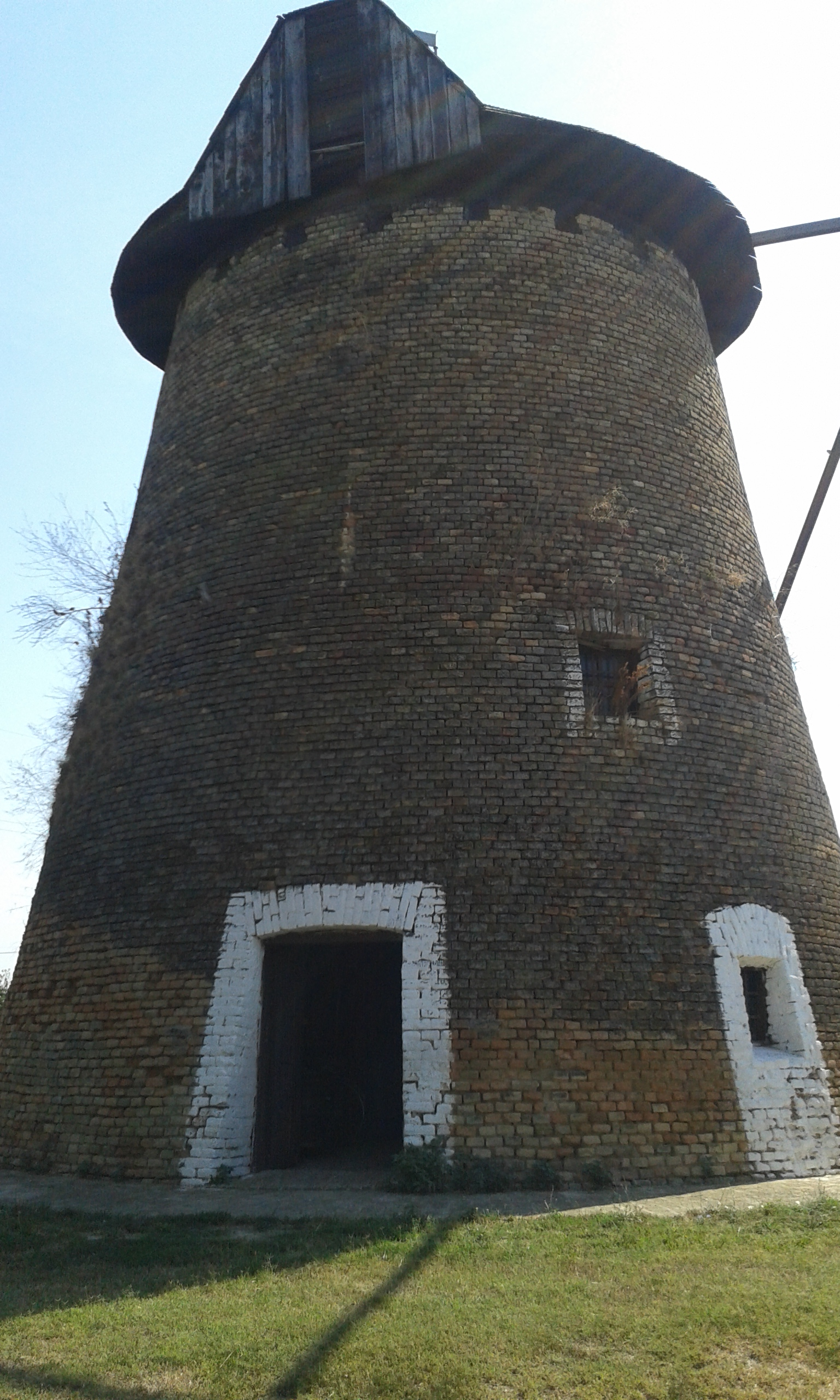
Windmill without blades

Čurug (Serbian Cyrillic: Чуруг; Hungarian: Csúrog) is a village located in the municipality of Žabalj, Serbia. It is situated in the Autonomous Province of Vojvodina. The village has a Serb ethnic majority and its population numbering 8,166 inhabitants (as of 2011 census).

== Name ==
In Serbian, the village is known as Чуруг or Čurug, in Hungarian as Csúrog, and in Pannonian Rusyn as Чуроґ or Чуруґ.

== Geography ==
The village of Čurug is situated in the wide lowlands of the south-eastern part of the Bačka region, in the place where the river Tisa creates its greatest meander down its flow.

It is bordered by the settlements of Bačko Gradište (to the north), Kumane and Novi Bečej (northeast), Taraš (east), Gospođinci (south), Temerin (southwest), Nadalj (northwest), and Žabalj (south-southeast).

The fact of it being settled in one of the highest parts of planes (82 m sea-level) is one of the main reasons the village always managed to avoid floods, and for being constantly populated during its long history.

== History ==
Several archaeological sites are located around the village (Archeological Site of Stari Vinogradi), mainly from time of Roman Empire and early Middle Ages. Traces of ancient Indo-European peoples, notably of Iazyges and Celts, are also discovered at this location. The archaeologists have found traces of Slavic settlement from the 9th-10th century, as well as the more distinctive ethnic traces of Serb settlement from the 15th century.

It is one of the oldest Vojvodinian settlements, mentioned as far as in 1238 (during the administration of the Kingdom of Hungary) under name Churlack (Csúrlak, Čurlak). In 1325, it was mentioned as Chorug, in 1332/1337 as Churvuk, in 1338/1342 as Charug, in 1363 as Csurog, and in 1380 as Curgug. By 1440, it was part of the Serbian despot Đurađ Branković's feudal lands. During Ottoman administration, it was recorded as Csaragh (in 1551), Chyrogd (in 1553), and Czurok (in 1656).

During Ottoman administration (16th - 17th century), Čurug was part of the Sanjak of Segedin and nahija of Titel. There was also Ottoman fort near the village, whose commander was beg Melković, who was also commander of forts in Bečej and Bečkerek. During the war between Ottomans and Habsburgs, in 1687/88, village was burned and destroyed.

During Habsburg administration, the village was rebuilt (in 1699). From 1703 to 1751, Čurug was part of Habsburg Military Frontier and from 1751 to 1769, it was part of the District of Potisje. From 1769 to 1873, it was again part of the Military Frontier, and from 1873 to 1918, it was part of the Bačka-Bodrog county within the Kingdom of Hungary and Austria-Hungary. In 1720, village had about 600 inhabitants, most of whom were Serbs and there was also one Hungarian family in the village.

Čurug was the strongest settlement in Šajkaš lands, and it played a prominent role in the events of the revolution of 1848-1849 when the people of the town met and proclaimed their struggle for their rights and freedom.

In 1880, population of Čurug numbered 6,406 inhabitants, including 4,961 (77%) Serbs, 981 (15%) Hungarians, 181 (2.8%) Germans, 96 (1.5%) Jews, etc. In 1910, population numbered 10,377 inhabitants, including 7,211 (69.5%) Serbs, 2,730 (26.30%) Hungarians, 203 (1.96%) Jews, 171 (1.65%) Germans, etc.

After the World War I, Čurug became part of the Kingdom of Serbs, Croats and Slovenes and subsequent South Slavic states. From 1941 to 1944, the town was under Axis occupation within Horthy's Hungary. On 6 January 1942 Hungarian troops and police entered Čurug searching for suspected partisans. They rounded up civilians, including women and children, and removed them to barns, storage buildings, and municipal buildings. Although some were released, some 900 people were reportedly murdered. Their bodies were stripped of all valuables. During the Communist purges in Serbia in 1944–45, Tito's partisans deported and exterminated almost the entire Hungarian population on charges of collective guilt. Following that, settlers from Bosnia and Herzegovina arrived in the village.

== Historical population ==
- 1961: 9,469
- 1971: 9,336
- 1981: 9,231
- 1991: 8,987
- 2002: 8,882
- 2011: 8,166

== Cultural monuments ==
First church in Čurug was mentioned in 1739, while today's Serbian Orthodox Church was built between 1860-1862. The massive white marble iconostasis partition was designed by Mihailo Valtrović and painted by Đorđe Krstić in the last decade of the 19th century. It is the third largest Serbian church, after The Church of Saint Sava and St Mark's Church in Belgrade. Čurug's church is protected as a cultural monument of exceptional importance.

Čurug's historic windmill dates back from 1843. It is one of the few preserved windmills in the region, protected as a cultural monument of great importance.

== Famous residents ==
- Count Simeon Zorić (Semyon Zorich) (1743–1799), Russian officer and Catherine the Great's lover, born in Čurug.
- Teodor Ilić Češljar (1746–1793), a Serbian painter. He was born in Čurug.
- Petar Konjović (1883–1970), a Serbian composer. He was born in Čurug.
- Jovan Tucakov (1905–1978), a Serbian pharmacologist. He was born in Čurug.
- Lazar Paču (1865–1915)
- Zdravko Rajkov (1927–2006), football player
- Patrijarh Porfirije (1961-), Serbian patriarch
- Lazar Lečić (1956-2010), painter and iconographer

== Twin town ==
- Dunavarsány, Hungary, since 2021

== See also ==
- List of places in Serbia
- List of cities, towns and villages in Vojvodina

== Sources ==
- Čurug kroz istoriju, Prometej, Novi Sad, 2002.
- Zvonimir Golubović, Racija u južnoj Bačkoj 1942. godine, Novi Sad, 1991.
- Slobodan Ćurčić, Broj stanovnika Vojvodine, Novi Sad, 1996.
