= Kučine, Croatia =

Coordinates: 43°31′57″N 16°31′47″E

- Interactive map of Kučine, Croatia

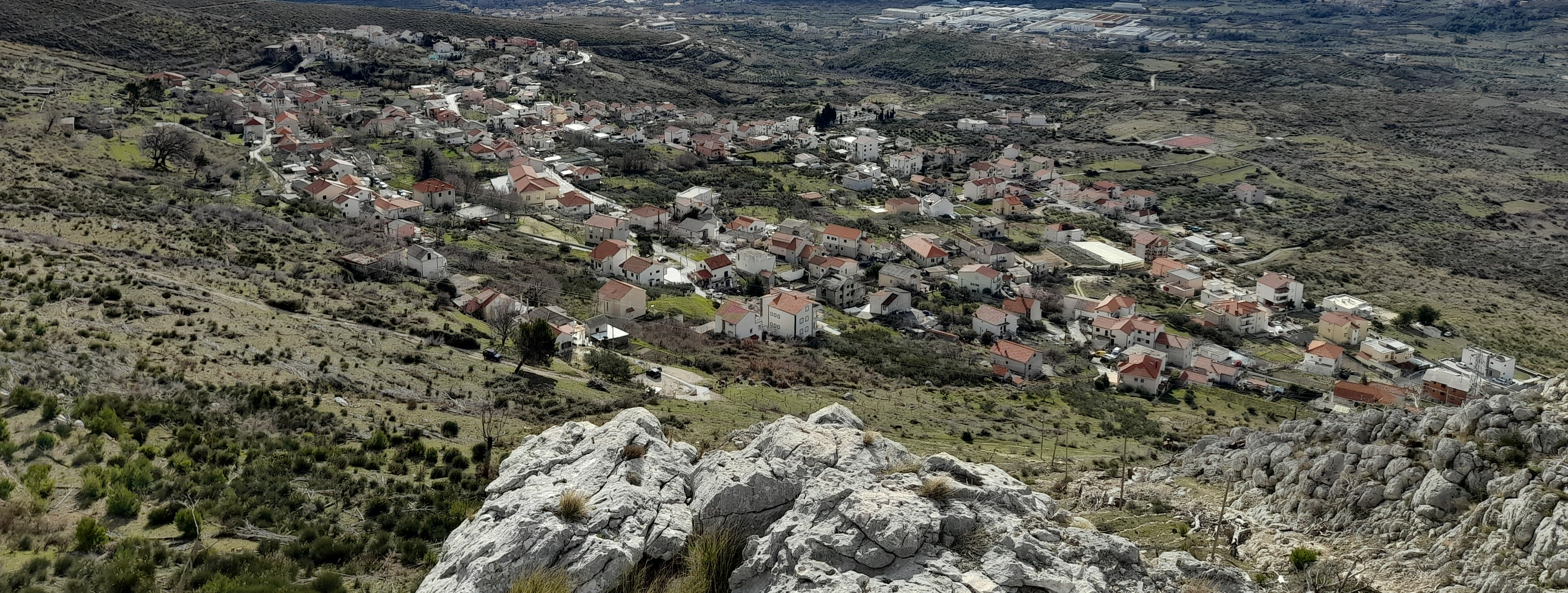

Kučine is a village near Solin, Croatia. In the 2011 census, it had 974 inhabitants.
