= Blaca, Serbia =

Blaca
- Village (Selo)
- Location within Serbia
- Coordinates: 43°03′43″N 20°22′20″E
- Country: Serbia
- District: Raška District
- Municipality: Tutin

Population (2002)
  - Total: 33
- Time zone: UTC+1 (CET)
  - Summer (DST): UTC+2 (CEST)

Blaca is a village in the municipality of Tutin, Serbia. The village had a population of 33 people at the time of the 2002 census.
