= Blaca, Croatia =

Settlement in Split-Dalmatia County, Croatia

Blaca
- Settlement
- Interactive map of Blaca
- Location of Blaca in Croatia
- Coordinates: 43°34′37″N 16°27′36″E
- Country: Croatia
- County: Split-Dalmatia
- City: Solin

Area
  - Total: 15.9 km^{2} (6.1 sq mi)

Population (2021)
  - Total: 3
  - Density: 0.19/km^{2} (0.49/sq mi)
- Time zone: UTC+1 (CET)
  - Summer (DST): UTC+2 (CEST)
- Postal code: 21210 Solin
- Area code: +385 (0)21

Blaca is a settlement in the City of Solin in Croatia. In 2021, its population was 3.

== Demographics ==
Blaca: Population trends 1857–2021
v

population	147		154	120	101	140			142	145	128	4				2	3
	1857	1869	1880	1890	1900	1910	1921	1931	1948	1953	1961	1971	1981	1991	2001	2011	2021

Sources: Croatian Bureau of Statistics publications
