= Anastasius the Fuller =

Italian Roman Catholic saint

Saint Anastasius the Fuller
- Died: 304
- Cause of death: Martyred by drowning
- Venerated in: Roman Catholic Church Eastern Orthodox Church

Saint Anastasius the Fuller (died 304) was a Christian saint and martyr of the pre-schism Christian Church. Anastasius was a fuller from Aquileia who later moved his business to Salona in Dalmatia.

He was arrested and brought to trial because of his missionary activity in Salona. He was subsequently sentenced to death and martyred by being drowned after proclaiming his Christian faith by painting a cross on his door.

Anastasius is the patron saint of fullers and weavers. His feast day is celebrated on September 7 in Roman Catholicism and on October 25 and December 5 in Eastern Orthodoxy.
