= Taraš =

Taraš Тараш
- Village (Selo)
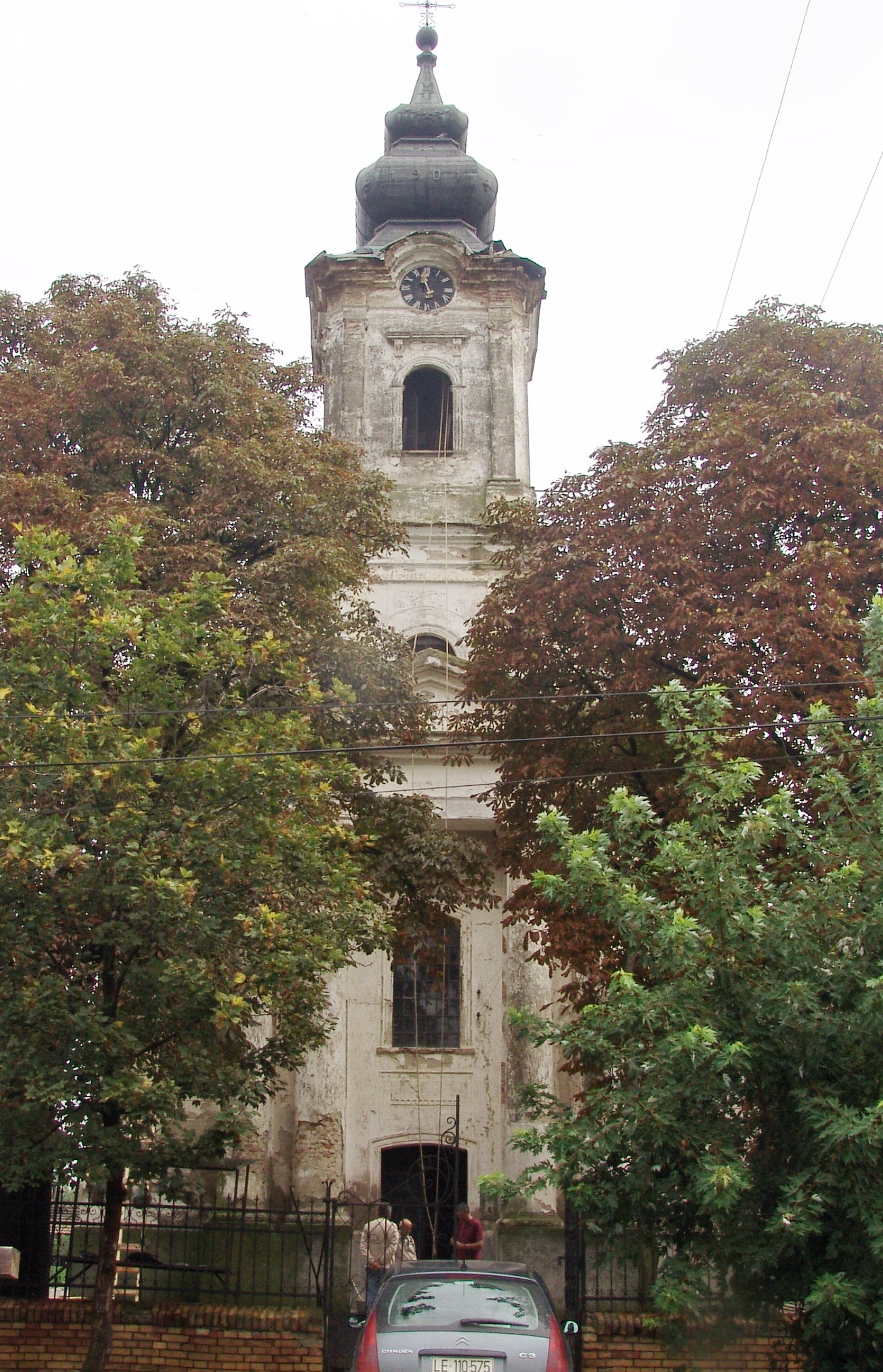
- The Orthodox Church

- Location within Serbia Taraš (Serbia) Taraš (Europe)
- Coordinates: 45°28′03″N 20°11′32″E
- Country: Serbia
- Province: Vojvodina
- District: Central Banat
- Municipalities: Zrenjanin
- Elevation: 72 m (236 ft)

Population (2002)
  - Taraš: 1,140
- Time zone: UTC+1 (CET)
  - Summer (DST): UTC+2 (CEST)
- Postal code: 23209
- Area code: +381(0)23
- Car plates: ZR

Taraš (Serbian Cyrillic: Тараш; Hungarian: Tiszatarrós) is a village located in the Zrenjanin municipality, in the Central Banat District of Serbia. It is situated in the Autonomous Province of Vojvodina. The village has a Serb ethnic majority (96.49%) and its population numbering 1,140 people (2002 census).

== Names ==
Names in other languages: German: Tarrasch, Hungarian: Tiszatarrós.

== Historical population ==
- 1821: 1,040
- 1825: 1,047
- 1863: 1,092
- 1868: 1,424
- 1880: 1,356
- 1910: 1,887
- 1921: 2,091
- 1931: 2,148
- 1939: 2,363
- 1948: 1,956
- 1953: 1,956
- 1961: 1,779
- 1971: 1,612
- 1981: 1,330
- 1991: 1,107
- 2002: 1,167

== See also ==
- List of places in Serbia
- List of cities, towns and villages in Vojvodina
