= Gospođinci =

Gospođinci: Госпођинци (Serbian); Boldogasszonyfalva (Hungarian)
- Village (Selo)
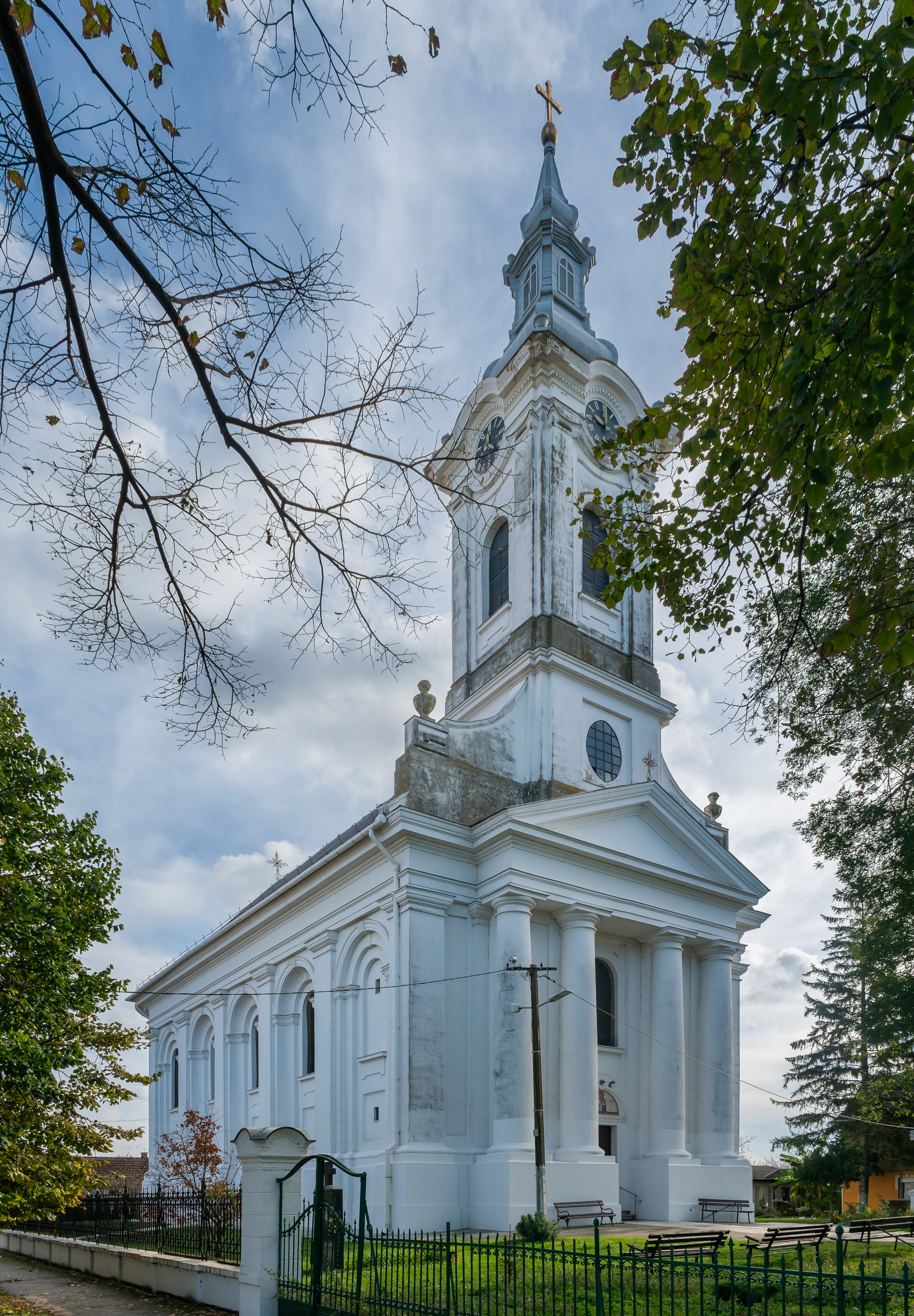
- The Orthodox Church

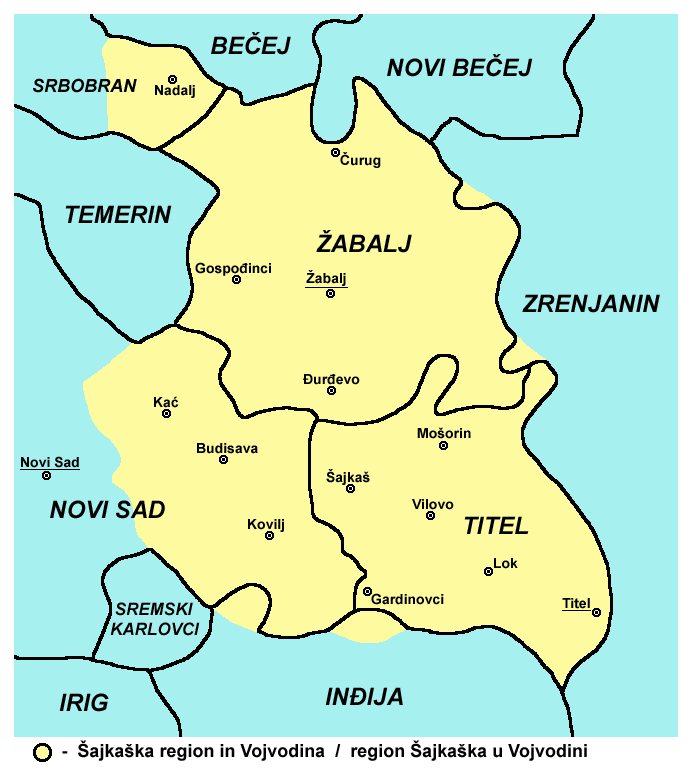
- Map of the Žabalj municipality and Šajkaška region, showing the location of Gospođinci

- Location within Vojvodina Location within Serbia Location within Europe
- Coordinates: 45°24′N 19°59′E
- Country: Serbia
- Province: Vojvodina
- Region: Bačka (Podunavlje)
- District: South Bačka
- Municipality: Žabalj
- Time zone: UTC+1 (CET)
  - Summer (DST): UTC+2 (CEST)

Gospođinci (Serbian Cyrillic: Госпођинци; Hungarian: Boldogasszonyfalva) is a village in the municipality of Žabalj, in the South Bačka District of Serbia. It is situated in the Autonomous Province of Vojvodina. The village has a Serb ethnic majority and its population is 3,896 (2002 census).

== Name ==
Its name derives from the Serbian word "gospođa" ("lady"). In Serbo-Croatian, the village is known as Госпођинци or Gospođinci, in Hungarian as Boldogasszonyfalva, in German as Frauendorf, and in Pannonian Rusyn as Ґосподїнци. The names of the settlement in Serbo-Croatian and Pannonian Rusyn are plural.

== Features ==
This is a typical Vojvodinian village, with its inhabitants mostly working in agriculture or in the capital of Vojvodina, Novi Sad. Most of the village streets are straight from one end to the other with houses built next to each other. As it is typical with most of the villages in Vojvodina, the houses, most of which were built before the 1980s, have only one floor and a big attic. The majority of properties are divided into "first" and "second" yards by small fences with gates, with gardens at the very back. First yards are, mostly, lawns, while second yards are used for barns, storage of agricultural machinery and equipment, and sometimes poultry farming. Gardens are used for growing potatoes, tomatoes and other vegetables. Apple and peach trees, among others, are very common.

== History ==
From the time of the Roman Empire just outside the village, in the west, lies a trench which the Romans had used for transport. During the Ottoman rule (16th–17th centuries), the village of Gospođinci was populated by ethnic Serbs. During the Habsburg rule in the 18th and 19th century, the village belonged to the Military Frontier province (the Šajkaš Battalion section).

Since 1918, the village was part of the Kingdom of Serbs, Croats and Slovenes and the subsequent South Slavic states. During the Hungarian Axis occupation, in a 1942 raid, 85 inhabitants of the village were murdered, of whom there were 47 men, 19 women, 15 children, and four elderly people. By nationality, the victims included 73 Serbs, 10 Jews, and two Rusyns.

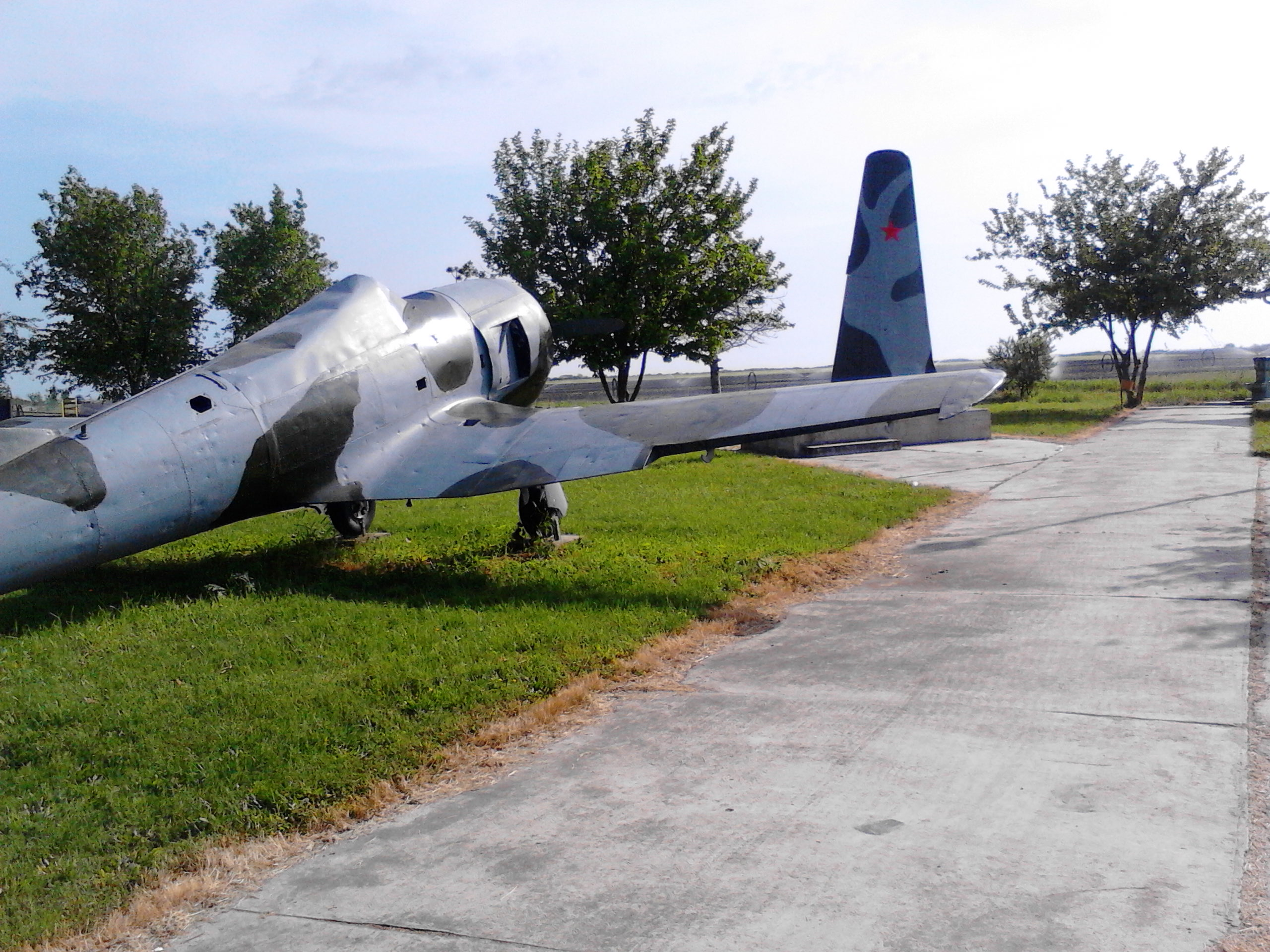
A Soko 522 converted into a monument to the 423rd Assault Aviation Regiment in Gospođinci.

== Historical population ==
- 1948: 3.239
- 1953: 3.305
- 1961: 3.705
- 1971: 3.654
- 1981: 3.817
- 1991: 3.553
- 2002: 3.896
- 2011: 3.688
- 2022: 3.545

As the data from 1981 to 1991 shows, the village had greater mortality rate then natality, which was, and still is, the main problem in the whole of Vojvodina, due to the decline in the quality of life caused by the death of Josip Broz Tito, and the communist ideals, which led to an escalating crisis in the former SFR of Yugoslavia. However, the data from 1991 to 2002 shows a population increase caused by Serb refugees from Bosnia and Herzegovina and Croatia who settled in the village during the Yugoslav Wars.

== See also ==
- List of places in Serbia
- List of cities, towns and villages in Vojvodina
