= Žabalj =

Žabalj Жабаљ (Serbian) Жабель (Pannonian Rusyn)
- Town and municipality
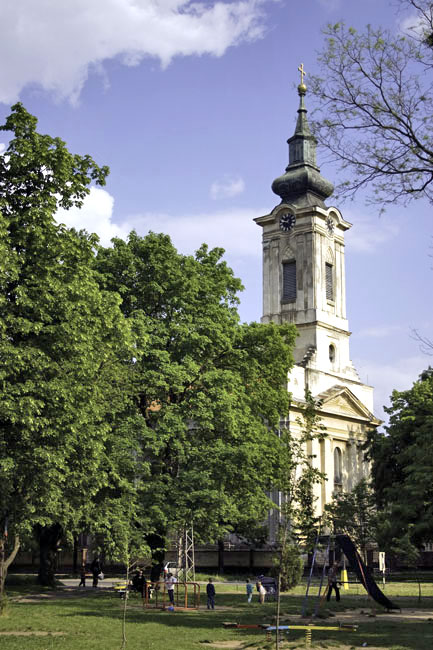
- Orthodox church in Žabalj

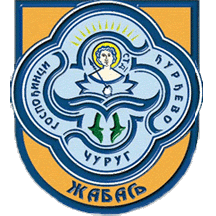
- Coat of arms

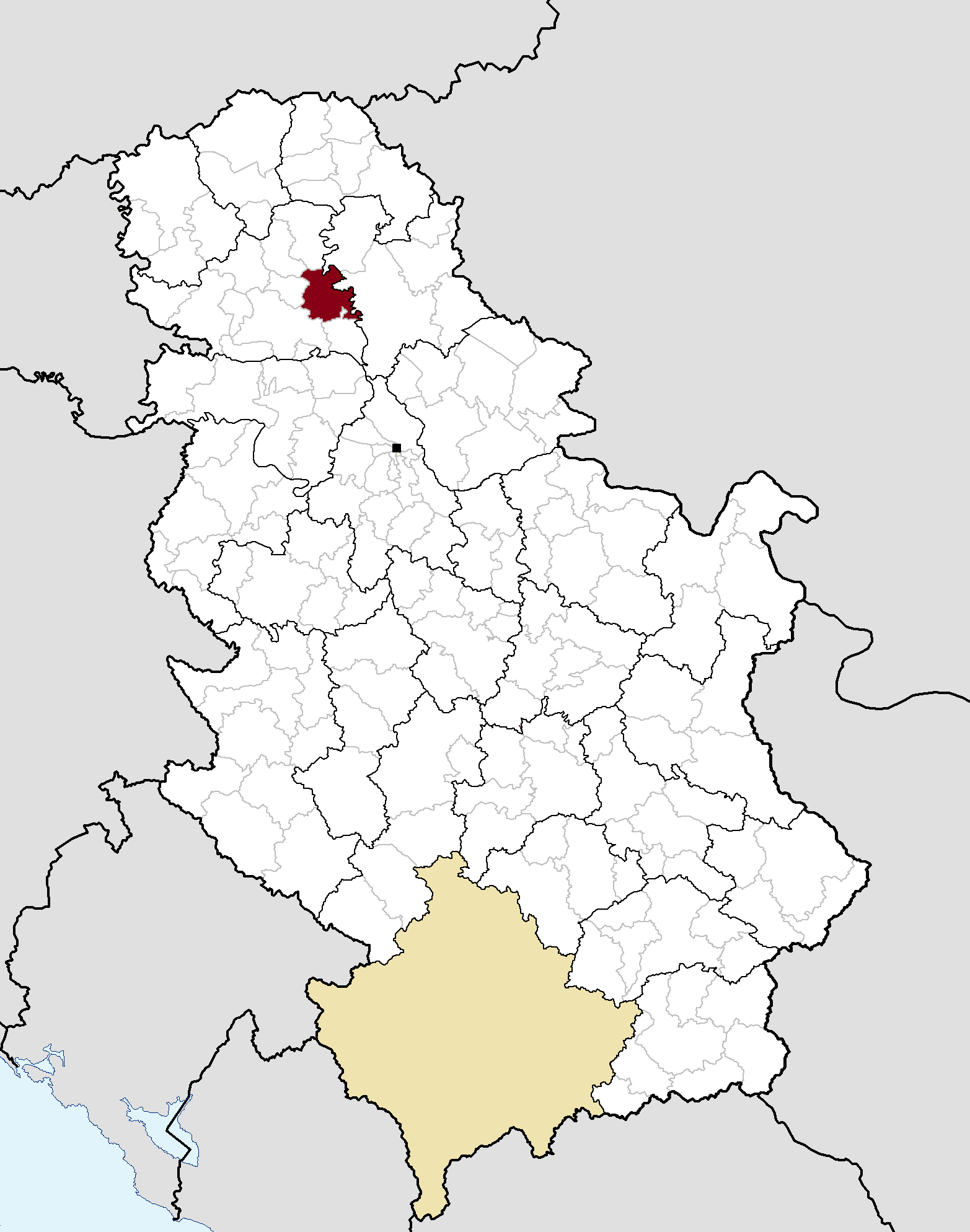
- Location of the municipality of Žabalj within Serbia
- Coordinates: 45°22′N 20°04′E
- Country: Serbia
- Province: Vojvodina
- District: South Bačka
- Settlements: 4

Government
  - Mayor: Uroš Radanović (SNS)

Area
  - Municipality: 400 km^{2} (150 sq mi)
- Elevation: 72 m (236 ft)

Population (2022 census)
  - Town: 8,449
  - Municipality: 23,853
- Time zone: UTC+1 (CET)
  - Summer (DST): UTC+2 (CEST)
- Postal code: 21230
- Area code: +381 21
- Car plates: NS
- Official languages: Serbian together with Pannonian Rusyn
- Website: www.zabalj.rs

Žabalj (Serbian Cyrillic: Жабаљ, pronounced [ʒǎːbaʎ]; Hungarian: Zsablya) is a town and municipality located in the South Bačka District of the autonomous province of Vojvodina, Serbia. According to 2022 census, the town Žabalj has a population of 8,449 and the municipality Žabalj has a population of 23,853. It is located in southeastern part of Bačka, known as Šajkaška. All settlements in the municipality have an ethnic Serb majority.

== Name ==
Its name came from the Serbian word "žaba"/жаба ("frog" in English). In Serbian, the town is known as Žabalj (Жабаљ), in Hungarian as Zsablya or Józseffalva (between 1886 and 1919), in Pannonian Rusyn as Жабель, in German as Josefdorf, and in Croatian as Žabalj.

== History ==
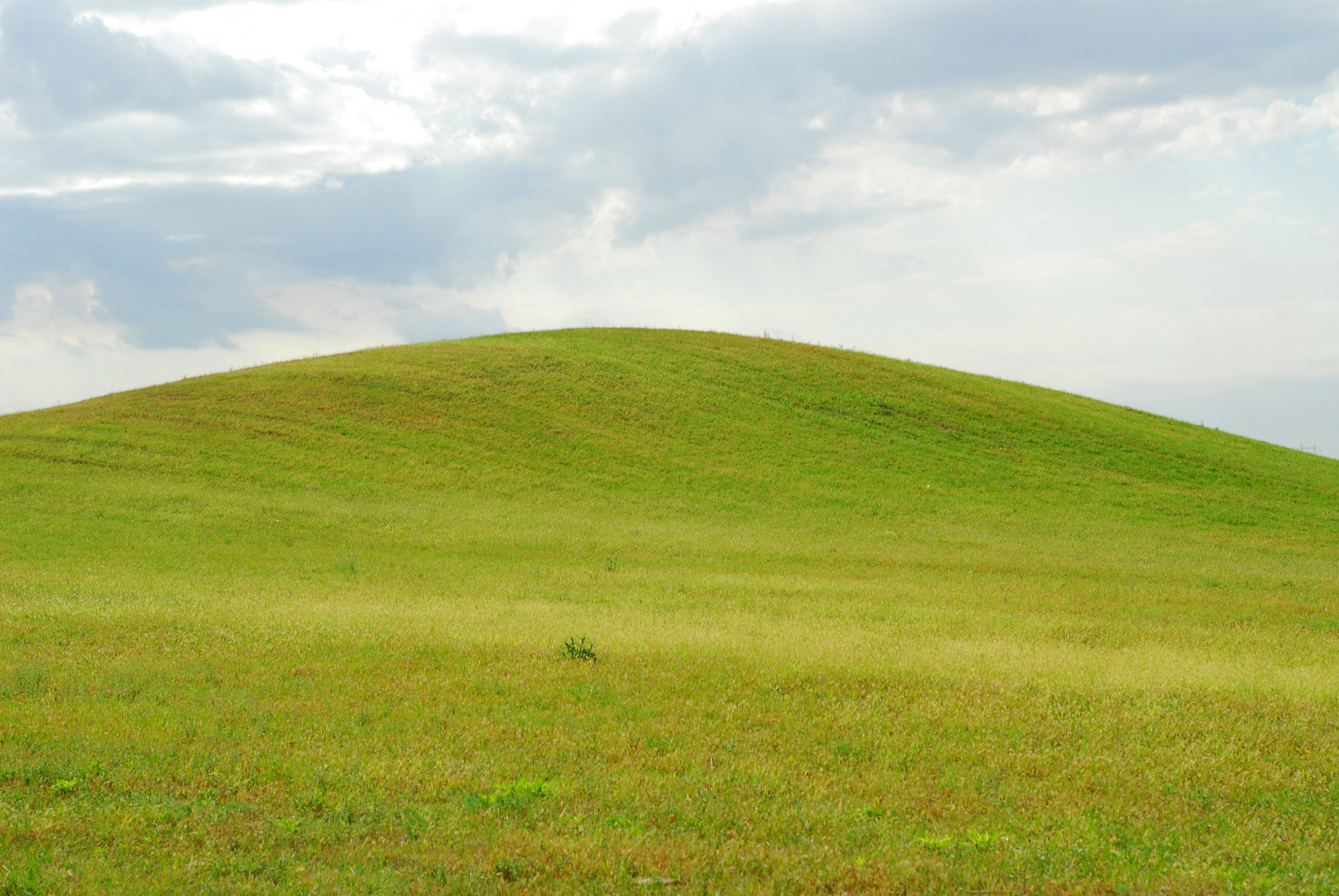
Neolithic kurgan in Žabalj

Žabalj was first mentioned in 1514 as Zeble, a fortress captured by György Dózsa. During the Ottoman rule (16th-17th century), it was populated by ethnic Serbs.

In the 18th and 19th centuries, Žabalj was part of the Habsburg Military Frontier (Šajkaš Battalion). The first church in Žabalj was mentioned in 1720, but it was later razed. After 1763, the village was part of Šajkaš Battalion until the military administration was abolished in 1783. Present-day Orthodox churches dedicated to Saint Nicholas were built in 1835. In 1901, a Catholic church was built as well.

It belonged to Hungary 1920, when by the Treaty of Trianon it became part of the Kingdom of Serbs, Croats and Slovenes and subsequent South Slavic states.

After the 1941 annexation of the town by Hungary, in a 1942 raid, 666 inhabitants of the town were murdered: 355 men, 141 women, 101 children, and 69 elderly people. Those who were liable, were convicted by Hungary in 1943.

== Inhabited places ==
Žabalj municipality encompasses the town of Žabalj, and the following villages:

- Gospođinci
- Đurđevo
- Čurug

== Demographics ==
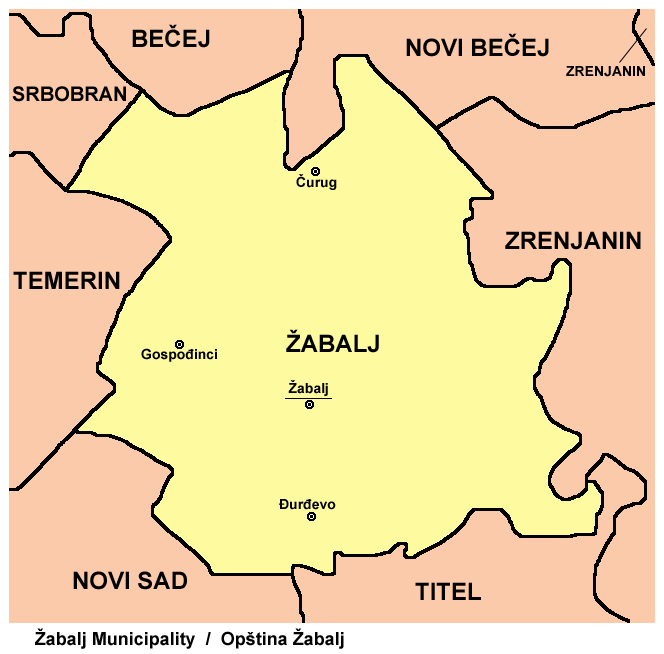
Map of Žabalj municipality

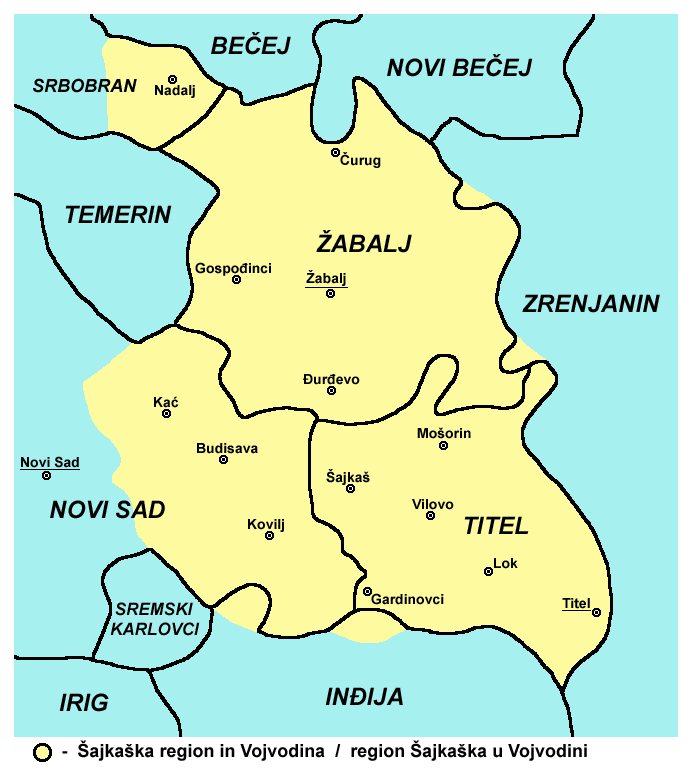
Map of the Žabalj municipality and Šajkaška region

=== Historical population of the town ===
- 1961: 7,457
- 1971: 7,851
- 1981: 8,503
- 1991: 8,766

=== Ethnic groups ===
The population of the Žabalj municipality:

- Serbs (86.25%)
- Rusins (5.11%)
- Romani (2.79%)
- Hungarians (1.1%)

== Economy ==
The following table gives a preview of total number of employed people per their core activity (as of 2017):

Activity	Total
Agriculture, forestry and fishing	253
Mining	21
Processing industry	664
Distribution of power, gas and water	32
Distribution of water and water waste management	84
Construction	138
Wholesale and retail, repair	937
Traffic, storage and communication	216
Hotels and restaurants	98
Media and telecommunications	17
Finance and insurance	30
Property stock and charter	3
Professional, scientific, innovative and technical activities	112
Administrative and other services	59
Administration and social assurance	217
Education	406
Healthcare and social work	284
Art, leisure and recreation	47
Other services	91
Total	3,708

== Gallery ==
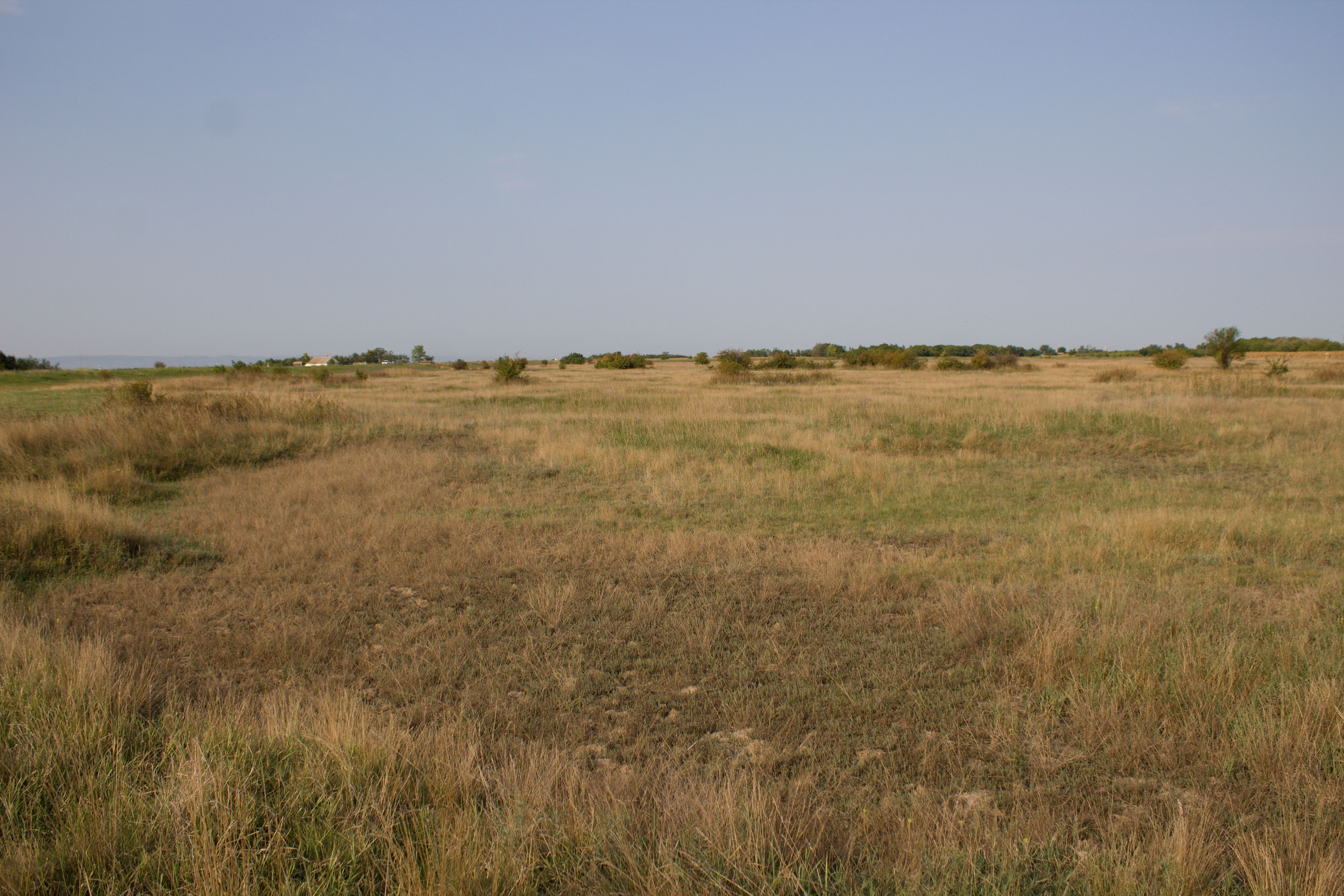
Saline steppe in Žabalj

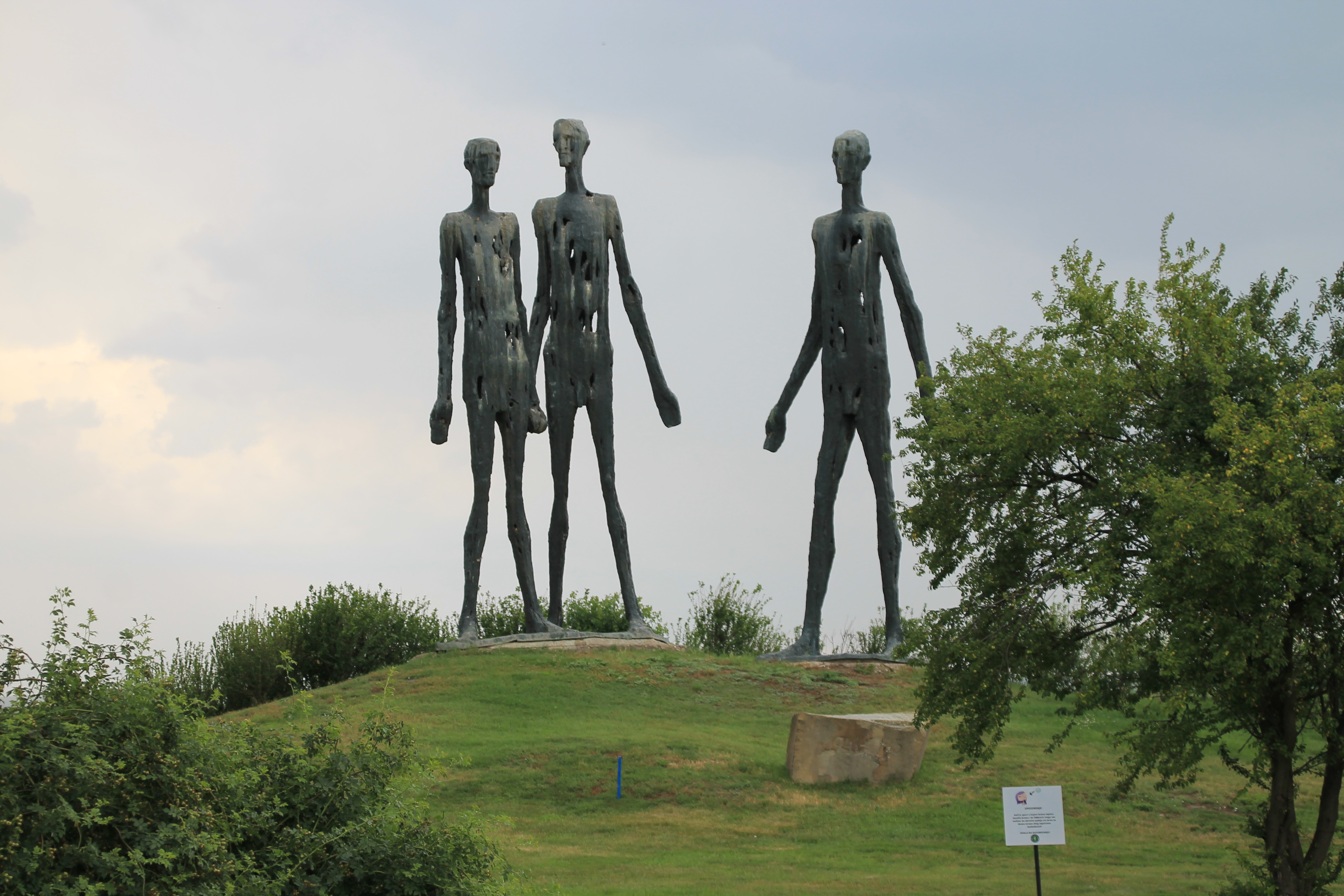
Monument of the 1942 raid victims near Žabalj

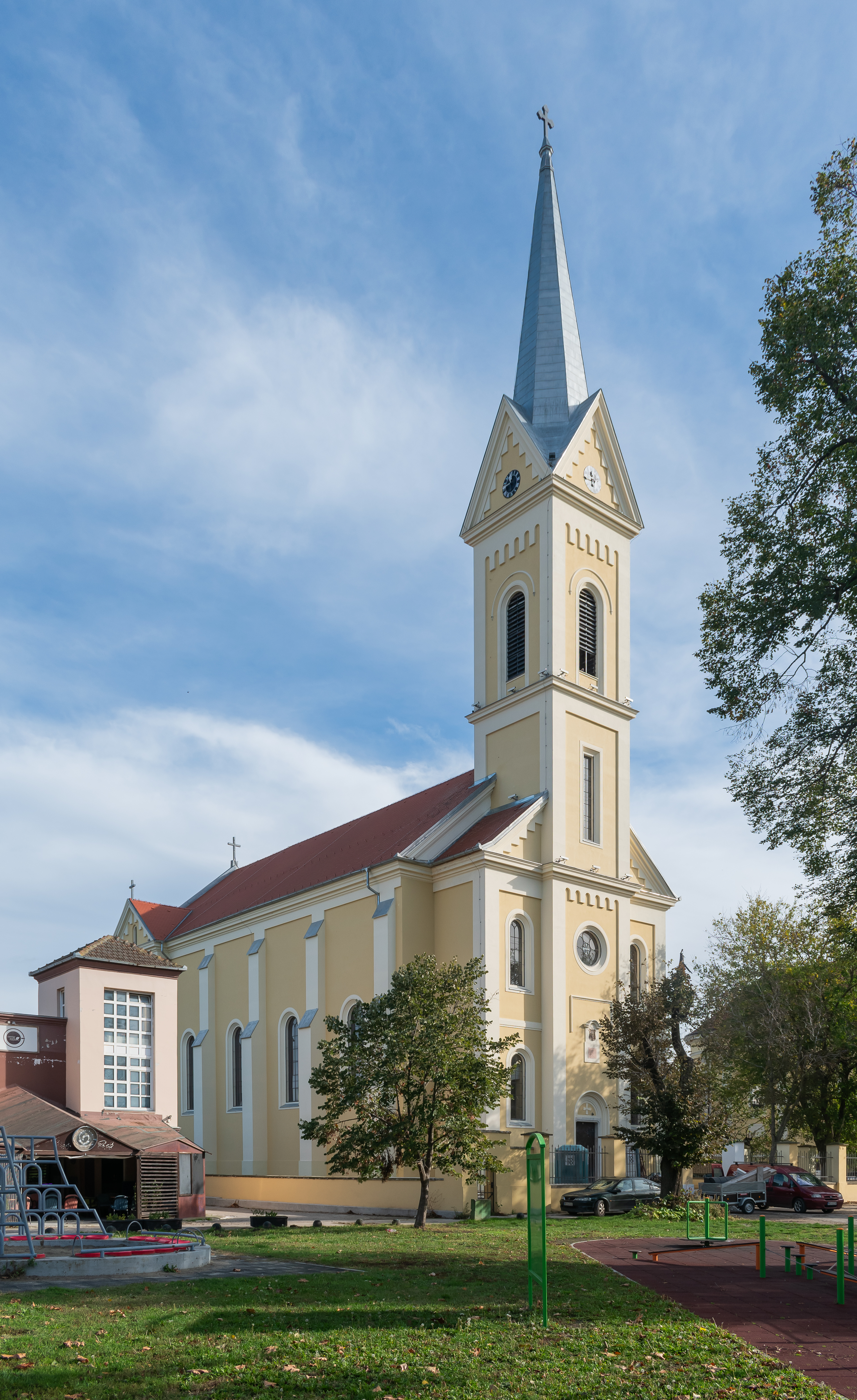
Our Lady of the Snow Catholic Church

== See also ==
- Šajkaška
- South Bačka District
- List of places in Serbia
- List of cities, towns and villages in Vojvodina
