= JGSP Novi Sad =

Serbian public transport company

- Official logo
- Native name: ЈГСП Нови Сад
- Company type: State-owned enterprise
- Industry: Transportation
- Founded: 3 August 1946; 79 years ago
- Headquarters: Novi Sad, Serbia
- Area served: Novi Sad
- Key people: Milan Balać (Director)
- Services: Coach service, Local and city transit
- Revenue: ▲€37.03 million (2024)
- Net income: ▲ (€6.95 million) (2024)
- Total assets: ▼€53.30 million (2024)
- Total equity: ▼€0 (2024)
- Owner: City of Novi Sad (100%)
- Number of employees: 1,292 (2024)
- Website: www.gspns.co.rs
- Footnotes / references Business ID: 08041822; Tax ID: 100277615

JGSP Novi Sad (Serbian Cyrillic: ЈГСП Нови Сад; full legal name in Serbian: Јавно Градско Саобраћајно Предузеће Нови Сад, Javno Gradsko Saobraćajno Preduzeće Novi Sad) is a public transit company for the city of Novi Sad and is under the city's jurisdiction. The company conducts intercity lines for areas in Temerin, Žabalj, Sremski Karlovci and Irig.

== History ==
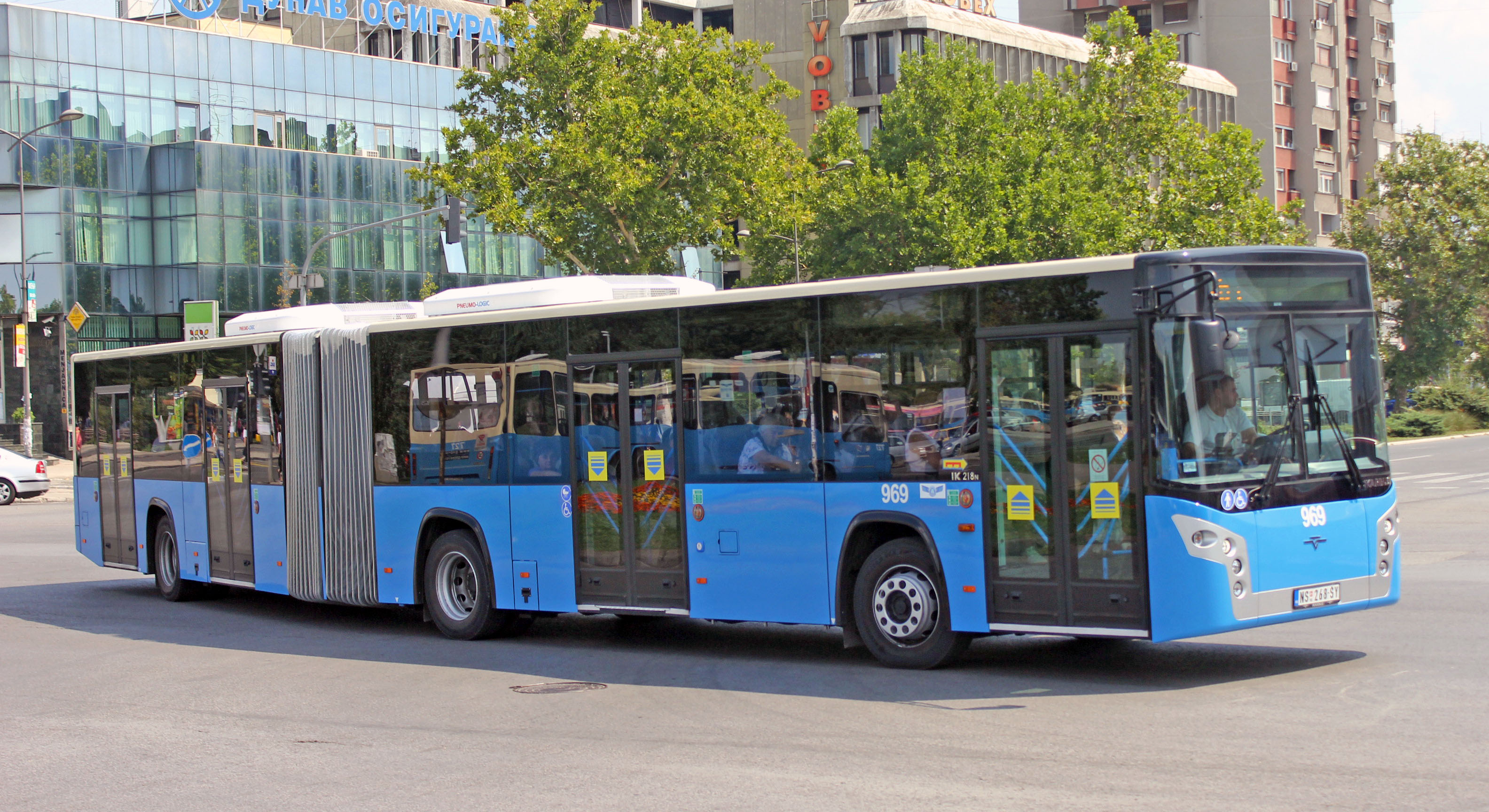
Ikarbus IK 218N JGSP bus in Novi Sad

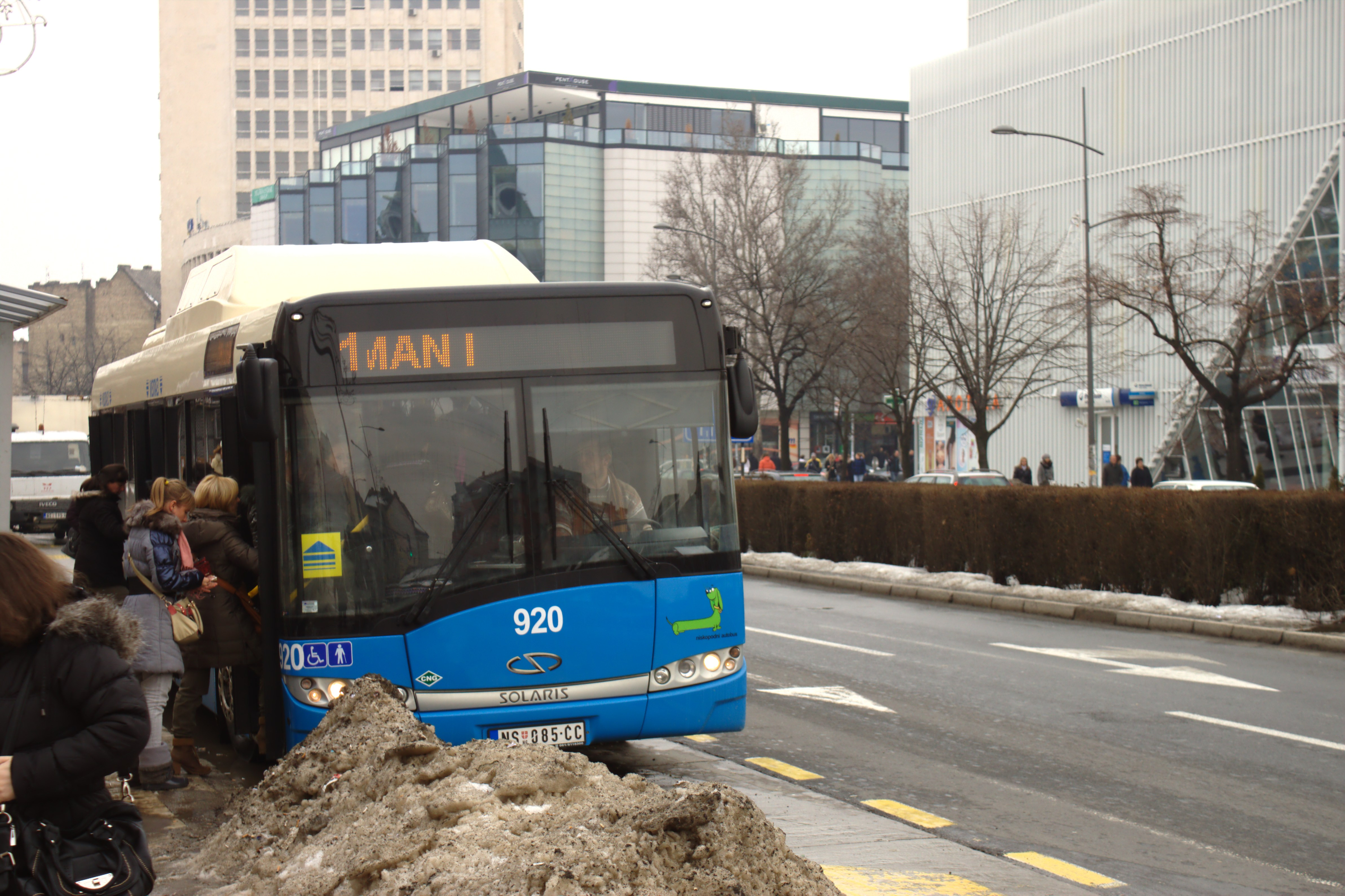
Solaris Urbino JGSP bus in Novi Sad

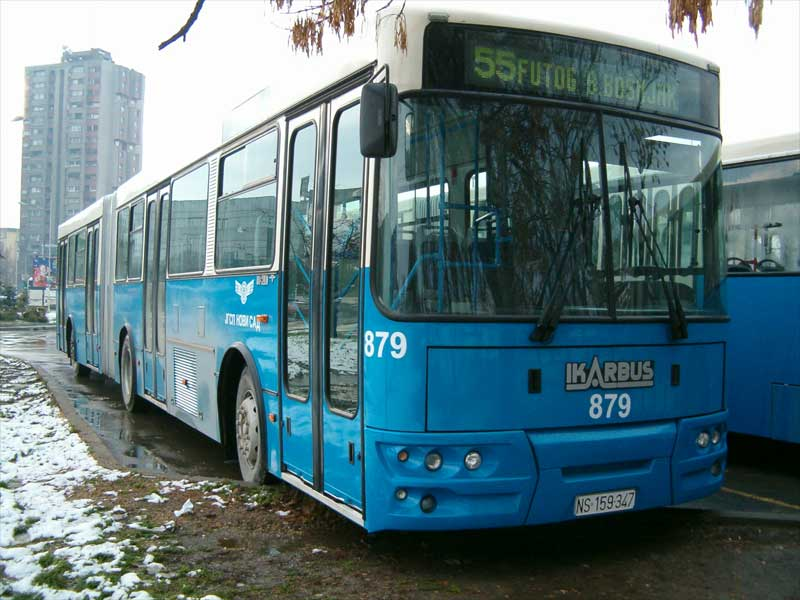
Ikarbus Ik-201 JGSP bus in Novi Sad

The beginnings of public transportation in Novi Sad date back to 1868, when the city authorities at the time were asked to grant permission for public passenger coaches to be used around the city. The number of public horse drawn coaches kept growing that by 1884 their activity was regulated by a statute.

With the development of the City of Novi Sad came the idea of introducing electric trams. The first tram in Novi Sad started working and servicing passengers on 30 September 1911. When Novi Sad became the center of the newly formed Danube Banovina in 1929, the population size of the city increased exponentially. In 1930, the city authorities decided to buy three buses for public transportation. Public transportation was on the rise, but with the outbreak of World War II, and the occupation, bus traffic was reduced. The interruption of tram traffic came in 1944 as a result of the Allied bombing where a power station was badly damaged. The tram service restarted on 25 May 1945.

The decision of the National Committee established the City transport company (Serbian: Градско саобраћајно предузеће, Gradsko saobraćajno preduzeće) on 3 August 1946. With the growing use of buses for public transportation, tram services were completely cancelled and demolished by 1958.

In order to ensure better conditions for the reception and dispatch of suburban and intercity passengers, the Novi Sad bus station was built and opened in December 1967, next to the Novi Sad railway station. Seventy new Volvo buses were launched in 1969 out of 110 in GSP bus lot that year.

By the decision of the City Council of Novi Sad in 1991, GSP was declared a public enterprise under the jurisdiction of the City. The workers council was abolished and a management board was formed, consisting of representatives of the city and the enterprise.

In November 2024, the company's director Mladen Papović was arrested in an international police action as being part of the group which was involved in smuggling narcotics from abroad; as a result, Milan Balać was appointed as new company's director.

== Buses ==
As of January 2016, JGSP Novi Sad has 290 buses (89 articulated and 201 solo) in its fleet operating in urban and suburban lines, with the average bus age of 13.5 years.

According to the list of registered buses for the calendar year of 2015, JGSP Novi Sad has the following bus brands in its fleet: Volvo, Ikarbus, Solaris, Irisbus and Neobus.

== Lines ==
=== Urban Lines ===
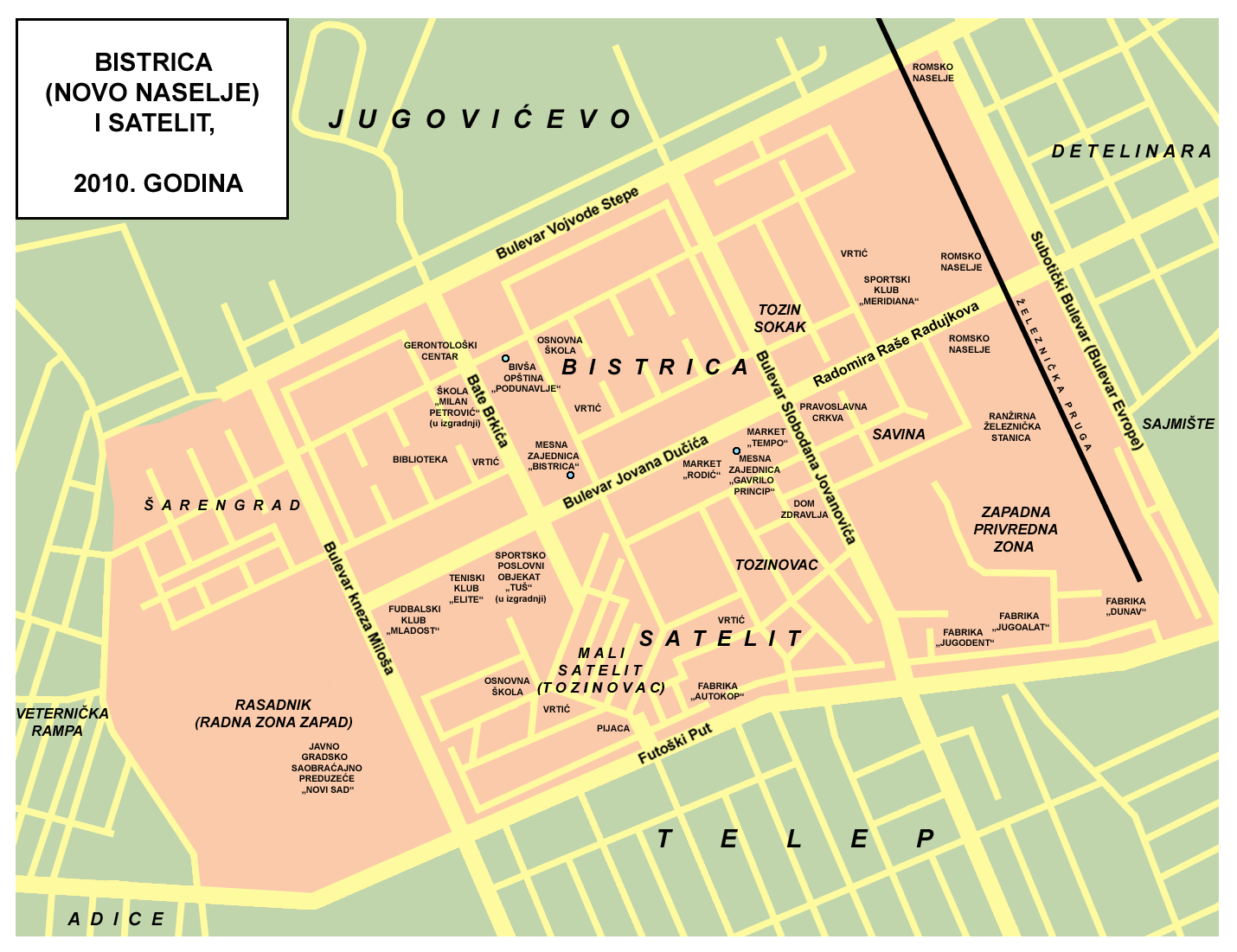
Detailed map of Novo Naselje neighborhood with marked location of JGSP Novi Sad

All urban lines are classified under I zone of public transportation.

As of June 2026, these are the following urban bus lines:

Urban Lines

- 1: Klisa — Centar — Liman 1
- 2: Centar — Novo Naselje
- 3: Detelinara — Centar — Petrovaradin
- 3A: Railway Station -- Pobeda
- 3B Petrovaradin (OŠ "Jovan Dučić) -- Puckaroš
- 4: Railway station — Centar— Liman 4
- 5: Temerinski put — Centar — Avijatičarsko Naselje
- 6: Podbara — Centar — Adice
- 7:
  - 7A Novo Naselje — Railway Station — Liman 4 — Novo Naselje
  - 7B Novo Naselje — Liman 4 — Railway station — Novo Naselje
- 8: Novo Naselje — Centar — Liman 1
- 9: Novo naselje -- Liman — Petrovaradin
- 10: Centar — Industrijska zona Jug
- 11:
  - 11A Railway station — Hospital — Liman — Railway station
  - 11B Railway station — Liman — Hospital — Railway station
- 12: Centar — Telep
- 13: Detelinara -- Liman -- Univerzitet
- 14: Centar — Sajlovo
- 15: Centar -- Industrijska Zona Sever
- 16: Railway station -- Pristanišna zona
- 17: Centar -- TC "BIG"
- 19:Railway station -- RTV -- Mišeluk (Bolnica)

Daily urban lines start from 04:30 till midnight, except lines 8, 11a and 11B (from 05:00 till midnight), and lines 10, 15, 16, 17, 19 which vary depending on the day . Lines 18A and 18B are overnight lines and they have four or five departure schedules from midnight till 04:00 in the morning.

Articulated buses run on working days and weekends on individual or majority of the departure lines for 4, 5, 7a, 7b and 8.

=== Suburban Lines ===
Suburban lines of Novi Sad have five zones (I, II, III, IV, V), and in the intercity traffic and neighboring districts exist four zones, with nine zones when including sub-zones (IIA, IIIA, IIIB, VA, VB).

All suburban lines depart from the bus terminals from the main Novi Sad bus station and the Novi Sad railway station, with few departures also conducted from the city center, as well as Industrial Zones North and South.

The suburban lines function according to the principle of tournaise, which means that there is no specific departure interval, but the buses run on different lines during the day (unlike the city lines which have a certain departure interval and the vehicle only runs on a specific line during the day).

As of June 2026, these are the following suburban bus lines:

Suburban Lines

- 21 Šangaj
- 22 Kać
- 23 Budisava
- 24 Kovilj
- 30 Pejićevi Salaši
- 35 Čenej
- 41 Rumenka
- 42 Kisač
- 43 Stepanovićevo
- 52 Veternik
- 53 Old Futog
- 54 Futog (Grmečka street)
- 55 Futog (Braće Bošnjak street)
- 56 Begeč
- 64 Bukovac
- 68 Sremska Kamenica (Vojinovo)
- 69 Sremska Kamenica (Čardak)
- 71 Sremska Kamenica (Bocke)
- 72 Sremska Kamenica (Paragovo)
- 73 Sremska Kamenica (Mošina Vila)
- 74 Popovica
- 76 Ledinci

Articulated buses run on working days on individual or majority of the departure lines for 22, 23, 24, 32, 33, 41, 42, 43, 52, 53, 54, 55, 56, 61, 62 and 64. On other lines regular or mini-buses are used. On Saturdays and Sundays, these lines exclusively use regular or mini-buses, except on Saturdays during certain departure dates for lines 24, 32, 52, 53, 54, 55, and 56.

=== Intercity Lines ===
As of June 2026, these are the following intercity bus lines:

Intercity Lines

- 31 Bački Jarak
- 32 Temerin
- 33 Gospođinci
- 60 Sremski Karlovci (Belilo 2)
- 61 Sremski Karlovci (Vinogradarska street)
- 62 Sremski Karlovci (Dudara)
- 63 Čortanovci
- 77 Stari Rakovac
- 78 Beočin Selo
- 79 Čerević
- 80 B. A. S.
- 81 Banoštor
- 84 Lug
- 86 Vrdnik

=== Overnight Lines ===
Overnight urban lines are carried hourly exclusively on the following lines:

- 18A Novo Naselje — Detelinara — Center — Liman — Novo Naselje (from 00:30 till 03:30)
- 18B Novo Naselje — Liman — Center — Detelinara — Novo Naselje (from 00:00 till 04:00)

Overnight services are subject to the same tariff system as daily services.
