= Nemanovci =

Nemanovci Немановци
- Suburban settlement
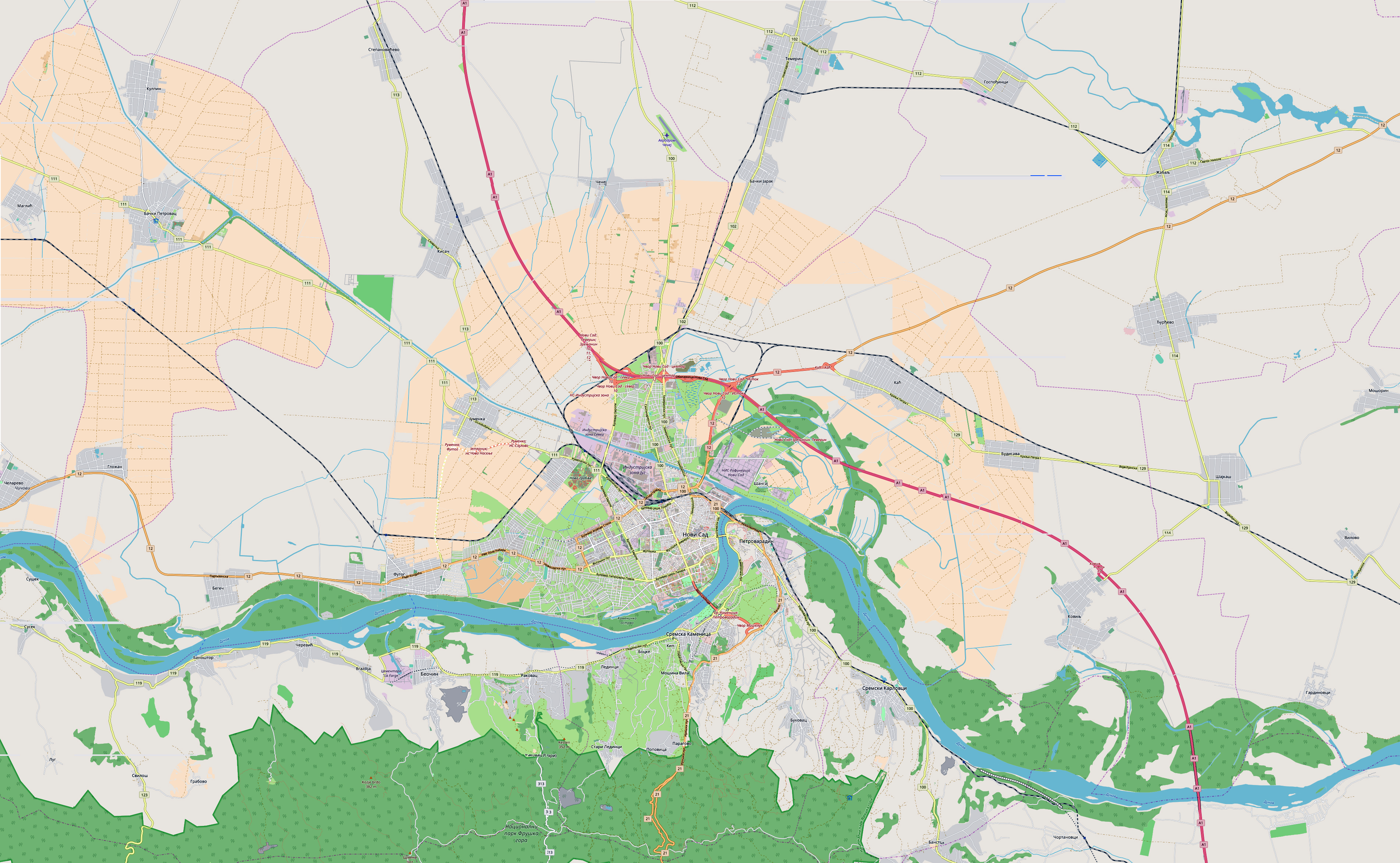
- Location within Novi Sad
- Coordinates: 45.3176°N 19.8584°E
- Country: Serbia
- Province: Vojvodina
- District: South Bačka
- Municipality: Novi Sad
- Time zone: UTC+1 (CET)
  - Summer (DST): UTC+2 (CEST)
- Area code: +381(0)21
- Car plates: NS

Nemanovci (Serbian Cyrillic: Немановци) is a small suburban settlement (hamlet) near Novi Sad, Serbia. It is located on the outskirts of Novi Sad proper, close to Čenej and Kać.

Nemanovci is not regarded as a separate populated place for the census, but as part of the village of Čenej, some 10 km away. However, Nemanovci, together with neighbouring Pejićevi Salaši, have their own local community named Pejićevi Salaši–Nemanovci.

In January 2014 the local community was estimated to number 311 inhabitants in 64 dwellings.
