= Lasta Beograd =

Serbian transportation company

Lasta
- Official logo
- Native name: Ласта
- Company type: Joint-stock company
- Industry: Transportation
- Founded: 18 February 1947; 79 years ago
- Headquarters: Autoput Beograd-Niš 4, Belgrade, Serbia
- Area served: Serbia, countries of former Yugoslavia, Europe
- Key people: Vladan Sekulić (General director); Stefan Mijajlović (Executive director); Branislav Stanković (Executive director)
- Services: Bus, coach services
- Revenue: ▲€68.39 million (2022)
- Net income: ▲ (€7.98 million) (2022)
- Total assets: ▼€92.62 million (2022)
- Total equity: ▼€23.61 million (2022)
- Owner: Akcionarski Fond a.d. (29.70%); Erste Bank - Joint Account (16.70%); Government of Serbia (13.78%); PIO Fond (7.88%); Others (As of 12 May 2024)
- Number of employees: 2,332 (2022)
- Subsidiaries: SP Lastra d.o.o. Otisak Putovanja d.o.o. Lasta Montenegro d.o.o. SP Lasta Banja Luka d.o.o.
- Website: lasta.rs

- Service type: Intercity and international coach service
- Alliance: Eurolines
- Hubs: Belgrade
- Fleet: 850

Lasta (Serbian: Ласта, full legal name: Saobraćajno preduzeće Lasta a.d. Beograd) is a Serbian bus company headquartered in Belgrade, Serbia. It is part of the pan-European Eurolines network and operates bus coaches on a comprehensive network of routes throughout Serbia and Europe.

== History ==
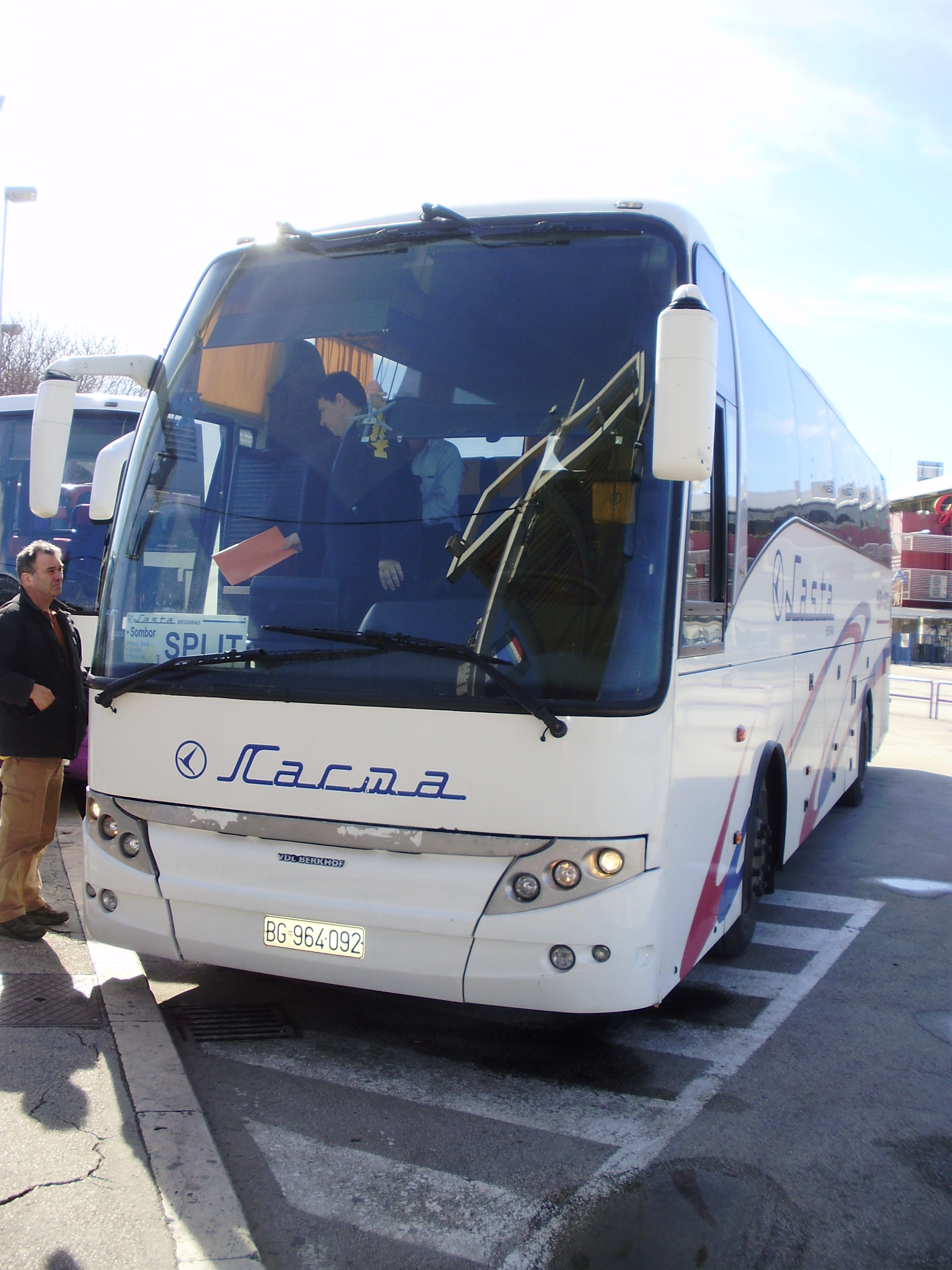
Lasta bus in Split, Croatia

Lasta was established on 18 February 1947. In the first two decades of existence, it operated mainly as cargo transporter and partially as passenger carrier. Since the late 1960s, it operated only as passenger transporter.

Today, Lasta provides public transport within the city of Belgrade, intercity routes to all parts of Serbia, as well as international routes to destinations in Europe. Its bus line from Belgrade (Serbia) to Paris (France) is in function over 40 years. With about 1,000 buses and coaches, "Lasta" is the carrier of the suburban transport in Belgrade, Kragujevac, Aranđelovac and other municipalities in Central Serbia. In suburban transport of Belgrade, Lasta takes a part with about 300 buses. Domestically, Lasta owns Lastra Lazarevac, another bus transport company which has around 100 buses. In its ownership, Lasta has 35% of shares of Panonijabus.

In August 2019, Lasta introduced 30 new buses in its fleet, manufactured by Turkish TEMSA. In November 2020, the Government of Serbia announced that it will be seeking new owners of several large companies owned by the Government through the privatization process, among them being Lasta Beograd as well.

== Market and financial data ==
As of 10 May 2024, Lasta Beograd has a market capitalization of 11.13 million euros.

== Vehicle fleet ==
=== Tourist buses ===
- Otokar Navigo F 185S
- SOR LH 12
- TEMSA Opalin
- TEMSA Tourmalin
- VDL Berkhof Axial 50
- VDL Berkhof Excellence 3000 HD
- Mercedes-Benz O560 Intouro RH

=== Intercity buses ===
- VDL Berkhof Bova Lexio 130-310
- Ikarbus IK-312

=== Suburban buses ===
- SOR C-12
- FAP A-537
- Karsan J10
- Mercedes-Benz UO345 Conecto

=== City buses ===
- Ikarbus IK-103
- Ikarbus IK-206
- Ikarbus IK-218N (Lastra)
- Ikarbus IK-112LE (Lastra)
- Neobus Citta SLF
- Neobus Citta LEA
