= Pejićevi Salaši =

Pejićevi Salaši Пејићеви Салаши
- Suburban settlement
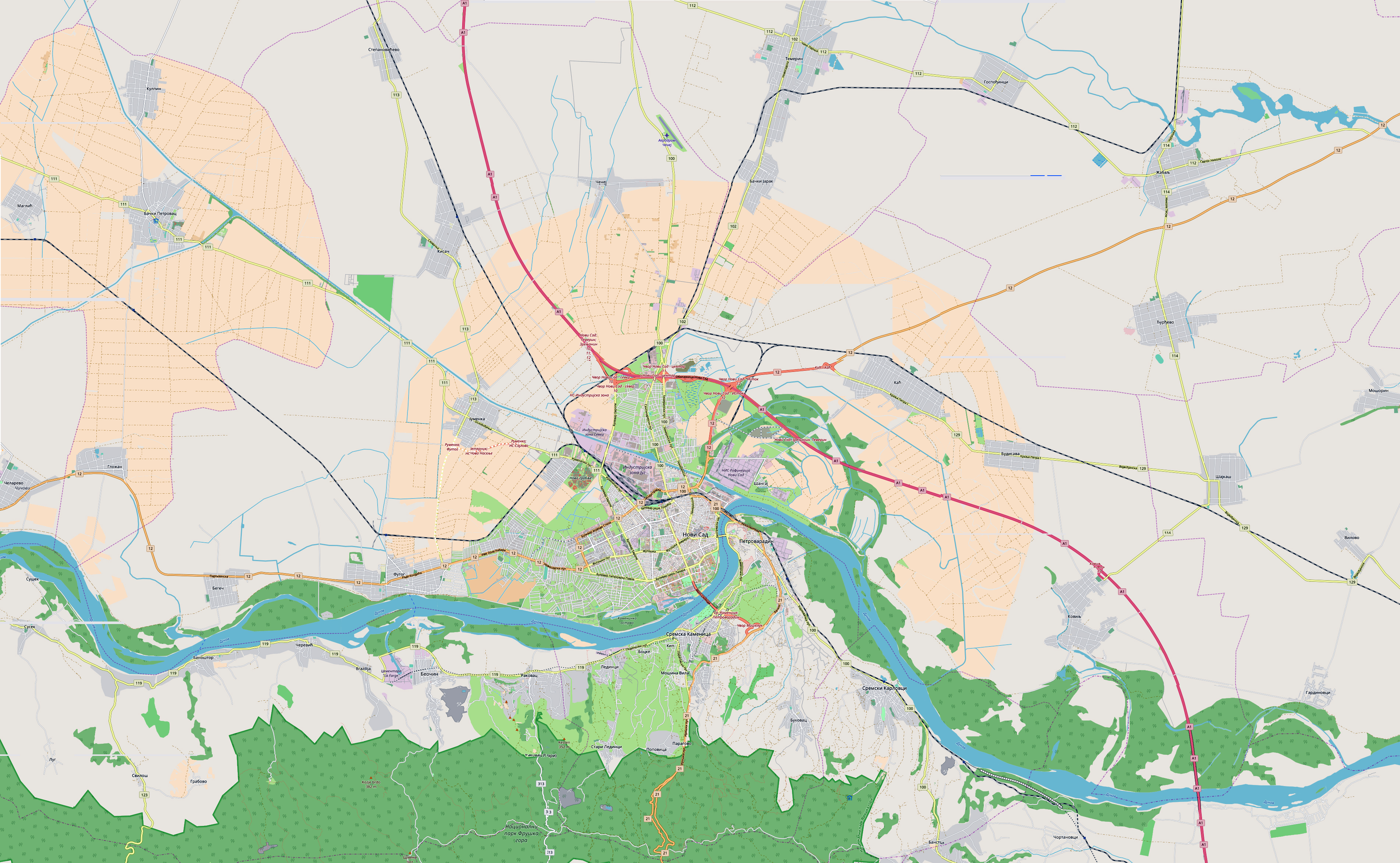
- Location within Novi Sad
- Coordinates: 45.32741°N 19.871517°E
- Country: Serbia
- Province: Vojvodina
- District: South Bačka
- Municipality: Novi Sad

Area
  - Total: 3.77 km^{2} (1.46 sq mi)
- Time zone: UTC+1 (CET)
  - Summer (DST): UTC+2 (CEST)
- Area code: +381(0)21
- Car plates: NS

Pejićevi Salaši (Serbian Cyrillic: Пејићеви Салаши) is a suburban settlement of the city of Novi Sad, Serbia. It is located on the outskirts of Novi Sad proper area, close to Čenej and Kać.

It is not regarded as a separate populated place in census, but as part of village of Čenej, some 10 km away. However, Pejićevi Salaši, together with neighbouring Nemanovci, have their own local community named Pejićevi Salaši–Nemanovci.

By a January 2014 estimation, the local community numbered 311 inhabitants in 64 homes. Pejićevi Salaši is connected to Novi Sad by bus line number 30.

== Notable residents ==
- Radule, punk rock musician.
- Đorđe Čvarkov, fictional character from the Serbian comedy show Državni posao
