= Stepanovićevo =

Stepanovićevo Степановићево (Serbian)
- Suburban settlement
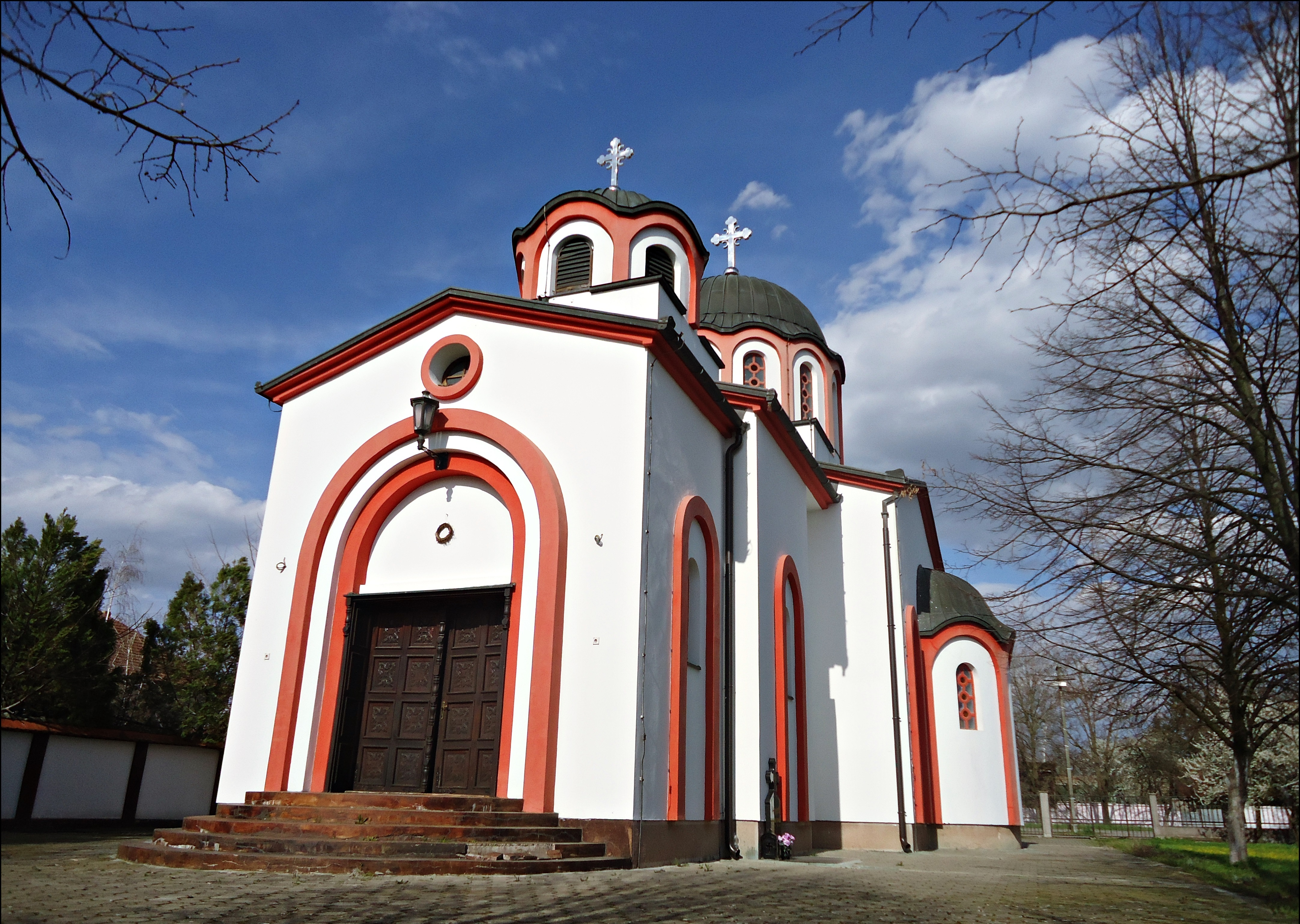
- Church of Saint Lazar of Kosovo in Stepanovićevo

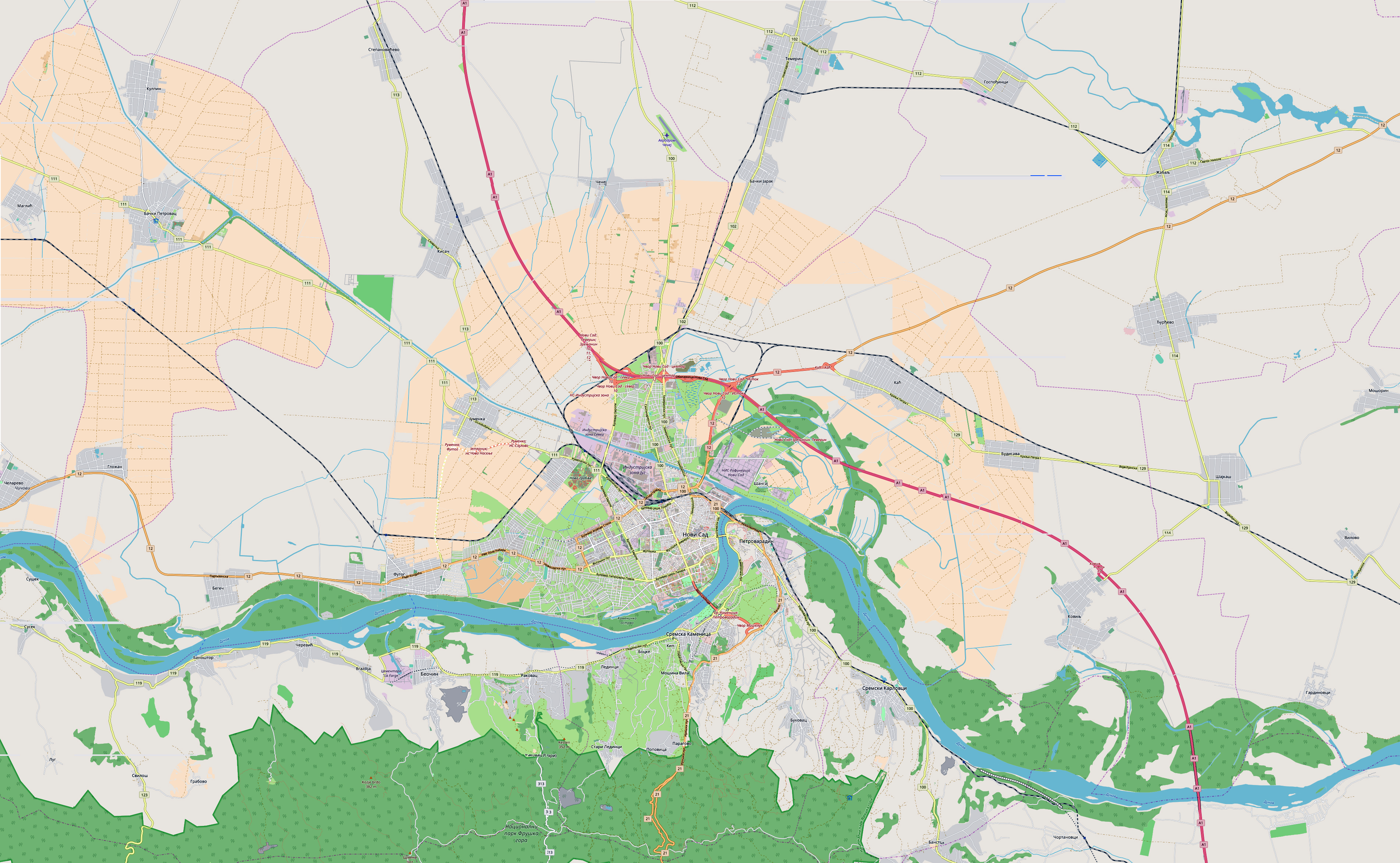
- Location within Novi Sad Location within Vojvodina Location within Serbia
- Coordinates: 45°24′50″N 19°41′54″E
- Country: Serbia
- Province: Vojvodina
- District: South Bačka
- Municipality: Novi Sad

Area
  - Total: 47.11 km^{2} (18.19 sq mi)

Population (2011)
  - Total: 2,021
  - Density: 42.90/km^{2} (111.1/sq mi)
- Time zone: UTC+1 (CET)
  - Summer (DST): UTC+2 (CEST)

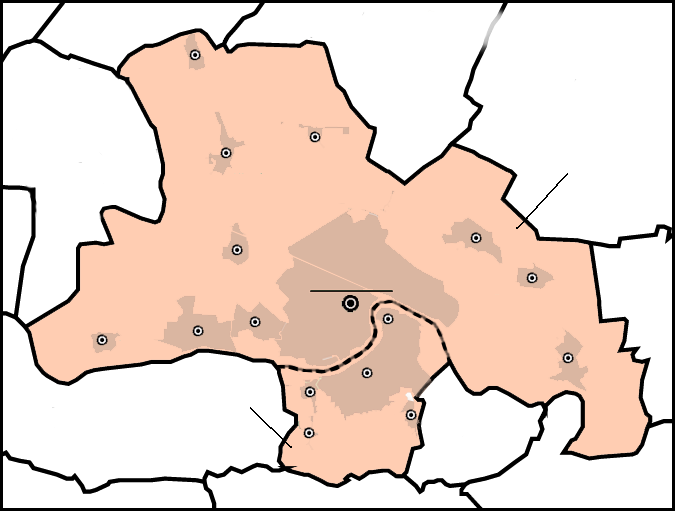

Stepanovićevo (Serbian Cyrillic: Степановићево) is a suburban settlement of the city of Novi Sad, Serbia. It has a Serb ethnic majority and a population of 2,021 people (2011 census). Stepanovićevo is situated about 20 km north-west from Novi Sad, between the settlements of Kisač and Zmajevo.

== Name ==
The town was named after Serbian Voivode Stepa Stepanović who distinguished himself in Serbia's wars from 1876 to 1918. In Serbian Cyrillic, the village is known as Степановићево, in Serbian Latin and Croatian as Stepanovićevo.

== History ==
The town was founded after World War I (between 1920 and 1924).

== Demographics ==
Historical population
Year	Pop.	±%
1948	1,965	—
1953	1,916	−2.5%
1961	2,169	+13.2%
1971	2,188	+0.9%
1981	2,096	−4.2%
1991	2,020	−3.6%
2002	2,214	+9.6%
2011	2,021	−8.7%
Source: Census

== Transport ==
The town is located on the main rail tracks in Serbia, which connect Subotica, Novi Sad, and Belgrade. Stepanovićevo, like most settlements close to Novi Sad, is connected to Novi Sad by the city's bus service JGSP Novi Sad - bus line 43 (the line passes Rumenka and Kisač as well). Many buses on the route Vrbas–Novi Sad also pass through the village.

== See also ==
- List of places in Serbia
- List of cities, towns and villages in Vojvodina
