= Stevan Ćurčić =

Serbian politician, journalist, head of the Ministry of Finance

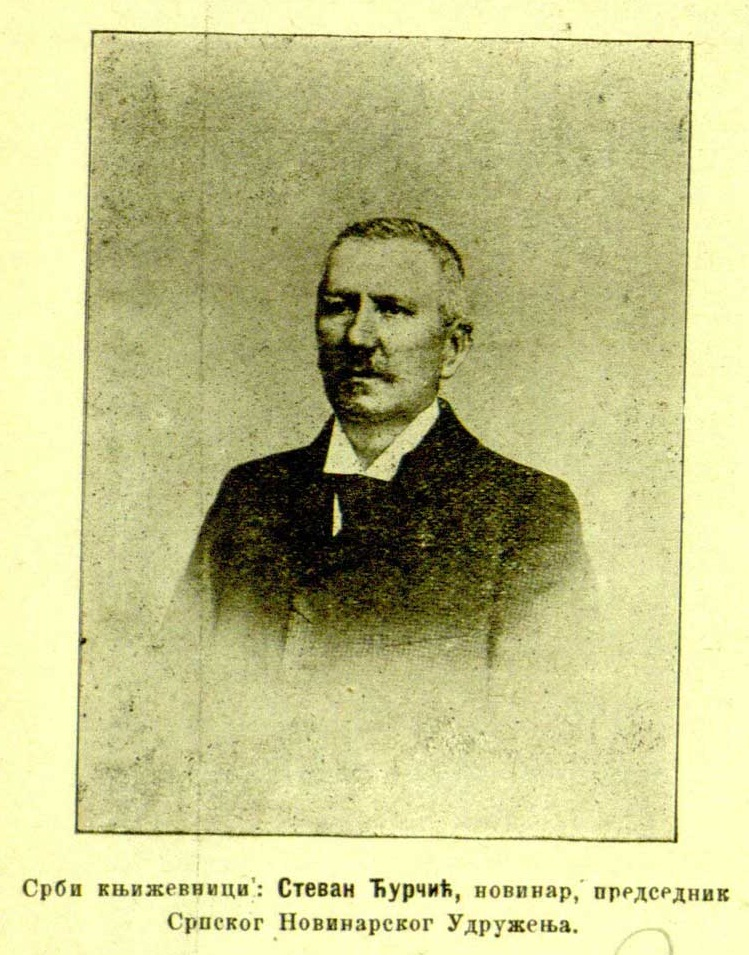
Portrait of Stevan Ćurčić, Serbian journalist

Stevan Ćurčić (26 November 1850 – 1932) was a Serbian politician, journalist, head of the Ministry of Finance.

== Biography ==
He was born on 26 November 1850 in Kać. He completed his education in jurisprudence in Vienna.

For 33 years, he was secretary and vice president of the Serbian Red Cross. He published a literary magazine Srbadija. An illustrated entertainment and literary magazine Srbadiju printed in Vienna from 1874 to 1877 which he continued to publish in Belgrade in 1881 and political papers such as Beogradski Dnevnik, Narodni Dnevnik and Beogradske Novine. This last publication was issued from 1895 until 1913. From 1877 to 1889, he was the editor of the business daily newspaper Novine srpske.

In the early 1880s, he founded Serbian Journalists' Association, and was the first secretary and then president for several years. He was both a People's Deputy and the King's Member of the National Assembly. In the civil service, he held the following positions: Head of the Ministry of Finance and manager of state debts. He was dismissed from the service because he spoke as a Member of Parliament against the Carlsbad government debt arrangement (1895). At the invitation of the prince Nikola I Petrović he drafted laws for Montenegro, and his most important work is the Constitution of Montenegro from 8 December | 1905. Ćurčić in the letter he submitted together with the draft Constitution emphasizes: " Your Royal Highness! A sudden leap from absolutism to the most advanced constitutionality - as it exists in England, Belgium, France, and to some extent in Serbia - would be harmful and dangerous in Montenegro. The bad consequences of such a step are incalculable. That is why I ... (damaged) tried to make the transition from an absolutist to a constitutional monarchy easy, gradual and natural, so that it would not be a source of political, state and social turmoil. Guided by these intentions, I drafted a constitution that I think will best suit the current circumstances and needs of Montenegro ".

He wrote a pamphlet: "Let's Raise Anthropology in Belgrade" (1884) and printed his speeches on the general debate on the conversion of state debts ([1895) in a separate booklet.

Stevan Ćurčić was married to Stanа, the eldest daughter of Jevrema and Jelena Grujić. They had two daughters, Milica and Jelena, and two sons, Jevrem and Milan. His collection of weapons from First and Second Serbian Uprising, with rifles haduk - Veljko Petrović and Tanaska Rajića, won a large gold medal and a charter at a major exhibition of Balkan countries in London in 1907. Today, this collection is located in Jevrem Grujić Museum in Belgrade.

He died in Belgrade on 4 February 1932.
