= Neobus (Serbia) =

Serbian bus manufacturer

- Native name: Необус
- Company type: Joint-stock company
- Industry: Automobile
- Founded: 1 June 1952
- Defunct: 2012; 14 years ago
- Fate: Closed
- Headquarters: Privrednikova Street 20, Novi Sad, Serbia
- Area served: Worldwide
- Key people: Ninoslav Šimić (Trustee)
- Products: Buses
- Subsidiaries: Neobus BiH
- Website: www.neobus.rs

Neobus a.d. (full legal name: Neobus, Novosadska fabrika autobusa a.d. Novi Sad) was a Serbian bus manufacturer which went bankrupt in 2012. The major shareholder from 2004 was a Saudi businessman Alaa Maghrabi Mohammedali A. Neobus produced buses on its original chassis and on the chassis of other manufacturers such as Volvo, DAF Bus, Mercedes-Benz, FAP.

== History ==
Neobus was established on 1 June 1952 in Novi Sad, second largest city in Serbia, as Autokaroserija. Neobus was built on the foundations of Stražilovo repair workshop, which was first founded in 1947 in Novi Sad. In the time of its foundation Neobus only had 15 workers. Today, there are 183 employees with this firm. During the first years of its existence Autokaroserija's key business activity was repairing and rebuilding car chassis. In 1956 Autokaroserija started producing new chassis.

From that time, Autokaroserija started closely cooperating with TAM (automobile and engine factory) Maribor, a Slovenian truck, bus and chassis manufacturer. The cooperation led to full integration of Autokaroserija with TAM in 1973.

The following year, 1974 is one of the most significant years in the history of Neobus. This was the period when Autokaroserija produced its very first urban bus on Volvo chassis for the needs of Novi Sad City Public Transport Company (JGSP). The business relations started between Autokaroserija and JGSP in 1974 made JGSP Autokaroserija's most important buyer.

In 1986 started the golden era for Neobus. The factory had moved to a new location in Novi Sad Industrial Zone South where a large facility was built measuring more than 20.000 square meters in surface placed on a plot of 110.000 square meters. 700 workers produced as many as 650 buses a year during this period.

With the dissolution of the Socialist Federal Republic of Yugoslavia there is an interruption of business relations between Autokaroserija and Slovenian TAM. Autokaroserija became an independent bus manufacturer but had many difficulties mostly due to the economic sanctions the United Nations imposed on the Federal Republic of Yugoslavia. There was a loss of market share and business connections which put Autokaroserija in a very hard situation.

In 1992 the name Autokaroserija was changed to Neobus. The company was limited to Serbian market which was insufficient concerning the installed capacities and the nature of the branch. Business activity started to slow down until it finally collapsed, Neobus entered bankruptcy in 1999, during severe economic problems in Serbia. By 2001, the firm managed to get out of the bankruptcy and started producing buses again. In 2004 The Serbian Privatization Agency held an auction in which Neobus was sold to Alaa Maghrabi Mohammedali A, from Saudi Arabia. The new owner has his own transport enterprise in Saudi Arabia called Maghrabi Hajj Transport Company. The company purchased hundreds of buses from former SFRY manufacturers in 1980s which led to the acquisition of Neobus.

In 2006 Neobus signed a Strategic Cooperation Agreement with Volvo, making Neobus Volvo's official bodybuilder for South Eastern Europe. VDL Bus & Coach signed an agreement with Neobus for the production of intercity buses.

On 22 November 2012, Neobus was declared bankrupt again. In 2013, China's Yutong Bus was in talks to purchase Neobus, but the deal never materialized.

== Products ==
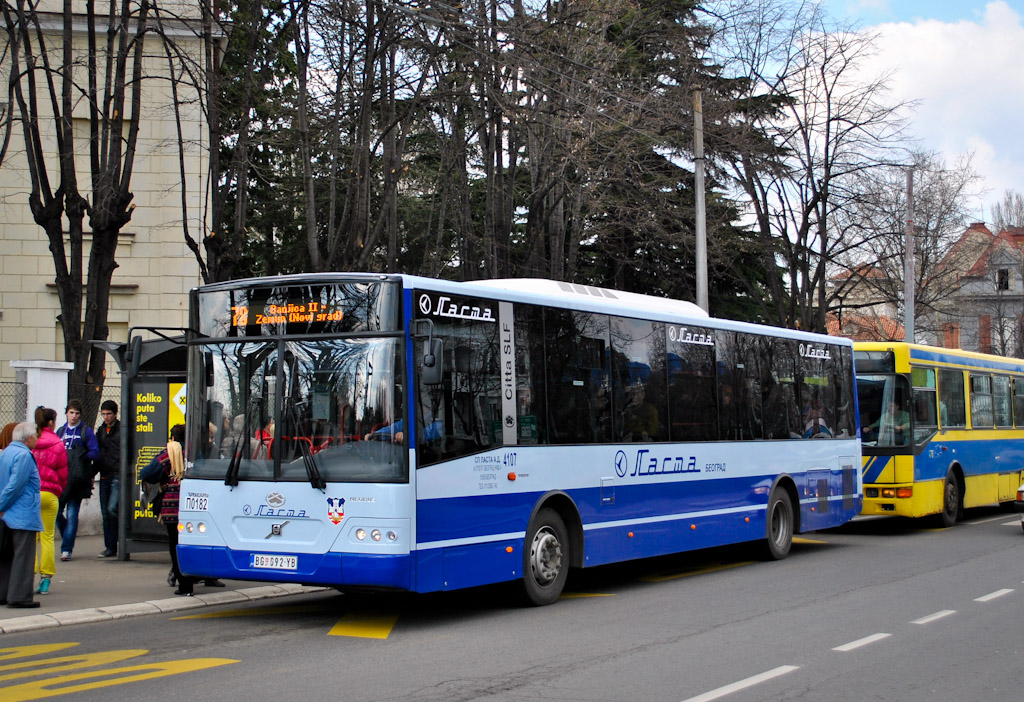
Neobus Citta SLF owned by transport company Lasta Beograd.

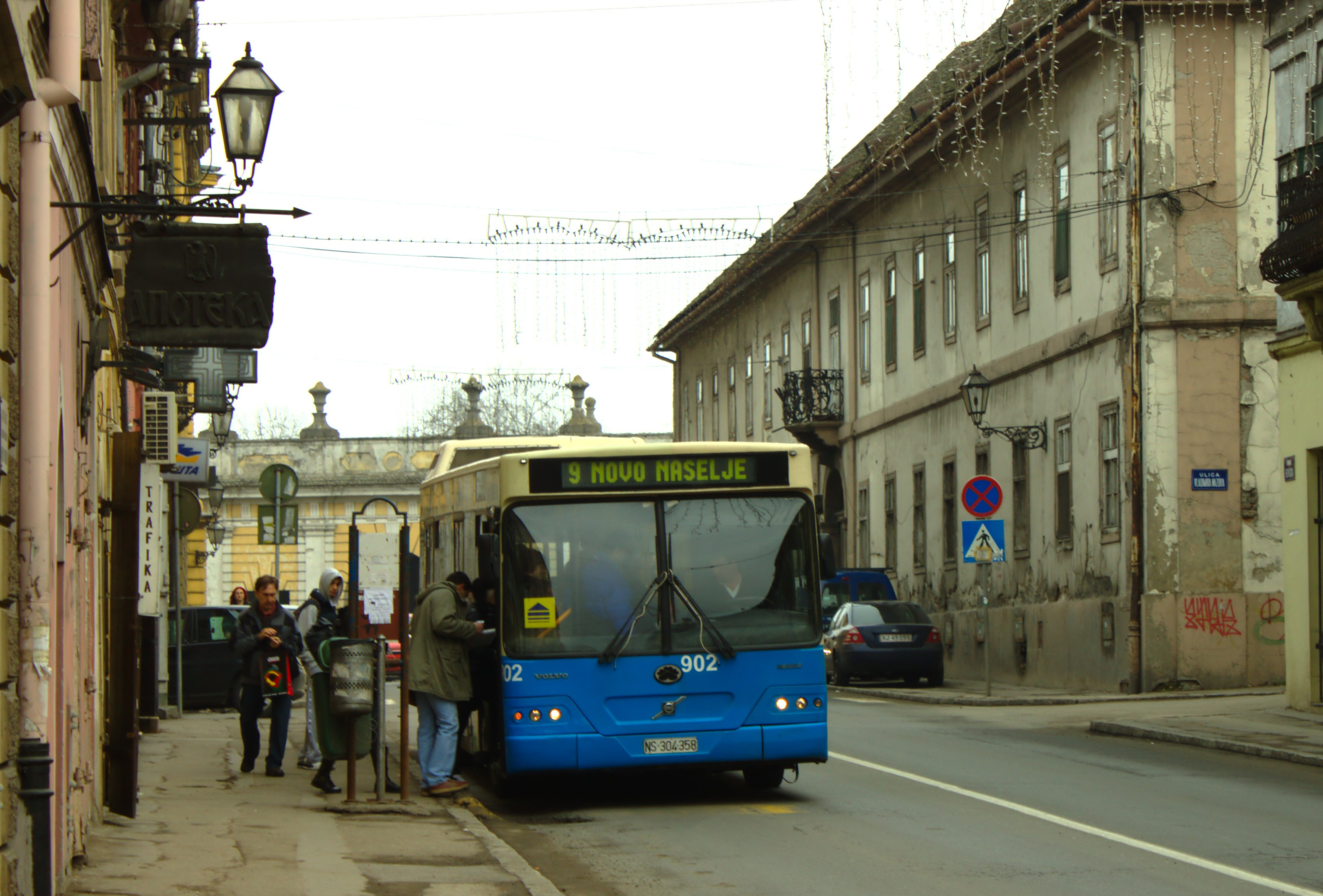
Neobus Citta SLF of JGSP Novi Sad.

- Coaches
  - Universo
  - Universo Eternal
- Intercity Buses
  - Terra
  - Terra Eternal
  - Adéquat
- Urban Buses
  - Citta LF
  - Citta LE
  - Citta SLF
  - Citta LEA
- Suburban Bus
  - Luna
- Midi Buses
  - Mercury
  - Stella

== See also ==
- List of companies of the Socialist Federal Republic of Yugoslavia
