= Čenej =

Čenej Ченеј (Serbian)
- Suburban settlement
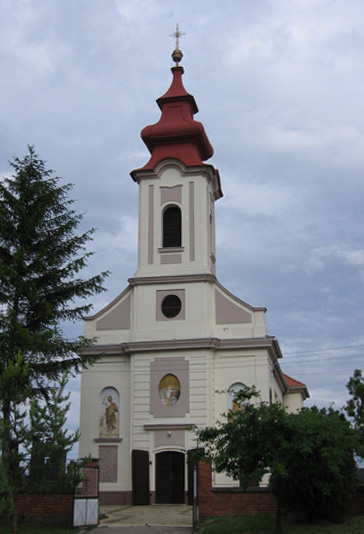
- Orthodox Church in Čenej

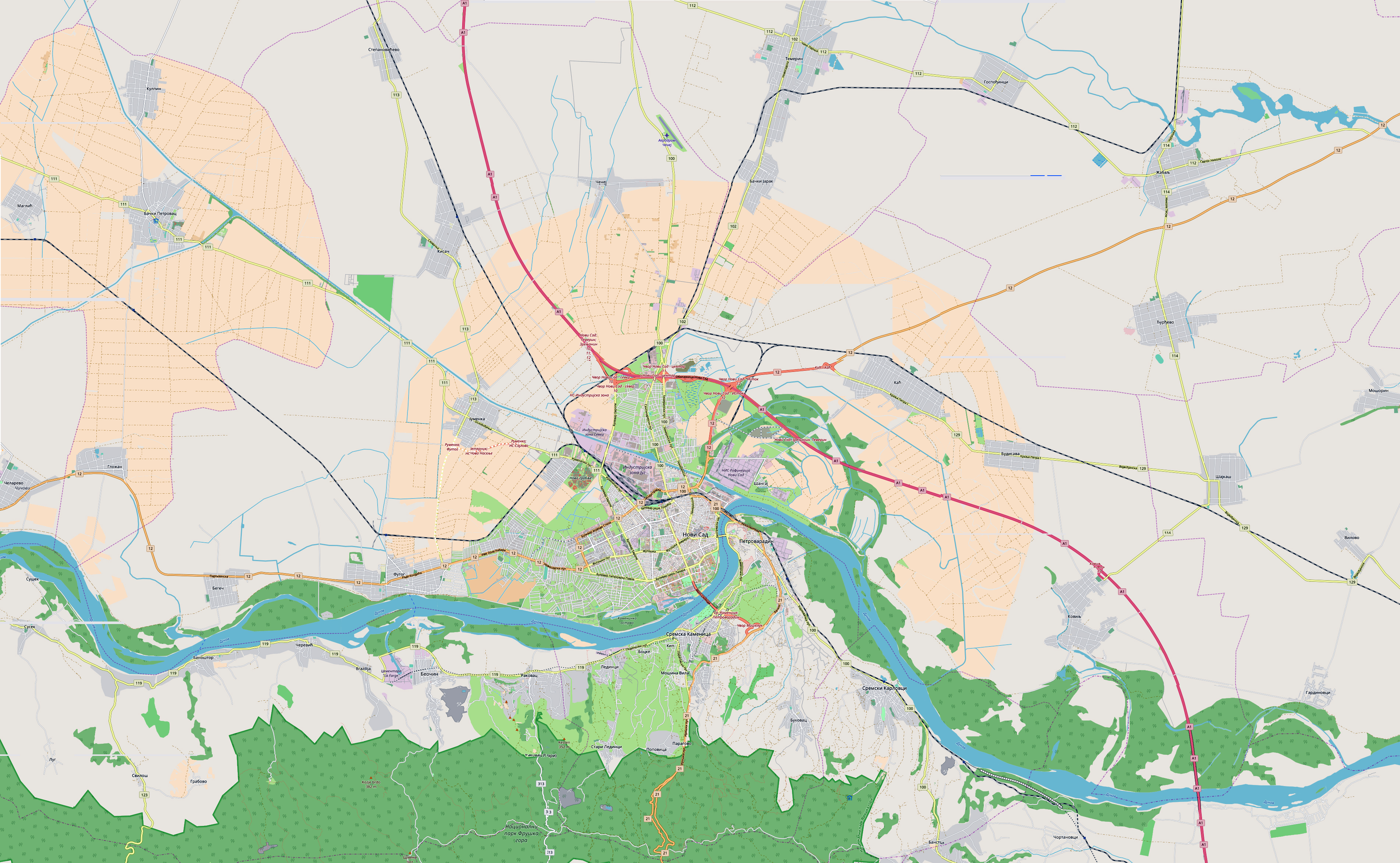
- Location within Novi Sad Čenej (Vojvodina) Čenej (Serbia)
- Coordinates: 45°22′N 19°48′E
- Country: Serbia
- Province: Vojvodina
- District: South Bačka
- Municipality: Novi Sad

Area
  - Total: 86.11 km^{2} (33.25 sq mi)

Population (2011)
  - Total: 2,125
  - Density: 24.68/km^{2} (63.92/sq mi)
- Time zone: UTC+1 (CET)
  - Summer (DST): UTC+2 (CEST)
- Area code: +381(0)21
- Car plates: NS

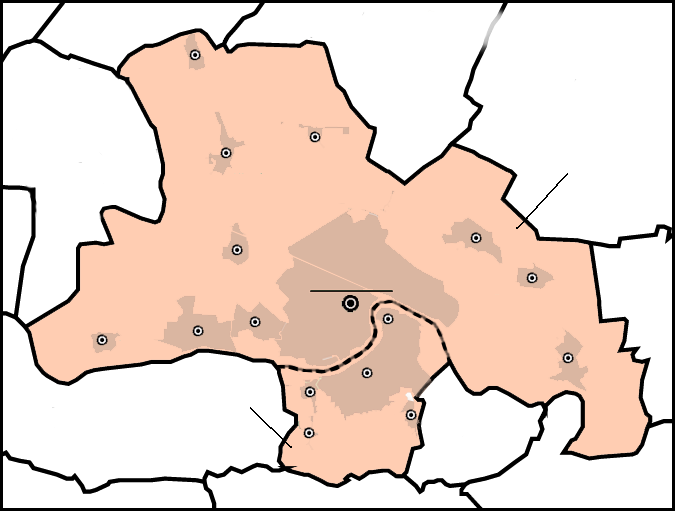

Čenej (Serbian Cyrillic: Ченеј) is a suburban settlement of the city of Novi Sad, Serbia.

== Name ==
In Serbian, the village is known as Ченеј or Čenej, in Croatian as Čenej, and in Hungarian as Csenej.

== Geography ==
It is located in the north-eastern part of the Novi Sad municipality. Two small neighbouring settlements known as Pejićevi Salaši and Nemanovci are also officially regarded as parts of Čenej.

== History and culture ==
In 1237, a settlement named terra Chemey was mentioned at this location. The modern village of Čenej emanated from the grouped farms (salaši) around the local road Bački Jarak - Zmajevo. There is a Serb Orthodox church from 1835 in the village.

The Monument to the Novi Sad Partisan Detachment is located slightly southeast of Čenej on the east side of Highway 100. The monument, consisting of three monoliths, is dedicated to the partisans executed by Hungarian authorities on this spot in July of 1941.

== Demographics ==
Historical population
Year	Pop.	±%
1948	2,278	—
1953	2,125	−6.7%
1961	2,078	−2.2%
1971	1,828	−12.0%
1981	1,686	−7.8%
1991	1,577	−6.5%
2001	2,115	+34.1%
2011	2,125	+0.5%
Source: Census

== Tourism ==
Čenej is well known in the region for its ethno tourism. There is a number of ethno farms called salaši, where visitors can relax and enjoy local food in an authentic ambiance.

There is also a small airport in the vicinity, where the more daring can go parachuting.

== See also ==
- Novi Sad
- List of places in Serbia
- List of cities, towns and villages in Vojvodina
