= Kać =

Kać Каћ (Serbian)
- Selo
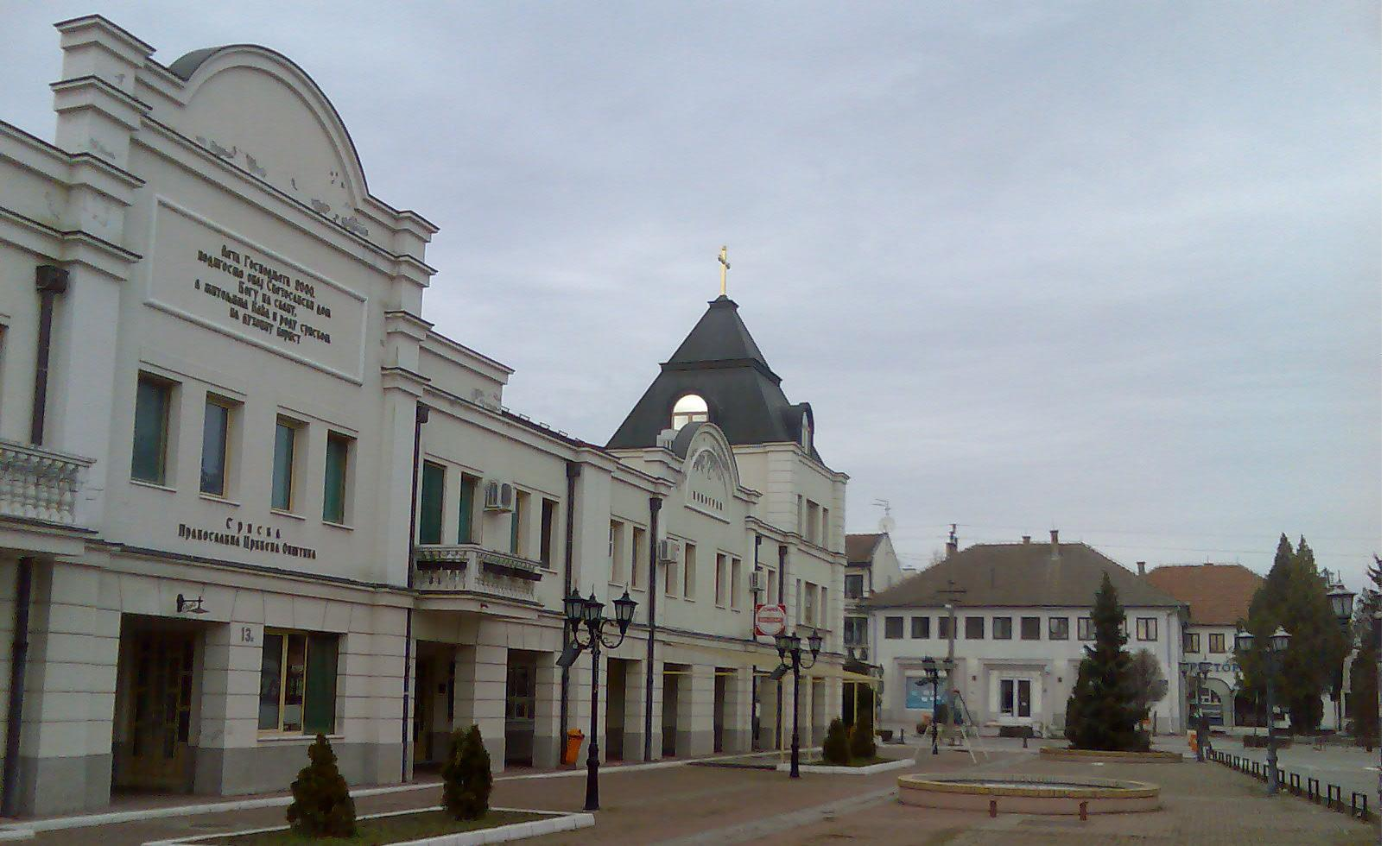
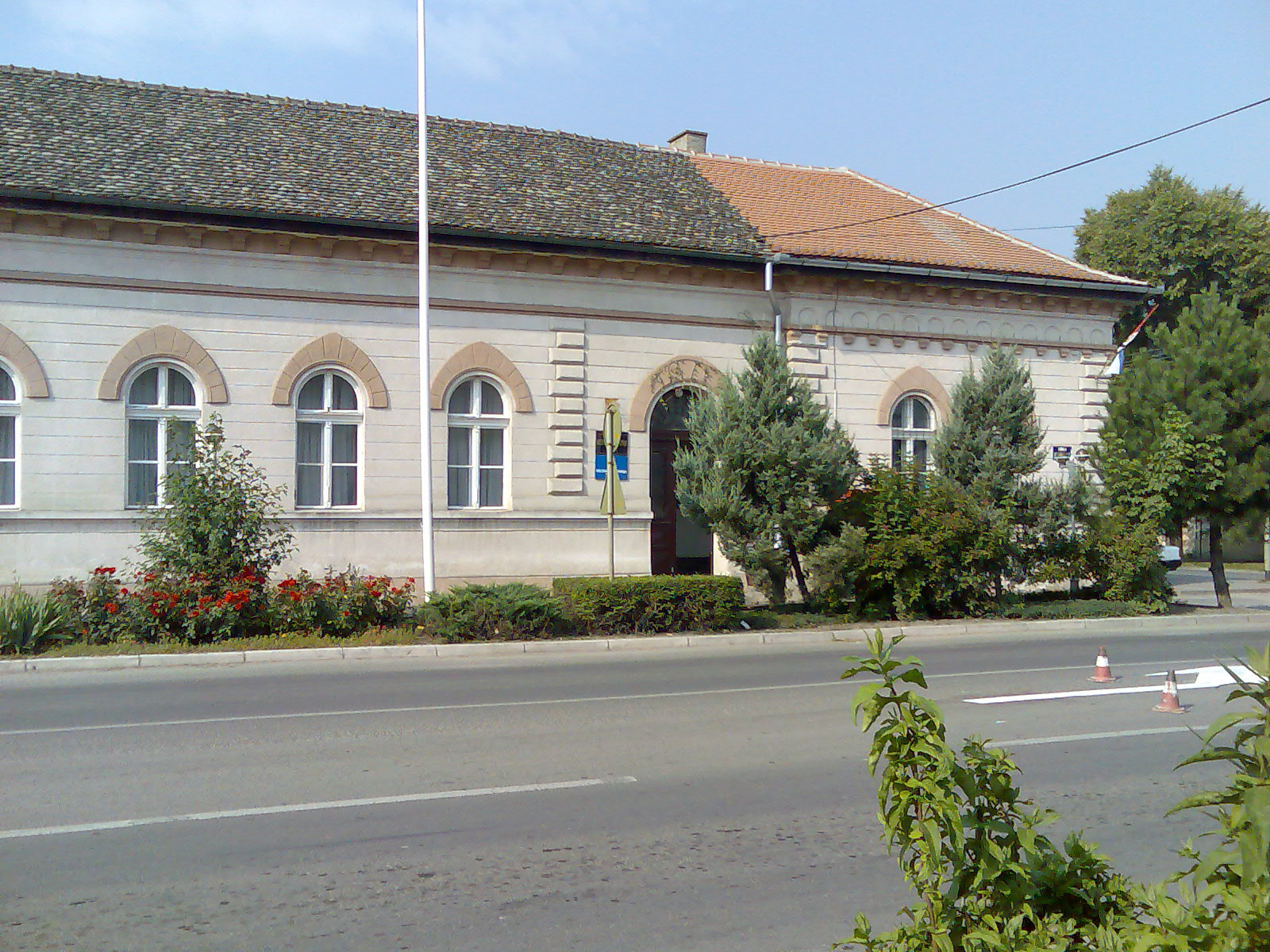
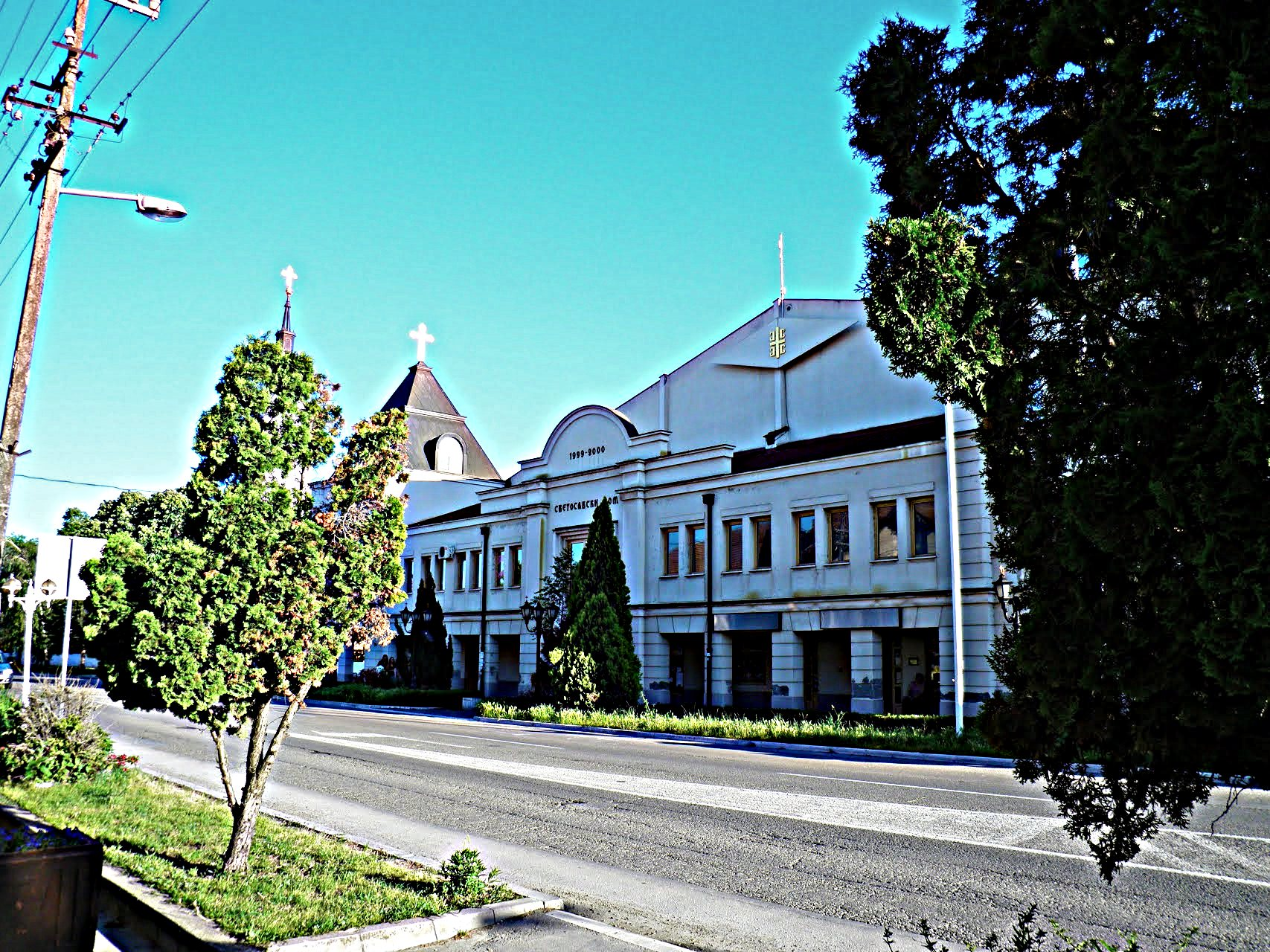
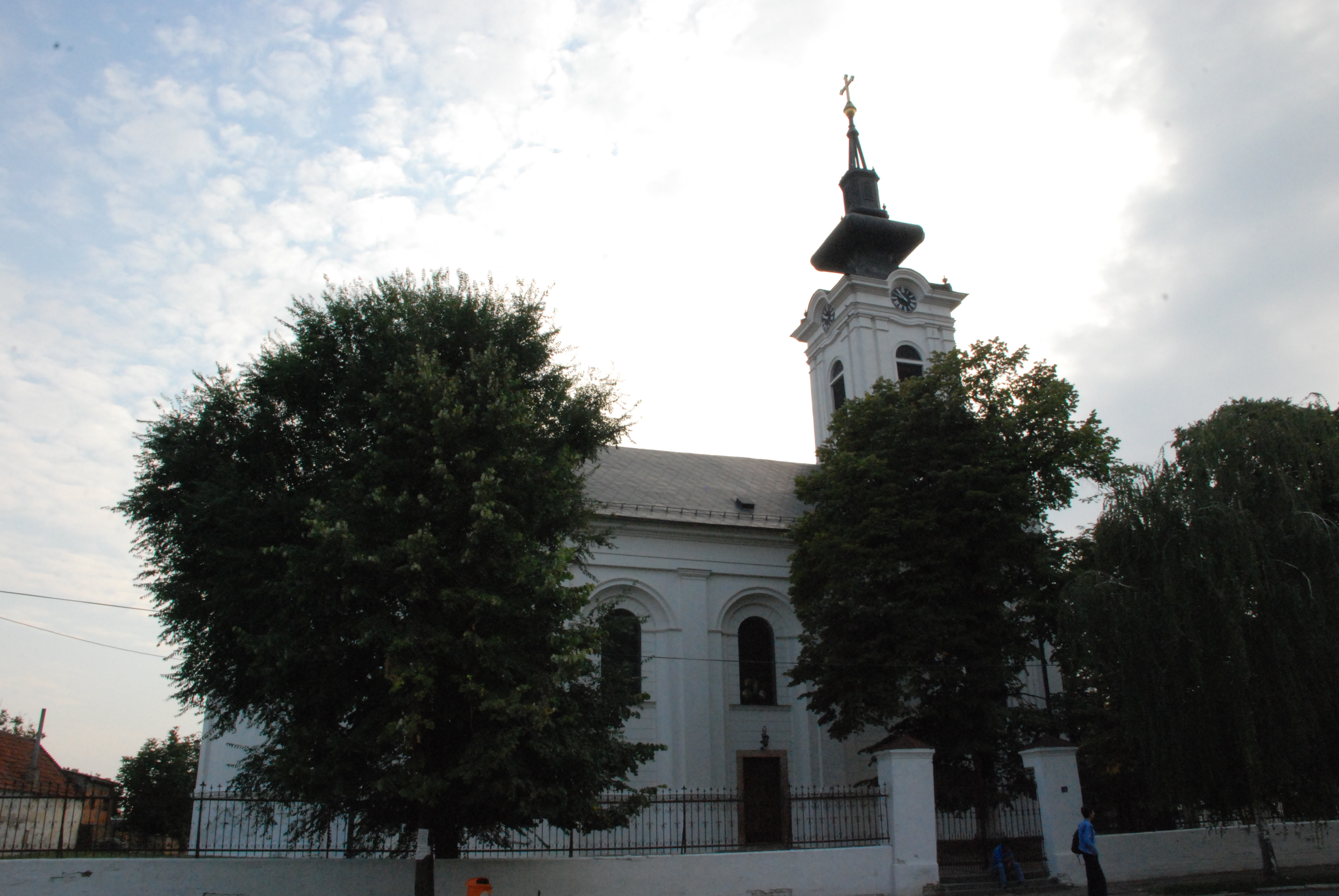
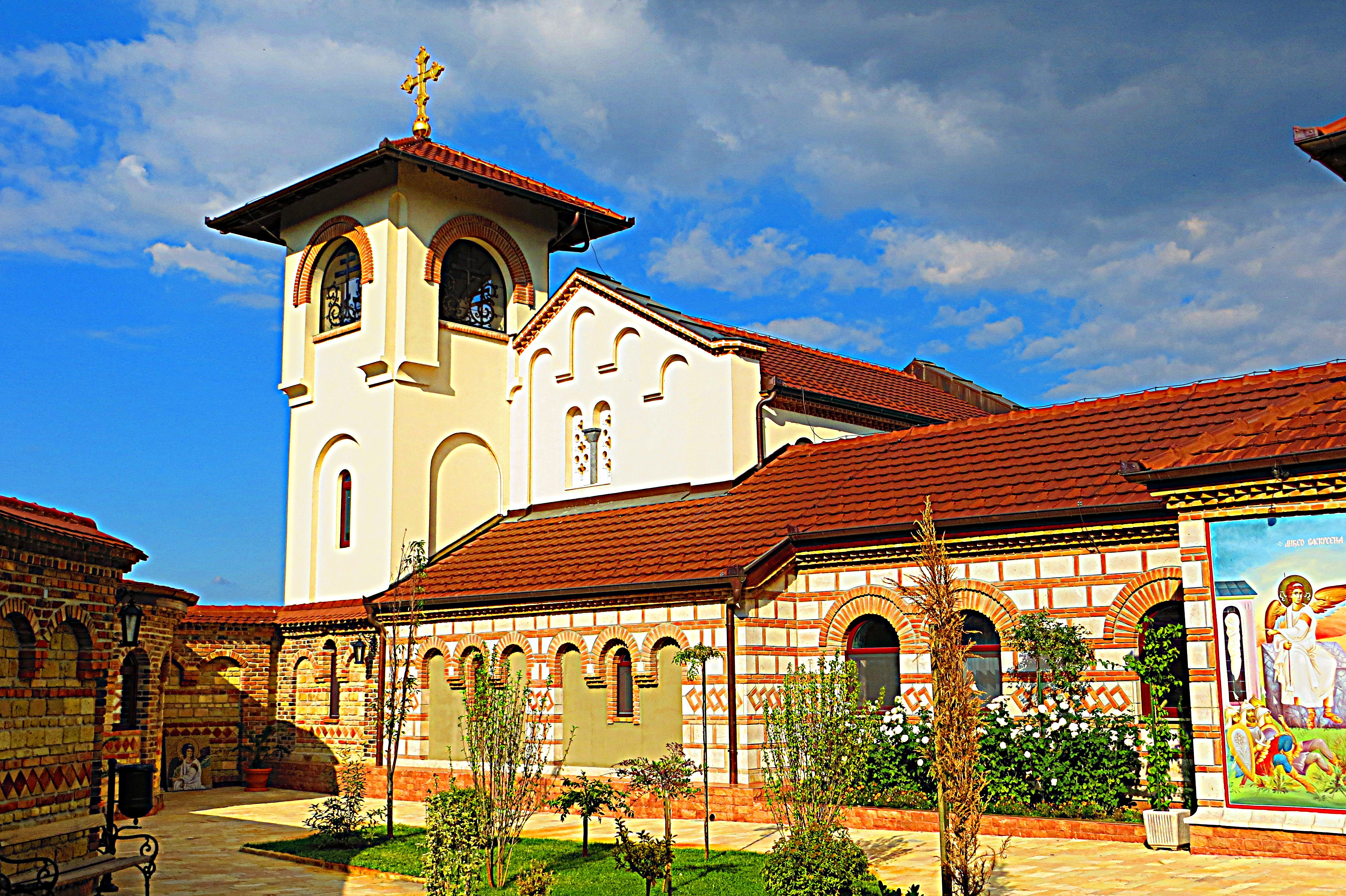
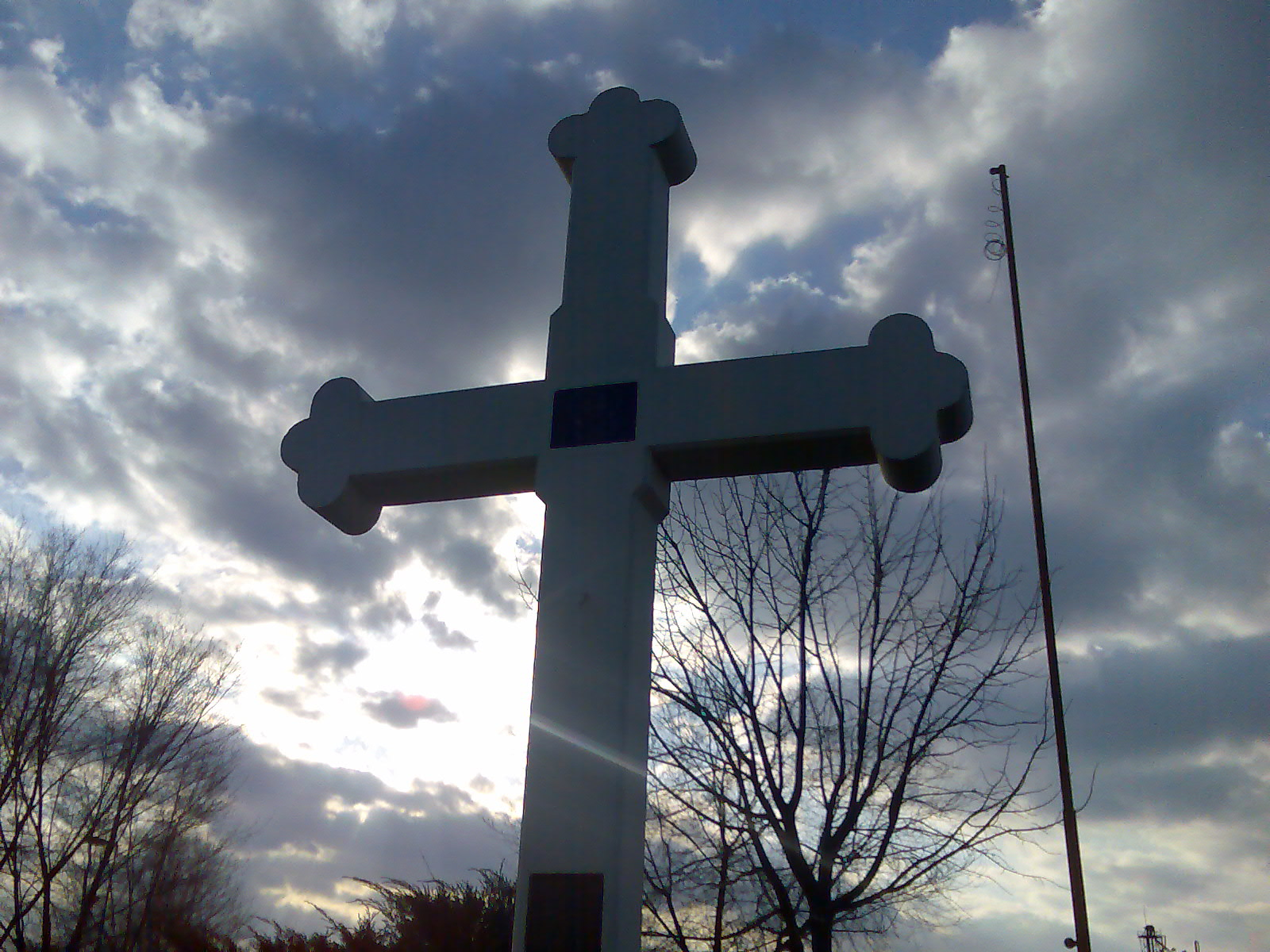
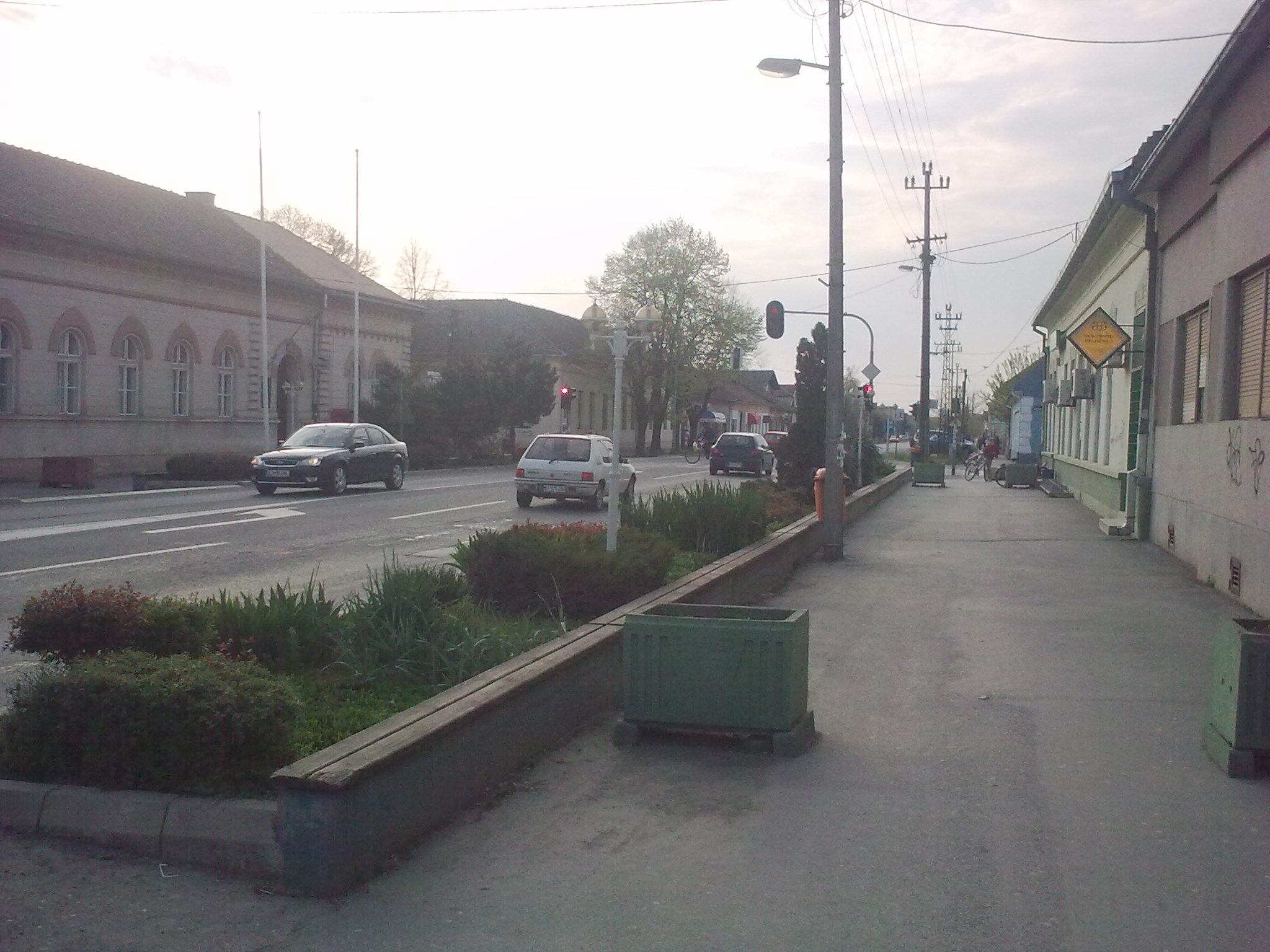
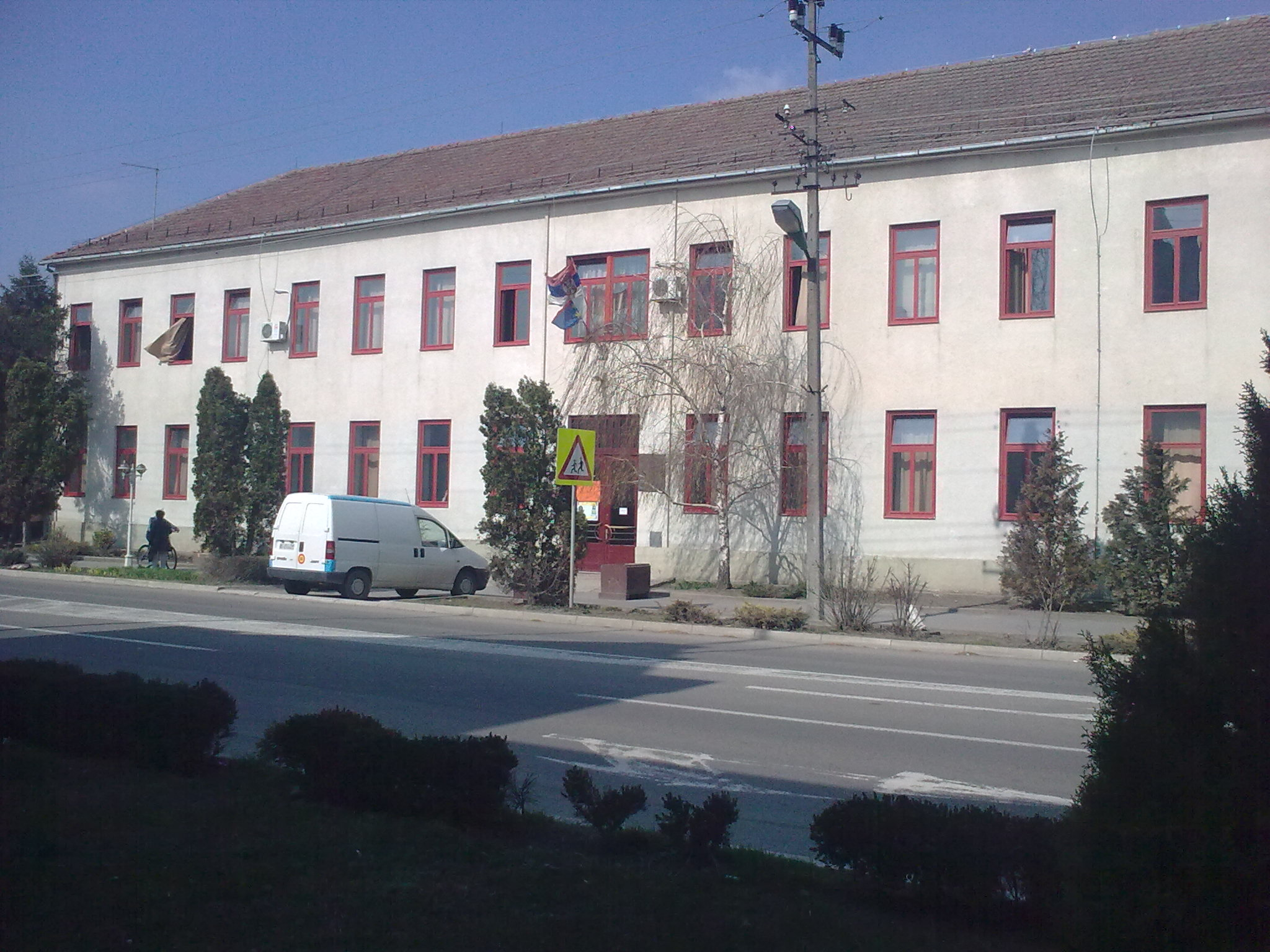
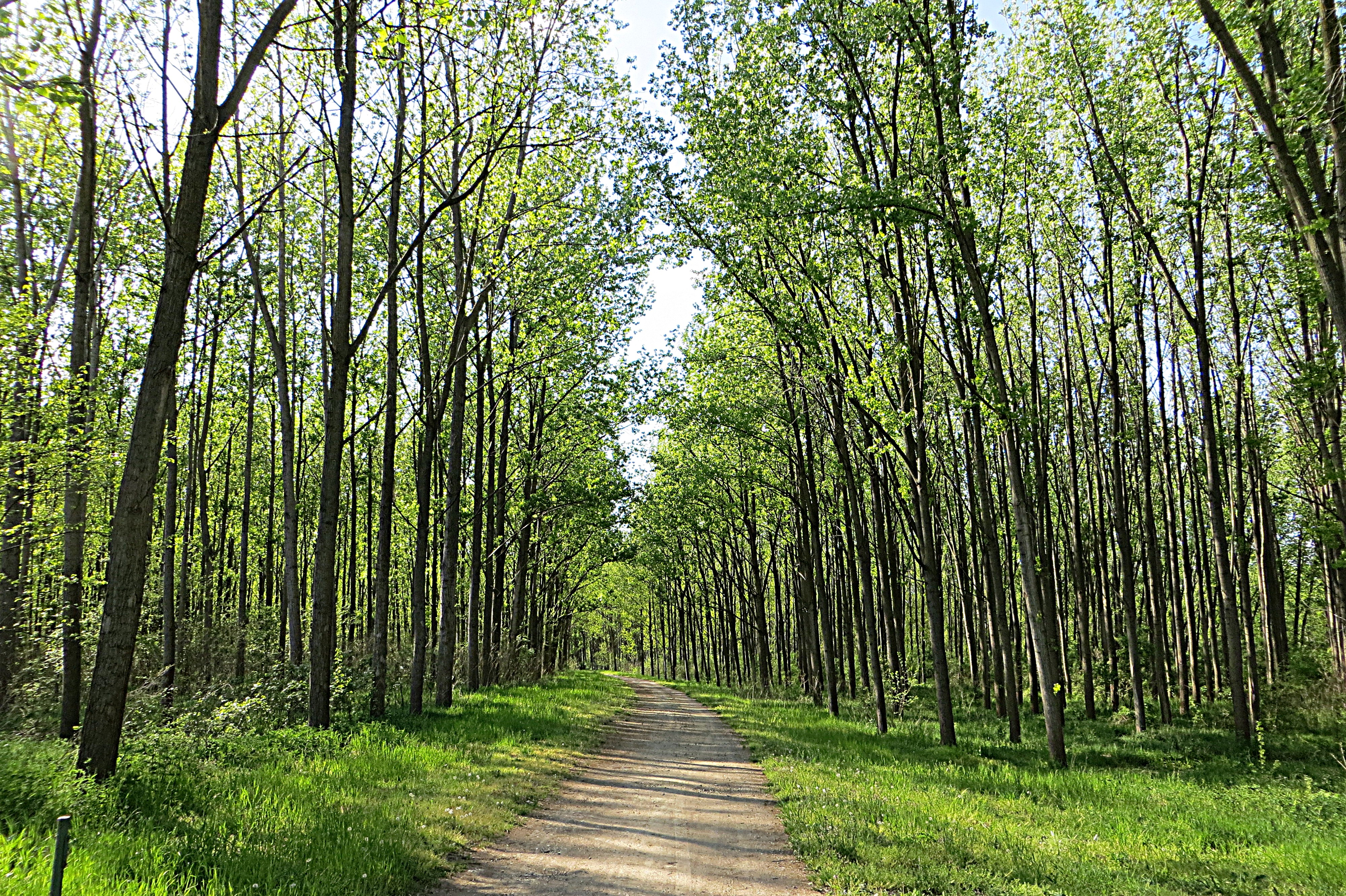
- Kać Main Square Kać Community Office St. Sava Dormitory Church of St. Nicholai Monastery of the Resurrection of Christ Kać Cross Kać Main Street Đura Jakšić Elementary School Kać Forest Kać

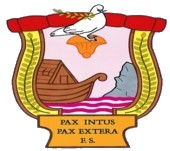
- Seal

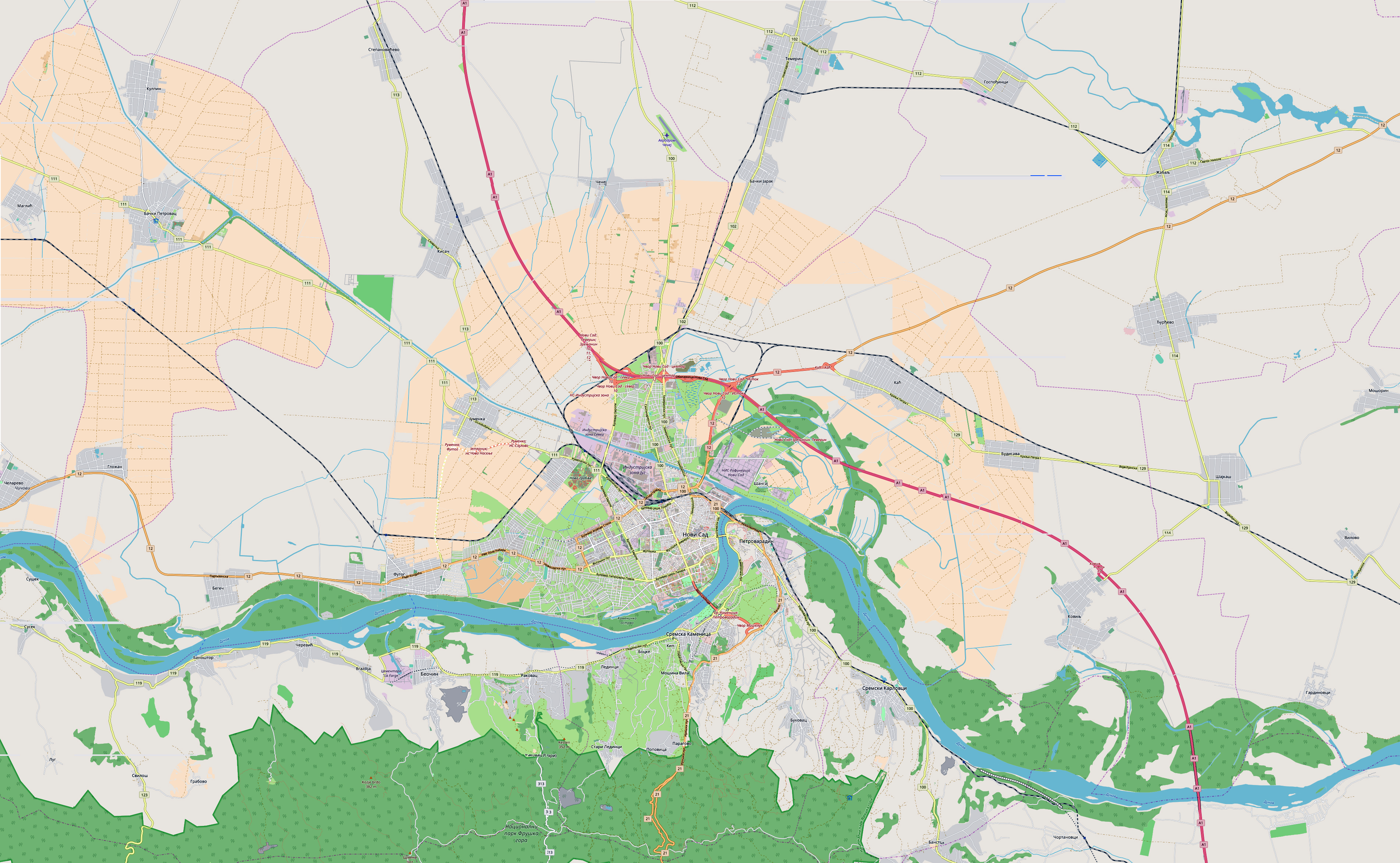
- Location within Novi Sad Kać (Vojvodina) Kać (Serbia)
- Coordinates: 45°18′N 19°57′E
- Country: Serbia
- Province: Vojvodina
- District: South Bačka
- Municipality: Novi Sad

Area
  - Total: 74.87 km^{2} (28.91 sq mi)

Population (2011)
  - Total: 11,740
  - Density: 156.8/km^{2} (406.1/sq mi)
- Time zone: UTC+1 (CET)
  - Summer (DST): UTC+2 (CEST)
- Area code: +381(0)21
- Car plates: NS

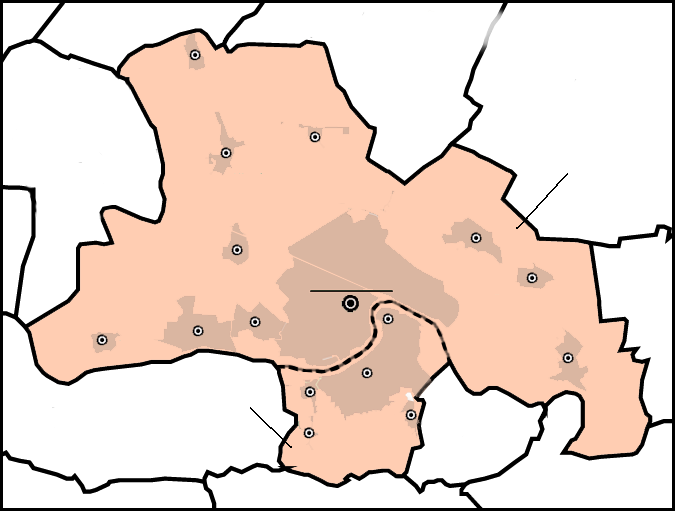

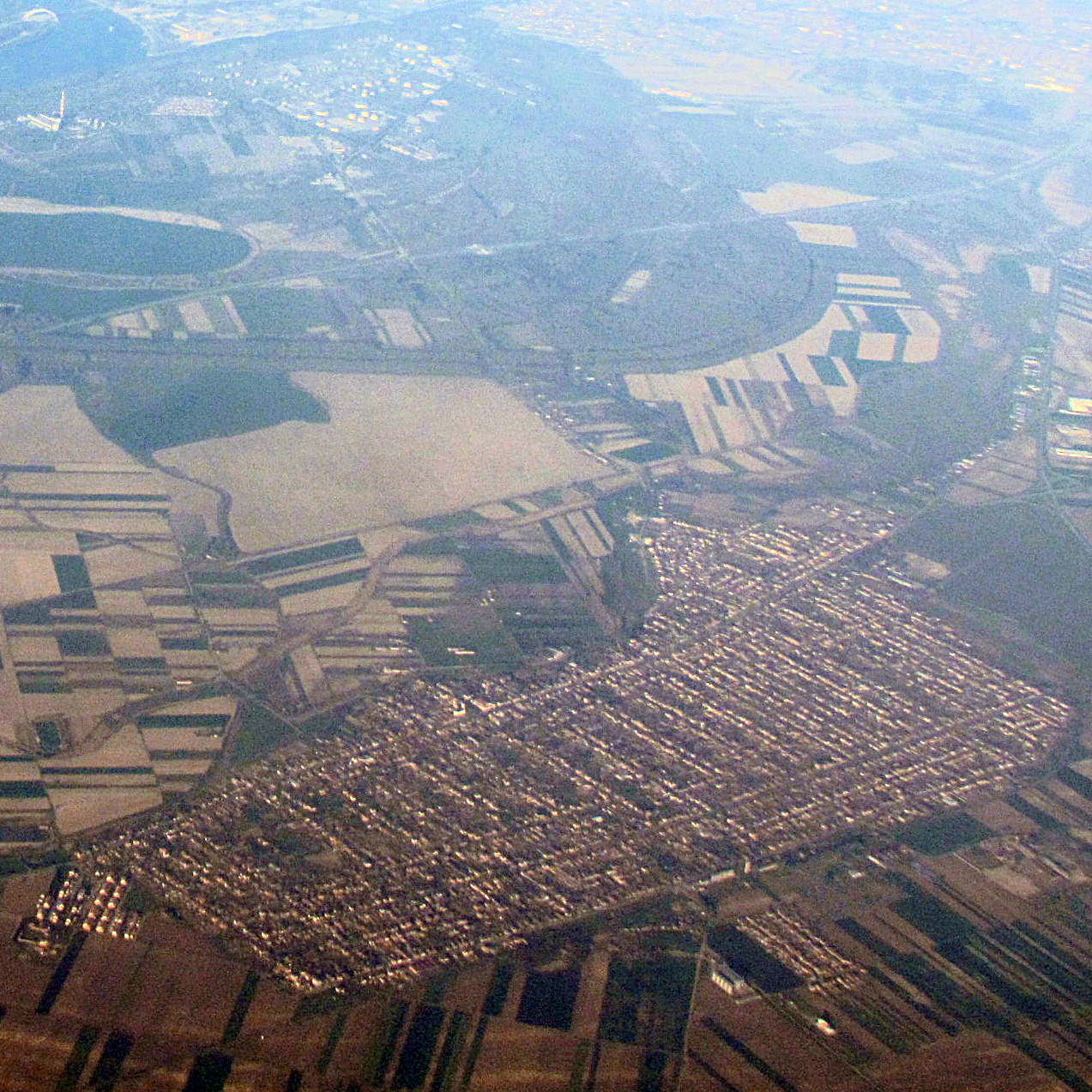
Aerial view of Kać

Kać (Serbian Cyrillic: Каћ) is a suburban settlement of the city of Novi Sad, Serbia. The town had a population of 11,612 in the 2011 census.

== Name ==
In Serbo-Croatian, the town is known as Kać or Каћ, in Hungarian as Káty, in German as Katsch, and in Rusyn as Кать.

== History ==
Kać was first mentioned during the administration of the medieval Kingdom of Hungary in 1276 as in villa Hatt, while from 1332 to 33, it was mentioned as Mathias de Shacz. During the Habsburg rule in the 18th and 19th century, the village was part of the Military Frontier (the Šajkaš Battalion section).

== Demographics ==
Historical population
Year	Pop.	±%
1948	4,406	—
1953	4,478	+1.6%
1961	5,640	+25.9%
1971	6,701	+18.8%
1981	8,551	+27.6%
1991	9,755	+14.1%
2002	11,166	+14.5%
2011	11,740	+5.1%
Source: Census

== Culture and sport ==
Jugović is a handball club from Kać. It competes in the Serbian First League of Handball since 1984. It was founded in 1956 under the name Mladost and changed its name to Jugović in 1960. Jugović won the EHF Challenge Cup in the 2000/2001 season.

There is a soccer team, also named Jugović, founded on 16 August 1912. It competes in the Novosadsko-Sremska zone League (4th League).

There is an Orthodox church from 1841 or 1844 in the suburb and a monastery named Manastir Vaskrsenja Hristova.

== New neighborhoods in Kać ==
There are two new neighborhoods in Kać, Petrovdansko Naselje and the luxurious Sunčani Breg.

== Transport ==
Kać is connected to Novi Sad by the city's bus service JGSP Novi Sad. Bus lines 22 (Kać), 23 (Budisava) and 24 (Kovilj) pass through the suburb frequently, as do other coaches to Titel, Perlez, Pančevo, Mošorin, Gardinovci and Lok.

== Notable people ==
- Mileva Marić – physicist, first wife of Albert Einstein
- Avram Miletić – poet
- Johann Lasi – pilot
- Jovo Bosančić – football player
- Stevan Curčić – politician and journalist

== See also ==
- Novi Sad
- List of places in Serbia
- List of cities, towns and villages in Vojvodina

== Sources ==
- Slobodan Ćurčić, Broj stanovnika Vojvodine, Novi Sad, 1996.
