= Meanings of minor-planet names: 121001–122000 =

As minor planet discoveries are confirmed, they are given a permanent number by the IAU's Minor Planet Center (MPC), and the discoverers can then submit names for them, following the IAU's naming conventions. The list below concerns those minor planets in the specified number-range that have received names, and explains the meanings of those names.

Official naming citations of newly named small Solar System bodies are approved and published in a bulletin by IAU's Working Group for Small Bodies Nomenclature (WGSBN). Before May 2021, citations were published in MPC's Minor Planet Circulars for many decades. Recent citations can also be found on the JPL Small-Body Database (SBDB). Until his death in 2016, German astronomer Lutz D. Schmadel compiled these citations into the Dictionary of Minor Planet Names (DMP) and regularly updated the collection.

Based on Paul Herget's The Names of the Minor Planets, Schmadel also researched the unclear origin of numerous asteroids, most of which had been named prior to World War II. This article incorporates text from this source, which is in the public domain: SBDB New namings may only be added to this list below after official publication as the preannouncement of names is condemned. The WGSBN publishes a comprehensive guideline for the naming rules of non-cometary small Solar System bodies.

== 121001–121100 ==
Named minor planet	Provisional	This minor planet was named for...	Ref · Catalog
121001 Liangshanxichang	1998 YW_{8}	Liangshan Yi Autonomous Prefecture in Sichuan province, P.R. China has a population of 5.15 million from multiple ethnic groups, including the largest population of ethnic Yi nationally. The capital of Liangshan is Xichang, where China's Chang'e-1, 2, and 3 lunar orbiters, lander and rover were launched.	JPL · 121001
121007 Jiaxingnanhu	1999 AT_{9}	"Jiaxing nanhu" are the Chinese characters for South Lake of Jiaxing City	IAU · 121007
121008 Michellecrigger	1999 AK_{10}	Michelle Crigger (born 1981) worked on the OSIRIS-REx asteroid sample-return mission as a Financial Manager. Prior to this role, she provided resource and programmatic support to the Goddard Spaceflight Center CFO Office, Astrophysics Project Division and the ExPRESS Logistics Carrier Project at NASA.	JPL · 121008
121014 Neida	1999 AJ_{22}	Inner Mongolia University (IMU，abbreviated as Neida) was founded in 1957. It is a national key university and is included in China’s “211 Project” and “Double First-class Initiative”, which have been launched by the Chinese government to support selected universities.	IAU · 121014
121016 Christopharnold	1999 BW_{3}	Christoph Arnold (1650–1695), German amateur astronomer who observed the 1690 transit of Mercury	JPL · 121016
121018 Malvinabillères	1999 BC_{6}	Malvina Billères, French physicist.	IAU · 121018
121019 Minodamato	1999 BO_{7}	Mino Damato (1937–2010), Italian astronomy communicator known for his TV series In viaggio tra le stelle ("A Journey among the Stars") in the 1970s.	JPL · 121019
121022 Galliano	1999 BR_{13}	Richard Galliano (born 1950), a French accordionist.	JPL · 121022
121032 Wadesisler	1999 BN_{33}	Wade Sisler (born 1959) is the Executive Producer at NASA's Goddard Space Flight Center. Wade supports a team of video producers, science animators, web editors, and social media wranglers in their quest to share the story of the OSIRIS-REx asteroid sample-return mission.	JPL · 121032
121089 Vyšší Brod	1999 FH_{21}	The monastery of Vyšší Brod (Hohenfurth), founded by the Rozmberks near this market town in 1259	JPL · 121089

== 121101–121200 ==
back to top

Named minor planet	Provisional	This minor planet was named for...	Ref · Catalog
121103 Ericneilsen	1999 FX_{73}	Eric Neilsen (born 1970), American astronomer with the Sloan Digital Sky Survey	JPL · 121103
121121 Koyoharugotoge	1999 HJ_{3}	Koyoharu Gotōge (born 1988) is a Japanese mangaka and the author of the manga Demon Slayer: Kimetsu no Yaiba, which inspired the realization of the popular anime series with the same name.	JPL · 121121
121132 Garydavis	1999 JB_{10}	Gary T. Davis (born 1969) contributed to the OSIRIS-REx asteroid sample-return mission as a Spacecraft Systems Engineer.	JPL · 121132
121133 Kenflurchick	1999 JN_{14}	Ken Flurchick (1951–2018) enjoyed a successful career at North Carolina A&T in the field of supercomputers. He published extensively in the fields of computational physics, astronomy, chemistry, and engineering, and also taught a wide variety of courses in these areas.	IAU · 121133

== 121201–121300 ==
back to top

Named minor planet	Provisional	This minor planet was named for...	Ref · Catalog
121211 Nikeshadavis	1999 RB_{4}	Nikesha Davis (born 1983) is the deputy lead NASA Attitude Control Analyst for the OSIRIS-REx asteroid sample-return mission. Prior to serving in this role, she worked as an Attitude Control Analyst on the Global Precipitation Measurement Mission and the proposal team for the GEDI Mission	JPL · 121211
121232 Zerin	1999 RK_{35}	ZERIN is the Center for Ries Crater and Impact Studies Nördlingen (German: Zentrum für Rieskrater- und Impaktforschung Nördlingen), a scientific institute for impact research and, in particular, documentation of the Nördlinger Ries Crater (Src).	JPL · 121232
121236 Adrianagutierrez	1999 RJ_{39}	Adriana Manrique Gutierrez (born 1986), an animator at NASA Goddard's Conceptual Image Lab. She is part of the production team working on a series of animated films for the OSIRIS-REx asteroid sample-return mission	JPL · 121236
121237 Zachdolch	1999 RK_{39}	Zachary Dolch (born 1984), a planner/scheduler for the OSIRIS-REx asteroid sample-return mission.	JPL · 121237

== 121301–121400 ==
back to top

Named minor planet	Provisional	This minor planet was named for...	Ref · Catalog
121313 Tamsin	1999 RF_{214}	Frank Tamsin (born 1964), Belgian amateur astronomer, editor of the Belgian astronomical magazine Heelal since 1998 and secretary general of the Flemish Amateur Astronomers Association (Vereniging Voor Sterrenkunde, VVS) and the Public Observatory Beisbroek (Volkssterrenwacht vzw Beisbroek/Observatoire de Beisbroek) in Bruges	JPL · 121313
121315 Mikelentz	1999 RB_{218}	Michael W. Lentz (born 1968) is an artist in the Conceptual Image Lab at GSFC. He worked for over three years to develop art and animation for the OSIRIS-REx asteroid sample-return mission to illustrate the scope and magnitude of the scientific endeavor to study the asteroid Bennu	JPL · 121315
121327 Andreweaker	1999 SL_{14}	Andrew C. Eaker (born 1961) contributed to the OSIRIS-REx asteroid sample-return mission as Project Scheduler. Prior missions include LRO (Lunar Reconnaissance Orbiter) and GLAST (Gamma-Ray Large Area Space Telescope).	JPL · 121327
121328 Devlynrfennell	1999 SZ_{14}	Devlyn R. Fennell (born 1978) contributed to the OSIRIS-REx asteroid sample-return mission on Data/Configuration Management.	JPL · 121328
121329 Getzandanner	1999 SF_{15}	Kenneth M. Getzandanner (born 1988), an Aerospace Engineer at NASA Goddard Space Flight Center, contributed to the OSIRIS-REx asteroid sample-return mission as a member of the Flight Dynamics Team.	JPL · 121329
121330 Colbygoodloe	1999 SW_{16}	Colby Goodloe (born 1982) contributed to the NASA OSIRIS-REx Asteroid Sample Return Mission as a systems engineer. Prior to the OSIRIS-REx mission, he served as an electrical engineer on many other NASA missions.	JPL · 121330
121331 Savannahsalazar	1999 SN_{22}	Savannah J. Salazar (born 1995) worked as a student employee on the OSIRIS-REx asteroid sample-return mission at the University of Arizona's Lunar and Planetary Lab, helping to organize the naming of asteroids for team members.	JPL · 121331
121332 Jasonhair	1999 SB_{24}	Jason Hair (born 1977), the Visible and near InfraRed Spectrometer Instrument Manager for the OSIRIS-REx asteroid sample-return mission, overseeing instrument development, integration and testing.	JPL · 121332
121336 Otabekburkhonov	1999 TO_{15}	Otabek Burkhonov, Uzbek astronomer who joined the Ulugh Beg Astronomical Institute in 2000 and received his Ph.D. in 2005.	IAU · 121336
121339 Žiarnadhronom	1999 TF_{6}	Žiar nad Hronom, a city in central Slovakia. With a rich history--the town's former name translated to "Holy Cross"--in modern years the city has become home to one of the most modern observatories and planetariums in the country.	IAU · 121339
121352 Taylorhale	1999 TG_{38}	Taylor Hale (born 1965) is an instrument systems engineer for the OSIRIS-REx asteroid sample-return mission. Prior to OSIRIS-REx, he was the lead engineer on the Landsat-8 Thermal Infrared Sensor instrument developed at Goddard.	JPL · 121352

== 121401–121500 ==
back to top

Named minor planet	Provisional	This minor planet was named for...	Ref · Catalog
121468 Msovinskihaskell	1999 TD_{219}	Marjorie (Sovinski) Haskell (born 1979) is the Materials and Processes Engineer for the OSIRIS-REx asteroid sample-return mission and the OVIRS instrument. Prior to OSIRIS-REx, she served as the MPE for the SMAP Radiometer and has also supported the Solar Orbiter, LCRD, and ASTRO-H programs as MPE.	JPL · 121468
121469 Sarahaugh	1999 TW_{221}	Sara Haugh (born 1970) contributed to the OSIRIS-REx asteroid sample-return mission as a Software Systems Engineer. Previously, she served as a Software Systems Engineer for the MAVEN Mission, the ISIM FSW Test Lead for the JWST Mission, and a Flight Operations Team member for the Terra and Aqua Missions.	JPL · 121469
121479 Hendershot	1999 TM_{236}	James Hendershot (born 1957), the Payload Team Instrument Manager at Goddard Space Flight Center for the OCAMS and OTES instruments on the OSIRIS-REx asteroid sample-return mission.	JPL · 121479
121480 Dolanhighsmith	1999 TH_{240}	Dolan E. Highsmith (born 1970) contributed to the Navigation Teams of the ESA Mars Express mission and the NASA MRO, MSL, MAVEN and OSIRIS-REx asteroid sample-return mission.	JPL · 121480
121481 Reganhoward	1999 TY_{240}	Regan Howard (born 1948) contributed to the OSIRIS-REx asteroid sample-return mission as the Electromagnetics Compatibility Lead. He is a member of the MAVEN flight team. He was a systems engineer on the MAVEN Mars Scout mission and on the development teams for the Dawn, MESSENGER and ICESat-1 missions.	JPL · 121481
121483 Griffinjayne	1999 TO_{242}	Griffin Owen Jayne (born 1992) contributed to the OSIRIS-REx asteroid sample-return mission as Contamination Control Engineer. He also works as a Thermal Coatings Development Engineer, helping to improve existing coatings and develop new coatings to better meet mission thermal requirements.	JPL · 121483
121486 Sarahkirby	1999 TX_{245}	Sarah Kirby Smith (born 1982) is the Earned Value Management Specialist for the OSIRIS-REx asteroid sample-return mission. She also worked at the Naval Air Systems Command on the F35 Joint Strike Fighter and at Lockheed Martin on the Littoral Combat Ship and Non-Line of Sight Launch System projects.	JPL · 121486

== 121501–121600 ==
back to top

Named minor planet	Provisional	This minor planet was named for...	Ref · Catalog
121505 Andrewliounis	1999 TC_{296}	Andrew J. Liounis (born 1991) contributed to the OSIRIS-REx asteroid sample-return mission as an Optical Navigation engineer.	JPL · 121505
121506 Chrislorentson	1999 TA_{300}	C. Chris Lorentson (born 1968) contributed to the OSIRIS-REx asteroid sample-return mission, Lunar Reconnaissance Orbiter, Mars Science Laboratory, Hubble Space Telescope, SWIFT, GLAST and Cassini Missions as a Contamination Control Engineer for NASA-Goddard Space Flight Center.	JPL · 121506
121536 Brianburt	1999 UY_{46}	Brian J. Burt (born 1987) is a software developer at Lowell Observatory (Flagstaff, AZ). His research includes spectroscopic studies of asteroids and he has made significant contributions to the MITHNEOS and MANOS near-earth asteroid spectral surveys.	IAU · 121536
121537 Lorenzdavid	1999 UG_{48}	David Lorenz (born 1958) is the Touch and Go Campaign lead for the OSIRIS-REx asteroid sample-return mission. David was responsible for returning Landsat-4 to full operations following an on-orbit failure. He has worked on the Solar Max Repair Mission, the UARS mission and various GOES spacecraft	JPL · 121537
121540 Jamesmarsh	1999 UU_{51}	Jimmy Marsh (born 1969) contributed to the OSIRIS-REx asteroid sample-return mission as Proposal Manager.	JPL · 121540
121542 Alindamashiku	1999 UW_{56}	Alinda K. Mashiku (born 1982), an aerospace engineer at NASA's Goddard Space Flight Center, is a member of the Flight Dynamics Team for the OSIRIS-REx asteroid sample-return mission, investigating nonlinear and hybrid estimation techniques for statistical orbit determination and aerocapture analysis.	JPL · 121542
121546 Straulino	1999 VU_{11}	Samuele Straulino (b. 1970), an Italian professor of physics at the University of Florence.	IAU · 121546
121547 Fenghuotongxin	1999 VS_{20}	Fenghuotongxin are the Chinese characters for "beacon" and "communication". A beacon, which utilizes a fire burning atop a hill or tower to send visual signals, is an ancient communication method documented as early as 781 BC. in China. Ancient beacon towers are still retained on the Great Wall and in some cities.	JPL · 121547
121557 Paulmason	1999 VF_{44}	Paul Mason (born 1966) is the lead NASA Attitude Control Analyst for the OSIRIS-REx asteroid sample-return mission. He also worked as an Attitude Control Analyst on the Solar Dynamics Observatory, LADEE, and SPIRIT Missions to name a few	JPL · 121557
121593 Kevinmiller	1999 VY_{114}	Kevin Miller (born 1957) contributed to the OSIRIS-REx asteroid sample-return mission as a member of the proposal team then as the first Deputy Project Manager/Resources. He has worked for NASA Goddard Space Flight Center since 1989 in project management on numerous space flight missions.	JPL · 121593
121594 Zubritsky	1999 VD_{115}	Elizabeth Zubritsky (born 1967) supports the OSIRIS-REx asteroid sample-return mission at NASA's Goddard Space Flight Center by writing news releases and assisting with media relations. She serves the planetary science community by promoting fundamental research and missions like OSIRIS-REx, MAVEN and LRO	JPL · 121594

== 121601–121700 ==
back to top

Named minor planet	Provisional	This minor planet was named for...	Ref · Catalog
121608 Mikemoreau	1999 VL_{144}	Michael C. Moreau (born 1972), an engineer at NASA's Goddard Space Flight Center, leads the Navigation Team for the OSIRIS-REx asteroid sample-return mission. He grew up on a dairy farm in Vermont, and is known for his contributions to techniques for autonomous spacecraft navigation	JPL · 121608
121609 Josephnicholas	1999 VV_{144}	Joseph B. Nicholas (born 1988) contributed to the OSIRIS-REx asteroid sample-return mission as tracking data analysis algorithm developer. He has also worked on developing high-degree lunar gravity fields as part of the GRAIL gravity team at NASA GSFC	JPL · 121609
121615 Marknoteware	1999 VC_{154}	Mark D. Noteware (born 1958) contributed to the OSIRIS-REx asteroid sample-return mission as Mission Assurance Engineer. He served previously as Senior Quality Engineer for DSCOVR program, Advanced Seal Delivery System Quality Engineer, and Bio-Detection System Quality Engineer.	JPL · 121615
121631 Josephnuth	1999 VO_{196}	Joseph A. Nuth (born 1953) contributed to the OSIRIS-REx asteroid sample-return mission as Deputy Project Scientist, and is the Senior Scientist for Primitive Bodies at Goddard Space Flight Center. He served as Chief of the GSFC Astrochemistry Lab and Discipline Scientist for the Origins of Solar Systems Programs.	JPL · 121631
121633 Ronperison	1999 VO_{197}	Ronald Perison (born 1962) contributed to the OSIRIS-REx asteroid sample-return mission as the Chief Safety and Mission Assurance Officer. His 28 years of aerospace experience in aircraft and satellite systems includes the USAF, Johns Hopkins University and NASA on the TIMED, Hubble Space Telescope and THEMIS missions.	JPL · 121633
121637 Druscillaperry	1999 VR_{210}	Druscilla D. Perry (born 1961) is the OVIRS Resource Analyst for the OSIRIS-REx asteroid sample-return mission. She was also part of the Resources Team for the Magnetospheric Multiscale Mission and a Financial Analyst for the Multidisciplinary Engineering and Technology Support Contract as part of the Business Management Office Team	JPL · 121637
121654 Michaelpryzby	1999 XY_{2}	Michael S. Pryzby (born 1967) is the Instrument Systems Engineer on the OSIRIS-REx asteroid sample-return mission. Prior to this, he was the Lead Spacecraft Systems Engineer on the Lunar Reconnaissance Orbiter. In his career, he has supported NASA GSFC for over 25 years	JPL · 121654
121655 Nitapszcolka	1999 XY_{4}	Nita Aanderud Pszcolka (born 1965) is the Project Support Manager for the OSIRIS-REx asteroid sample-return mission. She is a member of the Goddard business support team utilizing project support skills and techniques for the planning, direction, coordination and evaluation of all project support activities	JPL · 121655
121656 Jamesrogers	1999 XM_{5}	James E. Rogers (born 1964) is the Planning and Scheduling Lead for the OSIRIS-REx asteroid sample-return mission. He also was the Planning and Scheduling Lead for the TDRS K/L and STEREO Missions, and a Scheduling Team Member on several Hubble Servicing Missions.	JPL · 121656
121659 Blairrussell	1999 XX_{10}	Blair Russell (born 1970) provided mechanical engineering oversight of hardware development for the OSIRIS-REx asteroid sample-return mission. Working closely with spacecraft and instrument teams, he ensured a robust, structurally sound mechanical system. Prior to this work he supported the GPM and JWST Missions.	JPL · 121659

== 121701–121800 ==
back to top

Named minor planet	Provisional	This minor planet was named for...	Ref · Catalog
121715 Katiesalamy	1999 XC_{120}	Katie Baumann Salamy (born 1985), the Mechanical Systems Division Lead Secretary at NASA Goddard Space Flight Center.	JPL · 121715
121716 Victorsank	1999 XL_{122}	Victor J. Sank (born 1944), the radio-frequency communications System Lead for the OSIRIS-REx asteroid sample-return mission.	JPL · 121716
121717 Josephschepis	1999 XA_{123}	Named in appreciation of Joseph P. Schepis (born 1960), whose accomplishments include numerous structures and mechanisms used in space science and Earth science missions. He contributed to the OSIRIS-REx asteroid sample-return mission as the Mechanical System Lead.	JPL · 121717
121718 Ashleyscroggins	1999 XE_{125}	Ashley R. Scroggins (born 1984) worked on the OSIRIS-REx asteroid sample-return mission as a Propulsion Engineer. She also supported the GEDI, DSCOVR, GPM, Glory, LRO and SDO missions as a Propulsion Engineer at NASA Goddard Spaceflight Center	JPL · 121718
121719 Georgeshaw	1999 XW_{126}	George B. Shaw (born 1966) contributed to the OSIRIS-REx asteroid sample-return mission as Laser Systems Lead. Prior to serving in this role, he was Laser Transmitter Lead Engineer for the LOLA instrument on the NASA LRO Mission.	JPL · 121719
121725 Aphidas	1999 XX_{143}	Aphidas (or Apheidas) is a centaur from Greek mythology who remained in a drunken sleep during the battle between the Centaurs and Lapiths The Lapith Phorbas killed Aphidas with a thrown spear while he slept.	JPL · 121725
121756 Sotomejias	1999 XA_{257}	Vanessa Soto-Mejias (born 1982) contributed to the OSIRIS-REx asteroid sample-return mission as Resource Analyst.	JPL · 121756

== 121801–121900 ==
back to top

Named minor planet	Provisional	This minor planet was named for...	Ref · Catalog
121817 Szatmáry	2000 AP_{246}	Károly Szatmáry (born 1956), Hungarian astronomer	JPL · 121817
121865 Dauvergne	2000 CT_{80}	Jean Luc Dauvergne (born 1976), French scientific journalist	JPL · 121865

== 121901–122000 ==
back to top

Named minor planet	Provisional	This minor planet was named for...	Ref · Catalog
There are no named minor planets in this number range

back to top

Preceded by 120,001–121,000	Meanings of minor-planet names List of minor planets: 121,001–122,000	Succeeded by 122,001–123,000
