= List of minor planets: 121001–122000 =

The following is a partial list of minor planets, running from minor-planet number 121001 through 122000, inclusive. The primary data for this and other partial lists is based on JPL's "Small-Body Orbital Elements" and data available from the Minor Planet Center. Critical list information is also provided by the MPC, unless otherwise specified from Lowell Observatory. A detailed description of the table's columns and additional sources are given on the main page including a complete list of every page in this series, and a statistical break-up on the dynamical classification of minor planets.

Also see the summary list of all named bodies in numerical and alphabetical order, and the corresponding naming citations for the number range of this particular list. New namings may only be added to this list after official publication, as the preannouncement of names is condemned by the Working Group for Small Bodies Nomenclature of the International Astronomical Union.

Near-Earth obj.	MBA (inner)	MBA (outer)	Centaur
Mars-crosser	MBA (middle)	Jupiter trojan	Trans-Neptunian obj.
Unclassified

== 121001–121100 ==
Designation			Discovery			Properties		Ref
Permanent	Provisional	Named after	Date	Site	Discoverer(s)	Category	Diam.	Ref
121001 Liangshanxichang	1998 YW_{8}	Liangshanxichang	December 22, 1998	Xinglong	SCAP	·	1.2 km	MPC · JPL
121002	1998 YZ_{15}	—	December 22, 1998	Kitt Peak	Spacewatch	·	1.4 km	MPC · JPL
121003	1998 YT_{19}	—	December 25, 1998	Kitt Peak	Spacewatch	·	2.0 km	MPC · JPL
121004	1998 YQ_{27}	—	December 29, 1998	Ondřejov	L. Kotková	·	1.3 km	MPC · JPL
121005	1998 YM_{31}	—	December 22, 1998	Kitt Peak	Spacewatch	HIL · 3:2	10 km	MPC · JPL
121006	1999 AG_{1}	—	January 7, 1999	Kitt Peak	Spacewatch	·	2.4 km	MPC · JPL
121007 Jiaxingnanhu	1999 AT_{9}	Jiaxingnanhu	January 10, 1999	Xinglong	SCAP	·	1.4 km	MPC · JPL
121008 Michellecrigger	1999 AK_{10}	Michellecrigger	January 14, 1999	Catalina	CSS	PHO	1.9 km	MPC · JPL
121009	1999 AV_{10}	—	January 7, 1999	Kitt Peak	Spacewatch	·	6.2 km	MPC · JPL
121010	1999 AG_{18}	—	January 11, 1999	Kitt Peak	Spacewatch	·	1.2 km	MPC · JPL
121011	1999 AW_{18}	—	January 13, 1999	Kitt Peak	Spacewatch	·	2.4 km	MPC · JPL
121012	1999 AP_{19}	—	January 13, 1999	Kitt Peak	Spacewatch	·	1.9 km	MPC · JPL
121013	1999 AG_{21}	—	January 13, 1999	Višnjan Observatory	K. Korlević	·	1.6 km	MPC · JPL
121014 Neida	1999 AJ_{22}	Neida	January 13, 1999	Xinglong	SCAP	·	1.9 km	MPC · JPL
121015	1999 AO_{27}	—	January 10, 1999	Kitt Peak	Spacewatch	NYS	1.8 km	MPC · JPL
121016 Christopharnold	1999 BW_{3}	Christopharnold	January 18, 1999	Drebach	J. Kandler	·	2.2 km	MPC · JPL
121017	1999 BG_{4}	—	January 19, 1999	San Marcello	A. Boattini, M. Tombelli	·	3.8 km	MPC · JPL
121018 Malvinabillères	1999 BC_{6}	Malvinabillères	January 20, 1999	Caussols	ODAS	·	3.7 km	MPC · JPL
121019 Minodamato	1999 BO_{7}	Minodamato	January 20, 1999	Campo Catino	F. Mallia, M. Di Sora	·	1.6 km	MPC · JPL
121020	1999 BV_{8}	—	January 22, 1999	Višnjan Observatory	K. Korlević	·	1.6 km	MPC · JPL
121021	1999 BB_{13}	—	January 24, 1999	Višnjan Observatory	K. Korlević	NYS	1.4 km	MPC · JPL
121022 Galliano	1999 BR_{13}	Galliano	January 20, 1999	Caussols	ODAS	NYS	1.8 km	MPC · JPL
121023	1999 BV_{25}	—	January 18, 1999	Socorro	LINEAR	·	2.2 km	MPC · JPL
121024	1999 BK_{26}	—	January 16, 1999	Kitt Peak	Spacewatch	·	1.1 km	MPC · JPL
121025	1999 BV_{26}	—	January 16, 1999	Kitt Peak	Spacewatch	·	1.1 km	MPC · JPL
121026	1999 BH_{27}	—	January 16, 1999	Kitt Peak	Spacewatch	NYS	1.8 km	MPC · JPL
121027	1999 BS_{27}	—	January 17, 1999	Kitt Peak	Spacewatch	V	990 m	MPC · JPL
121028	1999 BB_{29}	—	January 18, 1999	Kitt Peak	Spacewatch	V	1.5 km	MPC · JPL
121029	1999 BL_{29}	—	January 18, 1999	Kitt Peak	Spacewatch	·	1.9 km	MPC · JPL
121030	1999 BM_{29}	—	January 18, 1999	Kitt Peak	Spacewatch	NYS	1.7 km	MPC · JPL
121031	1999 BU_{30}	—	January 19, 1999	Kitt Peak	Spacewatch	·	1.3 km	MPC · JPL
121032 Wadesisler	1999 BN_{33}	Wadesisler	January 23, 1999	Catalina	CSS	·	1.2 km	MPC · JPL
121033	1999 CU	—	February 5, 1999	Oizumi	T. Kobayashi	NYS	1.8 km	MPC · JPL
121034	1999 CF_{1}	—	February 6, 1999	Oizumi	T. Kobayashi	·	2.4 km	MPC · JPL
121035	1999 CP_{3}	—	February 10, 1999	Socorro	LINEAR	PHO	2.9 km	MPC · JPL
121036	1999 CH_{6}	—	February 10, 1999	Socorro	LINEAR	PHO	2.9 km	MPC · JPL
121037	1999 CV_{6}	—	February 10, 1999	Socorro	LINEAR	PHO	2.4 km	MPC · JPL
121038	1999 CU_{10}	—	February 12, 1999	Socorro	LINEAR	PHO	3.7 km	MPC · JPL
121039	1999 CQ_{11}	—	February 12, 1999	Socorro	LINEAR	PHO	2.1 km	MPC · JPL
121040	1999 CP_{13}	—	February 14, 1999	Caussols	ODAS	·	1.9 km	MPC · JPL
121041	1999 CD_{15}	—	February 11, 1999	Socorro	LINEAR	PHO	4.3 km	MPC · JPL
121042	1999 CA_{16}	—	February 11, 1999	Socorro	LINEAR	PHO	3.5 km	MPC · JPL
121043	1999 CD_{24}	—	February 10, 1999	Socorro	LINEAR	·	1.7 km	MPC · JPL
121044	1999 CM_{26}	—	February 10, 1999	Socorro	LINEAR	·	1.2 km	MPC · JPL
121045	1999 CV_{29}	—	February 10, 1999	Socorro	LINEAR	HIL · 3:2 · (6124)	9.5 km	MPC · JPL
121046	1999 CD_{34}	—	February 10, 1999	Socorro	LINEAR	·	1.9 km	MPC · JPL
121047	1999 CM_{41}	—	February 10, 1999	Socorro	LINEAR	·	2.5 km	MPC · JPL
121048	1999 CF_{42}	—	February 10, 1999	Socorro	LINEAR	BAP	2.6 km	MPC · JPL
121049	1999 CD_{46}	—	February 10, 1999	Socorro	LINEAR	·	1.2 km	MPC · JPL
121050	1999 CX_{49}	—	February 10, 1999	Socorro	LINEAR	·	2.1 km	MPC · JPL
121051	1999 CG_{50}	—	February 10, 1999	Socorro	LINEAR	·	1.9 km	MPC · JPL
121052	1999 CP_{51}	—	February 10, 1999	Socorro	LINEAR	NYS	2.0 km	MPC · JPL
121053	1999 CA_{54}	—	February 10, 1999	Socorro	LINEAR	NYS	1.7 km	MPC · JPL
121054	1999 CX_{73}	—	February 12, 1999	Socorro	LINEAR	·	1.4 km	MPC · JPL
121055	1999 CZ_{75}	—	February 12, 1999	Socorro	LINEAR	·	2.7 km	MPC · JPL
121056	1999 CA_{80}	—	February 12, 1999	Socorro	LINEAR	·	2.6 km	MPC · JPL
121057	1999 CA_{89}	—	February 10, 1999	Socorro	LINEAR	·	1.1 km	MPC · JPL
121058	1999 CD_{92}	—	February 10, 1999	Socorro	LINEAR	·	1.8 km	MPC · JPL
121059	1999 CO_{93}	—	February 10, 1999	Socorro	LINEAR	·	1.7 km	MPC · JPL
121060	1999 CH_{111}	—	February 12, 1999	Socorro	LINEAR	·	1.4 km	MPC · JPL
121061	1999 CY_{112}	—	February 12, 1999	Socorro	LINEAR	NYS	1.3 km	MPC · JPL
121062	1999 CF_{116}	—	February 12, 1999	Socorro	LINEAR	·	2.0 km	MPC · JPL
121063	1999 CO_{121}	—	February 11, 1999	Socorro	LINEAR	PHO	4.4 km	MPC · JPL
121064	1999 CW_{132}	—	February 9, 1999	Kitt Peak	Spacewatch	·	1.2 km	MPC · JPL
121065	1999 CX_{132}	—	February 9, 1999	Kitt Peak	Spacewatch	·	2.3 km	MPC · JPL
121066	1999 CW_{135}	—	February 8, 1999	Kitt Peak	Spacewatch	·	3.6 km	MPC · JPL
121067	1999 CN_{145}	—	February 8, 1999	Kitt Peak	Spacewatch	MAS	960 m	MPC · JPL
121068	1999 CT_{147}	—	February 10, 1999	Kitt Peak	Spacewatch	THM	4.4 km	MPC · JPL
121069	1999 CK_{149}	—	February 13, 1999	Kitt Peak	Spacewatch	·	1.5 km	MPC · JPL
121070	1999 CS_{149}	—	February 13, 1999	Kitt Peak	Spacewatch	·	3.6 km	MPC · JPL
121071	1999 CT_{149}	—	February 13, 1999	Kitt Peak	Spacewatch	·	2.5 km	MPC · JPL
121072	1999 DP_{3}	—	February 17, 1999	Farpoint	G. Hug, G. Bell	NYS ·	3.2 km	MPC · JPL
121073	1999 EL_{12}	—	March 15, 1999	Socorro	LINEAR	·	2.2 km	MPC · JPL
121074	1999 FA_{2}	—	March 16, 1999	Kitt Peak	Spacewatch	3:2	8.8 km	MPC · JPL
121075	1999 FA_{3}	—	March 17, 1999	Kitt Peak	Spacewatch	NYS	2.0 km	MPC · JPL
121076	1999 FB_{3}	—	March 17, 1999	Kitt Peak	Spacewatch	MAS	1.6 km	MPC · JPL
121077	1999 FG_{3}	—	March 17, 1999	Kitt Peak	Spacewatch	·	1.5 km	MPC · JPL
121078	1999 FP_{3}	—	March 19, 1999	Socorro	LINEAR	PHO	1.8 km	MPC · JPL
121079	1999 FP_{4}	—	March 17, 1999	Kitt Peak	Spacewatch	fast	1.8 km	MPC · JPL
121080	1999 FO_{6}	—	March 17, 1999	Caussols	ODAS	ERI	2.9 km	MPC · JPL
121081	1999 FN_{7}	—	March 20, 1999	Socorro	LINEAR	PHO	2.6 km	MPC · JPL
121082	1999 FP_{13}	—	March 19, 1999	Kitt Peak	Spacewatch	NYS	1.6 km	MPC · JPL
121083	1999 FV_{16}	—	March 23, 1999	Kitt Peak	Spacewatch	MAS	960 m	MPC · JPL
121084	1999 FY_{16}	—	March 23, 1999	Kitt Peak	Spacewatch	·	2.4 km	MPC · JPL
121085	1999 FA_{18}	—	March 23, 1999	Kitt Peak	Spacewatch	·	1.6 km	MPC · JPL
121086	1999 FB_{18}	—	March 23, 1999	Kitt Peak	Spacewatch	·	2.4 km	MPC · JPL
121087	1999 FO_{18}	—	March 22, 1999	Anderson Mesa	LONEOS	·	1.9 km	MPC · JPL
121088	1999 FX_{20}	—	March 24, 1999	Kleť	Kleť	NYS	1.4 km	MPC · JPL
121089 Vyšší Brod	1999 FH_{21}	Vyšší Brod	March 24, 1999	Kleť	M. Tichý	·	2.0 km	MPC · JPL
121090	1999 FM_{27}	—	March 19, 1999	Socorro	LINEAR	NYS	2.4 km	MPC · JPL
121091	1999 FG_{34}	—	March 19, 1999	Socorro	LINEAR	NYS	1.9 km	MPC · JPL
121092	1999 FG_{40}	—	March 20, 1999	Socorro	LINEAR	·	2.6 km	MPC · JPL
121093	1999 FO_{46}	—	March 20, 1999	Socorro	LINEAR	NYS	1.6 km	MPC · JPL
121094	1999 FY_{48}	—	March 20, 1999	Socorro	LINEAR	·	3.1 km	MPC · JPL
121095	1999 FM_{49}	—	March 20, 1999	Socorro	LINEAR	NYS ·	3.3 km	MPC · JPL
121096	1999 FG_{51}	—	March 20, 1999	Socorro	LINEAR	ERI	4.0 km	MPC · JPL
121097	1999 FM_{54}	—	March 20, 1999	Socorro	LINEAR	·	2.1 km	MPC · JPL
121098	1999 FL_{55}	—	March 20, 1999	Socorro	LINEAR	·	2.4 km	MPC · JPL
121099	1999 FV_{55}	—	March 20, 1999	Socorro	LINEAR	·	3.4 km	MPC · JPL
121100	1999 FS_{62}	—	March 22, 1999	Anderson Mesa	LONEOS	·	2.3 km	MPC · JPL

== 121101–121200 ==
back to top

Designation			Discovery			Properties		Ref
Permanent	Provisional	Named after	Date	Site	Discoverer(s)	Category	Diam.	Ref
121101	1999 FA_{63}	—	March 22, 1999	Anderson Mesa	LONEOS	·	2.9 km	MPC · JPL
121102	1999 FE_{63}	—	March 20, 1999	Anderson Mesa	LONEOS	·	1.6 km	MPC · JPL
121103 Ericneilsen	1999 FX_{73}	Ericneilsen	March 20, 1999	Apache Point	SDSS	·	3.5 km	MPC · JPL
121104	1999 GQ	—	April 5, 1999	Višnjan Observatory	K. Korlević	·	2.9 km	MPC · JPL
121105	1999 GL_{1}	—	April 7, 1999	Oizumi	T. Kobayashi	·	4.5 km	MPC · JPL
121106	1999 GW_{1}	—	April 6, 1999	Kitt Peak	Spacewatch	NYS	2.1 km	MPC · JPL
121107	1999 GF_{5}	—	April 3, 1999	Xinglong	SCAP	PHO	5.2 km	MPC · JPL
121108	1999 GA_{7}	—	April 15, 1999	Socorro	LINEAR	PHO	5.2 km	MPC · JPL
121109	1999 GV_{7}	—	April 9, 1999	Anderson Mesa	LONEOS	·	1.5 km	MPC · JPL
121110	1999 GO_{12}	—	April 12, 1999	Kitt Peak	Spacewatch	·	2.2 km	MPC · JPL
121111	1999 GD_{16}	—	April 9, 1999	Socorro	LINEAR	·	1.6 km	MPC · JPL
121112	1999 GG_{25}	—	April 6, 1999	Socorro	LINEAR	NYS	1.6 km	MPC · JPL
121113	1999 GM_{25}	—	April 6, 1999	Socorro	LINEAR	EUN	2.5 km	MPC · JPL
121114	1999 GD_{28}	—	April 7, 1999	Socorro	LINEAR	·	2.5 km	MPC · JPL
121115	1999 GO_{31}	—	April 7, 1999	Socorro	LINEAR	·	1.9 km	MPC · JPL
121116	1999 GH_{42}	—	April 12, 1999	Socorro	LINEAR	·	1.6 km	MPC · JPL
121117	1999 GE_{56}	—	April 9, 1999	Kitt Peak	Spacewatch	SUL	3.7 km	MPC · JPL
121118	1999 GK_{58}	—	April 7, 1999	Socorro	LINEAR	·	1.7 km	MPC · JPL
121119	1999 GZ_{58}	—	April 12, 1999	Socorro	LINEAR	·	1.9 km	MPC · JPL
121120	1999 GQ_{59}	—	April 12, 1999	Socorro	LINEAR	·	3.4 km	MPC · JPL
121121 Koyoharugotoge	1999 HJ_{3}	Koyoharugotoge	April 19, 1999	Goodricke-Pigott	R. A. Tucker	H	870 m	MPC · JPL
121122	1999 HW_{3}	—	April 21, 1999	Woomera	F. B. Zoltowski	·	1.9 km	MPC · JPL
121123	1999 HK_{4}	—	April 16, 1999	Kitt Peak	Spacewatch	AST	2.9 km	MPC · JPL
121124	1999 HZ_{8}	—	April 17, 1999	Socorro	LINEAR	NYS	2.2 km	MPC · JPL
121125	1999 HW_{9}	—	April 17, 1999	Socorro	LINEAR	NYS	2.4 km	MPC · JPL
121126	1999 JO_{2}	—	May 8, 1999	Catalina	CSS	·	1.6 km	MPC · JPL
121127	1999 JF_{3}	—	May 8, 1999	Reedy Creek	J. Broughton	NYS	1.7 km	MPC · JPL
121128	1999 JO_{3}	—	May 6, 1999	Socorro	LINEAR	slow	3.4 km	MPC · JPL
121129	1999 JV_{4}	—	May 10, 1999	Socorro	LINEAR	PHO	2.5 km	MPC · JPL
121130	1999 JB_{5}	—	May 10, 1999	Socorro	LINEAR	V	1.4 km	MPC · JPL
121131	1999 JE_{9}	—	May 7, 1999	Catalina	CSS	PHO	3.1 km	MPC · JPL
121132 Garydavis	1999 JB_{10}	Garydavis	May 8, 1999	Catalina	CSS	·	2.4 km	MPC · JPL
121133 Kenflurchick	1999 JN_{14}	Kenflurchick	May 15, 1999	Goodricke-Pigott	R. A. Tucker	·	2.8 km	MPC · JPL
121134	1999 JT_{16}	—	May 15, 1999	Kitt Peak	Spacewatch	·	2.1 km	MPC · JPL
121135	1999 JJ_{26}	—	May 10, 1999	Socorro	LINEAR	·	2.5 km	MPC · JPL
121136	1999 JJ_{27}	—	May 10, 1999	Socorro	LINEAR	·	2.3 km	MPC · JPL
121137	1999 JV_{32}	—	May 10, 1999	Socorro	LINEAR	NYS	2.1 km	MPC · JPL
121138	1999 JB_{33}	—	May 10, 1999	Socorro	LINEAR	NYS	1.3 km	MPC · JPL
121139	1999 JF_{34}	—	May 10, 1999	Socorro	LINEAR	·	3.4 km	MPC · JPL
121140	1999 JZ_{39}	—	May 10, 1999	Socorro	LINEAR	NYS	2.3 km	MPC · JPL
121141	1999 JE_{40}	—	May 10, 1999	Socorro	LINEAR	·	2.6 km	MPC · JPL
121142	1999 JQ_{40}	—	May 10, 1999	Socorro	LINEAR	MAS	1.5 km	MPC · JPL
121143	1999 JX_{44}	—	May 10, 1999	Socorro	LINEAR	V	1.2 km	MPC · JPL
121144	1999 JP_{45}	—	May 10, 1999	Socorro	LINEAR	NYS	1.8 km	MPC · JPL
121145	1999 JT_{59}	—	May 10, 1999	Socorro	LINEAR	·	2.5 km	MPC · JPL
121146	1999 JT_{67}	—	May 12, 1999	Socorro	LINEAR	·	3.3 km	MPC · JPL
121147	1999 JK_{69}	—	May 12, 1999	Socorro	LINEAR	·	3.2 km	MPC · JPL
121148	1999 JC_{71}	—	May 12, 1999	Socorro	LINEAR	·	1.8 km	MPC · JPL
121149	1999 JQ_{72}	—	May 12, 1999	Socorro	LINEAR	NYS	1.5 km	MPC · JPL
121150	1999 JV_{72}	—	May 12, 1999	Socorro	LINEAR	·	2.6 km	MPC · JPL
121151	1999 JH_{74}	—	May 12, 1999	Socorro	LINEAR	·	2.7 km	MPC · JPL
121152	1999 JU_{82}	—	May 12, 1999	Socorro	LINEAR	·	2.9 km	MPC · JPL
121153	1999 JQ_{88}	—	May 14, 1999	Socorro	LINEAR	·	1.6 km	MPC · JPL
121154	1999 JU_{90}	—	May 12, 1999	Socorro	LINEAR	·	2.5 km	MPC · JPL
121155	1999 JH_{95}	—	May 12, 1999	Socorro	LINEAR	EUN	2.3 km	MPC · JPL
121156	1999 JJ_{96}	—	May 12, 1999	Socorro	LINEAR	·	3.0 km	MPC · JPL
121157	1999 JT_{97}	—	May 12, 1999	Socorro	LINEAR	·	2.5 km	MPC · JPL
121158	1999 JH_{98}	—	May 12, 1999	Socorro	LINEAR	·	4.1 km	MPC · JPL
121159	1999 JJ_{100}	—	May 12, 1999	Socorro	LINEAR	·	5.8 km	MPC · JPL
121160	1999 JL_{102}	—	May 13, 1999	Socorro	LINEAR	·	2.0 km	MPC · JPL
121161	1999 JG_{111}	—	May 13, 1999	Socorro	LINEAR	·	1.4 km	MPC · JPL
121162	1999 JY_{113}	—	May 13, 1999	Socorro	LINEAR	DOR	6.5 km	MPC · JPL
121163	1999 JM_{118}	—	May 13, 1999	Socorro	LINEAR	MAS	1.8 km	MPC · JPL
121164	1999 JO_{118}	—	May 13, 1999	Socorro	LINEAR	·	2.4 km	MPC · JPL
121165	1999 JU_{120}	—	May 13, 1999	Socorro	LINEAR	NYS	2.6 km	MPC · JPL
121166	1999 JC_{125}	—	May 10, 1999	Socorro	LINEAR	NYS	2.7 km	MPC · JPL
121167	1999 JE_{135}	—	May 12, 1999	Socorro	LINEAR	PHO	2.1 km	MPC · JPL
121168	1999 KS_{1}	—	May 16, 1999	Kitt Peak	Spacewatch	MAS	1.4 km	MPC · JPL
121169	1999 KA_{2}	—	May 16, 1999	Kitt Peak	Spacewatch	·	1.9 km	MPC · JPL
121170	1999 KG_{7}	—	May 17, 1999	Socorro	LINEAR	·	2.5 km	MPC · JPL
121171	1999 KE_{9}	—	May 18, 1999	Socorro	LINEAR	NYS	1.5 km	MPC · JPL
121172	1999 KZ_{11}	—	May 18, 1999	Socorro	LINEAR	·	2.4 km	MPC · JPL
121173	1999 KE_{13}	—	May 18, 1999	Socorro	LINEAR	·	3.5 km	MPC · JPL
121174	1999 KK_{14}	—	May 18, 1999	Socorro	LINEAR	·	1.9 km	MPC · JPL
121175	1999 KU_{15}	—	May 18, 1999	Socorro	LINEAR	·	2.4 km	MPC · JPL
121176	1999 LH_{5}	—	June 11, 1999	Socorro	LINEAR	PHO	1.7 km	MPC · JPL
121177	1999 LV_{6}	—	June 7, 1999	Kitt Peak	Spacewatch	·	6.5 km	MPC · JPL
121178	1999 LS_{8}	—	June 8, 1999	Socorro	LINEAR	·	1.7 km	MPC · JPL
121179	1999 LX_{14}	—	June 10, 1999	Socorro	LINEAR	·	1.8 km	MPC · JPL
121180	1999 LX_{15}	—	June 12, 1999	Socorro	LINEAR	H ·	1.2 km	MPC · JPL
121181	1999 LC_{25}	—	June 9, 1999	Socorro	LINEAR	·	1.6 km	MPC · JPL
121182	1999 LQ_{31}	—	June 11, 1999	Kitt Peak	Spacewatch	·	1.7 km	MPC · JPL
121183	1999 LT_{36}	—	June 7, 1999	Anderson Mesa	LONEOS	·	3.1 km	MPC · JPL
121184	1999 NH	—	July 5, 1999	Farpoint	G. Bell, G. Hug	H	1.2 km	MPC · JPL
121185	1999 NP	—	July 7, 1999	Reedy Creek	J. Broughton	NYS	1.9 km	MPC · JPL
121186	1999 NR_{1}	—	July 12, 1999	Socorro	LINEAR	H	1.3 km	MPC · JPL
121187	1999 NJ_{13}	—	July 14, 1999	Socorro	LINEAR	·	2.5 km	MPC · JPL
121188	1999 NR_{17}	—	July 14, 1999	Socorro	LINEAR	·	4.4 km	MPC · JPL
121189	1999 NE_{19}	—	July 14, 1999	Socorro	LINEAR	·	2.1 km	MPC · JPL
121190	1999 NP_{19}	—	July 14, 1999	Socorro	LINEAR	H	1.1 km	MPC · JPL
121191	1999 NT_{19}	—	July 14, 1999	Socorro	LINEAR	·	2.1 km	MPC · JPL
121192	1999 NC_{22}	—	July 14, 1999	Socorro	LINEAR	·	2.8 km	MPC · JPL
121193	1999 NK_{22}	—	July 14, 1999	Socorro	LINEAR	·	2.8 km	MPC · JPL
121194	1999 NQ_{26}	—	July 14, 1999	Socorro	LINEAR	·	3.1 km	MPC · JPL
121195	1999 NY_{29}	—	July 14, 1999	Socorro	LINEAR	·	3.7 km	MPC · JPL
121196	1999 NY_{31}	—	July 14, 1999	Socorro	LINEAR	·	2.3 km	MPC · JPL
121197	1999 NB_{33}	—	July 14, 1999	Socorro	LINEAR	H	1.2 km	MPC · JPL
121198	1999 NB_{35}	—	July 14, 1999	Socorro	LINEAR	·	4.6 km	MPC · JPL
121199	1999 NC_{38}	—	July 14, 1999	Socorro	LINEAR	·	2.8 km	MPC · JPL
121200	1999 NK_{38}	—	July 14, 1999	Socorro	LINEAR	·	6.9 km	MPC · JPL

== 121201–121300 ==
back to top

Designation			Discovery			Properties		Ref
Permanent	Provisional	Named after	Date	Site	Discoverer(s)	Category	Diam.	Ref
121201	1999 NR_{41}	—	July 14, 1999	Socorro	LINEAR	H	1.1 km	MPC · JPL
121202	1999 NG_{46}	—	July 13, 1999	Socorro	LINEAR	·	3.0 km	MPC · JPL
121203	1999 NB_{49}	—	July 13, 1999	Socorro	LINEAR	·	2.9 km	MPC · JPL
121204	1999 OK_{2}	—	July 22, 1999	Socorro	LINEAR	H	1.3 km	MPC · JPL
121205	1999 PG_{1}	—	August 8, 1999	Prescott	P. G. Comba	·	4.1 km	MPC · JPL
121206	1999 PO_{3}	—	August 13, 1999	Baton Rouge	W. R. Cooney Jr.	·	3.8 km	MPC · JPL
121207	1999 PX_{3}	—	August 7, 1999	Anderson Mesa	LONEOS	H	990 m	MPC · JPL
121208	1999 PZ_{4}	—	August 8, 1999	Gekko	T. Kagawa	·	2.4 km	MPC · JPL
121209	1999 QJ_{1}	—	August 17, 1999	Kitt Peak	Spacewatch	EOS	3.7 km	MPC · JPL
121210	1999 QG_{2}	—	August 25, 1999	Ondřejov	L. Kotková	·	2.8 km	MPC · JPL
121211 Nikeshadavis	1999 RB_{4}	Nikeshadavis	September 4, 1999	Catalina	CSS	·	2.2 km	MPC · JPL
121212	1999 RP_{5}	—	September 3, 1999	Kitt Peak	Spacewatch	KOR	1.8 km	MPC · JPL
121213	1999 RR_{6}	—	September 3, 1999	Kitt Peak	Spacewatch	·	3.4 km	MPC · JPL
121214	1999 RU_{7}	—	September 3, 1999	Kitt Peak	Spacewatch	·	2.8 km	MPC · JPL
121215	1999 RA_{8}	—	September 3, 1999	Kitt Peak	Spacewatch	·	3.0 km	MPC · JPL
121216	1999 RP_{9}	—	September 4, 1999	Kitt Peak	Spacewatch	·	3.5 km	MPC · JPL
121217	1999 RV_{10}	—	September 7, 1999	Socorro	LINEAR	·	6.4 km	MPC · JPL
121218	1999 RJ_{11}	—	September 7, 1999	Socorro	LINEAR	H	1.3 km	MPC · JPL
121219	1999 RL_{11}	—	September 7, 1999	Socorro	LINEAR	ADE	4.8 km	MPC · JPL
121220	1999 RK_{13}	—	September 7, 1999	Socorro	LINEAR	(5)	2.5 km	MPC · JPL
121221	1999 RO_{13}	—	September 7, 1999	Socorro	LINEAR	·	3.2 km	MPC · JPL
121222	1999 RG_{14}	—	September 7, 1999	Socorro	LINEAR	H	1.0 km	MPC · JPL
121223	1999 RQ_{15}	—	September 7, 1999	Socorro	LINEAR	H	870 m	MPC · JPL
121224	1999 RA_{21}	—	September 7, 1999	Socorro	LINEAR	H	980 m	MPC · JPL
121225	1999 RX_{27}	—	September 8, 1999	Kleť	Kleť	·	8.1 km	MPC · JPL
121226	1999 RZ_{28}	—	September 7, 1999	Socorro	LINEAR	H	940 m	MPC · JPL
121227	1999 RA_{29}	—	September 7, 1999	Socorro	LINEAR	H	1.4 km	MPC · JPL
121228	1999 RQ_{29}	—	September 8, 1999	Socorro	LINEAR	H	1.5 km	MPC · JPL
121229	1999 RC_{30}	—	September 8, 1999	Socorro	LINEAR	·	5.6 km	MPC · JPL
121230	1999 RH_{30}	—	September 8, 1999	Socorro	LINEAR	H	1.1 km	MPC · JPL
121231	1999 RD_{31}	—	September 8, 1999	Socorro	LINEAR	H	1.5 km	MPC · JPL
121232 Zerin	1999 RK_{35}	Zerin	September 11, 1999	Starkenburg Observatory	Starkenburg	·	3.1 km	MPC · JPL
121233	1999 RU_{36}	—	September 10, 1999	Woomera	F. B. Zoltowski	·	5.0 km	MPC · JPL
121234	1999 RM_{37}	—	September 11, 1999	Socorro	LINEAR	·	6.3 km	MPC · JPL
121235	1999 RB_{39}	—	September 13, 1999	Kanab	Sheridan, E. E.	(5)	2.2 km	MPC · JPL
121236 Adrianagutierrez	1999 RJ_{39}	Adrianagutierrez	September 8, 1999	Catalina	CSS	H	1.3 km	MPC · JPL
121237 Zachdolch	1999 RK_{39}	Zachdolch	September 8, 1999	Catalina	CSS	·	5.0 km	MPC · JPL
121238	1999 RM_{40}	—	September 7, 1999	Socorro	LINEAR	H	810 m	MPC · JPL
121239	1999 RQ_{41}	—	September 14, 1999	Kleť	Kleť	KOR	2.6 km	MPC · JPL
121240	1999 RG_{44}	—	September 15, 1999	Reedy Creek	J. Broughton	·	3.9 km	MPC · JPL
121241	1999 RW_{46}	—	September 7, 1999	Socorro	LINEAR	·	3.2 km	MPC · JPL
121242	1999 RR_{48}	—	September 7, 1999	Socorro	LINEAR	·	3.1 km	MPC · JPL
121243	1999 RQ_{50}	—	September 7, 1999	Socorro	LINEAR	·	2.4 km	MPC · JPL
121244	1999 RE_{51}	—	September 7, 1999	Socorro	LINEAR	·	1.9 km	MPC · JPL
121245	1999 RO_{51}	—	September 7, 1999	Socorro	LINEAR	fast	2.8 km	MPC · JPL
121246	1999 RU_{55}	—	September 7, 1999	Socorro	LINEAR	PHO	2.6 km	MPC · JPL
121247	1999 RX_{58}	—	September 7, 1999	Socorro	LINEAR	·	3.8 km	MPC · JPL
121248	1999 RR_{63}	—	September 7, 1999	Socorro	LINEAR	GEF	1.8 km	MPC · JPL
121249	1999 RC_{65}	—	September 7, 1999	Socorro	LINEAR	·	3.3 km	MPC · JPL
121250	1999 RF_{66}	—	September 7, 1999	Socorro	LINEAR	DOR	4.4 km	MPC · JPL
121251	1999 RO_{71}	—	September 7, 1999	Socorro	LINEAR	·	4.4 km	MPC · JPL
121252	1999 RS_{71}	—	September 7, 1999	Socorro	LINEAR	·	5.2 km	MPC · JPL
121253	1999 RW_{71}	—	September 7, 1999	Socorro	LINEAR	·	7.1 km	MPC · JPL
121254	1999 RK_{76}	—	September 7, 1999	Socorro	LINEAR	·	2.0 km	MPC · JPL
121255	1999 RM_{83}	—	September 7, 1999	Socorro	LINEAR	·	7.9 km	MPC · JPL
121256	1999 RL_{85}	—	September 7, 1999	Socorro	LINEAR	·	2.3 km	MPC · JPL
121257	1999 RQ_{91}	—	September 7, 1999	Socorro	LINEAR	·	2.8 km	MPC · JPL
121258	1999 RL_{94}	—	September 7, 1999	Socorro	LINEAR	EOS	4.2 km	MPC · JPL
121259	1999 RC_{95}	—	September 7, 1999	Socorro	LINEAR	·	3.7 km	MPC · JPL
121260	1999 RR_{96}	—	September 7, 1999	Socorro	LINEAR	·	2.0 km	MPC · JPL
121261	1999 RY_{97}	—	September 7, 1999	Socorro	LINEAR	AGN	2.4 km	MPC · JPL
121262	1999 RE_{98}	—	September 7, 1999	Socorro	LINEAR	EOS	3.6 km	MPC · JPL
121263	1999 RO_{98}	—	September 7, 1999	Socorro	LINEAR	·	4.1 km	MPC · JPL
121264	1999 RP_{105}	—	September 8, 1999	Socorro	LINEAR	·	2.7 km	MPC · JPL
121265	1999 RT_{106}	—	September 8, 1999	Socorro	LINEAR	·	4.8 km	MPC · JPL
121266	1999 RU_{106}	—	September 8, 1999	Socorro	LINEAR	·	3.7 km	MPC · JPL
121267	1999 RX_{106}	—	September 8, 1999	Socorro	LINEAR	·	4.2 km	MPC · JPL
121268	1999 RD_{108}	—	September 8, 1999	Socorro	LINEAR	·	2.7 km	MPC · JPL
121269	1999 RK_{108}	—	September 8, 1999	Socorro	LINEAR	GEF	3.0 km	MPC · JPL
121270	1999 RT_{113}	—	September 9, 1999	Socorro	LINEAR	PAD	3.7 km	MPC · JPL
121271	1999 RD_{114}	—	September 9, 1999	Socorro	LINEAR	·	5.4 km	MPC · JPL
121272	1999 RB_{115}	—	September 9, 1999	Socorro	LINEAR	·	3.6 km	MPC · JPL
121273	1999 RN_{118}	—	September 9, 1999	Socorro	LINEAR	·	2.1 km	MPC · JPL
121274	1999 RM_{124}	—	September 9, 1999	Socorro	LINEAR	MAR	2.3 km	MPC · JPL
121275	1999 RC_{126}	—	September 9, 1999	Socorro	LINEAR	·	6.8 km	MPC · JPL
121276	1999 RJ_{136}	—	September 9, 1999	Socorro	LINEAR	·	3.9 km	MPC · JPL
121277	1999 RX_{136}	—	September 9, 1999	Socorro	LINEAR	MAR	3.3 km	MPC · JPL
121278	1999 RH_{142}	—	September 9, 1999	Socorro	LINEAR	·	4.1 km	MPC · JPL
121279	1999 RQ_{143}	—	September 9, 1999	Socorro	LINEAR	·	3.1 km	MPC · JPL
121280	1999 RY_{143}	—	September 9, 1999	Socorro	LINEAR	AGN	2.1 km	MPC · JPL
121281	1999 RW_{148}	—	September 9, 1999	Socorro	LINEAR	·	4.6 km	MPC · JPL
121282	1999 RC_{153}	—	September 9, 1999	Socorro	LINEAR	·	3.5 km	MPC · JPL
121283	1999 RE_{153}	—	September 9, 1999	Socorro	LINEAR	·	2.5 km	MPC · JPL
121284	1999 RQ_{157}	—	September 9, 1999	Socorro	LINEAR	·	3.9 km	MPC · JPL
121285	1999 RB_{161}	—	September 9, 1999	Socorro	LINEAR	·	4.9 km	MPC · JPL
121286	1999 RG_{161}	—	September 9, 1999	Socorro	LINEAR	·	2.5 km	MPC · JPL
121287	1999 RU_{164}	—	September 9, 1999	Socorro	LINEAR	·	5.2 km	MPC · JPL
121288	1999 RT_{171}	—	September 9, 1999	Socorro	LINEAR	EUN	1.9 km	MPC · JPL
121289	1999 RS_{174}	—	September 9, 1999	Socorro	LINEAR	·	5.0 km	MPC · JPL
121290	1999 RK_{176}	—	September 9, 1999	Socorro	LINEAR	·	3.6 km	MPC · JPL
121291	1999 RN_{176}	—	September 9, 1999	Socorro	LINEAR	·	4.3 km	MPC · JPL
121292	1999 RR_{180}	—	September 9, 1999	Socorro	LINEAR	(5)	2.2 km	MPC · JPL
121293	1999 RL_{182}	—	September 9, 1999	Socorro	LINEAR	slow	4.2 km	MPC · JPL
121294	1999 RW_{182}	—	September 9, 1999	Socorro	LINEAR	·	2.2 km	MPC · JPL
121295	1999 RW_{185}	—	September 9, 1999	Socorro	LINEAR	·	1.8 km	MPC · JPL
121296	1999 RH_{193}	—	September 13, 1999	Socorro	LINEAR	·	3.8 km	MPC · JPL
121297	1999 RU_{195}	—	September 8, 1999	Socorro	LINEAR	·	6.3 km	MPC · JPL
121298	1999 RK_{198}	—	September 9, 1999	Socorro	LINEAR	·	3.6 km	MPC · JPL
121299	1999 RL_{202}	—	September 8, 1999	Socorro	LINEAR	·	4.2 km	MPC · JPL
121300	1999 RM_{202}	—	September 8, 1999	Socorro	LINEAR	·	5.1 km	MPC · JPL

== 121301–121400 ==
back to top

Designation			Discovery			Properties		Ref
Permanent	Provisional	Named after	Date	Site	Discoverer(s)	Category	Diam.	Ref
121301	1999 RT_{202}	—	September 8, 1999	Socorro	LINEAR	·	5.0 km	MPC · JPL
121302	1999 RN_{203}	—	September 8, 1999	Socorro	LINEAR	·	7.4 km	MPC · JPL
121303	1999 RB_{205}	—	September 8, 1999	Socorro	LINEAR	EUN	2.7 km	MPC · JPL
121304	1999 RA_{206}	—	September 8, 1999	Socorro	LINEAR	·	6.0 km	MPC · JPL
121305	1999 RH_{206}	—	September 8, 1999	Socorro	LINEAR	·	4.9 km	MPC · JPL
121306	1999 RQ_{207}	—	September 8, 1999	Socorro	LINEAR	DOR	5.6 km	MPC · JPL
121307	1999 RT_{207}	—	September 8, 1999	Socorro	LINEAR	·	4.2 km	MPC · JPL
121308	1999 RD_{208}	—	September 8, 1999	Socorro	LINEAR	·	7.1 km	MPC · JPL
121309	1999 RG_{209}	—	September 8, 1999	Socorro	LINEAR	·	4.5 km	MPC · JPL
121310	1999 RJ_{209}	—	September 8, 1999	Socorro	LINEAR	·	4.3 km	MPC · JPL
121311	1999 RR_{209}	—	September 8, 1999	Socorro	LINEAR	EOS	3.1 km	MPC · JPL
121312	1999 RS_{209}	—	September 8, 1999	Socorro	LINEAR	EOS	3.7 km	MPC · JPL
121313 Tamsin	1999 RF_{214}	Tamsin	September 8, 1999	Uccle	T. Pauwels	·	2.1 km	MPC · JPL
121314	1999 RW_{217}	—	September 4, 1999	Anderson Mesa	LONEOS	(5)	2.8 km	MPC · JPL
121315 Mikelentz	1999 RB_{218}	Mikelentz	September 4, 1999	Catalina	CSS	·	3.2 km	MPC · JPL
121316	1999 RC_{219}	—	September 5, 1999	Anderson Mesa	LONEOS	·	4.0 km	MPC · JPL
121317	1999 RE_{225}	—	September 7, 1999	Socorro	LINEAR	·	3.7 km	MPC · JPL
121318	1999 RY_{242}	—	September 4, 1999	Anderson Mesa	LONEOS	·	3.9 km	MPC · JPL
121319	1999 RN_{247}	—	September 5, 1999	Kitt Peak	Spacewatch	·	3.0 km	MPC · JPL
121320	1999 RR_{249}	—	September 6, 1999	Kitt Peak	Spacewatch	·	5.0 km	MPC · JPL
121321	1999 SH	—	September 16, 1999	Višnjan Observatory	K. Korlević	·	4.4 km	MPC · JPL
121322	1999 SQ_{1}	—	September 19, 1999	Ondřejov	L. Kotková	·	2.2 km	MPC · JPL
121323	1999 SJ_{3}	—	September 22, 1999	Socorro	LINEAR	·	6.2 km	MPC · JPL
121324	1999 SQ_{5}	—	September 30, 1999	Socorro	LINEAR	H	1.2 km	MPC · JPL
121325	1999 SU_{5}	—	September 30, 1999	Socorro	LINEAR	H	1.2 km	MPC · JPL
121326	1999 SG_{12}	—	September 22, 1999	Socorro	LINEAR	·	6.7 km	MPC · JPL
121327 Andreweaker	1999 SL_{14}	Andreweaker	September 30, 1999	Catalina	CSS	·	3.5 km	MPC · JPL
121328 Devlynrfennell	1999 SZ_{14}	Devlynrfennell	September 29, 1999	Catalina	CSS	·	4.9 km	MPC · JPL
121329 Getzandanner	1999 SF_{15}	Getzandanner	September 30, 1999	Catalina	CSS	·	4.9 km	MPC · JPL
121330 Colbygoodloe	1999 SW_{16}	Colbygoodloe	September 29, 1999	Catalina	CSS	·	3.2 km	MPC · JPL
121331 Savannahsalazar	1999 SN_{22}	Savannahsalazar	September 30, 1999	Catalina	CSS	·	3.7 km	MPC · JPL
121332 Jasonhair	1999 SB_{24}	Jasonhair	September 29, 1999	Catalina	CSS	·	5.2 km	MPC · JPL
121333	1999 TF_{3}	—	October 4, 1999	Prescott	P. G. Comba	KOR	2.1 km	MPC · JPL
121334	1999 TQ_{3}	—	October 3, 1999	Stroncone	Santa Lucia	EOS	3.8 km	MPC · JPL
121335	1999 TO_{4}	—	October 2, 1999	Socorro	LINEAR	H	1.0 km	MPC · JPL
121336 Žiarnadhronom	1999 TF_{6}	Žiarnadhronom	October 6, 1999	Modra	Kornoš, L., Tóth	·	6.3 km	MPC · JPL
121337	1999 TW_{8}	—	October 1, 1999	Farra d'Isonzo	Farra d'Isonzo	·	3.0 km	MPC · JPL
121338	1999 TY_{8}	—	October 1, 1999	Farra d'Isonzo	Farra d'Isonzo	·	4.8 km	MPC · JPL
121339 Otabekburkhonov	1999 TO_{15}	Otabekburkhonov	October 13, 1999	Ondřejov	P. Kušnirák, P. Pravec	·	2.9 km	MPC · JPL
121340	1999 TO_{17}	—	October 15, 1999	Prescott	P. G. Comba	H	1.4 km	MPC · JPL
121341	1999 TB_{19}	—	October 15, 1999	Višnjan Observatory	K. Korlević	·	6.8 km	MPC · JPL
121342	1999 TV_{19}	—	October 10, 1999	Xinglong	SCAP	·	6.5 km	MPC · JPL
121343	1999 TH_{27}	—	October 3, 1999	Socorro	LINEAR	·	3.6 km	MPC · JPL
121344	1999 TB_{29}	—	October 4, 1999	Socorro	LINEAR	fast	3.3 km	MPC · JPL
121345	1999 TA_{32}	—	October 4, 1999	Socorro	LINEAR	·	3.4 km	MPC · JPL
121346	1999 TB_{33}	—	October 4, 1999	Socorro	LINEAR	·	5.3 km	MPC · JPL
121347	1999 TL_{33}	—	October 4, 1999	Socorro	LINEAR	·	4.7 km	MPC · JPL
121348	1999 TP_{33}	—	October 4, 1999	Socorro	LINEAR	TIR	3.8 km	MPC · JPL
121349	1999 TM_{34}	—	October 2, 1999	Socorro	LINEAR	H	1.3 km	MPC · JPL
121350	1999 TU_{34}	—	October 3, 1999	Socorro	LINEAR	H	1.2 km	MPC · JPL
121351	1999 TL_{35}	—	October 4, 1999	Socorro	LINEAR	H	1.6 km	MPC · JPL
121352 Taylorhale	1999 TG_{38}	Taylorhale	October 1, 1999	Catalina	CSS	·	3.4 km	MPC · JPL
121353	1999 TF_{39}	—	October 3, 1999	Catalina	CSS	·	7.2 km	MPC · JPL
121354	1999 TX_{47}	—	October 4, 1999	Kitt Peak	Spacewatch	HYG	3.6 km	MPC · JPL
121355	1999 TQ_{49}	—	October 4, 1999	Kitt Peak	Spacewatch	·	2.5 km	MPC · JPL
121356	1999 TE_{52}	—	October 4, 1999	Kitt Peak	Spacewatch	·	4.1 km	MPC · JPL
121357	1999 TA_{54}	—	October 6, 1999	Kitt Peak	Spacewatch	·	4.2 km	MPC · JPL
121358	1999 TR_{54}	—	October 6, 1999	Kitt Peak	Spacewatch	·	3.2 km	MPC · JPL
121359	1999 TG_{55}	—	October 6, 1999	Kitt Peak	Spacewatch	WIT	1.8 km	MPC · JPL
121360	1999 TP_{56}	—	October 6, 1999	Kitt Peak	Spacewatch	KOR	2.3 km	MPC · JPL
121361	1999 TJ_{60}	—	October 7, 1999	Kitt Peak	Spacewatch	KOR	2.4 km	MPC · JPL
121362	1999 TB_{61}	—	October 7, 1999	Kitt Peak	Spacewatch	·	4.4 km	MPC · JPL
121363	1999 TK_{61}	—	October 7, 1999	Kitt Peak	Spacewatch	AGN	1.9 km	MPC · JPL
121364	1999 TH_{62}	—	October 7, 1999	Kitt Peak	Spacewatch	TEL	2.3 km	MPC · JPL
121365	1999 TB_{65}	—	October 8, 1999	Kitt Peak	Spacewatch	·	3.4 km	MPC · JPL
121366	1999 TZ_{65}	—	October 8, 1999	Kitt Peak	Spacewatch	·	6.7 km	MPC · JPL
121367	1999 TK_{67}	—	October 8, 1999	Kitt Peak	Spacewatch	·	3.3 km	MPC · JPL
121368	1999 TP_{69}	—	October 9, 1999	Kitt Peak	Spacewatch	KOR	2.9 km	MPC · JPL
121369	1999 TJ_{70}	—	October 9, 1999	Kitt Peak	Spacewatch	THM	4.8 km	MPC · JPL
121370	1999 TK_{72}	—	October 9, 1999	Kitt Peak	Spacewatch	·	3.7 km	MPC · JPL
121371	1999 TE_{77}	—	October 10, 1999	Kitt Peak	Spacewatch	·	3.6 km	MPC · JPL
121372	1999 TD_{79}	—	October 11, 1999	Kitt Peak	Spacewatch	·	3.7 km	MPC · JPL
121373	1999 TB_{80}	—	October 11, 1999	Kitt Peak	Spacewatch	·	2.7 km	MPC · JPL
121374	1999 TG_{80}	—	October 11, 1999	Kitt Peak	Spacewatch	·	1.6 km	MPC · JPL
121375	1999 TK_{80}	—	October 11, 1999	Kitt Peak	Spacewatch	·	6.2 km	MPC · JPL
121376	1999 TX_{83}	—	October 13, 1999	Kitt Peak	Spacewatch	MAS	1.9 km	MPC · JPL
121377	1999 TF_{85}	—	October 14, 1999	Kitt Peak	Spacewatch	KOR	2.2 km	MPC · JPL
121378	1999 TO_{87}	—	October 15, 1999	Kitt Peak	Spacewatch	KOR	2.2 km	MPC · JPL
121379	1999 TV_{87}	—	October 15, 1999	Kitt Peak	Spacewatch	·	3.1 km	MPC · JPL
121380	1999 TJ_{89}	—	October 2, 1999	Socorro	LINEAR	·	4.1 km	MPC · JPL
121381	1999 TJ_{94}	—	October 2, 1999	Socorro	LINEAR	·	3.2 km	MPC · JPL
121382	1999 TU_{97}	—	October 2, 1999	Socorro	LINEAR	·	2.7 km	MPC · JPL
121383	1999 TJ_{100}	—	October 2, 1999	Socorro	LINEAR	HYG	4.4 km	MPC · JPL
121384	1999 TM_{104}	—	October 3, 1999	Socorro	LINEAR	·	6.3 km	MPC · JPL
121385	1999 TC_{114}	—	October 4, 1999	Socorro	LINEAR	·	3.2 km	MPC · JPL
121386	1999 TP_{114}	—	October 4, 1999	Socorro	LINEAR	·	3.0 km	MPC · JPL
121387	1999 TE_{117}	—	October 4, 1999	Socorro	LINEAR	·	5.9 km	MPC · JPL
121388	1999 TJ_{117}	—	October 4, 1999	Socorro	LINEAR	AGN	2.7 km	MPC · JPL
121389	1999 TY_{117}	—	October 4, 1999	Socorro	LINEAR	·	4.8 km	MPC · JPL
121390	1999 TA_{118}	—	October 4, 1999	Socorro	LINEAR	GEF	2.8 km	MPC · JPL
121391	1999 TP_{118}	—	October 4, 1999	Socorro	LINEAR	PAD	3.9 km	MPC · JPL
121392	1999 TU_{118}	—	October 4, 1999	Socorro	LINEAR	·	2.9 km	MPC · JPL
121393	1999 TA_{120}	—	October 4, 1999	Socorro	LINEAR	·	3.9 km	MPC · JPL
121394	1999 TM_{120}	—	October 4, 1999	Socorro	LINEAR	EUN	2.2 km	MPC · JPL
121395	1999 TQ_{122}	—	October 4, 1999	Socorro	LINEAR	·	2.2 km	MPC · JPL
121396	1999 TW_{123}	—	October 4, 1999	Socorro	LINEAR	·	5.9 km	MPC · JPL
121397	1999 TR_{125}	—	October 4, 1999	Socorro	LINEAR	·	4.1 km	MPC · JPL
121398	1999 TH_{129}	—	October 6, 1999	Socorro	LINEAR	·	2.1 km	MPC · JPL
121399	1999 TO_{129}	—	October 6, 1999	Socorro	LINEAR	·	3.2 km	MPC · JPL
121400	1999 TQ_{129}	—	October 6, 1999	Socorro	LINEAR	EUN	1.5 km	MPC · JPL

== 121401–121500 ==
back to top

Designation			Discovery			Properties		Ref
Permanent	Provisional	Named after	Date	Site	Discoverer(s)	Category	Diam.	Ref
121401	1999 TX_{129}	—	October 6, 1999	Socorro	LINEAR	·	4.2 km	MPC · JPL
121402	1999 TK_{131}	—	October 6, 1999	Socorro	LINEAR	·	2.4 km	MPC · JPL
121403	1999 TL_{131}	—	October 6, 1999	Socorro	LINEAR	·	3.2 km	MPC · JPL
121404	1999 TW_{132}	—	October 6, 1999	Socorro	LINEAR	·	2.5 km	MPC · JPL
121405	1999 TZ_{134}	—	October 6, 1999	Socorro	LINEAR	EOS	4.1 km	MPC · JPL
121406	1999 TR_{135}	—	October 6, 1999	Socorro	LINEAR	·	3.1 km	MPC · JPL
121407	1999 TB_{138}	—	October 6, 1999	Socorro	LINEAR	·	2.8 km	MPC · JPL
121408	1999 TD_{139}	—	October 6, 1999	Socorro	LINEAR	·	2.7 km	MPC · JPL
121409	1999 TB_{140}	—	October 6, 1999	Socorro	LINEAR	·	3.5 km	MPC · JPL
121410	1999 TH_{141}	—	October 15, 1999	Socorro	LINEAR	·	4.8 km	MPC · JPL
121411	1999 TR_{141}	—	October 6, 1999	Socorro	LINEAR	·	5.7 km	MPC · JPL
121412	1999 TW_{141}	—	October 7, 1999	Socorro	LINEAR	AGN	2.2 km	MPC · JPL
121413	1999 TW_{142}	—	October 7, 1999	Socorro	LINEAR	·	4.1 km	MPC · JPL
121414	1999 TA_{144}	—	October 7, 1999	Socorro	LINEAR	·	2.9 km	MPC · JPL
121415	1999 TR_{144}	—	October 7, 1999	Socorro	LINEAR	·	2.7 km	MPC · JPL
121416	1999 TG_{146}	—	October 7, 1999	Socorro	LINEAR	KOR	2.5 km	MPC · JPL
121417	1999 TL_{146}	—	October 7, 1999	Socorro	LINEAR	·	2.9 km	MPC · JPL
121418	1999 TO_{147}	—	October 7, 1999	Socorro	LINEAR	·	3.6 km	MPC · JPL
121419	1999 TW_{147}	—	October 7, 1999	Socorro	LINEAR	HYG	5.2 km	MPC · JPL
121420	1999 TD_{148}	—	October 7, 1999	Socorro	LINEAR	EOS	3.4 km	MPC · JPL
121421	1999 TR_{148}	—	October 7, 1999	Socorro	LINEAR	·	5.8 km	MPC · JPL
121422	1999 TD_{149}	—	October 7, 1999	Socorro	LINEAR	THM	4.3 km	MPC · JPL
121423	1999 TR_{149}	—	October 7, 1999	Socorro	LINEAR	·	2.8 km	MPC · JPL
121424	1999 TP_{151}	—	October 7, 1999	Socorro	LINEAR	·	4.4 km	MPC · JPL
121425	1999 TV_{152}	—	October 7, 1999	Socorro	LINEAR	LIX	5.7 km	MPC · JPL
121426	1999 TX_{153}	—	October 7, 1999	Socorro	LINEAR	·	2.8 km	MPC · JPL
121427	1999 TJ_{158}	—	October 7, 1999	Socorro	LINEAR	·	6.7 km	MPC · JPL
121428	1999 TY_{162}	—	October 9, 1999	Socorro	LINEAR	HOF	5.0 km	MPC · JPL
121429	1999 TL_{164}	—	October 10, 1999	Socorro	LINEAR	·	6.1 km	MPC · JPL
121430	1999 TZ_{165}	—	October 10, 1999	Socorro	LINEAR	·	4.3 km	MPC · JPL
121431	1999 TX_{168}	—	October 10, 1999	Socorro	LINEAR	·	3.2 km	MPC · JPL
121432	1999 TG_{171}	—	October 10, 1999	Socorro	LINEAR	·	1.2 km	MPC · JPL
121433	1999 TL_{175}	—	October 10, 1999	Socorro	LINEAR	·	3.6 km	MPC · JPL
121434	1999 TS_{178}	—	October 10, 1999	Socorro	LINEAR	·	5.0 km	MPC · JPL
121435	1999 TD_{180}	—	October 10, 1999	Socorro	LINEAR	·	4.8 km	MPC · JPL
121436	1999 TZ_{182}	—	October 11, 1999	Socorro	LINEAR	·	7.4 km	MPC · JPL
121437	1999 TT_{183}	—	October 12, 1999	Socorro	LINEAR	·	2.9 km	MPC · JPL
121438	1999 TA_{184}	—	October 12, 1999	Socorro	LINEAR	·	6.4 km	MPC · JPL
121439	1999 TK_{184}	—	October 12, 1999	Socorro	LINEAR	·	2.5 km	MPC · JPL
121440	1999 TY_{184}	—	October 12, 1999	Socorro	LINEAR	TIR	3.0 km	MPC · JPL
121441	1999 TA_{185}	—	October 12, 1999	Socorro	LINEAR	·	5.2 km	MPC · JPL
121442	1999 TE_{186}	—	October 12, 1999	Socorro	LINEAR	H	1.2 km	MPC · JPL
121443	1999 TP_{186}	—	October 12, 1999	Socorro	LINEAR	EOS	3.5 km	MPC · JPL
121444	1999 TN_{188}	—	October 12, 1999	Socorro	LINEAR	·	8.4 km	MPC · JPL
121445	1999 TH_{189}	—	October 12, 1999	Socorro	LINEAR	EOS	4.0 km	MPC · JPL
121446	1999 TR_{189}	—	October 12, 1999	Socorro	LINEAR	·	4.4 km	MPC · JPL
121447	1999 TO_{191}	—	October 12, 1999	Socorro	LINEAR	·	8.3 km	MPC · JPL
121448	1999 TR_{191}	—	October 12, 1999	Socorro	LINEAR	·	6.5 km	MPC · JPL
121449	1999 TU_{193}	—	October 12, 1999	Socorro	LINEAR	·	4.5 km	MPC · JPL
121450	1999 TO_{194}	—	October 12, 1999	Socorro	LINEAR	TEL	2.7 km	MPC · JPL
121451	1999 TP_{197}	—	October 12, 1999	Socorro	LINEAR	·	5.8 km	MPC · JPL
121452	1999 TW_{198}	—	October 12, 1999	Socorro	LINEAR	·	4.1 km	MPC · JPL
121453	1999 TE_{199}	—	October 12, 1999	Socorro	LINEAR	EOS	3.1 km	MPC · JPL
121454	1999 TA_{202}	—	October 13, 1999	Socorro	LINEAR	·	3.5 km	MPC · JPL
121455	1999 TM_{205}	—	October 13, 1999	Socorro	LINEAR	·	3.0 km	MPC · JPL
121456	1999 TQ_{206}	—	October 14, 1999	Socorro	LINEAR	·	3.6 km	MPC · JPL
121457	1999 TU_{206}	—	October 14, 1999	Socorro	LINEAR	H	1.1 km	MPC · JPL
121458	1999 TX_{206}	—	October 14, 1999	Socorro	LINEAR	H	860 m	MPC · JPL
121459	1999 TQ_{207}	—	October 14, 1999	Socorro	LINEAR	·	4.3 km	MPC · JPL
121460	1999 TW_{207}	—	October 14, 1999	Socorro	LINEAR	·	7.0 km	MPC · JPL
121461	1999 TX_{208}	—	October 14, 1999	Socorro	LINEAR	H	1.1 km	MPC · JPL
121462	1999 TB_{209}	—	October 14, 1999	Socorro	LINEAR	EOS	4.1 km	MPC · JPL
121463	1999 TE_{209}	—	October 14, 1999	Socorro	LINEAR	·	4.6 km	MPC · JPL
121464	1999 TO_{209}	—	October 14, 1999	Socorro	LINEAR	·	5.0 km	MPC · JPL
121465	1999 TJ_{214}	—	October 15, 1999	Socorro	LINEAR	PAD	4.1 km	MPC · JPL
121466	1999 TQ_{214}	—	October 15, 1999	Socorro	LINEAR	THM	4.6 km	MPC · JPL
121467	1999 TT_{217}	—	October 15, 1999	Socorro	LINEAR	·	5.9 km	MPC · JPL
121468 Msovinskihaskell	1999 TD_{219}	Msovinskihaskell	October 1, 1999	Catalina	CSS	·	5.9 km	MPC · JPL
121469 Sarahaugh	1999 TW_{221}	Sarahaugh	October 1, 1999	Catalina	CSS	KOR	2.8 km	MPC · JPL
121470	1999 TJ_{223}	—	October 2, 1999	Anderson Mesa	LONEOS	VER	7.0 km	MPC · JPL
121471	1999 TO_{225}	—	October 2, 1999	Kitt Peak	Spacewatch	·	2.7 km	MPC · JPL
121472	1999 TS_{225}	—	October 2, 1999	Kitt Peak	Spacewatch	·	2.0 km	MPC · JPL
121473	1999 TC_{226}	—	October 2, 1999	Kitt Peak	Spacewatch	·	3.5 km	MPC · JPL
121474	1999 TE_{228}	—	October 1, 1999	Kitt Peak	Spacewatch	·	3.6 km	MPC · JPL
121475	1999 TK_{228}	—	October 12, 1999	Socorro	LINEAR	·	3.7 km	MPC · JPL
121476	1999 TE_{232}	—	October 5, 1999	Catalina	CSS	·	4.8 km	MPC · JPL
121477	1999 TX_{232}	—	October 7, 1999	Socorro	LINEAR	·	2.5 km	MPC · JPL
121478	1999 TG_{233}	—	October 3, 1999	Socorro	LINEAR	·	4.8 km	MPC · JPL
121479 Hendershot	1999 TM_{236}	Hendershot	October 3, 1999	Catalina	CSS	·	5.2 km	MPC · JPL
121480 Dolanhighsmith	1999 TH_{240}	Dolanhighsmith	October 4, 1999	Catalina	CSS	AGN	3.0 km	MPC · JPL
121481 Reganhoward	1999 TY_{240}	Reganhoward	October 4, 1999	Catalina	CSS	·	4.0 km	MPC · JPL
121482	1999 TC_{241}	—	October 4, 1999	Catalina	CSS	·	3.4 km	MPC · JPL
121483 Griffinjayne	1999 TO_{242}	Griffinjayne	October 4, 1999	Catalina	CSS	·	6.3 km	MPC · JPL
121484	1999 TP_{243}	—	October 6, 1999	Kitt Peak	Spacewatch	·	4.6 km	MPC · JPL
121485	1999 TF_{244}	—	October 7, 1999	Catalina	CSS	HYG	5.2 km	MPC · JPL
121486 Sarahkirby	1999 TX_{245}	Sarahkirby	October 7, 1999	Catalina	CSS	H	1.0 km	MPC · JPL
121487	1999 TY_{253}	—	October 11, 1999	Anderson Mesa	LONEOS	·	3.6 km	MPC · JPL
121488	1999 TH_{254}	—	October 8, 1999	Catalina	CSS	TIN	4.0 km	MPC · JPL
121489	1999 TP_{255}	—	October 9, 1999	Kitt Peak	Spacewatch	·	5.3 km	MPC · JPL
121490	1999 TQ_{255}	—	October 9, 1999	Kitt Peak	Spacewatch	AGN	2.1 km	MPC · JPL
121491	1999 TV_{256}	—	October 9, 1999	Socorro	LINEAR	·	4.1 km	MPC · JPL
121492	1999 TN_{262}	—	October 15, 1999	Anderson Mesa	LONEOS	·	3.1 km	MPC · JPL
121493	1999 TO_{263}	—	October 15, 1999	Kitt Peak	Spacewatch	·	2.8 km	MPC · JPL
121494	1999 TE_{267}	—	October 3, 1999	Socorro	LINEAR	·	5.2 km	MPC · JPL
121495	1999 TQ_{267}	—	October 3, 1999	Socorro	LINEAR	BRA	3.6 km	MPC · JPL
121496	1999 TB_{269}	—	October 3, 1999	Socorro	LINEAR	·	4.2 km	MPC · JPL
121497	1999 TN_{270}	—	October 3, 1999	Socorro	LINEAR	·	2.9 km	MPC · JPL
121498	1999 TB_{272}	—	October 3, 1999	Socorro	LINEAR	·	4.3 km	MPC · JPL
121499	1999 TD_{272}	—	October 3, 1999	Socorro	LINEAR	·	4.0 km	MPC · JPL
121500	1999 TF_{273}	—	October 5, 1999	Socorro	LINEAR	·	6.2 km	MPC · JPL

== 121501–121600 ==
back to top

Designation			Discovery			Properties		Ref
Permanent	Provisional	Named after	Date	Site	Discoverer(s)	Category	Diam.	Ref
121501	1999 TH_{273}	—	October 5, 1999	Socorro	LINEAR	H	1.7 km	MPC · JPL
121502	1999 TR_{273}	—	October 5, 1999	Socorro	LINEAR	TIR	5.0 km	MPC · JPL
121503	1999 TZ_{289}	—	October 10, 1999	Socorro	LINEAR	·	2.5 km	MPC · JPL
121504	1999 TU_{292}	—	October 12, 1999	Socorro	LINEAR	EOS	3.2 km	MPC · JPL
121505 Andrewliounis	1999 TC_{296}	Andrewliounis	October 1, 1999	Catalina	CSS	HOF	3.3 km	MPC · JPL
121506 Chrislorentson	1999 TA_{300}	Chrislorentson	October 3, 1999	Catalina	CSS	·	3.9 km	MPC · JPL
121507	1999 TU_{304}	—	October 4, 1999	Kitt Peak	Spacewatch	·	4.2 km	MPC · JPL
121508	1999 TY_{307}	—	October 4, 1999	Kitt Peak	Spacewatch	·	4.8 km	MPC · JPL
121509	1999 TW_{308}	—	October 6, 1999	Kitt Peak	Spacewatch	·	3.9 km	MPC · JPL
121510	1999 TS_{309}	—	October 3, 1999	Kitt Peak	Spacewatch	KOR	2.3 km	MPC · JPL
121511	1999 TD_{319}	—	October 9, 1999	Socorro	LINEAR	·	1.7 km	MPC · JPL
121512	1999 TR_{322}	—	October 5, 1999	Socorro	LINEAR	H	1.0 km	MPC · JPL
121513	1999 UJ_{6}	—	October 28, 1999	Xinglong	SCAP	·	3.9 km	MPC · JPL
121514	1999 UJ_{7}	—	October 30, 1999	Socorro	LINEAR	·	2.5 km	MPC · JPL
121515	1999 US_{10}	—	October 31, 1999	Socorro	LINEAR	H	2.0 km	MPC · JPL
121516	1999 UG_{11}	—	October 31, 1999	Socorro	LINEAR	T_{j} (2.98)	8.0 km	MPC · JPL
121517	1999 UO_{11}	—	October 31, 1999	Gnosca	S. Sposetti	·	3.6 km	MPC · JPL
121518	1999 UA_{12}	—	October 29, 1999	Kitt Peak	Spacewatch	·	3.7 km	MPC · JPL
121519	1999 UV_{17}	—	October 30, 1999	Kitt Peak	Spacewatch	AST	3.9 km	MPC · JPL
121520	1999 UE_{27}	—	October 30, 1999	Kitt Peak	Spacewatch	·	2.2 km	MPC · JPL
121521	1999 UT_{27}	—	October 30, 1999	Kitt Peak	Spacewatch	·	3.2 km	MPC · JPL
121522	1999 UU_{27}	—	October 30, 1999	Kitt Peak	Spacewatch	·	2.9 km	MPC · JPL
121523	1999 UP_{28}	—	October 31, 1999	Kitt Peak	Spacewatch	·	2.9 km	MPC · JPL
121524	1999 UA_{29}	—	October 31, 1999	Kitt Peak	Spacewatch	·	3.0 km	MPC · JPL
121525	1999 UE_{29}	—	October 31, 1999	Kitt Peak	Spacewatch	·	2.7 km	MPC · JPL
121526	1999 UN_{30}	—	October 31, 1999	Kitt Peak	Spacewatch	·	4.6 km	MPC · JPL
121527	1999 UV_{30}	—	October 31, 1999	Kitt Peak	Spacewatch	·	4.8 km	MPC · JPL
121528	1999 UX_{32}	—	October 31, 1999	Kitt Peak	Spacewatch	·	3.2 km	MPC · JPL
121529	1999 UY_{33}	—	October 31, 1999	Kitt Peak	Spacewatch	·	3.5 km	MPC · JPL
121530	1999 UG_{36}	—	October 16, 1999	Kitt Peak	Spacewatch	(7744)	3.1 km	MPC · JPL
121531	1999 UV_{36}	—	October 16, 1999	Kitt Peak	Spacewatch	AGN	1.9 km	MPC · JPL
121532	1999 UD_{40}	—	October 16, 1999	Socorro	LINEAR	·	4.0 km	MPC · JPL
121533	1999 UW_{40}	—	October 16, 1999	Socorro	LINEAR	BRA	3.3 km	MPC · JPL
121534	1999 UJ_{41}	—	October 18, 1999	Kitt Peak	Spacewatch	slow	3.6 km	MPC · JPL
121535	1999 UQ_{41}	—	October 18, 1999	Kitt Peak	Spacewatch	·	2.9 km	MPC · JPL
121536 Brianburt	1999 UY_{46}	Brianburt	October 30, 1999	Anderson Mesa	LONEOS	MAR	3.2 km	MPC · JPL
121537 Lorenzdavid	1999 UG_{48}	Lorenzdavid	October 30, 1999	Catalina	CSS	·	7.6 km	MPC · JPL
121538	1999 UA_{49}	—	October 31, 1999	Catalina	CSS	·	6.3 km	MPC · JPL
121539	1999 UD_{50}	—	October 30, 1999	Catalina	CSS	·	3.8 km	MPC · JPL
121540 Jamesmarsh	1999 UU_{51}	Jamesmarsh	October 31, 1999	Catalina	CSS	·	5.5 km	MPC · JPL
121541	1999 UZ_{51}	—	October 31, 1999	Gnosca	S. Sposetti	·	2.6 km	MPC · JPL
121542 Alindamashiku	1999 UW_{56}	Alindamashiku	October 29, 1999	Catalina	CSS	EOS	3.2 km	MPC · JPL
121543	1999 VG_{1}	—	November 3, 1999	Baton Rouge	W. R. Cooney Jr., P. M. Motl	·	5.2 km	MPC · JPL
121544	1999 VJ_{1}	—	November 3, 1999	Baton Rouge	W. R. Cooney Jr., P. M. Motl	·	5.3 km	MPC · JPL
121545	1999 VA_{3}	—	November 1, 1999	Kitt Peak	Spacewatch	·	4.4 km	MPC · JPL
121546 Straulino	1999 VU_{11}	Straulino	November 5, 1999	San Marcello	L. Tesi, A. Boattini	·	4.6 km	MPC · JPL
121547 Fenghuotongxin	1999 VS_{20}	Fenghuotongxin	November 11, 1999	Xinglong	SCAP	H	1.1 km	MPC · JPL
121548	1999 VH_{31}	—	November 3, 1999	Socorro	LINEAR	·	5.2 km	MPC · JPL
121549	1999 VC_{32}	—	November 3, 1999	Socorro	LINEAR	·	2.7 km	MPC · JPL
121550	1999 VQ_{32}	—	November 3, 1999	Socorro	LINEAR	·	3.4 km	MPC · JPL
121551	1999 VT_{33}	—	November 3, 1999	Socorro	LINEAR	·	4.6 km	MPC · JPL
121552	1999 VU_{36}	—	November 3, 1999	Socorro	LINEAR	EOS	4.3 km	MPC · JPL
121553	1999 VL_{39}	—	November 10, 1999	Socorro	LINEAR	·	3.0 km	MPC · JPL
121554	1999 VN_{39}	—	November 10, 1999	Socorro	LINEAR	·	3.1 km	MPC · JPL
121555	1999 VF_{41}	—	November 1, 1999	Kitt Peak	Spacewatch	·	3.8 km	MPC · JPL
121556	1999 VX_{41}	—	November 4, 1999	Kitt Peak	Spacewatch	·	4.6 km	MPC · JPL
121557 Paulmason	1999 VF_{44}	Paulmason	November 3, 1999	Catalina	CSS	LIX	6.2 km	MPC · JPL
121558	1999 VR_{47}	—	November 3, 1999	Socorro	LINEAR	·	6.2 km	MPC · JPL
121559	1999 VL_{48}	—	November 3, 1999	Socorro	LINEAR	·	3.3 km	MPC · JPL
121560	1999 VZ_{48}	—	November 3, 1999	Socorro	LINEAR	·	4.0 km	MPC · JPL
121561	1999 VN_{51}	—	November 3, 1999	Socorro	LINEAR	·	6.3 km	MPC · JPL
121562	1999 VQ_{51}	—	November 3, 1999	Socorro	LINEAR	·	4.9 km	MPC · JPL
121563	1999 VV_{51}	—	November 3, 1999	Socorro	LINEAR	KOR	3.2 km	MPC · JPL
121564	1999 VS_{55}	—	November 4, 1999	Socorro	LINEAR	·	3.1 km	MPC · JPL
121565	1999 VV_{55}	—	November 4, 1999	Socorro	LINEAR	·	2.8 km	MPC · JPL
121566	1999 VH_{59}	—	November 4, 1999	Socorro	LINEAR	·	3.1 km	MPC · JPL
121567	1999 VG_{60}	—	November 4, 1999	Socorro	LINEAR	·	3.4 km	MPC · JPL
121568	1999 VN_{62}	—	November 4, 1999	Socorro	LINEAR	KOR	2.7 km	MPC · JPL
121569	1999 VT_{69}	—	November 4, 1999	Socorro	LINEAR	KOR	2.4 km	MPC · JPL
121570	1999 VU_{74}	—	November 5, 1999	Kitt Peak	Spacewatch	·	3.0 km	MPC · JPL
121571	1999 VC_{76}	—	November 5, 1999	Kitt Peak	Spacewatch	THM	4.6 km	MPC · JPL
121572	1999 VB_{87}	—	November 7, 1999	Socorro	LINEAR	·	4.5 km	MPC · JPL
121573	1999 VZ_{87}	—	November 8, 1999	Socorro	LINEAR	H	1.6 km	MPC · JPL
121574	1999 VS_{90}	—	November 5, 1999	Socorro	LINEAR	·	3.1 km	MPC · JPL
121575	1999 VV_{90}	—	November 5, 1999	Socorro	LINEAR	·	4.0 km	MPC · JPL
121576	1999 VL_{97}	—	November 9, 1999	Socorro	LINEAR	KOR	2.6 km	MPC · JPL
121577	1999 VO_{97}	—	November 9, 1999	Socorro	LINEAR	KOR	2.2 km	MPC · JPL
121578	1999 VG_{98}	—	November 9, 1999	Socorro	LINEAR	·	6.1 km	MPC · JPL
121579	1999 VO_{98}	—	November 9, 1999	Socorro	LINEAR	·	3.1 km	MPC · JPL
121580	1999 VR_{99}	—	November 9, 1999	Socorro	LINEAR	·	4.3 km	MPC · JPL
121581	1999 VK_{101}	—	November 9, 1999	Socorro	LINEAR	THM	4.2 km	MPC · JPL
121582	1999 VT_{101}	—	November 9, 1999	Socorro	LINEAR	·	3.6 km	MPC · JPL
121583	1999 VO_{102}	—	November 9, 1999	Socorro	LINEAR	·	3.0 km	MPC · JPL
121584	1999 VW_{102}	—	November 9, 1999	Socorro	LINEAR	·	3.1 km	MPC · JPL
121585	1999 VE_{103}	—	November 9, 1999	Socorro	LINEAR	·	3.1 km	MPC · JPL
121586	1999 VS_{104}	—	November 9, 1999	Socorro	LINEAR	THM	4.4 km	MPC · JPL
121587	1999 VJ_{105}	—	November 9, 1999	Socorro	LINEAR	·	2.7 km	MPC · JPL
121588	1999 VL_{105}	—	November 9, 1999	Socorro	LINEAR	KOR	2.8 km	MPC · JPL
121589	1999 VJ_{110}	—	November 9, 1999	Socorro	LINEAR	·	2.4 km	MPC · JPL
121590	1999 VM_{110}	—	November 9, 1999	Socorro	LINEAR	·	5.7 km	MPC · JPL
121591	1999 VN_{111}	—	November 9, 1999	Socorro	LINEAR	THM	4.6 km	MPC · JPL
121592	1999 VJ_{113}	—	November 9, 1999	Socorro	LINEAR	·	4.9 km	MPC · JPL
121593 Kevinmiller	1999 VY_{114}	Kevinmiller	November 9, 1999	Catalina	CSS	·	5.5 km	MPC · JPL
121594 Zubritsky	1999 VD_{115}	Zubritsky	November 9, 1999	Catalina	CSS	·	6.5 km	MPC · JPL
121595	1999 VT_{125}	—	November 6, 1999	Kitt Peak	Spacewatch	·	5.8 km	MPC · JPL
121596	1999 VX_{128}	—	November 9, 1999	Kitt Peak	Spacewatch	KOR	1.8 km	MPC · JPL
121597	1999 VC_{130}	—	November 11, 1999	Kitt Peak	Spacewatch	·	2.8 km	MPC · JPL
121598	1999 VO_{130}	—	November 9, 1999	Kitt Peak	Spacewatch	fast	5.4 km	MPC · JPL
121599	1999 VF_{135}	—	November 13, 1999	Kitt Peak	Spacewatch	·	2.1 km	MPC · JPL
121600	1999 VZ_{135}	—	November 9, 1999	Socorro	LINEAR	·	3.9 km	MPC · JPL

== 121601–121700 ==
back to top

Designation			Discovery			Properties		Ref
Permanent	Provisional	Named after	Date	Site	Discoverer(s)	Category	Diam.	Ref
121601	1999 VP_{136}	—	November 9, 1999	Socorro	LINEAR	CYB	6.3 km	MPC · JPL
121602	1999 VU_{136}	—	November 12, 1999	Socorro	LINEAR	HYG	4.7 km	MPC · JPL
121603	1999 VV_{136}	—	November 12, 1999	Socorro	LINEAR	·	4.5 km	MPC · JPL
121604	1999 VF_{137}	—	November 12, 1999	Socorro	LINEAR	·	2.7 km	MPC · JPL
121605	1999 VF_{138}	—	November 9, 1999	Kitt Peak	Spacewatch	·	6.0 km	MPC · JPL
121606	1999 VG_{140}	—	November 10, 1999	Kitt Peak	Spacewatch	·	3.0 km	MPC · JPL
121607	1999 VG_{142}	—	November 10, 1999	Kitt Peak	Spacewatch	THM	6.6 km	MPC · JPL
121608 Mikemoreau	1999 VL_{144}	Mikemoreau	November 11, 1999	Catalina	CSS	·	6.1 km	MPC · JPL
121609 Josephnicholas	1999 VV_{144}	Josephnicholas	November 13, 1999	Catalina	CSS	TIR	4.8 km	MPC · JPL
121610	1999 VW_{147}	—	November 14, 1999	Socorro	LINEAR	EOS	3.7 km	MPC · JPL
121611	1999 VD_{149}	—	November 14, 1999	Socorro	LINEAR	·	4.8 km	MPC · JPL
121612	1999 VD_{150}	—	November 14, 1999	Socorro	LINEAR	·	2.7 km	MPC · JPL
121613	1999 VC_{151}	—	November 14, 1999	Socorro	LINEAR	·	3.9 km	MPC · JPL
121614	1999 VA_{153}	—	November 11, 1999	Kitt Peak	Spacewatch	·	3.7 km	MPC · JPL
121615 Marknoteware	1999 VC_{154}	Marknoteware	November 13, 1999	Catalina	CSS	·	5.6 km	MPC · JPL
121616	1999 VA_{155}	—	November 13, 1999	Kitt Peak	Spacewatch	·	3.2 km	MPC · JPL
121617	1999 VX_{157}	—	November 14, 1999	Socorro	LINEAR	·	5.1 km	MPC · JPL
121618	1999 VL_{158}	—	November 14, 1999	Socorro	LINEAR	·	3.3 km	MPC · JPL
121619	1999 VV_{163}	—	November 14, 1999	Socorro	LINEAR	HYG	4.5 km	MPC · JPL
121620	1999 VB_{166}	—	November 14, 1999	Socorro	LINEAR	·	4.4 km	MPC · JPL
121621	1999 VP_{167}	—	November 14, 1999	Socorro	LINEAR	·	6.3 km	MPC · JPL
121622	1999 VT_{167}	—	November 14, 1999	Socorro	LINEAR	·	4.6 km	MPC · JPL
121623	1999 VH_{169}	—	November 14, 1999	Socorro	LINEAR	·	4.1 km	MPC · JPL
121624	1999 VN_{173}	—	November 15, 1999	Socorro	LINEAR	·	4.5 km	MPC · JPL
121625	1999 VW_{177}	—	November 6, 1999	Socorro	LINEAR	·	5.7 km	MPC · JPL
121626	1999 VR_{178}	—	November 6, 1999	Socorro	LINEAR	·	4.6 km	MPC · JPL
121627	1999 VO_{182}	—	November 9, 1999	Socorro	LINEAR	·	3.2 km	MPC · JPL
121628	1999 VP_{183}	—	November 12, 1999	Socorro	LINEAR	·	3.5 km	MPC · JPL
121629	1999 VZ_{183}	—	November 15, 1999	Socorro	LINEAR	·	4.0 km	MPC · JPL
121630	1999 VD_{187}	—	November 15, 1999	Socorro	LINEAR	·	2.3 km	MPC · JPL
121631 Josephnuth	1999 VO_{196}	Josephnuth	November 1, 1999	Catalina	CSS	·	5.6 km	MPC · JPL
121632	1999 VS_{196}	—	November 1, 1999	Catalina	CSS	·	6.2 km	MPC · JPL
121633 Ronperison	1999 VO_{197}	Ronperison	November 3, 1999	Catalina	CSS	·	3.9 km	MPC · JPL
121634	1999 VX_{199}	—	November 4, 1999	Anderson Mesa	LONEOS	·	2.5 km	MPC · JPL
121635	1999 VQ_{200}	—	November 3, 1999	Socorro	LINEAR	LIX	7.5 km	MPC · JPL
121636	1999 VT_{208}	—	November 12, 1999	Socorro	LINEAR	·	3.5 km	MPC · JPL
121637 Druscillaperry	1999 VR_{210}	Druscillaperry	November 13, 1999	Catalina	CSS	·	4.8 km	MPC · JPL
121638	1999 VK_{216}	—	November 3, 1999	Socorro	LINEAR	·	7.0 km	MPC · JPL
121639	1999 VT_{217}	—	November 5, 1999	Socorro	LINEAR	THM	4.0 km	MPC · JPL
121640	1999 VK_{221}	—	November 4, 1999	Socorro	LINEAR	EOS	3.1 km	MPC · JPL
121641	1999 VF_{225}	—	November 5, 1999	Socorro	LINEAR	·	5.1 km	MPC · JPL
121642	1999 VJ_{227}	—	November 1, 1999	Socorro	LINEAR	EUP	7.6 km	MPC · JPL
121643	1999 WN_{1}	—	November 28, 1999	Kleť	Kleť	TEL	3.0 km	MPC · JPL
121644	1999 WN_{6}	—	November 28, 1999	Višnjan Observatory	K. Korlević	·	5.6 km	MPC · JPL
121645	1999 WQ_{7}	—	November 28, 1999	Višnjan Observatory	K. Korlević	·	5.3 km	MPC · JPL
121646	1999 WZ_{7}	—	November 27, 1999	Monte Agliale	Ziboli, M.	TIR	5.7 km	MPC · JPL
121647	1999 WF_{10}	—	November 28, 1999	Kitt Peak	Spacewatch	·	3.8 km	MPC · JPL
121648	1999 WF_{11}	—	November 30, 1999	Kitt Peak	Spacewatch	KOR	2.2 km	MPC · JPL
121649	1999 WK_{17}	—	November 30, 1999	Kitt Peak	Spacewatch	·	3.5 km	MPC · JPL
121650	1999 WR_{18}	—	November 30, 1999	Kitt Peak	Spacewatch	THM	3.1 km	MPC · JPL
121651	1999 WY_{18}	—	November 30, 1999	Kitt Peak	Spacewatch	·	4.9 km	MPC · JPL
121652	1999 WE_{19}	—	November 30, 1999	Kitt Peak	Spacewatch	KOR	2.1 km	MPC · JPL
121653	1999 XV	—	December 2, 1999	Socorro	LINEAR	H	1.2 km	MPC · JPL
121654 Michaelpryzby	1999 XY_{2}	Michaelpryzby	December 4, 1999	Catalina	CSS	HYG	5.7 km	MPC · JPL
121655 Nitapszcolka	1999 XY_{4}	Nitapszcolka	December 4, 1999	Catalina	CSS	·	4.3 km	MPC · JPL
121656 Jamesrogers	1999 XM_{5}	Jamesrogers	December 4, 1999	Catalina	CSS	AEG	9.1 km	MPC · JPL
121657	1999 XL_{6}	—	December 4, 1999	Catalina	CSS	·	4.8 km	MPC · JPL
121658	1999 XU_{8}	—	December 5, 1999	Socorro	LINEAR	H	1.1 km	MPC · JPL
121659 Blairrussell	1999 XX_{10}	Blairrussell	December 5, 1999	Catalina	CSS	TIR	4.3 km	MPC · JPL
121660	1999 XW_{19}	—	December 5, 1999	Socorro	LINEAR	H	1.2 km	MPC · JPL
121661	1999 XQ_{21}	—	December 5, 1999	Socorro	LINEAR	·	5.2 km	MPC · JPL
121662	1999 XP_{26}	—	December 6, 1999	Socorro	LINEAR	·	3.4 km	MPC · JPL
121663	1999 XC_{31}	—	December 6, 1999	Socorro	LINEAR	·	4.1 km	MPC · JPL
121664	1999 XG_{38}	—	December 3, 1999	Uenohara	N. Kawasato	·	3.9 km	MPC · JPL
121665	1999 XR_{38}	—	December 8, 1999	Socorro	LINEAR	·	5.7 km	MPC · JPL
121666	1999 XM_{40}	—	December 7, 1999	Socorro	LINEAR	HYG	4.4 km	MPC · JPL
121667	1999 XQ_{40}	—	December 7, 1999	Socorro	LINEAR	·	3.3 km	MPC · JPL
121668	1999 XN_{45}	—	December 7, 1999	Socorro	LINEAR	·	4.3 km	MPC · JPL
121669	1999 XD_{46}	—	December 7, 1999	Socorro	LINEAR	·	3.6 km	MPC · JPL
121670	1999 XU_{46}	—	December 7, 1999	Socorro	LINEAR	KOR	3.3 km	MPC · JPL
121671	1999 XG_{47}	—	December 7, 1999	Socorro	LINEAR	·	3.5 km	MPC · JPL
121672	1999 XM_{47}	—	December 7, 1999	Socorro	LINEAR	KOR	2.7 km	MPC · JPL
121673	1999 XF_{51}	—	December 7, 1999	Socorro	LINEAR	THM	4.2 km	MPC · JPL
121674	1999 XQ_{52}	—	December 7, 1999	Socorro	LINEAR	·	4.9 km	MPC · JPL
121675	1999 XS_{52}	—	December 7, 1999	Socorro	LINEAR	·	4.7 km	MPC · JPL
121676	1999 XM_{54}	—	December 7, 1999	Socorro	LINEAR	EOS	3.5 km	MPC · JPL
121677	1999 XN_{55}	—	December 7, 1999	Socorro	LINEAR	·	4.9 km	MPC · JPL
121678	1999 XJ_{56}	—	December 7, 1999	Socorro	LINEAR	·	3.5 km	MPC · JPL
121679	1999 XY_{56}	—	December 7, 1999	Socorro	LINEAR	·	1.8 km	MPC · JPL
121680	1999 XJ_{57}	—	December 7, 1999	Socorro	LINEAR	THM	3.1 km	MPC · JPL
121681	1999 XO_{58}	—	December 7, 1999	Socorro	LINEAR	·	7.0 km	MPC · JPL
121682	1999 XH_{59}	—	December 7, 1999	Socorro	LINEAR	·	6.1 km	MPC · JPL
121683	1999 XF_{60}	—	December 7, 1999	Socorro	LINEAR	·	3.9 km	MPC · JPL
121684	1999 XH_{60}	—	December 7, 1999	Socorro	LINEAR	·	5.6 km	MPC · JPL
121685	1999 XL_{60}	—	December 7, 1999	Socorro	LINEAR	·	5.3 km	MPC · JPL
121686	1999 XM_{61}	—	December 7, 1999	Socorro	LINEAR	THM	3.2 km	MPC · JPL
121687	1999 XT_{62}	—	December 7, 1999	Socorro	LINEAR	·	3.5 km	MPC · JPL
121688	1999 XA_{63}	—	December 7, 1999	Socorro	LINEAR	·	4.2 km	MPC · JPL
121689	1999 XB_{64}	—	December 7, 1999	Socorro	LINEAR	EOS	4.3 km	MPC · JPL
121690	1999 XP_{64}	—	December 7, 1999	Socorro	LINEAR	·	5.2 km	MPC · JPL
121691	1999 XY_{64}	—	December 7, 1999	Socorro	LINEAR	·	3.4 km	MPC · JPL
121692	1999 XD_{65}	—	December 7, 1999	Socorro	LINEAR	·	3.5 km	MPC · JPL
121693	1999 XF_{66}	—	December 7, 1999	Socorro	LINEAR	·	4.2 km	MPC · JPL
121694	1999 XF_{67}	—	December 7, 1999	Socorro	LINEAR	THM	4.5 km	MPC · JPL
121695	1999 XP_{68}	—	December 7, 1999	Socorro	LINEAR	·	5.2 km	MPC · JPL
121696	1999 XD_{69}	—	December 7, 1999	Socorro	LINEAR	HYG	5.5 km	MPC · JPL
121697	1999 XD_{73}	—	December 7, 1999	Socorro	LINEAR	·	8.5 km	MPC · JPL
121698	1999 XM_{73}	—	December 7, 1999	Socorro	LINEAR	EOS	3.5 km	MPC · JPL
121699	1999 XS_{76}	—	December 7, 1999	Socorro	LINEAR	·	3.8 km	MPC · JPL
121700	1999 XX_{77}	—	December 7, 1999	Socorro	LINEAR	EOS	4.6 km	MPC · JPL

== 121701–121800 ==
back to top

Designation			Discovery			Properties		Ref
Permanent	Provisional	Named after	Date	Site	Discoverer(s)	Category	Diam.	Ref
121701	1999 XR_{78}	—	December 7, 1999	Socorro	LINEAR	·	6.8 km	MPC · JPL
121702	1999 XU_{80}	—	December 7, 1999	Socorro	LINEAR	KOR	2.9 km	MPC · JPL
121703	1999 XZ_{83}	—	December 7, 1999	Socorro	LINEAR	·	7.3 km	MPC · JPL
121704	1999 XW_{88}	—	December 7, 1999	Socorro	LINEAR	HYG	5.7 km	MPC · JPL
121705	1999 XY_{90}	—	December 7, 1999	Socorro	LINEAR	·	5.4 km	MPC · JPL
121706	1999 XE_{95}	—	December 9, 1999	Prescott	P. G. Comba	LIX	6.6 km	MPC · JPL
121707	1999 XY_{99}	—	December 7, 1999	Socorro	LINEAR	·	7.3 km	MPC · JPL
121708	1999 XT_{100}	—	December 7, 1999	Socorro	LINEAR	·	11 km	MPC · JPL
121709	1999 XJ_{106}	—	December 11, 1999	Prescott	P. G. Comba	EOS	4.9 km	MPC · JPL
121710	1999 XB_{112}	—	December 7, 1999	Socorro	LINEAR	LIX	7.5 km	MPC · JPL
121711	1999 XW_{112}	—	December 11, 1999	Socorro	LINEAR	·	9.6 km	MPC · JPL
121712	1999 XS_{113}	—	December 11, 1999	Socorro	LINEAR	TIR	5.5 km	MPC · JPL
121713	1999 XT_{113}	—	December 11, 1999	Socorro	LINEAR	(5931)	7.8 km	MPC · JPL
121714	1999 XZ_{115}	—	December 5, 1999	Catalina	CSS	·	5.1 km	MPC · JPL
121715 Katiesalamy	1999 XC_{120}	Katiesalamy	December 5, 1999	Catalina	CSS	HYG	4.9 km	MPC · JPL
121716 Victorsank	1999 XL_{122}	Victorsank	December 7, 1999	Catalina	CSS	·	8.1 km	MPC · JPL
121717 Josephschepis	1999 XA_{123}	Josephschepis	December 7, 1999	Catalina	CSS	·	4.8 km	MPC · JPL
121718 Ashleyscroggins	1999 XE_{125}	Ashleyscroggins	December 7, 1999	Catalina	CSS	·	6.0 km	MPC · JPL
121719 Georgeshaw	1999 XW_{126}	Georgeshaw	December 7, 1999	Catalina	CSS	·	4.7 km	MPC · JPL
121720	1999 XF_{131}	—	December 12, 1999	Socorro	LINEAR	EOS ·	5.6 km	MPC · JPL
121721	1999 XY_{131}	—	December 12, 1999	Socorro	LINEAR	·	5.6 km	MPC · JPL
121722	1999 XZ_{137}	—	December 2, 1999	Kitt Peak	Spacewatch	·	3.9 km	MPC · JPL
121723	1999 XL_{139}	—	December 2, 1999	Kitt Peak	Spacewatch	HYG	5.8 km	MPC · JPL
121724	1999 XG_{141}	—	December 3, 1999	Kitt Peak	Spacewatch	HYG	4.9 km	MPC · JPL
121725 Aphidas	1999 XX_{143}	Aphidas	December 13, 1999	Mount Hopkins	C. W. Hergenrother	centaur	90 km	MPC · JPL
121726	1999 XU_{148}	—	December 7, 1999	Kitt Peak	Spacewatch	AGN	2.0 km	MPC · JPL
121727	1999 XQ_{155}	—	December 8, 1999	Socorro	LINEAR	AGN	2.6 km	MPC · JPL
121728	1999 XV_{160}	—	December 8, 1999	Socorro	LINEAR	·	5.3 km	MPC · JPL
121729	1999 XV_{165}	—	December 8, 1999	Socorro	LINEAR	TIR	5.5 km	MPC · JPL
121730	1999 XM_{170}	—	December 10, 1999	Socorro	LINEAR	·	2.7 km	MPC · JPL
121731	1999 XU_{170}	—	December 10, 1999	Socorro	LINEAR	·	7.8 km	MPC · JPL
121732	1999 XB_{171}	—	December 10, 1999	Socorro	LINEAR	·	7.0 km	MPC · JPL
121733	1999 XR_{172}	—	December 10, 1999	Socorro	LINEAR	(5931)	9.1 km	MPC · JPL
121734	1999 XF_{178}	—	December 10, 1999	Socorro	LINEAR	TIR	6.3 km	MPC · JPL
121735	1999 XD_{185}	—	December 12, 1999	Socorro	LINEAR	·	7.5 km	MPC · JPL
121736	1999 XR_{186}	—	December 12, 1999	Socorro	LINEAR	·	7.7 km	MPC · JPL
121737	1999 XY_{190}	—	December 12, 1999	Socorro	LINEAR	·	5.2 km	MPC · JPL
121738	1999 XF_{191}	—	December 12, 1999	Socorro	LINEAR	·	7.4 km	MPC · JPL
121739	1999 XT_{191}	—	December 12, 1999	Socorro	LINEAR	LIX	6.0 km	MPC · JPL
121740	1999 XU_{196}	—	December 12, 1999	Socorro	LINEAR	·	5.4 km	MPC · JPL
121741	1999 XT_{198}	—	December 12, 1999	Socorro	LINEAR	·	5.2 km	MPC · JPL
121742	1999 XX_{203}	—	December 12, 1999	Socorro	LINEAR	TIR	5.3 km	MPC · JPL
121743	1999 XH_{205}	—	December 12, 1999	Socorro	LINEAR	·	6.2 km	MPC · JPL
121744	1999 XV_{205}	—	December 12, 1999	Socorro	LINEAR	T_{j} (2.9)	8.9 km	MPC · JPL
121745	1999 XN_{207}	—	December 12, 1999	Socorro	LINEAR	·	2.6 km	MPC · JPL
121746	1999 XV_{207}	—	December 12, 1999	Socorro	LINEAR	CYB	8.0 km	MPC · JPL
121747	1999 XY_{210}	—	December 13, 1999	Socorro	LINEAR	·	5.4 km	MPC · JPL
121748	1999 XA_{212}	—	December 13, 1999	Socorro	LINEAR	TIR	4.7 km	MPC · JPL
121749	1999 XU_{217}	—	December 13, 1999	Kitt Peak	Spacewatch	·	4.6 km	MPC · JPL
121750	1999 XE_{222}	—	December 15, 1999	Socorro	LINEAR	·	5.3 km	MPC · JPL
121751	1999 XO_{228}	—	December 14, 1999	Kitt Peak	Spacewatch	THM	4.8 km	MPC · JPL
121752	1999 XV_{234}	—	December 3, 1999	Anderson Mesa	LONEOS	·	5.0 km	MPC · JPL
121753	1999 XP_{247}	—	December 6, 1999	Socorro	LINEAR	·	5.6 km	MPC · JPL
121754	1999 XO_{252}	—	December 12, 1999	Kitt Peak	Spacewatch	·	5.3 km	MPC · JPL
121755	1999 XY_{253}	—	December 12, 1999	Kitt Peak	Spacewatch	·	2.6 km	MPC · JPL
121756 Sotomejias	1999 XA_{257}	Sotomejias	December 7, 1999	Catalina	CSS	·	3.1 km	MPC · JPL
121757	1999 YZ_{1}	—	December 16, 1999	Kitt Peak	Spacewatch	KOR	2.3 km	MPC · JPL
121758	1999 YT_{3}	—	December 19, 1999	Socorro	LINEAR	T_{j} (2.99)	7.6 km	MPC · JPL
121759	1999 YU_{3}	—	December 19, 1999	Socorro	LINEAR	EUP	7.6 km	MPC · JPL
121760	1999 YY_{4}	—	December 28, 1999	Prescott	P. G. Comba	·	5.5 km	MPC · JPL
121761	1999 YZ_{6}	—	December 30, 1999	Socorro	LINEAR	·	7.7 km	MPC · JPL
121762	1999 YW_{8}	—	December 30, 1999	Prescott	P. G. Comba	(31811)	5.2 km	MPC · JPL
121763	1999 YA_{10}	—	December 27, 1999	Kitt Peak	Spacewatch	HYG	5.9 km	MPC · JPL
121764	1999 YH_{13}	—	December 31, 1999	Farpoint	G. Hug, G. Bell	·	4.0 km	MPC · JPL
121765	1999 YF_{15}	—	December 31, 1999	Kitt Peak	Spacewatch	·	5.6 km	MPC · JPL
121766	1999 YG_{15}	—	December 31, 1999	Kitt Peak	Spacewatch	·	3.5 km	MPC · JPL
121767	1999 YK_{15}	—	December 31, 1999	Kitt Peak	Spacewatch	KOR	2.2 km	MPC · JPL
121768	1999 YH_{17}	—	December 31, 1999	Kitt Peak	Spacewatch	THM	3.7 km	MPC · JPL
121769	1999 YF_{23}	—	December 31, 1999	Anderson Mesa	LONEOS	TIR	4.6 km	MPC · JPL
121770	2000 AV_{2}	—	January 1, 2000	San Marcello	A. Boattini, G. Forti	slow	7.5 km	MPC · JPL
121771	2000 AN_{3}	—	January 2, 2000	Socorro	LINEAR	·	6.1 km	MPC · JPL
121772	2000 AA_{20}	—	January 3, 2000	Socorro	LINEAR	·	2.7 km	MPC · JPL
121773	2000 AZ_{23}	—	January 3, 2000	Socorro	LINEAR	HYG	6.1 km	MPC · JPL
121774	2000 AU_{24}	—	January 3, 2000	Socorro	LINEAR	·	4.0 km	MPC · JPL
121775	2000 AF_{29}	—	January 3, 2000	Socorro	LINEAR	HYG	5.9 km	MPC · JPL
121776	2000 AH_{30}	—	January 3, 2000	Socorro	LINEAR	·	9.2 km	MPC · JPL
121777	2000 AD_{32}	—	January 3, 2000	Socorro	LINEAR	·	7.6 km	MPC · JPL
121778	2000 AB_{37}	—	January 3, 2000	Socorro	LINEAR	·	4.8 km	MPC · JPL
121779	2000 AO_{40}	—	January 3, 2000	Socorro	LINEAR	·	1.8 km	MPC · JPL
121780	2000 AG_{51}	—	January 3, 2000	Socorro	LINEAR	·	6.7 km	MPC · JPL
121781	2000 AA_{55}	—	January 4, 2000	Socorro	LINEAR	·	6.3 km	MPC · JPL
121782	2000 AL_{66}	—	January 4, 2000	Socorro	LINEAR	·	7.6 km	MPC · JPL
121783	2000 AM_{80}	—	January 5, 2000	Socorro	LINEAR	·	6.0 km	MPC · JPL
121784	2000 AS_{82}	—	January 5, 2000	Socorro	LINEAR	·	7.2 km	MPC · JPL
121785	2000 AM_{83}	—	January 5, 2000	Socorro	LINEAR	·	6.9 km	MPC · JPL
121786	2000 AB_{89}	—	January 5, 2000	Socorro	LINEAR	T_{j} (2.98) · EUP	6.7 km	MPC · JPL
121787	2000 AB_{91}	—	January 5, 2000	Socorro	LINEAR	·	2.8 km	MPC · JPL
121788	2000 AN_{101}	—	January 5, 2000	Socorro	LINEAR	·	6.9 km	MPC · JPL
121789	2000 AE_{103}	—	January 5, 2000	Socorro	LINEAR	·	6.6 km	MPC · JPL
121790	2000 AS_{104}	—	January 5, 2000	Socorro	LINEAR	·	5.4 km	MPC · JPL
121791	2000 AS_{115}	—	January 5, 2000	Socorro	LINEAR	·	8.3 km	MPC · JPL
121792	2000 AY_{118}	—	January 5, 2000	Socorro	LINEAR	·	1.9 km	MPC · JPL
121793	2000 AT_{119}	—	January 5, 2000	Socorro	LINEAR	·	6.9 km	MPC · JPL
121794	2000 AD_{124}	—	January 5, 2000	Socorro	LINEAR	·	7.1 km	MPC · JPL
121795	2000 AR_{125}	—	January 5, 2000	Socorro	LINEAR	·	7.4 km	MPC · JPL
121796	2000 AQ_{132}	—	January 3, 2000	Socorro	LINEAR	TIR	4.6 km	MPC · JPL
121797	2000 AQ_{150}	—	January 8, 2000	Socorro	LINEAR	·	6.6 km	MPC · JPL
121798	2000 AS_{158}	—	January 3, 2000	Socorro	LINEAR	VER	5.6 km	MPC · JPL
121799	2000 AB_{159}	—	January 3, 2000	Socorro	LINEAR	·	5.1 km	MPC · JPL
121800	2000 AQ_{160}	—	January 3, 2000	Socorro	LINEAR	·	6.9 km	MPC · JPL

== 121801–121900 ==
back to top

Designation			Discovery			Properties		Ref
Permanent	Provisional	Named after	Date	Site	Discoverer(s)	Category	Diam.	Ref
121801	2000 AO_{161}	—	January 3, 2000	Socorro	LINEAR	·	5.1 km	MPC · JPL
121802	2000 AP_{162}	—	January 4, 2000	Socorro	LINEAR	·	1.8 km	MPC · JPL
121803	2000 AC_{167}	—	January 8, 2000	Socorro	LINEAR	·	6.4 km	MPC · JPL
121804	2000 AK_{168}	—	January 13, 2000	Kleť	Kleť	·	4.4 km	MPC · JPL
121805	2000 AS_{168}	—	January 12, 2000	Prescott	P. G. Comba	·	1.5 km	MPC · JPL
121806	2000 AH_{187}	—	January 8, 2000	Socorro	LINEAR	·	7.0 km	MPC · JPL
121807	2000 AW_{187}	—	January 8, 2000	Socorro	LINEAR	THB	5.8 km	MPC · JPL
121808	2000 AN_{189}	—	January 8, 2000	Socorro	LINEAR	AEG	7.7 km	MPC · JPL
121809	2000 AA_{194}	—	January 8, 2000	Socorro	LINEAR	·	5.9 km	MPC · JPL
121810	2000 AU_{214}	—	January 7, 2000	Kitt Peak	Spacewatch	EMA	9.7 km	MPC · JPL
121811	2000 AD_{217}	—	January 8, 2000	Kitt Peak	Spacewatch	·	1.2 km	MPC · JPL
121812	2000 AP_{222}	—	January 9, 2000	Kitt Peak	Spacewatch	·	7.5 km	MPC · JPL
121813	2000 AW_{226}	—	January 9, 2000	Kitt Peak	Spacewatch	·	4.9 km	MPC · JPL
121814	2000 AM_{231}	—	January 4, 2000	Socorro	LINEAR	·	7.0 km	MPC · JPL
121815	2000 AE_{232}	—	January 4, 2000	Socorro	LINEAR	·	4.5 km	MPC · JPL
121816	2000 AE_{238}	—	January 6, 2000	Socorro	LINEAR	·	6.0 km	MPC · JPL
121817 Szatmáry	2000 AP_{246}	Szatmáry	January 2, 2000	Piszkéstető	K. Sárneczky, L. Kiss	·	5.4 km	MPC · JPL
121818	2000 AB_{247}	—	January 2, 2000	Kitt Peak	Spacewatch	H	840 m	MPC · JPL
121819	2000 AH_{247}	—	January 2, 2000	Socorro	LINEAR	·	4.7 km	MPC · JPL
121820	2000 AE_{249}	—	January 3, 2000	Socorro	LINEAR	THM	3.9 km	MPC · JPL
121821	2000 AL_{251}	—	January 5, 2000	Socorro	LINEAR	KOR	2.9 km	MPC · JPL
121822	2000 BT	—	January 26, 2000	Farra d'Isonzo	Farra d'Isonzo	·	8.1 km	MPC · JPL
121823	2000 BA_{1}	—	January 28, 2000	Socorro	LINEAR	H	1.4 km	MPC · JPL
121824	2000 BU_{9}	—	January 26, 2000	Kitt Peak	Spacewatch	CYB	5.6 km	MPC · JPL
121825	2000 BV_{9}	—	January 26, 2000	Kitt Peak	Spacewatch	·	1.1 km	MPC · JPL
121826	2000 BA_{10}	—	January 26, 2000	Kitt Peak	Spacewatch	·	4.4 km	MPC · JPL
121827	2000 BG_{12}	—	January 28, 2000	Kitt Peak	Spacewatch	·	5.2 km	MPC · JPL
121828	2000 BH_{13}	—	January 29, 2000	Kitt Peak	Spacewatch	THM	4.4 km	MPC · JPL
121829	2000 BU_{15}	—	January 29, 2000	Socorro	LINEAR	·	1.5 km	MPC · JPL
121830	2000 BG_{20}	—	January 26, 2000	Kitt Peak	Spacewatch	THM	4.1 km	MPC · JPL
121831	2000 BV_{20}	—	January 28, 2000	Kitt Peak	Spacewatch	LUT	7.8 km	MPC · JPL
121832	2000 BZ_{21}	—	January 29, 2000	Kitt Peak	Spacewatch	THM	5.1 km	MPC · JPL
121833	2000 BO_{23}	—	January 27, 2000	Socorro	LINEAR	·	4.8 km	MPC · JPL
121834	2000 BZ_{24}	—	January 30, 2000	Socorro	LINEAR	·	6.9 km	MPC · JPL
121835	2000 BD_{25}	—	January 30, 2000	Socorro	LINEAR	·	4.3 km	MPC · JPL
121836	2000 BZ_{26}	—	January 30, 2000	Socorro	LINEAR	·	5.4 km	MPC · JPL
121837	2000 BT_{27}	—	January 30, 2000	Socorro	LINEAR	·	1.6 km	MPC · JPL
121838	2000 BX_{37}	—	January 28, 2000	Kitt Peak	Spacewatch	·	5.9 km	MPC · JPL
121839	2000 BS_{41}	—	January 30, 2000	Kitt Peak	Spacewatch	EOS	4.1 km	MPC · JPL
121840	2000 BS_{44}	—	January 28, 2000	Kitt Peak	Spacewatch	·	4.7 km	MPC · JPL
121841	2000 BX_{49}	—	January 16, 2000	Kitt Peak	Spacewatch	·	5.4 km	MPC · JPL
121842	2000 CD_{6}	—	February 2, 2000	Socorro	LINEAR	H	1.3 km	MPC · JPL
121843	2000 CQ_{6}	—	February 2, 2000	Socorro	LINEAR	·	7.0 km	MPC · JPL
121844	2000 CQ_{9}	—	February 2, 2000	Socorro	LINEAR	HYG	5.2 km	MPC · JPL
121845	2000 CS_{9}	—	February 2, 2000	Socorro	LINEAR	·	4.3 km	MPC · JPL
121846	2000 CJ_{14}	—	February 2, 2000	Socorro	LINEAR	·	1.5 km	MPC · JPL
121847	2000 CS_{22}	—	February 2, 2000	Socorro	LINEAR	·	7.2 km	MPC · JPL
121848	2000 CN_{23}	—	February 2, 2000	Socorro	LINEAR	·	2.2 km	MPC · JPL
121849	2000 CB_{24}	—	February 2, 2000	Socorro	LINEAR	·	5.6 km	MPC · JPL
121850	2000 CA_{28}	—	February 2, 2000	Socorro	LINEAR	·	2.2 km	MPC · JPL
121851	2000 CO_{31}	—	February 2, 2000	Socorro	LINEAR	·	1.7 km	MPC · JPL
121852	2000 CU_{31}	—	February 2, 2000	Socorro	LINEAR	·	7.3 km	MPC · JPL
121853	2000 CT_{34}	—	February 3, 2000	Tebbutt	F. B. Zoltowski	·	6.0 km	MPC · JPL
121854	2000 CE_{44}	—	February 2, 2000	Socorro	LINEAR	·	6.5 km	MPC · JPL
121855	2000 CX_{52}	—	February 2, 2000	Socorro	LINEAR	·	2.1 km	MPC · JPL
121856	2000 CX_{54}	—	February 3, 2000	Socorro	LINEAR	·	5.9 km	MPC · JPL
121857	2000 CO_{64}	—	February 3, 2000	Socorro	LINEAR	·	5.9 km	MPC · JPL
121858	2000 CV_{64}	—	February 3, 2000	Socorro	LINEAR	·	5.5 km	MPC · JPL
121859	2000 CG_{66}	—	February 6, 2000	Socorro	LINEAR	·	5.6 km	MPC · JPL
121860	2000 CK_{66}	—	February 6, 2000	Socorro	LINEAR	·	1.7 km	MPC · JPL
121861	2000 CW_{69}	—	February 1, 2000	Kitt Peak	Spacewatch	·	4.2 km	MPC · JPL
121862	2000 CT_{72}	—	February 2, 2000	Socorro	LINEAR	EOS	3.8 km	MPC · JPL
121863	2000 CO_{75}	—	February 6, 2000	Socorro	LINEAR	·	1.5 km	MPC · JPL
121864	2000 CK_{76}	—	February 9, 2000	Višnjan Observatory	K. Korlević	·	4.2 km	MPC · JPL
121865 Dauvergne	2000 CT_{80}	Dauvergne	February 10, 2000	La Silla	Colas, F., Cavadore, C.	ERI	3.1 km	MPC · JPL
121866	2000 CE_{83}	—	February 4, 2000	Socorro	LINEAR	·	5.3 km	MPC · JPL
121867	2000 CB_{86}	—	February 4, 2000	Socorro	LINEAR	·	2.3 km	MPC · JPL
121868	2000 CQ_{90}	—	February 6, 2000	Socorro	LINEAR	·	1.5 km	MPC · JPL
121869	2000 CF_{91}	—	February 6, 2000	Socorro	LINEAR	·	5.5 km	MPC · JPL
121870	2000 CB_{98}	—	February 7, 2000	Kitt Peak	Spacewatch	·	5.3 km	MPC · JPL
121871	2000 CH_{99}	—	February 8, 2000	Kitt Peak	Spacewatch	THM	3.4 km	MPC · JPL
121872	2000 CE_{100}	—	February 10, 2000	Kitt Peak	Spacewatch	·	6.4 km	MPC · JPL
121873	2000 CA_{101}	—	February 12, 2000	Kitt Peak	Spacewatch	THM	3.8 km	MPC · JPL
121874	2000 CJ_{116}	—	February 3, 2000	Socorro	LINEAR	·	1.2 km	MPC · JPL
121875	2000 CQ_{116}	—	February 3, 2000	Socorro	LINEAR	·	6.8 km	MPC · JPL
121876	2000 CT_{117}	—	February 2, 2000	Socorro	LINEAR	·	6.3 km	MPC · JPL
121877	2000 CG_{120}	—	February 2, 2000	Socorro	LINEAR	·	1.7 km	MPC · JPL
121878	2000 CG_{122}	—	February 3, 2000	Socorro	LINEAR	THM	4.7 km	MPC · JPL
121879	2000 CF_{132}	—	February 3, 2000	Kitt Peak	Spacewatch	NYS	2.0 km	MPC · JPL
121880	2000 CV_{134}	—	February 4, 2000	Kitt Peak	Spacewatch	·	1.4 km	MPC · JPL
121881	2000 DC_{1}	—	February 25, 2000	Socorro	LINEAR	·	7.7 km	MPC · JPL
121882	2000 DW_{1}	—	February 26, 2000	Kitt Peak	Spacewatch	·	1.5 km	MPC · JPL
121883	2000 DA_{2}	—	February 26, 2000	Kitt Peak	Spacewatch	·	5.4 km	MPC · JPL
121884	2000 DA_{3}	—	February 27, 2000	Oizumi	T. Kobayashi	·	5.0 km	MPC · JPL
121885	2000 DQ_{6}	—	February 28, 2000	Socorro	LINEAR	CYB	7.9 km	MPC · JPL
121886	2000 DF_{10}	—	February 26, 2000	Kitt Peak	Spacewatch	·	1.4 km	MPC · JPL
121887	2000 DY_{11}	—	February 27, 2000	Kitt Peak	Spacewatch	·	1.0 km	MPC · JPL
121888	2000 DN_{12}	—	February 27, 2000	Kitt Peak	Spacewatch	·	970 m	MPC · JPL
121889	2000 DL_{17}	—	February 29, 2000	Socorro	LINEAR	·	1.7 km	MPC · JPL
121890	2000 DK_{21}	—	February 29, 2000	Socorro	LINEAR	·	7.8 km	MPC · JPL
121891	2000 DP_{21}	—	February 29, 2000	Socorro	LINEAR	VER	5.8 km	MPC · JPL
121892	2000 DC_{25}	—	February 29, 2000	Socorro	LINEAR	·	1.3 km	MPC · JPL
121893	2000 DM_{25}	—	February 29, 2000	Socorro	LINEAR	·	7.8 km	MPC · JPL
121894	2000 DC_{28}	—	February 29, 2000	Socorro	LINEAR	·	5.1 km	MPC · JPL
121895	2000 DJ_{29}	—	February 29, 2000	Socorro	LINEAR	·	7.6 km	MPC · JPL
121896	2000 DW_{33}	—	February 29, 2000	Socorro	LINEAR	·	1.5 km	MPC · JPL
121897	2000 DZ_{34}	—	February 29, 2000	Socorro	LINEAR	MAS	1.4 km	MPC · JPL
121898	2000 DG_{35}	—	February 29, 2000	Socorro	LINEAR	(1338) (FLO)	1.2 km	MPC · JPL
121899	2000 DM_{36}	—	February 29, 2000	Socorro	LINEAR	·	5.3 km	MPC · JPL
121900	2000 DU_{37}	—	February 29, 2000	Socorro	LINEAR	THM	4.1 km	MPC · JPL

== 121901–122000 ==
back to top

Designation			Discovery			Properties		Ref
Permanent	Provisional	Named after	Date	Site	Discoverer(s)	Category	Diam.	Ref
121901	2000 DT_{44}	—	February 29, 2000	Socorro	LINEAR	SYL · CYB	8.7 km	MPC · JPL
121902	2000 DV_{44}	—	February 29, 2000	Socorro	LINEAR	·	2.4 km	MPC · JPL
121903	2000 DZ_{50}	—	February 29, 2000	Socorro	LINEAR	·	1.3 km	MPC · JPL
121904	2000 DS_{51}	—	February 29, 2000	Socorro	LINEAR	THM	6.3 km	MPC · JPL
121905	2000 DE_{56}	—	February 29, 2000	Socorro	LINEAR	·	1.4 km	MPC · JPL
121906	2000 DB_{62}	—	February 29, 2000	Socorro	LINEAR	·	4.6 km	MPC · JPL
121907	2000 DX_{64}	—	February 29, 2000	Socorro	LINEAR	THM	4.8 km	MPC · JPL
121908	2000 DD_{65}	—	February 29, 2000	Socorro	LINEAR	·	6.3 km	MPC · JPL
121909	2000 DR_{65}	—	February 29, 2000	Socorro	LINEAR	·	1.4 km	MPC · JPL
121910	2000 DW_{66}	—	February 29, 2000	Socorro	LINEAR	·	1.5 km	MPC · JPL
121911	2000 DG_{67}	—	February 29, 2000	Socorro	LINEAR	·	5.1 km	MPC · JPL
121912	2000 DZ_{67}	—	February 29, 2000	Socorro	LINEAR	NYS	1.7 km	MPC · JPL
121913	2000 DN_{68}	—	February 29, 2000	Socorro	LINEAR	·	1.4 km	MPC · JPL
121914	2000 DB_{69}	—	February 29, 2000	Socorro	LINEAR	·	6.8 km	MPC · JPL
121915	2000 DN_{73}	—	February 29, 2000	Socorro	LINEAR	(2076)	2.0 km	MPC · JPL
121916	2000 DW_{76}	—	February 29, 2000	Socorro	LINEAR	·	2.1 km	MPC · JPL
121917	2000 DL_{83}	—	February 28, 2000	Socorro	LINEAR	·	6.0 km	MPC · JPL
121918	2000 DN_{83}	—	February 28, 2000	Socorro	LINEAR	·	7.2 km	MPC · JPL
121919	2000 DN_{84}	—	February 29, 2000	Socorro	LINEAR	VER	5.7 km	MPC · JPL
121920	2000 DP_{88}	—	February 29, 2000	Socorro	LINEAR	·	1.1 km	MPC · JPL
121921	2000 DA_{89}	—	February 26, 2000	Kitt Peak	Spacewatch	·	2.2 km	MPC · JPL
121922	2000 DT_{91}	—	February 27, 2000	Kitt Peak	Spacewatch	·	1.2 km	MPC · JPL
121923	2000 DZ_{96}	—	February 29, 2000	Socorro	LINEAR	HYG	7.1 km	MPC · JPL
121924	2000 DH_{98}	—	February 29, 2000	Socorro	LINEAR	·	1.3 km	MPC · JPL
121925	2000 DX_{98}	—	February 29, 2000	Socorro	LINEAR	·	6.8 km	MPC · JPL
121926	2000 DO_{103}	—	February 29, 2000	Socorro	LINEAR	·	6.8 km	MPC · JPL
121927	2000 DX_{103}	—	February 29, 2000	Socorro	LINEAR	·	1.6 km	MPC · JPL
121928	2000 DV_{104}	—	February 29, 2000	Socorro	LINEAR	·	1.4 km	MPC · JPL
121929	2000 DB_{105}	—	February 29, 2000	Socorro	LINEAR	·	980 m	MPC · JPL
121930	2000 DW_{105}	—	February 29, 2000	Socorro	LINEAR	·	1.8 km	MPC · JPL
121931	2000 DY_{114}	—	February 27, 2000	Kitt Peak	Spacewatch	·	1.6 km	MPC · JPL
121932	2000 DW_{117}	—	February 25, 2000	Kitt Peak	Spacewatch	·	1.2 km	MPC · JPL
121933	2000 EG_{1}	—	March 3, 2000	Socorro	LINEAR	HYG	6.3 km	MPC · JPL
121934	2000 EP_{3}	—	March 3, 2000	Socorro	LINEAR	·	5.8 km	MPC · JPL
121935	2000 EN_{4}	—	March 2, 2000	Kitt Peak	Spacewatch	·	4.6 km	MPC · JPL
121936	2000 ER_{6}	—	March 2, 2000	Kitt Peak	Spacewatch	·	1.5 km	MPC · JPL
121937	2000 EP_{9}	—	March 3, 2000	Socorro	LINEAR	·	1.5 km	MPC · JPL
121938	2000 EX_{11}	—	March 4, 2000	Socorro	LINEAR	·	1.9 km	MPC · JPL
121939	2000 EE_{13}	—	March 4, 2000	Socorro	LINEAR	·	9.8 km	MPC · JPL
121940	2000 EW_{16}	—	March 3, 2000	Socorro	LINEAR	NYS	2.3 km	MPC · JPL
121941	2000 ER_{18}	—	March 5, 2000	Socorro	LINEAR	THM	4.8 km	MPC · JPL
121942	2000 ES_{23}	—	March 8, 2000	Kitt Peak	Spacewatch	·	2.3 km	MPC · JPL
121943	2000 EV_{27}	—	March 4, 2000	Socorro	LINEAR	CYB	6.4 km	MPC · JPL
121944	2000 EJ_{28}	—	March 4, 2000	Socorro	LINEAR	·	1.4 km	MPC · JPL
121945	2000 EK_{31}	—	March 5, 2000	Socorro	LINEAR	·	4.1 km	MPC · JPL
121946	2000 EO_{31}	—	March 5, 2000	Socorro	LINEAR	·	6.8 km	MPC · JPL
121947	2000 EC_{36}	—	March 3, 2000	Socorro	LINEAR	·	2.4 km	MPC · JPL
121948	2000 EH_{37}	—	March 8, 2000	Socorro	LINEAR	·	2.3 km	MPC · JPL
121949	2000 ET_{42}	—	March 8, 2000	Socorro	LINEAR	·	1.4 km	MPC · JPL
121950	2000 EA_{43}	—	March 8, 2000	Socorro	LINEAR	·	2.4 km	MPC · JPL
121951	2000 ES_{45}	—	March 9, 2000	Socorro	LINEAR	·	2.9 km	MPC · JPL
121952	2000 EX_{48}	—	March 9, 2000	Socorro	LINEAR	NYS	3.4 km	MPC · JPL
121953	2000 EP_{50}	—	March 10, 2000	Prescott	P. G. Comba	·	1.8 km	MPC · JPL
121954	2000 EQ_{50}	—	March 10, 2000	Prescott	P. G. Comba	·	1.3 km	MPC · JPL
121955	2000 ED_{53}	—	March 4, 2000	Kitt Peak	Spacewatch	·	6.0 km	MPC · JPL
121956	2000 EH_{54}	—	March 9, 2000	Kitt Peak	Spacewatch	·	1.3 km	MPC · JPL
121957	2000 EX_{54}	—	March 10, 2000	Kitt Peak	Spacewatch	·	2.3 km	MPC · JPL
121958	2000 EP_{58}	—	March 8, 2000	Socorro	LINEAR	NYS	2.7 km	MPC · JPL
121959	2000 EL_{67}	—	March 10, 2000	Socorro	LINEAR	·	2.7 km	MPC · JPL
121960	2000 EN_{68}	—	March 10, 2000	Socorro	LINEAR	·	1.8 km	MPC · JPL
121961	2000 EZ_{79}	—	March 5, 2000	Socorro	LINEAR	·	1.9 km	MPC · JPL
121962	2000 EJ_{81}	—	March 5, 2000	Socorro	LINEAR	·	1.8 km	MPC · JPL
121963	2000 EF_{87}	—	March 8, 2000	Socorro	LINEAR	·	2.3 km	MPC · JPL
121964	2000 EC_{99}	—	March 11, 2000	Kitt Peak	Spacewatch	·	5.7 km	MPC · JPL
121965	2000 EF_{99}	—	March 12, 2000	Kitt Peak	Spacewatch	·	1.5 km	MPC · JPL
121966	2000 EC_{103}	—	March 11, 2000	Socorro	LINEAR	·	3.9 km	MPC · JPL
121967	2000 EP_{108}	—	March 8, 2000	Haleakala	NEAT	·	1.6 km	MPC · JPL
121968	2000 EU_{108}	—	March 8, 2000	Kitt Peak	Spacewatch	EOS	3.9 km	MPC · JPL
121969	2000 ES_{110}	—	March 8, 2000	Haleakala	NEAT	V	1.2 km	MPC · JPL
121970	2000 EK_{112}	—	March 9, 2000	Kitt Peak	Spacewatch	THM	4.3 km	MPC · JPL
121971	2000 EF_{113}	—	March 9, 2000	Socorro	LINEAR	(2076)	2.1 km	MPC · JPL
121972	2000 ES_{117}	—	March 11, 2000	Anderson Mesa	LONEOS	·	7.4 km	MPC · JPL
121973	2000 EW_{118}	—	March 11, 2000	Anderson Mesa	LONEOS	·	1.6 km	MPC · JPL
121974	2000 ED_{119}	—	March 11, 2000	Anderson Mesa	LONEOS	·	5.6 km	MPC · JPL
121975	2000 EA_{126}	—	March 11, 2000	Anderson Mesa	LONEOS	·	4.4 km	MPC · JPL
121976	2000 EH_{129}	—	March 11, 2000	Anderson Mesa	LONEOS	NYS	1.6 km	MPC · JPL
121977	2000 EK_{135}	—	March 11, 2000	Anderson Mesa	LONEOS	·	3.3 km	MPC · JPL
121978	2000 ED_{140}	—	March 8, 2000	Mauna Kea	Whiteley, R. J.	H	1.1 km	MPC · JPL
121979	2000 EM_{149}	—	March 5, 2000	Socorro	LINEAR	·	1.4 km	MPC · JPL
121980	2000 ET_{156}	—	March 10, 2000	Socorro	LINEAR	·	2.8 km	MPC · JPL
121981	2000 EH_{159}	—	March 3, 2000	Socorro	LINEAR	VER	6.5 km	MPC · JPL
121982	2000 EP_{160}	—	March 3, 2000	Socorro	LINEAR	THM	4.3 km	MPC · JPL
121983	2000 EN_{164}	—	March 3, 2000	Socorro	LINEAR	·	1.3 km	MPC · JPL
121984	2000 ED_{167}	—	March 4, 2000	Socorro	LINEAR	·	1.3 km	MPC · JPL
121985	2000 EP_{172}	—	March 10, 2000	Kitt Peak	Spacewatch	NYS	3.1 km	MPC · JPL
121986	2000 ER_{180}	—	March 4, 2000	Socorro	LINEAR	fast	2.0 km	MPC · JPL
121987	2000 EU_{188}	—	March 3, 2000	Socorro	LINEAR	·	2.5 km	MPC · JPL
121988	2000 FW_{8}	—	March 29, 2000	Kitt Peak	Spacewatch	·	3.3 km	MPC · JPL
121989	2000 FV_{9}	—	March 30, 2000	Kitt Peak	Spacewatch	V	1.3 km	MPC · JPL
121990	2000 FX_{11}	—	March 28, 2000	Socorro	LINEAR	·	11 km	MPC · JPL
121991	2000 FC_{17}	—	March 28, 2000	Socorro	LINEAR	·	1.4 km	MPC · JPL
121992	2000 FS_{20}	—	March 29, 2000	Socorro	LINEAR	V	1.6 km	MPC · JPL
121993	2000 FX_{27}	—	March 27, 2000	Anderson Mesa	LONEOS	·	1.6 km	MPC · JPL
121994	2000 FV_{28}	—	March 27, 2000	Anderson Mesa	LONEOS	·	1.1 km	MPC · JPL
121995	2000 FO_{38}	—	March 29, 2000	Socorro	LINEAR	NYS	2.3 km	MPC · JPL
121996	2000 FV_{41}	—	March 29, 2000	Socorro	LINEAR	·	1.5 km	MPC · JPL
121997	2000 FX_{41}	—	March 29, 2000	Socorro	LINEAR	·	3.2 km	MPC · JPL
121998	2000 FS_{43}	—	March 29, 2000	Socorro	LINEAR	·	1.3 km	MPC · JPL
121999	2000 FM_{44}	—	March 29, 2000	Socorro	LINEAR	·	1.8 km	MPC · JPL
122000	2000 FR_{45}	—	March 29, 2000	Socorro	LINEAR	·	2.1 km	MPC · JPL

back to top

== See also ==
- Meanings of minor-planet names: 121001–122000
