= Simeon Jakovlevič =

Czech Orthodox bishop (1926–2024)

His Eminence Simeon
- Archbishop of Brno and Olomouc
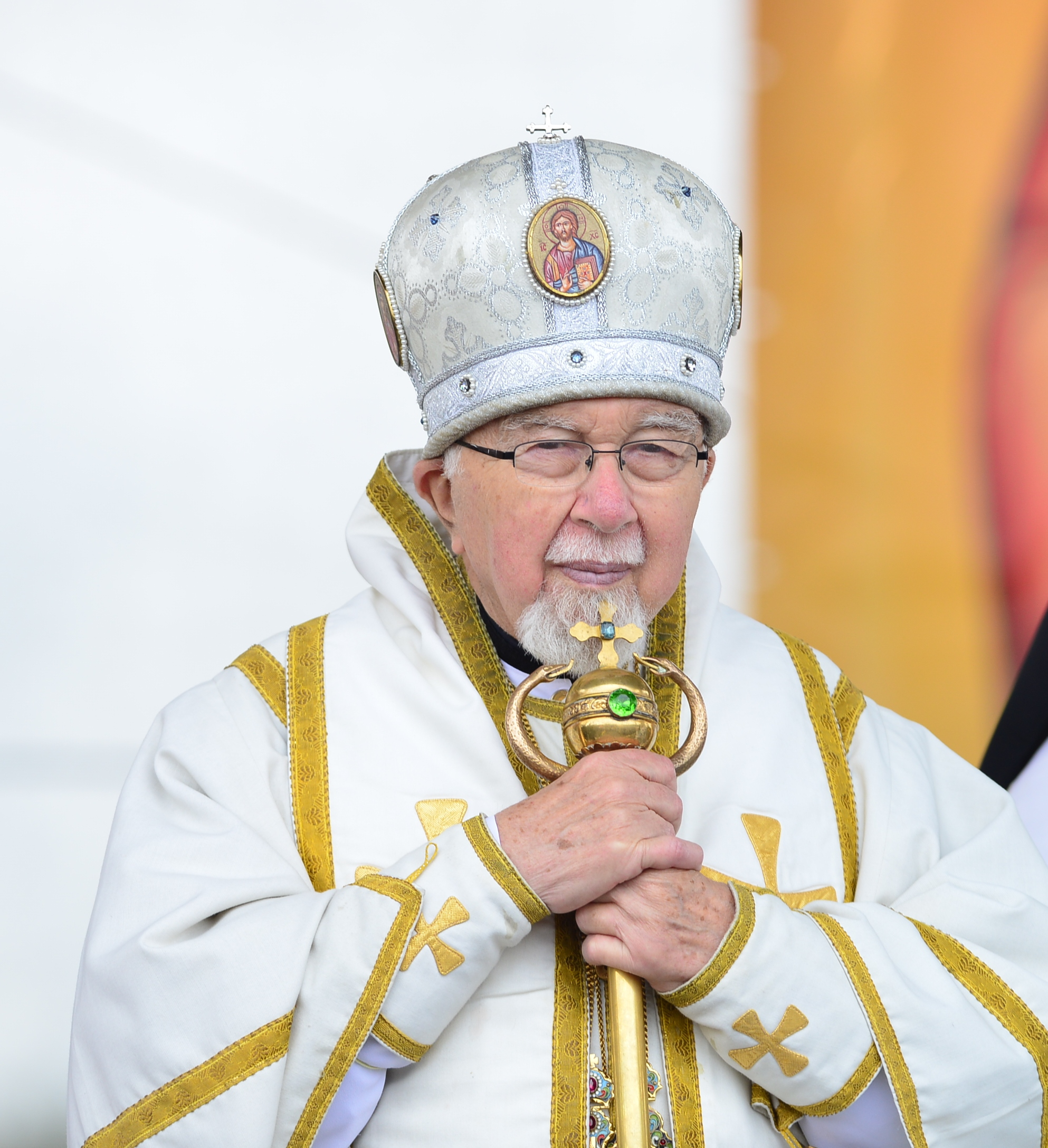
- Church: Czech and Slovak Orthodox Church
- Archdiocese: Diocese of Brno and Olomouc
- Predecessor: Christopher Pulec
- Successor: Izaiáš Slaninka

Personal details
- Born: Radivoj Jakovlevič; 12 February 1926 Prague, Czechoslovakia
- Died: 19 March 2024 (aged 98)
- Denomination: Eastern Orthodox

Archbishop Simeon (secular name Radivoj Jakovlevič; 12 February 1926 – 19 March 2024) was an Eastern Orthodox bishop.

== Biography ==
Simeon studied theology in Prague, Belgrade, and Leningrad. He taught in theological faculties, especially regarding the Old Testament. In 1958, he was ordained a deacon and a priest. On 21 June 1998, he received his episcopal consecration in Saints Cyril and Methodius Cathedral. On 9 April 2000, he was appointed the bishop of Brno and Olomouc. On 12 February 2006, he was elevated to the rank of Archbishop.

On 12 April 2013, after the resignation of Metropolitan Christopher, Simeon temporarily became the Locum Tenens (ad interim administrator) of the Czech and Slovak Orthodox Church, as the eldest bishop of the Church, until a new metropolitan could be elected. As a result of the intra-church conflict, his position became controversial.

On 9 December 2013, he was relieved of his position as Locum Tenens, and replaced by Metropolitan Rastislav. On 11 January 2014, Rastislav was elected as the new primate of the Czech and Slovak Orthodox Church, which was recognized by some Eastern Orthodox churches including the Russian Orthodox Church. However, the Ecumenical Patriarchate of Constantinople still considers the position as vacant, and – until his death – still considered Simeon as the current Locum Tenens.

In early March 2014, negotiations were held in the patriarchal residence of Constantinople in Phanar between Archbishop Simeon, Archbishop Rastislav, Bishops George and Joachim, but the dialogue was unsuccessful.

Archbishop Simeon died on 19 March 2024, at the age of 98.
