= August 22 (Eastern Orthodox liturgics) =

Day in the Eastern Orthodox liturgical calendar

Eastern Orthodox liturgical calendar
August 21	August 22	August 23
August 22 O.S. ≍ September 4 N.S. August 22 N.S ≍ August 9 O.S.

An Eastern Orthodox cross

August 22 in Eastern Orthodox liturgical calendars is a feast day and a day of commemoration of saints and martyrs. Although some Orthodox churches use the Revised Julian Calendar and others use the traditional Julian calendar, the fixed commemorations for their respective August 22 are broadly the same, no matter which calendar is used. (Note: Despite the dates being the same, the days to which they refer typically differ by 13 days. The notation Old Style or O.S. is sometimes used to indicate a date in the traditional Julian Calendar (the "Old Calendar"). The notation New Style or N.S. indicates a date in the Revised Julian calendar (the "New Calendar").)

== Feasts ==
- Afterfeast of the Dormition. (Note: The Church continues to honor the passage of the Most Holy Theotokos from death to life. Just as Christ once dwelt in the virginal womb of His Mother, now He takes Her "to dwell in His courts.")

== Saints ==
- Martyrs Agathonicus of Nicomedia and his companions:

- Zoticus, Theoprepius (Bogolep), Acindynus, Severian, Zeno, and others, who suffered under Maximian (4th century)

- Hieromartyr Athanasius, Bishop of Tarsus in Cilicia, by beheading (c. 257)
- Saint Anthusa of Seleucia (298), and Martyrs Charesimus and Neophytus (c. 253-259)
- Martyrs Irenaeus, Or, and Oropsus. (Note: Or and Oropsus were tortured together with the priest Irenaeus. The three thrown into the fire, but a heavy rain suddenly extinguished the fire and the three witnesses were untouched by the flames. The prefect then gave the decree to behead them.)
- Martyr Julian of Heliopolis in Syria (c. 362)
- Saint Ariadne (515), daughter of Emperor Leo I. (Note: Her memory is preserved in the Synaxarion of Delahaye, as well as in Codex Oxon (Codex Biblioth. Bodleianae Oxon) t. III 16, and in Parisian Codex 1617.)

== Pre-Schism Western saints ==
- Saint Antoninus of Rome, a converted executioner in Rome (186) (Note: "At Rome, St. Antoninus, martyr, who, openly declaring himself a Christian, was condemned to capital punishment by the judge Vitellius, and buried on the Aurelian road.")
- Saint Symphorian of Autun, martyred for refusing to sacrifice to a pagan goddess (2nd century) (Note: A member of a senatorial family in Autun in France, he was martyred under Marcus Aurelius for refusing to sacrifice to a pagan goddess.) (Note: "At Autun, St. Symphorian, a martyr, in the time of the emperor Aurelian. Refusing to offer sacrifice to the idols, he was first scourged, then confined in prison, and finally ended his martyrdom by being beheaded.")
- Saint Hippolytus of Porto, Bishop of Porto in Italy, martyred by drowning under Alexander (236) (Note: "At Porto, St. Hippolytus, bishop, most renowned for learning. Having gloriously confessed the faith, in the time of the emperor Alexander, he was bound hand and foot, precipitated into a deep ditch filled with water, and thus received the palm of martyrdom. His body was buried by the Christians at that place.")
- Hieromartyr Maurus, and Companions, a group of fifty martyrs in Rheims in France (260)
- Saints Fabrician and Philibert, martyrs in Toledo, Spain.
- Saints Martial, Saturninus, Epictetus, Maprilis, Felix and Companions, martyrs with St. Aurea of Ostia, honoured in Ostia, Italy (c. 300)
- Virgin Martyr Eulalia of Barcelona (303) (see also: December 10)
- Saint Timothy, a martyr in Rome under Diocletian (c. 306) (Note: His relics were enshrined in a chapel near the church of St Paul-outside-the-Walls and venerated there.) (Note: "At Rome, on the Ostian road, the birthday of the holy martyr Timothy. After he had been arrested by Tarquinius, prefect of the city, and kept for a long time in prison, as he refused to sacrifice to the idols, he was scourged three times, subjected to the most severe torments, and finally beheaded.")
- Saint Gunifort, a pilgrim, perhaps from England, who was martyred in Pavia in Italy.
- Saint Sigfrid, Abbot of Wearmouth (c. 688) (Note: A monk and disciple of St Benedict Biscop, he became Abbot of Wearmouth in England in 686. He was an example of monastic virtue.)
- Saint Ethelgitha, Abbess of a convent in Northumbria (c. 720)
- Saint Andrew of Tuscany (c. 880) (Note: Born in Ireland, he went to Rome as a pilgrim and settled in Fiesole in Italy and restored the monastery of San Martino in Mensula.)
- Saint Arnulf of Eynesbury, saintly hermit, whose relics were venerated in Arnulphsbury or Eynesbury in Cambridgeshire, England (9th century) (Note: "ST. ARNULPH is said to have been greatly venerated, and the place of his sepulture to have been the centre of many miracles, before the devastation of the district by the Danes. We have, however, but very scanty information about his life. He is generally supposed to have been of British origin, and to have led a solitary and very austere life, on the borders of Huntingdonshire and Bedfordshire. On the same day, the 22nd August, an ancient French calendar commemorates St. Arnulph, Bishop, which has induced some writers to conjecture that the Saint of Arnulphsbury, or Eynebury, is the same as the French prelate, whose relics may have been translated to England.")

== Post-Schism Orthodox saints ==
- Saint Bogolep of St. Paisius of Uglich Monastery (16th century)
- Venerable Isaac I (Antimonov, the "Elder"), Schema-Archimandrite of Optina Monastery (1894)

=== New martyrs and confessors ===
- Ephraim (Kuznetsov), Bishop of Selenginsk, and Priest John Vostorgov (1918)
- Macarius (Gnevushev), Bishop of Orel, and Priests John Boyarshinov and Alexis Naumov (1918) (Note: See: Макарий (Гневушев). Википедии. (Russian Wikipedia).)
- Theodore (Smirnov), Bishop of Penza, and with him Priests Basil Smirnov and Gabriel Archangelsky (1937) (Note: See: Феодор (Смирнов). Википедии. (Russian Wikipedia).)
- John (Troyansky), Bishop of Veliki Luki (1937) (Note: See: Иоанн (Троянский). Википедии. (Russian Wikipedia).)
- Alexis (Orlov), Archbishop of Omsk (1937) (Note: See: Алексий (Орлов). Википедии. (Russian Wikipedia).)
- Andrew (Ukhtomsky), Archbishop of Ufa and Menzelin (1937)
- Hierotheus (Glazkov), Hieromonk, of Lyubim (Yaroslasvl) (1937)
- John (Laba) and Hilarion (Tsurikov), Hieromonks, of Mirzoyan (Kazakhstan) (1937)
- Alexander Ratkovsky, Michael Lyubertsev and Theodore Malyarovsky, Priests (1937)
- New Hieromartyr Gorazd (Pavlík), Bishop of Prague, Bohemia and Moravo-Cilezsk, slain by Nazis (1942)

== Other commemorations ==
- Synaxis of Panagia Proussiotissa (Mother of God of Proussa) in Evrytania, Greece (c. 829–842) (Note: The Icon of Panagia Proussiotissa (Mother of God of Proussa) was re-discovered near Karpenissi in Greece, after it had been lost during its transportation in 829 AD from Asia Minor to the mainland of Greece to save it from iconoclasm, during the period of iconoclastic Byzantine Emperor Theophilos (829–842). According to holy tradition, this icon was painted by Saint Luke the Evangelist. The Monastery of Proussos in Karpenisi, Evrytania, Greece, was named after the Holy Icon of Panagia of Prousa. It was founded during this period on the site where the icon was re-discovered. Its feast day is 23 August (the Leavetaking of the Dormition of the Mother of God), and it is visited by crowds of pilgrims each year from 15 to 23 August to venerate the Icon of the All-Holy Mother of God of Prousa.)
- Georgian Icon (Iveron Icon, Iverskaya) of the Most Holy Theotokos, at the Monastery of St. Alexis of Moscow (1650) (Note: See: (in Russian) Грузинская икона Божией Матери. Википедии. (Russian Wikipedia).)

== Icon gallery ==
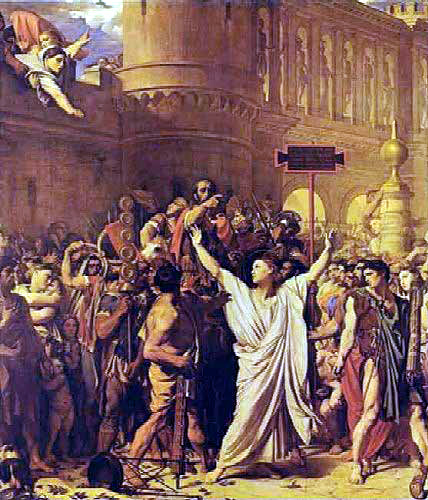
The martyrdom of Symphorian of Autun.

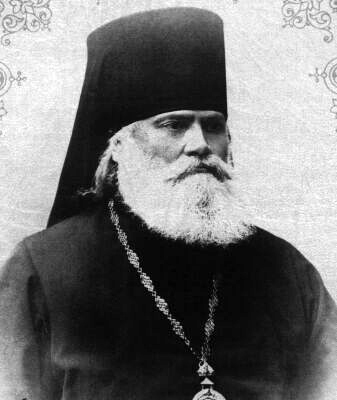
New Hieromartyr Macarius (Gnevushev), Bishop of Orel.

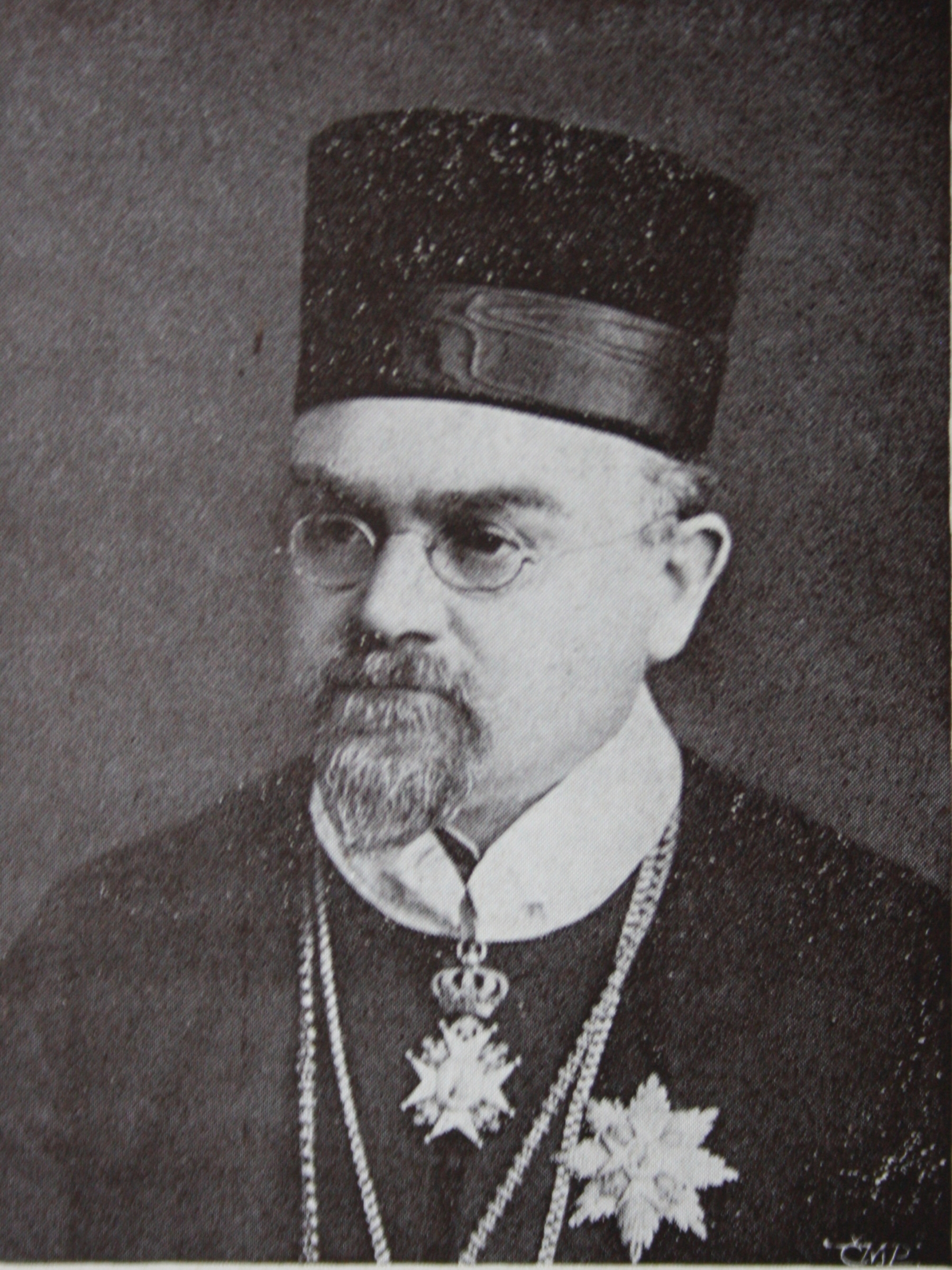
New Hieromartyr Gorazd (Pavlík), Bishop of Prague, Bohemia and Moravo-Cilezsk.

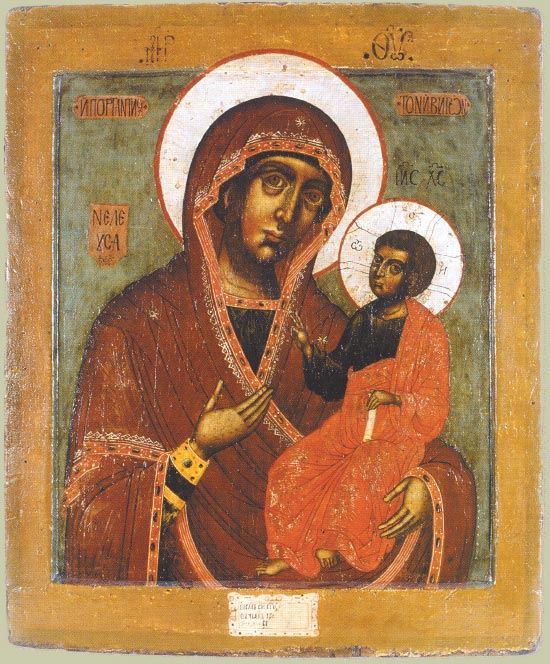
Georgian Icon of the Most Holy Theotokos (Iverskaya) (end of the 17th century).

== Sources ==
- August 22 / September 4. Orthodox Calendar (PRAVOSLAVIE.RU).
- September 4 / August 22. Holy Trinity Russian Orthodox Church (A parish of the Patriarchate of Moscow).
- August 22. OCA - The Lives of the Saints.
- The Autonomous Orthodox Metropolia of Western Europe and the Americas (ROCOR). St. Hilarion Calendar of Saints for the year of our Lord 2004. St. Hilarion Press (Austin, TX). p. 62.
- Menologion: The Twenty-Second Day of the Month of August. Orthodoxy in China.
- August 22. Latin Saints of the Orthodox Patriarchate of Rome.
- The Roman Martyrology. Transl. by the Archbishop of Baltimore. Last Edition, According to the Copy Printed at Rome in 1914. Revised Edition, with the Imprimatur of His Eminence Cardinal Gibbons. Baltimore: John Murphy Company, 1916. pp. 252–253.
- Rev. Richard Stanton. A Menology of England and Wales, or, Brief Memorials of the Ancient British and English Saints Arranged According to the Calendar, Together with the Martyrs of the 16th and 17th Centuries. London: Burns & Oates, 1892. pp. 404–410.

Greek Sources

- Great Synaxaristes: (in Greek) 22 ΑΥΓΟΥΣΤΟΥ. ΜΕΓΑΣ ΣΥΝΑΞΑΡΙΣΤΗΣ.
- (in Greek) Συναξαριστής. 22 Αυγούστου. ECCLESIA.GR. (H ΕΚΚΛΗΣΙΑ ΤΗΣ ΕΛΛΑΔΟΣ).

Russian Sources

- (in Russian) 4 сентября (22 августа). Православная Энциклопедия под редакцией Патриарха Московского и всея Руси Кирилла (электронная версия). (Orthodox Encyclopedia - Pravenc.ru).
