= Saint Arnoul =

Saint Arnoul may refer to:

- Arnulf of Metz
- Arnoul des Yvelines
- Arnoul of Cysoing
- Arnoul de Mouzon
- Arnold of Soissons

== See also ==
- Saint Arnold
- Saint Arnulf
