= Arnulf =

- Gender: masculine
- Language: Germanic

Other names
- Variant forms: Arnoul, Arnulph, Arnolf, Earnulf, Ernulf, Arnúlfr, Ærnulfr, Ǫrnólfr, Ǫrnulfr, Ærinolf, Ærnolf, Ärnulf, Annul, Annulv, Anul, Arnolv, Arnulv, Örnólfur, Ørnolvur, Örnulf, Ørnulf, Ørnulv
- Related names: Arnold

Arnulf is a masculine German given name. It is composed of the Germanic elements arn "eagle" and ulf "wolf". The -ulf, -olf suffix was an extremely frequent element in Germanic onomastics and from an early time was perceived as a mere suffix forming given names. Similarly, the suffix -wald, -ald, -old, originally from wald "rule, power" underwent semantic weakening. Therefore, the name Arnulf and Arnold were often conflated in early medieval records, as is the case with bishop Arnulf of Metz (died 640), especially as the final consonant came to be dropped (Arnoul).

The name Arnulf is attested from as early as the 5th century, as the name of the brother of Odoacer. The name is attested with some frequency in Medieval Germany throughout the 8th to 11th centuries, in the spelling variants Arnulf, Arnulph, Arnolf, occasionally also as Arenulph, Harnulf, Harnolf, Harnolph. In the 9th century, Arnulf of Carinthia was the ruler of East Francia and was crowned Holy Roman Emperor in 896.

There was an Anglo-Saxon cognate, Earnulf (Ernulf), which was assimilated to the Frankish form of the name after the Norman conquest. Arnulf of Eynesbury is an obscure 9th-century English saint, who was mostly forgotten by the 11th century, and who was perhaps just a folkloristic duplicate of the historical Arnulf of Metz. In any case, the English Arnulf would have been known as Earnulf, and his relics were venerated in Earnulfesbyrig (Eynesbury, Cambridgeshire). The name is also attested in medieval Scandinavia, as Old Norse Arnúlfr (Ærnulfr, Ǫrnólfr, Ǫrnulfr, Old Swedish Ærinolf, Ærnolf, Ärnulf). Scandinavian dialectal and regional variants of the name include Annul, Annulv, Anul, Arnolv, Arnulv, Örnólfur, Ørnolvur, Örnulf, Ørnulf, Ørnulv.

The given name Arnulf remains in use in Germany and in Norway, and to a lesser extent in Sweden.

== List of people called Arnulf ==
Medieval

- Saint Arnulf of Metz (582–640)
- Saint Arnoul of Cysoing (died 720)
- Saint Arnulf of Eynesbury (9th century)
- Arnulf of Carinthia (850–899)
- Arnulf I of Bavaria (died 937) (ruled 907–927)
- Arnulf I of Flanders (ruled 918–965)
- Arnulf II of Boulogne (died 971)
- Arnulf, Count of Holland (950–993)
- Arnulf II of Flanders (960/961–987)
- Arnulf III of Boulogne (died 990)
- Arnulf (bishop of Vic) (died 1010)
- Arnulf II (archbishop of Milan) (died 1018)
- Arnulf, (archbishop of Reims) (died 1021)
- Arnulf III of Flanders (died 1071)
- Arnulf of Milan (fl. 1080s), chronicler
- Arnulf of Soissons (died 1087), saint
- Arnulf III, Archbishop of Milan (died 1097)
- Arnulf of Chocques (died 1118), Latin Patriarch of Jerusalem
- Arnulf of Montgomery (c. 1068 – 1118/1122), Anglo-Norman aristocrat
- Ernulf (died 1124), bishop of Rochester, Kent.
- Arnulf of Lisieux (died 1184)
- Arnulf of Leuven (died 1250), medieval abbot
- Arnolfo di Cambio (c. 1240 – 1300/1310), architect
- Arnoul d'Audrehem (died 1370)

Modern

- Prince Arnulf of Bavaria (1852–1907)
- Arnulf Øverland (1889–1968), Norwegian author
- Arnulf Klett (1905–1974), German politician
- Arnulf Solvoll (1908–2001), Norwegian missionary
- Arnulf Abele (1914–2000), German officer
- Arnulf Ueland (1920–2004), American businessman and politician
- Arnulf Rainer (1929–2025), Austrian painter
- Arnulf Baring (1932–2019), German author
- Arnulf Bæk (born 1943), Norwegian handball player
- Arnulf von Arnim (born 1947), German pianist
- Arnulf Herrmann (born 1968), German composer

== See also ==
- Arnold (given name)
- Arnolfo (disambiguation)
- Arnold (disambiguation)
- Arnaud (surname)
- Françoise Arnoul (1931–2021), French actress

== Literature ==
- Förstemann, Ernst (1900). Altdeutsches Namenbuch (3rd ed.). Bonn: P. Hanstein, 118f.
