= Arnolfini =

Arnolfini may refer to:

- Arnolfini, Bristol, an international arts centre and gallery in Bristol, England
- Giovanni Arnolfini (c. 1400 – after 1452), merchant from Lucca, a city in Tuscany, Italy
- Giovanni Attilio Arnolfini (1733–1791), Italian hydrologist and writer
- Arnolfini Portrait, a 1434 oil painting on oak panel by the Early Netherlandish painter Jan van Eyck

== See also ==
- Arnolfo (disambiguation)
