= Arnaud =

Arnaud may refer to:

== People ==
- Arnaud (given name), the French form of the German given name Arnold
- Arnaud (surname), the French form of the name Arnold
- Arnauld family, a noble French family prominent in the 17th century, associated with Jansenism

== Places ==
- Arnaud, Nippes, a commune in Haiti
- Arnaud River, Quebec, Canada

== Other uses ==
- Arnaud's, a well known restaurant in New Orleans, Louisiana, U.S.

== See also ==
- Saint Arnaud (disambiguation)
- Arnauld, a list of people with the surname or given name
- Arnie (disambiguation)
- Arnold (disambiguation)
