= Arnauld =

Arnauld is a surname and a masculine given name. It may refer to:

== Surname ==
- Agnès Arnauld (1593–1672), abbess of the Abbey of Port-Royal, near Paris, and a major figure in French Jansenism
- Antoine Arnauld (1612–1694), French Catholic theologian, philosopher and mathematician
- Antoine Arnauld (lawyer) (1560–1619), French lawyer in the Parlement de Paris and a Counsellor of State under King Henry IV of France
- Antoine Arnauld (1616–1698), French memoirist
- Carol Arnauld (1961–2022), French singer and songwriter
- Céline Arnauld (1885–1952), Romanian writer
- Henri Arnauld (1597–1692), French Catholic bishop
- Isaac Arnauld (1566–1617), seigneur de Corbeville and Intendant des finances of France
- Jean Arnauld, French 17th century philosopher and theologian
- Marie Angélique Arnauld (1591–1661), abbess of the Abbey of Port-Royal
- Simon Arnauld, Marquis de Pomponne (1618–1699), French diplomat and minister

== Given name ==
- Arnauld Mercier (born 1972), French former football player and current manager
- Arnauld de Oihenart (1592–1668), Basque lawyer, politician, historian and poet

== See also ==
- Friedrich von Arnauld de la Perière (1888–1969), German Luftwaffe Generalleutnant (lieutenant general)
- Lothar von Arnauld de la Perière (1886–1941), German U-boat commander and the most successful submarine commander in history
- Arnaud (disambiguation)
  - Arnaud (given name)
  - Arnaud (surname)
