= Saint Arnulf =

Saint Arnulf may refer to:

- Arnulf of Metz
- Arnulf of Eynesbury, 9th-century hermit
- Arnulf of Soissons

== See also ==
- Saint Arnold
- Saint Arnoul
