= Gorazd Pavlík =

Czech Orthodox Prelate (1879–1942)

Saint Gorazd of Prague
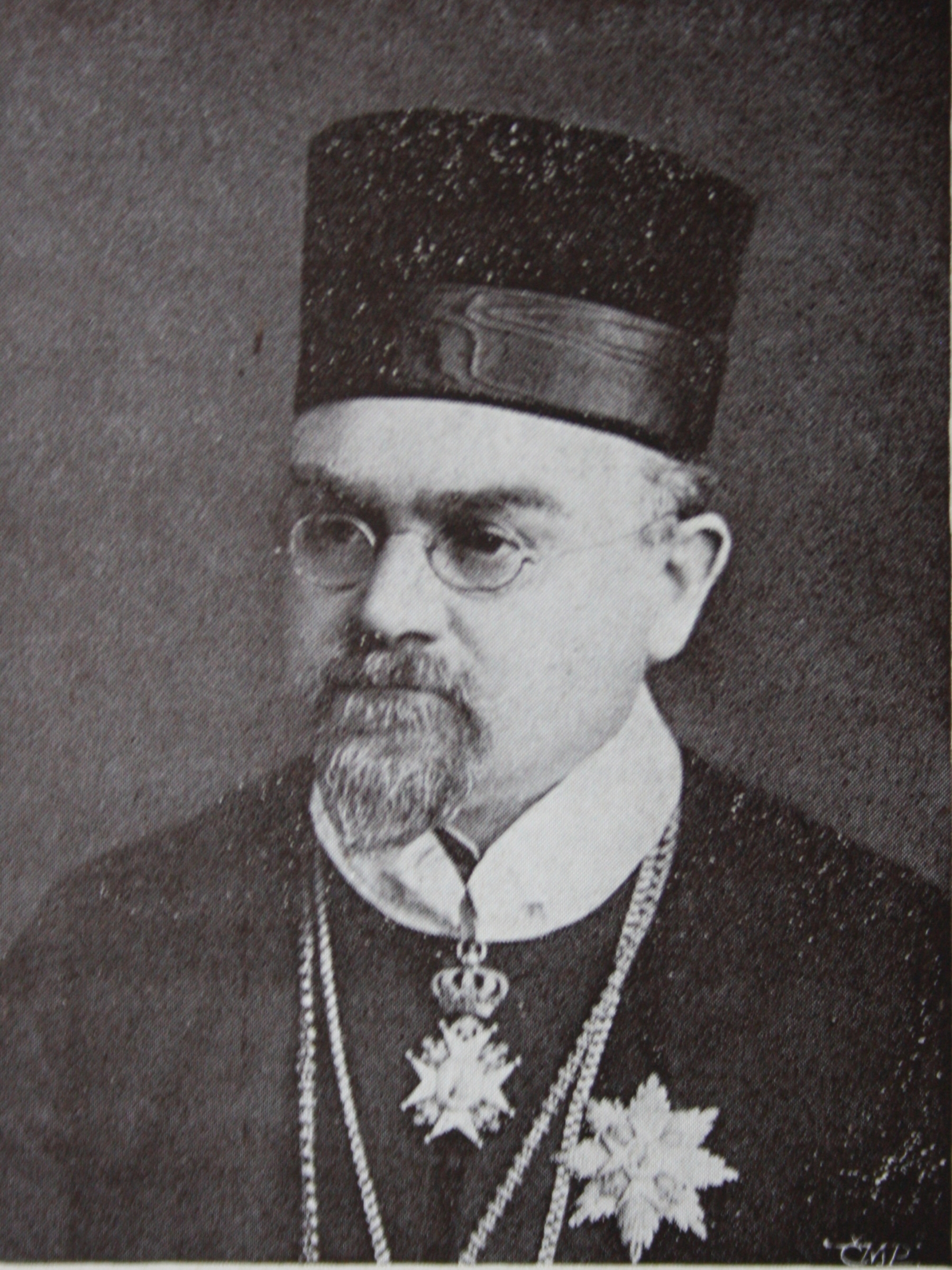

New Martyr, Bishop of Prague, Metropolitan of the Czech Lands and Slovakia
- Born: 26 May 1879; Hrubá Vrbka, Moravia, Austria-Hungary
- Died: 4 September 1942 (aged 63); Prague, Protectorate of Bohemia and Moravia
- Venerated in: Eastern Orthodoxy
- Canonized: 4 May 1961 by the Serbian Orthodox Church (as a New Martyr); 24 August 1987, Olomouc, by the Czech and Slovak Orthodox Church
- Feast: 22 August (OC) or 4 September (NC)

Personal life
- Born: Matěj Pavlík

Religious life
- Denomination: Roman Catholic Church (1879–1920); Czechoslovak Church (1920–1924); Orthodox Church of the Czech Lands and Slovakia (1924–1942)
- Ordination: 5 July 1902
- Consecration: 24 September 1921

Senior posting

Gorazd of Prague, given name Matěj Pavlík (26 May 1879 – 4 September 1942), was the hierarch of the revived Orthodox Church in Czechoslovakia after World War I. During World War II, having provided refuge for the assassins of SS-Obergruppenfuhrer Reinhard Heydrich, called The Hangman of Prague, in the cathedral of Saints Cyril and Methodius in Prague, Gorazd took full responsibility for protecting the assassins after the Schutzstaffel found them in the crypt of the cathedral, hoping to minimize Nazi reprisals on his congregation. This act guaranteed his execution, thus his martyrdom, during the reprisals that followed. His feast day is celebrated on 22 August (OC) or 4 September (NC).

== Life ==
Matěj Pavlík was born on 26 May 1879 in Hrubá Vrbka, Moravia, Austria-Hungary (now the Czech Republic). He was the middle of three brothers. Born into the Roman Catholic society of the Austro-Hungarian Empire, Matěj entered the Faculty of Theology in Olomouc after finishing his earlier education. He was subsequently ordained a priest. During his studies, he was interested in the mission of Cyril and Methodius and of Eastern Orthodoxy.

Establishment of Czechoslovakia in the aftermath of World War I brought complete religious freedom. In this environment, many people left the Catholic Church. While many left the religion completely, some looked either to old Czech Protestant churches or, as Pavlík, to Eastern Orthodoxy. The Serbian Orthodox Church provided a shelter for those looking to Orthodoxy. As a leader in Moravia, the Serbian Orthodox Church agreed to consecrate Pavlík to the episcopate for his homeland. On 24 September 1921, he was consecrated bishop with the name of Gorazd.

Historically, his monastic name of Gorazd was significant as it was the name of Saint Gorazd, the bishop who succeeded Methodius as Bishop of Moravia after he died in 885. Subsequently, Pope Stephen V drove the disciples of Methodius from Moravia as the Latin rite was imposed. Thus, by the choice of his monastic name of Gorazd, the continuity of the Orthodox Church in Moravia from some 1,100 years before was recognized.

Archimandrite Gorazd was named Bishop of Moravia and Silesia on 24 September 1921, and consecrated bishop on the next day at the Cathedral of the Holy Archangel Michael in Belgrade, Yugoslavia, by Serbian Patriarch Dimitrije.

Over the next decade or so, Gorazd and his faithful followers organized parishes and built churches in Bohemia. In all they built eleven churches and two chapels. He had the essential service books translated and published in Czech, which was the language used in the church services. With Carpathian Ruthenia and Slovakia part of Czechoslovakia, he assisted many who had returned to their ancestral Eastern Orthodox faith, thus helping the creation of the Eparchy of Mukachevo and Prešov in 1931.

With the conquest of Czechoslovakia by the Nazis in 1938, the church was placed under the Metropolitan in Berlin, Germany. Reinhard Heydrich was appointed as ruler of Protectorate of Bohemia and Moravia. On 27 May 1942, a group of Czech resistance fighters assassinated Heydrich. In making their escape, the group found refuge in the crypt of the Cathedral. When Gorazd found out a few days later, he recognized the serious burden this placed on the Czech Orthodox Church. Before he left for the consecration to the episcopate of John Gardner in Berlin, he asked that the resistance fighters move elsewhere as soon as possible. However, on 18 June the Nazis found the hiding places after a betrayal by a member of the resistance group, and all the resistance fighters hiding in the church were killed in a Nazi raid.

Reprisals came quickly. The two priests and the senior lay church officials were arrested. Gorazd, wishing to help his fellow believers and the Czech Church itself, took the blame for the actions in the Cathedral on himself, even writing letters to the Nazi authorities. On 27 June 1942, he was arrested and tortured. On 4 September 1942, Gorazd, the Cathedral priests and the lay officials were executed by firing squad at Kobylisy Shooting Range. His body was disposed of at Strašnice Crematorium.

The reprisals went much further as the Nazis conducted widespread roundups of Czechs, including the whole village of Lidice, then summarily killed the men and children, while they placed the women in concentration camps. The Orthodox churches in Moravia and Bohemia were closed and the church forbidden to operate. Metropolitan Seraphim courageously refused to issue any statement condemning Bishop Gorazd. It was not until the end of the war that the Orthodox Church in Czechoslovakia would function again.

== Glorification ==
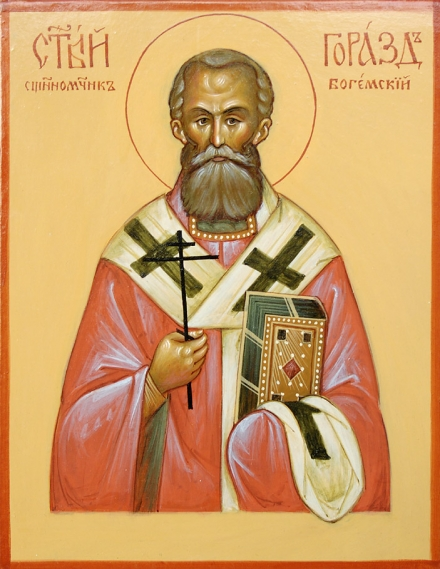
Icon. Hieromartyr Gorazd Bohemian, Transcarpathia, Mukachevo, 2012

By these actions the Orthodox Faithful, led by their bishop, proved the qualities of their little church in bravery and devotion to matters of justice and showed how firmly it was connected to the Czech nation. On 4 May 1961, the Serbian Orthodox Church recognized Gorazd as a new martyr, and on 24 August 1987, he was glorified in the Olomouc Orthodox Church in Moravia.

== Sources ==
- Šuvarský, Jaroslav (1979). Biskup Gorazd (in Czech). Prague: Ústřední církevní nakladatelství.
- Aleš, Pavel, ed. (1995). Pastýř a martyr. Sborník vzpomínek, statí a úvah o životě a odkazu svatého bis-kupa Gorazda k 50. výročí od jeho umučení a 5. výročí svatořečení (in Czech). Olomouc: Olomoucké detašované pracoviště Pravlavné bohoslovecké faculty v Prešově.
- Marek, Pavel; Bureha, Volodymyr (2008). Pravoslavní v Československu v letech 1918—1953: Příspěvek k dějinám Pravoslavné církve v českých zemích, na Slovensku a na Podkarpatské Rusi (in Czech). Brno: Centrum pro studium demokracie a kultury. ISBN 978-80-7325-171-0.
- Marek, Pavel (2019). Biskup Gorazd (Pavlík). Životní příběh hledání ideální církve pro 20. století (in Czech). Olomouc: Univerzita Palackého v Olomouci. ISBN 978-80-244-5413-9.
