= Saint Arnaud =

Saint Arnaud, the French for Saint Arnold, is the name of the following places (all named after Armand-Jacques Leroy de Saint-Arnaud French Minister of War until the Crimean War):

== In Algeria ==
- Saint Arnaud, former name of El Eulma, Algeria

== In Australia ==
- St Arnaud, Victoria
- St Arnaud Box-Ironbark Region, Victoria
- St Arnaud Range National Park, former name of Kara Kara National Park, Victoria

== In New Zealand ==
- Saint Arnaud, New Zealand, in the Tasman District
- Saint Arnaud Range, Tasman District, New Zealand

== See also ==
- Arnaud (disambiguation)
