= Rastislav of Prešov =

Slovak Eastern Orthodox bishop

His Beatitude Rastislav
- Archbishop of Prešov, Metropolitan of the Czech Lands and Slovakia
- Rastislav in 2026
- Church: Orthodox Church of the Czech Lands and Slovakia
- See: Prešov
- Elected: 11 January 2014
- Installed: 10 February 2014
- Predecessor: Christopher
- Other post: Archbishop of Prešov (2012-)

Personal details
- Born: Ondrej Gont; 25 January 1978 (age 48) Snina, Czechoslovakia
- Education: University of Prešov
- Signature: Rastislav's signature

Metropolitan Rastislav (secular name Ondrej Gont; born 25 January 1978) is the current Metropolitan of the Czech Lands and Slovakia and the Primate of the Orthodox Church of the Czech Lands and Slovakia. His full title is His Beautitude Rastislav, Archbishop of Prešov, Metropolitan of the Czech Lands and Slovakia.

== Early life ==
He finished his elementary eight-year school in 1992 and the grammar school in 1996 in his hometown. In 2002, he received his Master of Theology degree from the Orthodox Theological Faculty of Prešov University in Prešov. He defended his diploma thesis on "The Mystery of Death" (Slovak: Tajomstvo smrti).

During the 5th year of theology faculty he completed a four-month study stay at Aristotle University of Thessaloniki in Greece. During his studies he stayed in the monastery of St. Thessalonians and entrusted to the spiritual care of Archimandrite Ireneos (Charalambakis). He spent two weeks in the monastery of St. Dionysius of Olympia and one week at the Mount Athos, where he visited several monasteries.

== Serving as priest ==
Prior to his graduation ceremonies, Metropolitan Nicholas (Kocvár) of the Czech lands and Slovakia tonsured him as a reader in the Chapel of St. Apostle and Evangelist John Theologian at the Orthodox Priest Seminary in Prešov. On 7 September 2003, metropolitan Nicholas consecrated him a deacon. On 21 September 2003, Archbishop Miron (Chodakowski) of Hajnówka ordained him a priest in the Cathedral Church of St. Prince Alexander Nevsky in Prešov.

In December 2003 he was appointed as spiritual administrator of the Children's Home of St. Nicholas in Medzilaborce. He worked in five separate educational groups with children from the earliest age until they left the Children's Home. He has worked with educators and teachers to apply basic Christian principles to children's lives. These were children who, in addition to social sanctions, also suffered mental disabilities. In the Children's Home he prepared two boys to study theology at the Orthodox Theological Faculty of the Prešov University. In 2008 he founded the Youth Choir of St. Apostle Andrew.

Since September 2007 he taught the religious education at the Secondary Professional School at the Reeducational Center of St. Nicholas for underage mothers with children in Medzilaborce. Teaching required a special approach because they were prescribed pupils in a re-education center due to educational problems and behavioral disorders combined with mental disability and underage pregnancy.

Since 2006 he completed three stays in the monastery of St. John of Russia in Pefkochori in Halkidiki, Greece. The advice and instructions of the local archimandrite Timotheus (Tsotras). In 2007 he visited the monastery of Wyszow in Poland. Igumen Paphnutius and monk Jerome acquainted him with the way of life in the monastery there. Between 2011 and 2012 he spent a month in the monastery of Archangels in Kovilj, Serbia. The spiritual advice and instructions of the Kovilj abbot bishop Porfirije Perić were decisive for him in the decision to accept monasticism. Today, Porfirije Perić is a head and Patriarch of Serbian Orthodox Church.

On 6 October 2012, at the Orthodox Monastery in Komárno bishop Tichon (Hollósy) of Komárno tonsured him monk with name Rastislav. In same month he was elevated to the rank of hegumen, and archimandrite.

== Bishop ==
On 20 October 2012, he was elected Archbishop of Prešov and Slovakia at the eparchial assembly of the Prešov Orthodox Eparchy. His solemn proclamation was held on 17 November 2012 and the Episcopal Chirotonia (consecration) and Intronization on 18 November 2012 in the Cathedral Church of St. Alexander Nevsky in Prešov.

In July 2013, he led a delegation of the Czech and Slovak Orthodox Church to the festivities devoted to the 1025th anniversary of the baptism of Russia.

In 9 December 2013, he replaced Archbishop Simeon as the Metropolitan Administrator, who, however, declared that his replacement was invalid. Simeon's opinion is shared by the majority of Orthodox Churches in the world. For this reason, Archbishop Rastislav was proclaimed by the Ecumenical Patriarchate as persona non grata. Simeon refused to recognize the church assembly, which elected Archbishop Rastislav in Prešov on 11 January 2014 by the Orthodox Church of the Czech Lands and Slovakia. The Church's unlawful acts, began with the controversial dismissal of Archbishop Simeon and continued with the unlawful appointment of Lord Jáchym Postoj to Bishops Rastislav, Jáchym and Juraj, as expressed by Patriarch Bartholomew in an official letter to the Minister of Culture of the Czech Republic.

After his alleged election, Archbishop Rastislav was not invited to the Synaxis of the Heads of the Orthodox Churches, which is a manifestation of his non-recognition and thus the isolation of the Czech and Slovak Orthodox Church from the rest of the Orthodox world.

The constitution of the Orthodox Church governs the election of bishops and metropolitans. According to the constitution, the proposal of the council, approved by the Sacred Synod of Canonical Capability, and then the election by the eparchial assembly, by a majority of two-thirds, is required for the establishment of a bishop. No other way is permitted by the constitution. The election of the metropolitan is carried out by the Orthodox Church from two candidates - the Archbishop of Prague and the Archbishop of Prešov. In the case of the election of Archbishop Rastislav, the illegitimate archbishop of Prague, Jáchym, was illegally appointed by a Synod composed of 3 people, while Jáchym also voted in his own favor, which makes him elected by his own choice, making the choice of the metropolitan illegal.

This issue is theoretically addressed by various authors, and extensive analysis is available. Archbishop Rastislav is considered by many not to be the legitimate primate of the Czech and Slovak Orthodox Church, except for some such as Patriarch Kirill of Moscow, the Orthodox Church in America, and the Greek Orthodox Church of Antioch. Rastislav was even titled as the "Archbishop of Prague" when congratulated by the Patriarchate of Antioch regarding his election. Furthermore, according to the tomos of the Ecumenical Patriarchate of Constantinople, Archbishop Rastislav is no longer a canonical bishop. This issue has been addressed by the Canadian Commission of the Ecumenical Patriarchate, which, among other things, is responsible for preparing documents for bishops' tribunals.
