= Arnolfo =

Arnolfo is the Italian form of the given name Arnulf. Notable people with the given name include:

- Arnolfo di Cambio (born c. 1240), Italian architect
- Arnolfo Teves Jr. (born 1971), Filipino politician

== See also ==
- Arnulf
- Arnolfini (disambiguation)
