= Orthodox Church of the Czech Lands and Slovakia =

Eastern Orthodox jurisdiction

Orthodox Church of the Czech Lands and Slovakia
- Pravoslavná církev v Českých zemích a na Slovensku (Czech); Pravoslávna cirkev v českých krajinách a na Slovensku (Slovak)
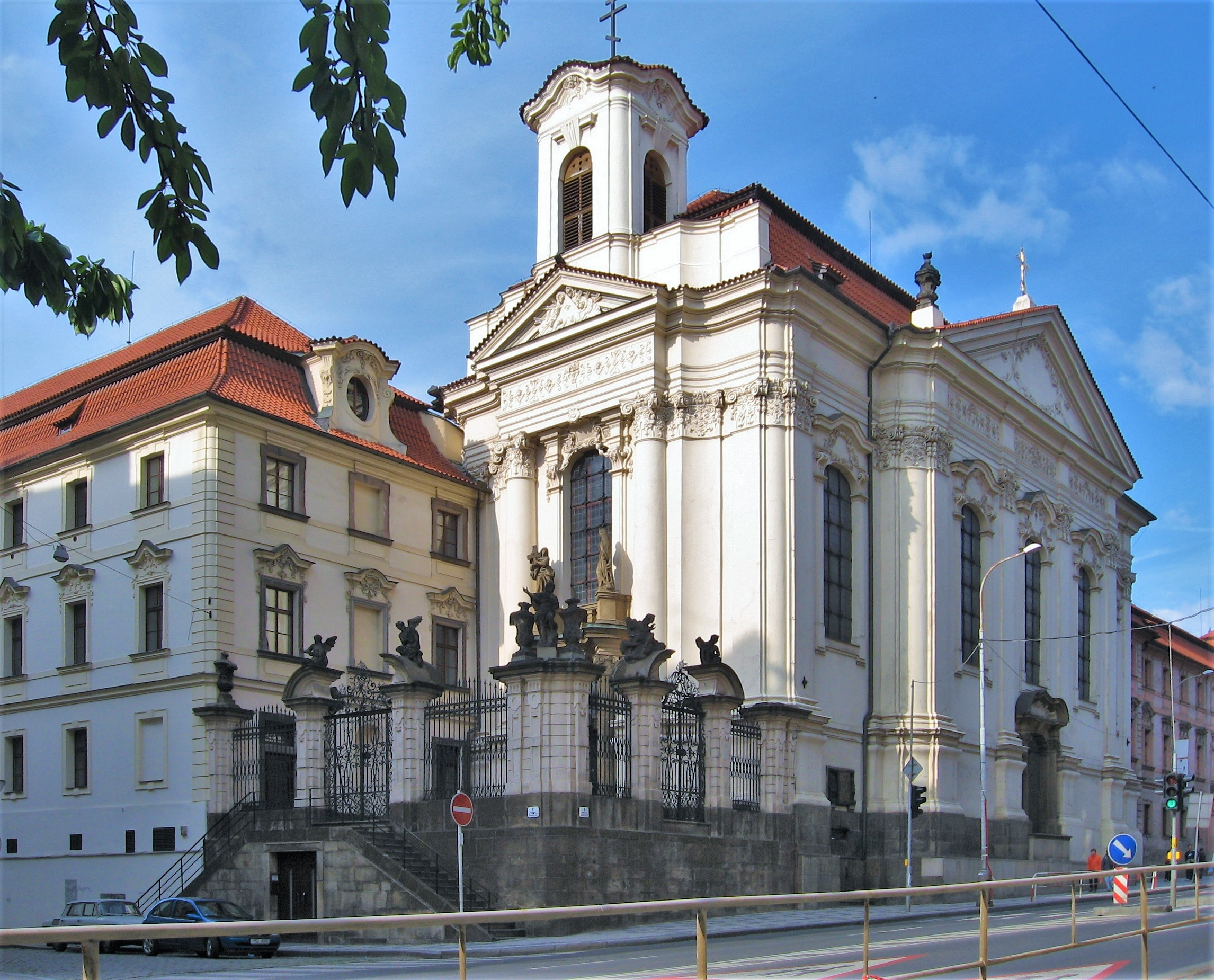
- Saints Cyril and Methodius Cathedral, Prague
- Type: Autocephaly
- Classification: Christian
- Orientation: Eastern Orthodox
- Scripture: Septuagint; New Testament
- Theology: Eastern Orthodox theology
- Primate: Rastislav of Prešov
- Bishops: 6
- Parishes: 172
- Language: Church Slavonic, Czech and Slovak
- Headquarters: Prague, Czech Republic; Prešov, Slovakia
- Territory: Czech Republic; Slovakia
- Founder: Ss. Cyril and Methodius (as mission to the Slavs); Gorazd Pavlík (as Serbian Orthodox Eparchy of Moravia and Silesia)
- Independence: 1951 from the Russian Orthodox Church
- Recognition: Autocephaly recognised in 1951 by the Russian Orthodox Church and in 1998 by the Ecumenical Patriarchate of Constantinople.
- Members: 75,000 (2021)
- Official website: Czech official website Slovak official website

The Orthodox Church of the Czech Lands and Slovakia (Czech: Pravoslavná církev v Českých zemích a na Slovensku; Slovak: Pravoslávna cirkev v českých krajinách a na Slovensku), sometimes abbreviated OCCLS, is an autocephalous Eastern Orthodox church that territorially covers the countries of the Czech Republic and Slovakia. The current primate of the Czech and Slovak Orthodox Church is Rastislav of Prešov (born Ondrej Gont), Metropolitan of the Czech Lands and Slovakia since 2014. The church has approximately 75,000 followers, of whom 50,000 live in Slovakia and 23,000 in the Czech Republic.

== History ==
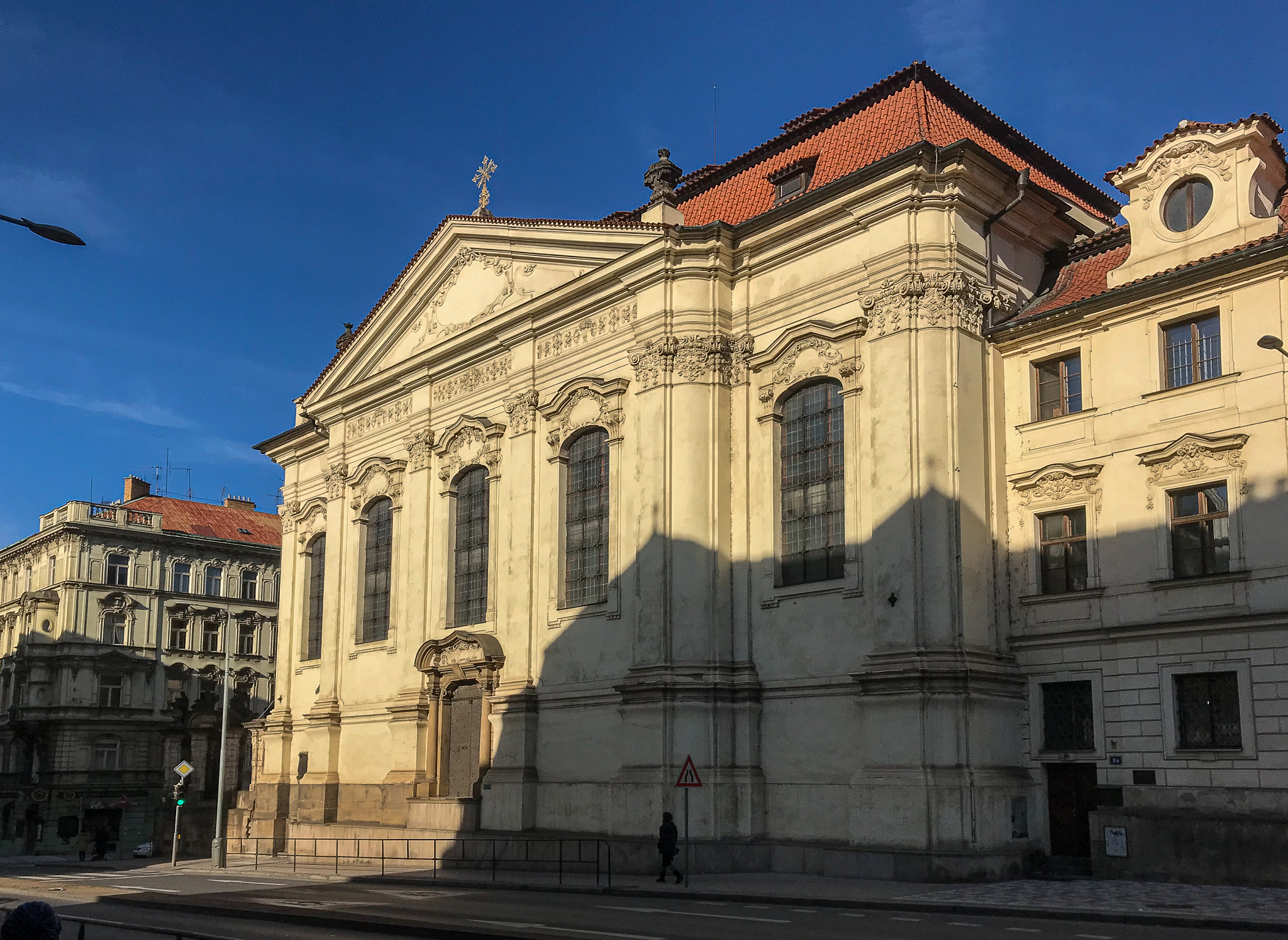
Saints Cyril and Methodius Cathedral in Prague

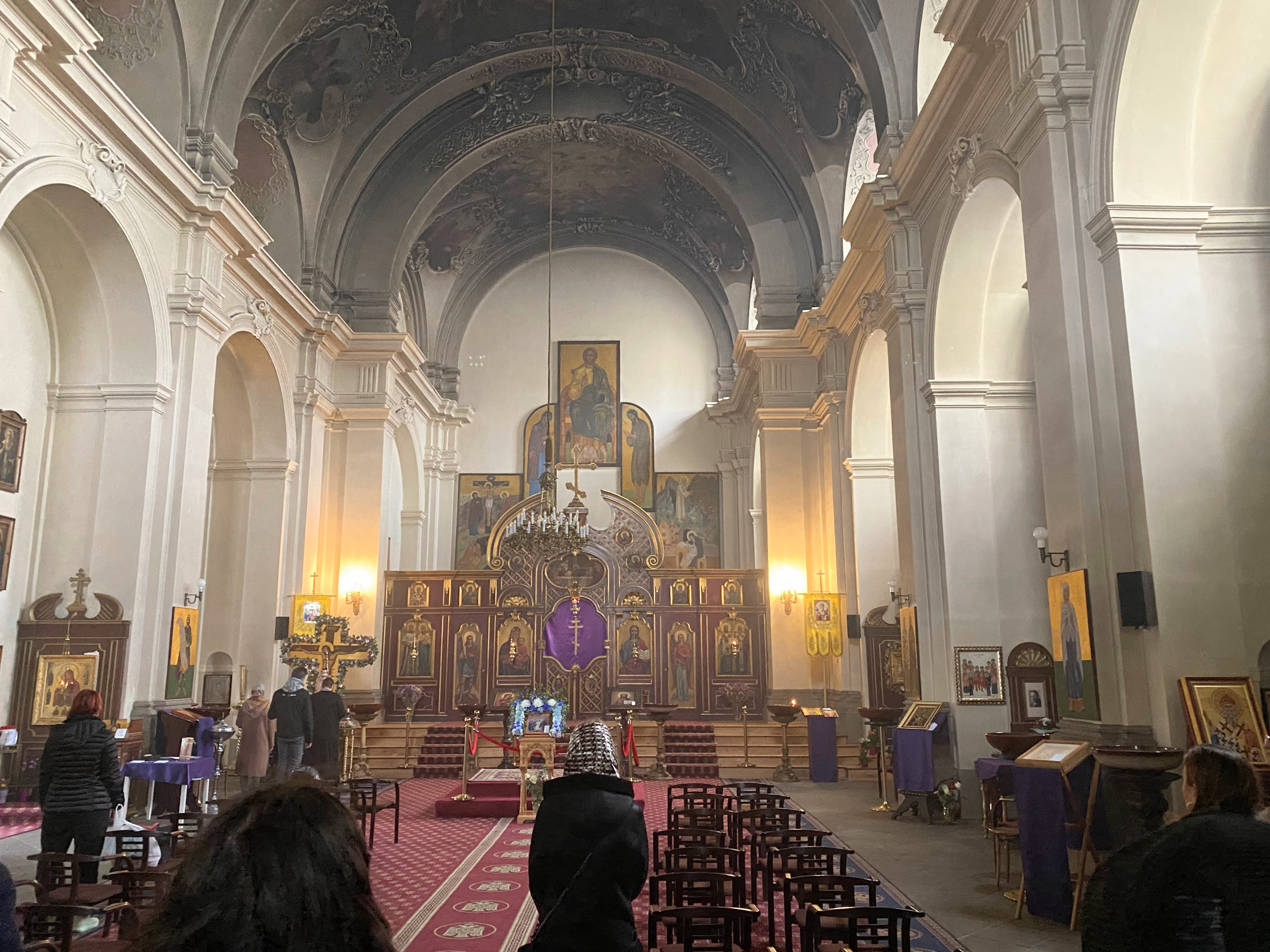
Interior of the Saints Cyril and Methodius Cathedral in Prague

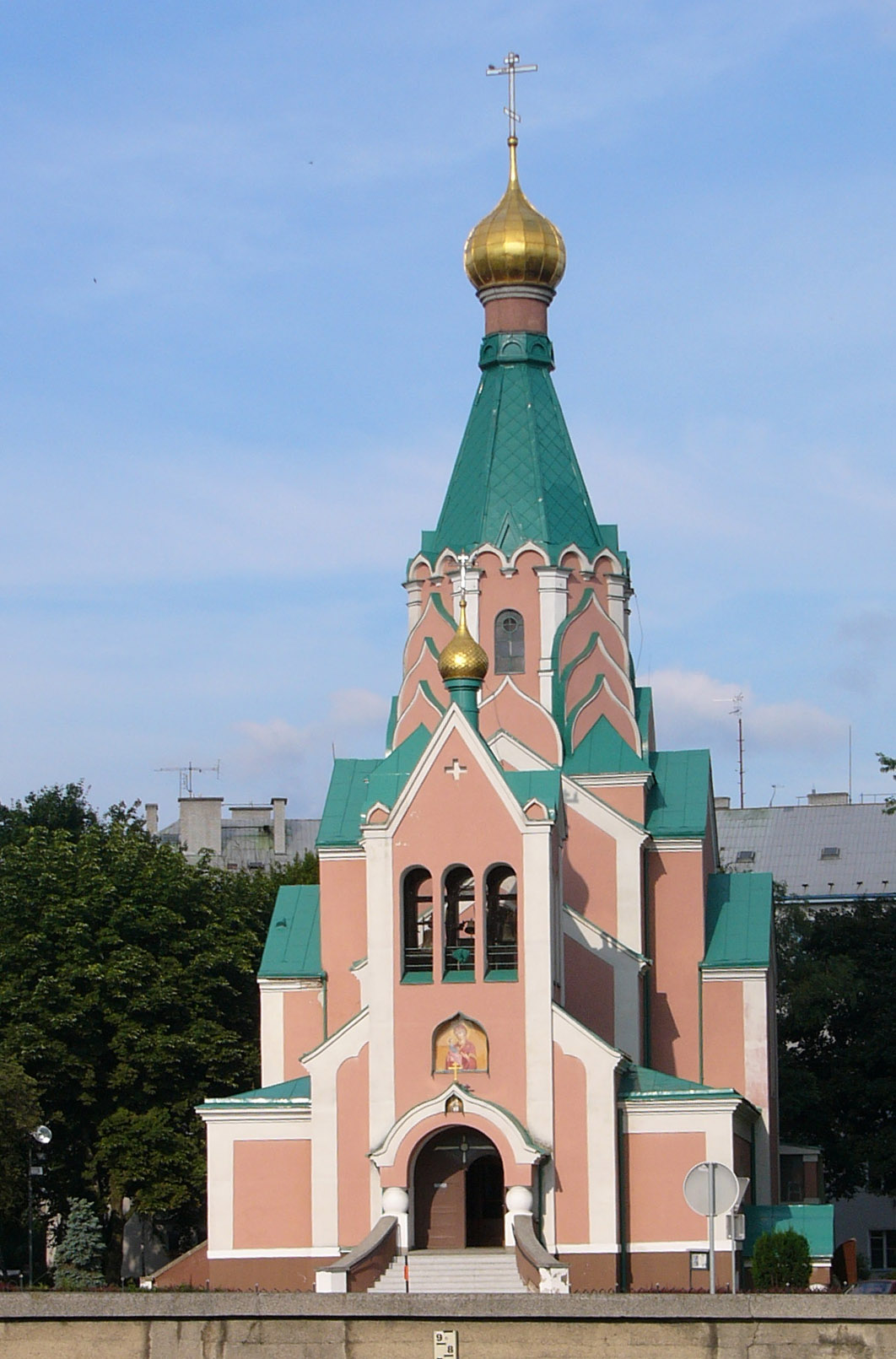
Church of St Gorazd in Olomouc

=== Foundation ===
The present-day church occupies the land of Great Moravia, where the brothers Ss. Cyril and Methodius began their mission to the Slavs, introducing the liturgical and canonical order of the Eastern Orthodox Church, translated into Church Slavonic, using mostly Greek calques to explain concepts for which no Slavic term existed. In doing this they developed the first Slavic alphabet, a mixture of Greek and Hebrew-based characters with a few invented characters of their own to represent unique Slavic sounds.

This was done at the express invitation of the powerful ruler Rastislav of Moravia. Yet within the Moravian state there was a Frankish party among the nobility who desired closer ties with East Francia, whose ruler, Louis the German, was Ratislav's nominal suzerain, and a Frankish bishop had ecclesiastical jurisdiction over a small part of Ratislav's domain that had earlier converted to Christianity. Despite the Photian Schism, the churches of Rome and Constantinople still preserved some semblance of unity, and Pope Nicholas I did not want to see the formation of a large independent Frankish church in Central Europe. When an appeal of the ecclesiastical issue was made to Rome, Nicholas summoned both Cyril and Methodius and the complaining Frankish parties to his court to deliberate the disagreement. Nicholas died before their arrival, but the new Pope Adrian II reached a compromise after hearing both sides: Old Church Slavonic was confirmed as a liturgical language alongside Greek, Hebrew and Latin, and Methodius was confirmed as bishop with a Frankish co-adjutor, Wiching. Adrian was convinced by Cyril's impassioned defence of the Slavic liturgy in which he cited 1 Corinthians 14:19 "Yet in the church I had rather speak five words with my understanding, that by my voice I might teach others also, than ten thousand words in an unknown tongue." Cyril fell ill while the brothers were still at Rome, and on his deathbed he asked Methodius to swear to return to Moravia and complete the mission to the Slavs instead of returning to the monastic life on Mount Olympus as he had intended to do.

Methodius kept his word and returned, but his mission was interrupted by the death of Ratislav, as the new ruler, Svatopluk I of Moravia, sided with the pro-Frankish party and had Methodius imprisoned for almost three years, until he was freed through the intercession of Pope John VIII. For the next ten years, Methodius continued his work, but the death of John VIII in 882 removed his papal protection, and Methodius died in 885. After this, Pope Stephen V of Rome confirmed his Swabian co-adjutor Wiching as bishop. Methodius's disciples were imprisoned, expelled to Bulgaria, like Gorazd and many others, or enslaved. The expelled, led by Clement of Ohrid and Naum of Preslav, were of great importance to the Eastern Orthodox faith in Bulgaria, which had been Christian since 864, after they were released from prison and escorted to the Danube. In AD 870 the Fourth Council of Constantinople granted the Bulgarians the right to have the oldest organized autocephalous Slavic Orthodox Church that little later, from autonomous Bulgarian archbishopric, became patriarchate. A major event that strengthened the process of Christianization was the development of the Cyrillic script in Bulgaria at the founding by Naum and Clement of the Preslav Literary School in the 9th century. The Cyrillic script and the liturgy in Old Church Slavonic were declared official in Bulgaria in 893.

=== Survival and revival (17–19th century) ===
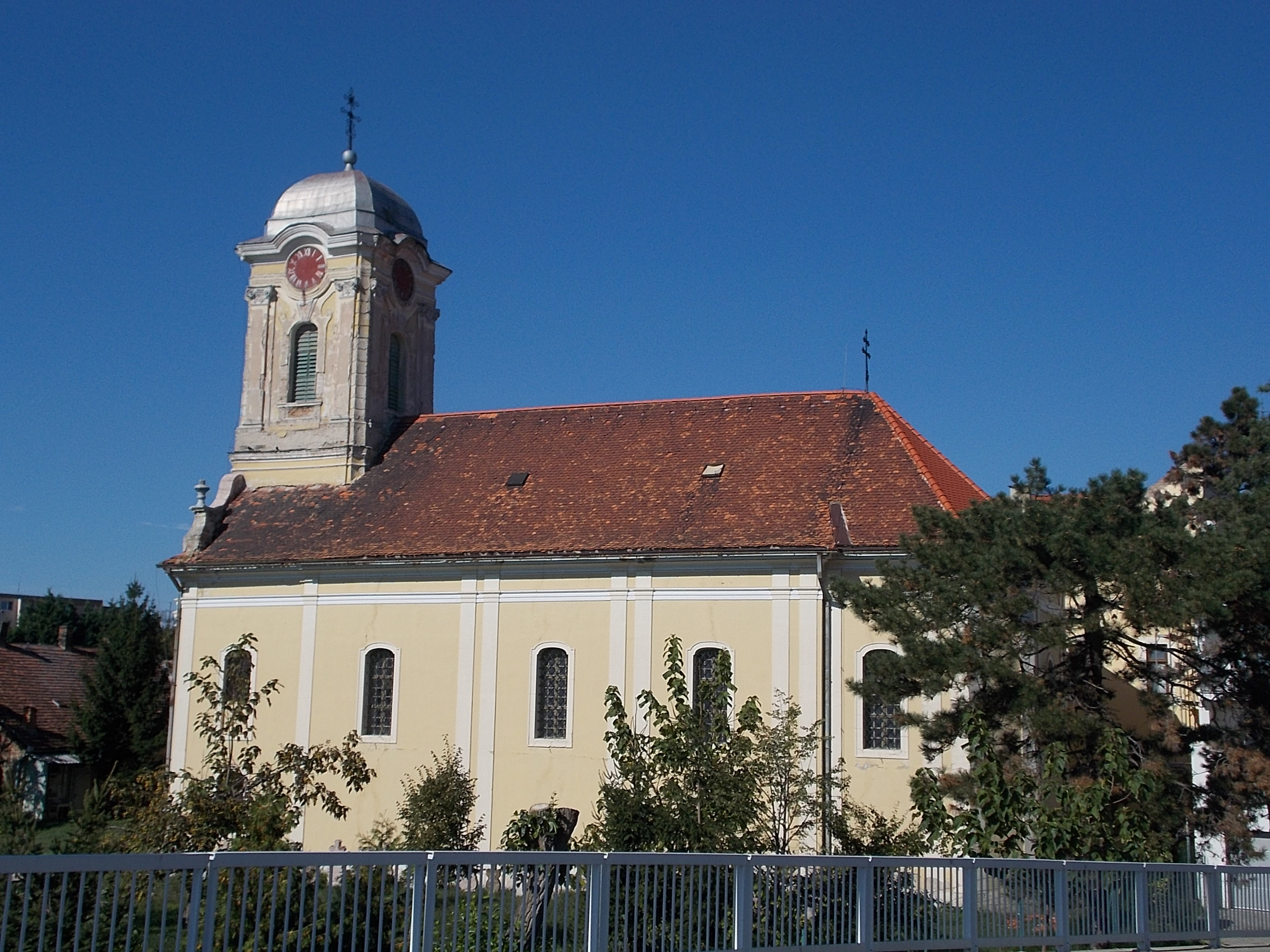
Eastern Orthodox Church in Komárno (Slovakia), built in the middle of the 18th century under jurisdiction of the Serbian Orthodox Eparchy of Buda

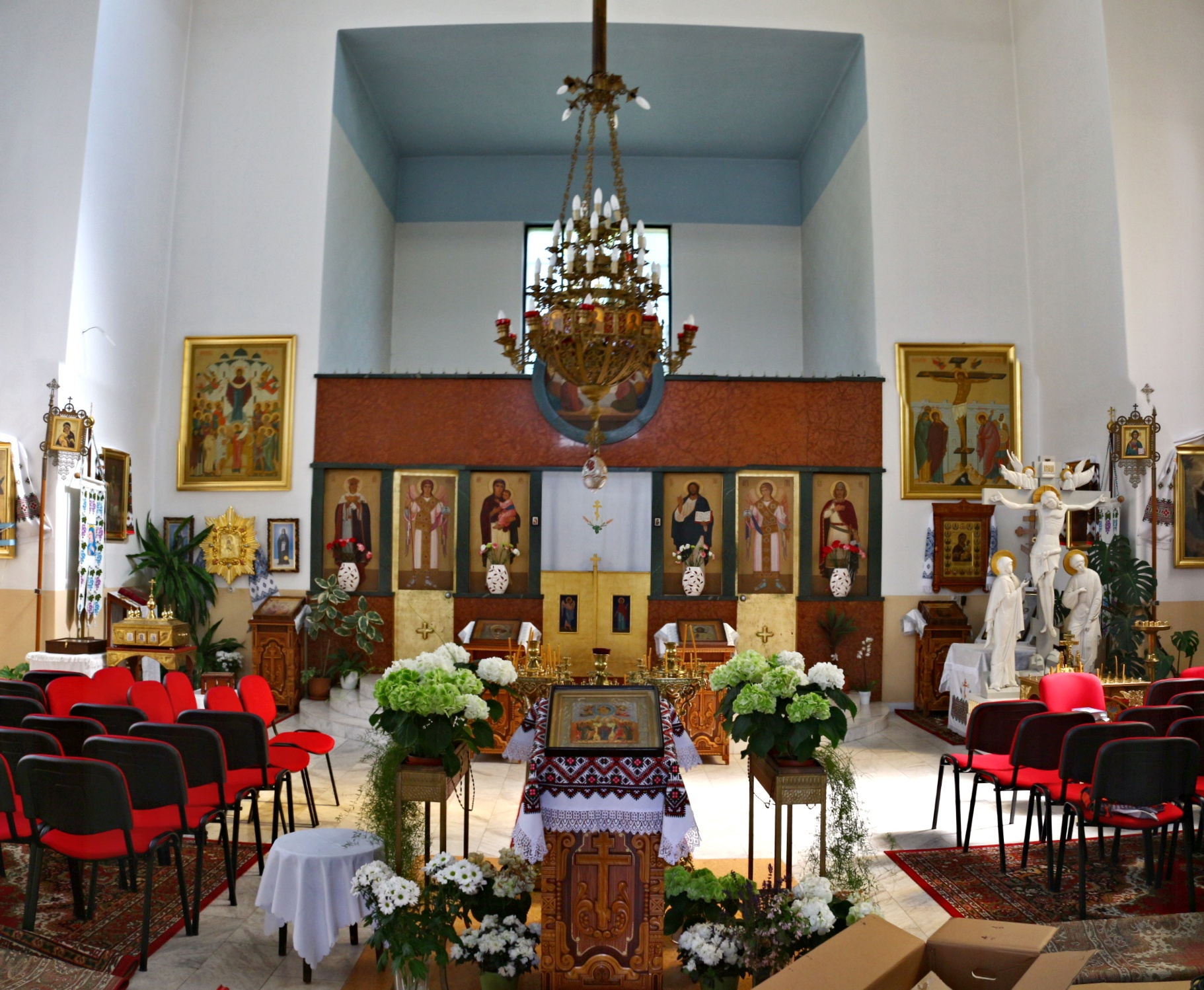
Interior of the Church of Saint Wenceslaus in Brno

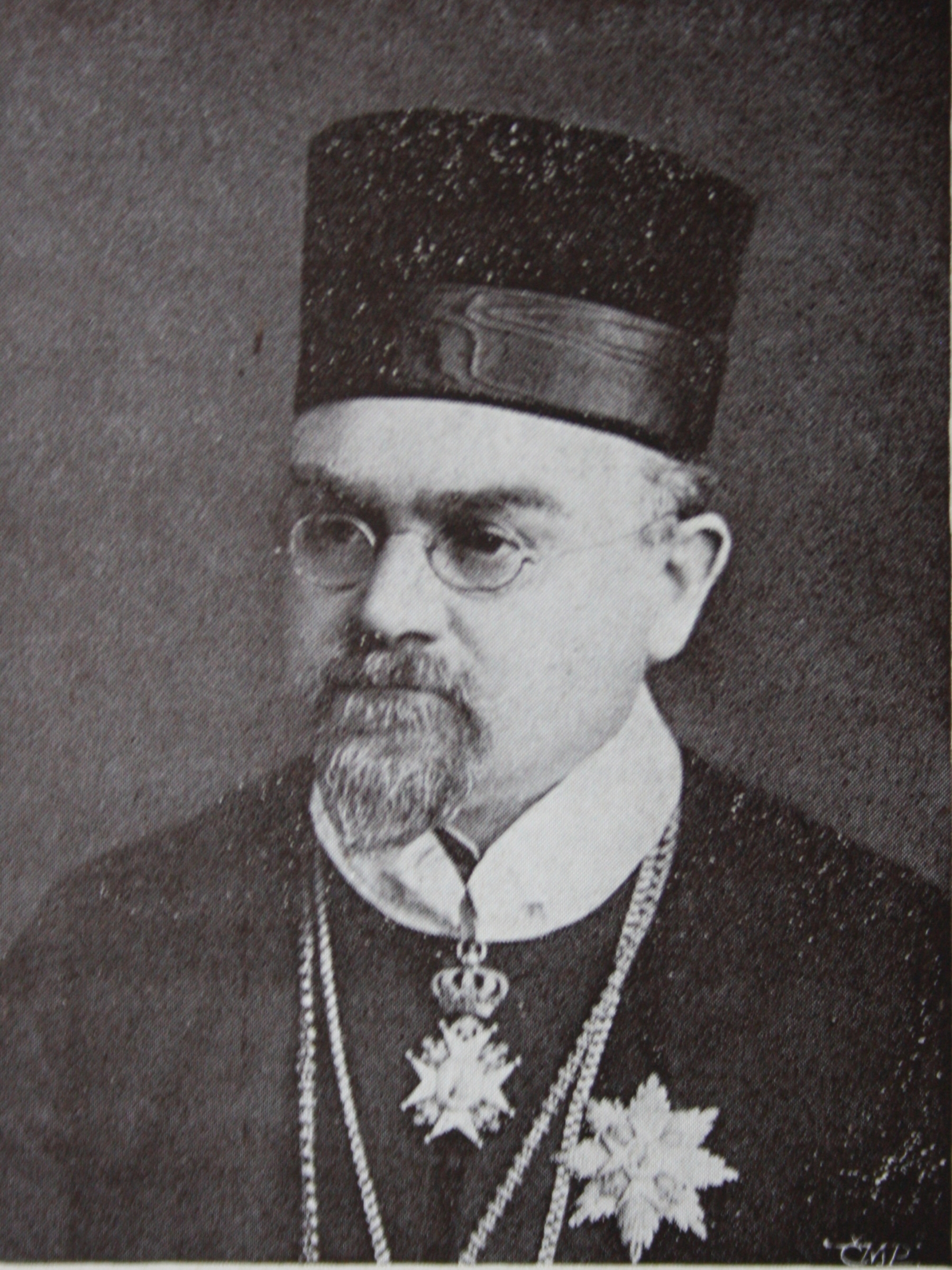
Eastern Orthodox Bishop Gorazd of Prague (1921–1942)

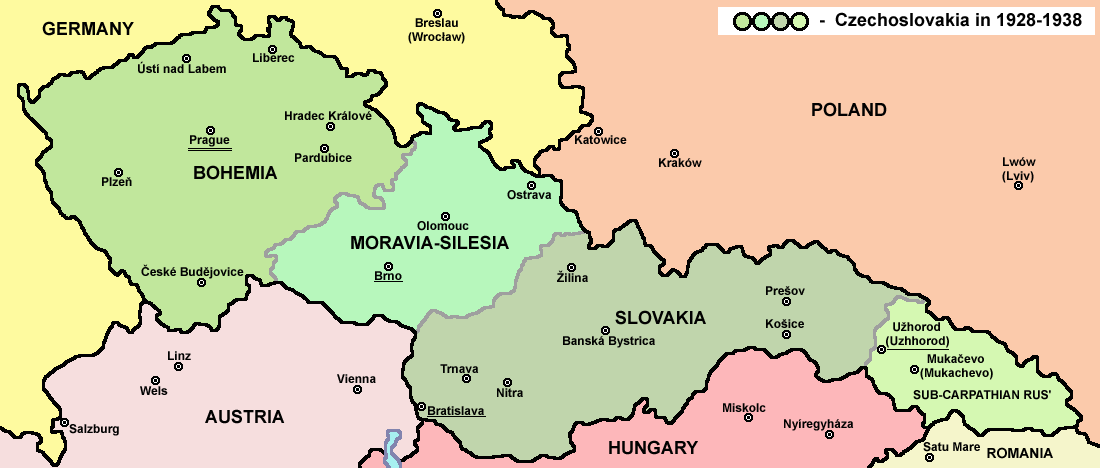
Czechoslovakia, from 1920 to 1938

The Eastern Orthodox ecclesiastical order survived in present-day eastern Slovakia and neighboring regions due to its nearness and influence to Kievan Rus', especially among the population of the Rusins, until the middle of the 17th century when the Union of Uzhhorod was brought about in the Kingdom of Hungary. During the times of suppression, remaining Eastern Orthodox Christians from the region kept their ties with neighboring Eastern Orthodox Eparchy of Buda of the Serbian Patriarchate of Peć and later with the Metropolitanate of Karlovci (that became in 1848 the Patriarchate of Karlovci). One of the most northern parishes of the Serbian Orthodox Church existed in the Slovak city of Komárno with local church built in the 18th century still standing today.

Between 1871 and 1916 Orthodox faithfuls in Prague had the magnificent Saint Nicholas Church, one of the largest churches of the city.

After the creation of Czechoslovakia in 1918, legal restraints to Eastern Orthodoxy were removed. In the new state, Eastern Orthodox communities were mainly located in the eastern parts of the country, including Carpatho-Rus' that was incorporated into Czechoslovakia in 1919. In that region, the city of Mukachevo was located with its traditions going back to the old Eastern Orthodox Eparchy of Mukachevo, that existed before the Union of Uzhhorod. In the spirit of Eastern Orthodox revival, many people in the region left the Uniate (Greek Catholic) Church. Since there were no Eastern Orthodox bishops in Czechoslovakia, local leaders looked to the Serbian Orthodox Church because the Serbs were historically and ethnically close to the Czechs, Slovaks and Rusins. That view was also supported by state authorities of Czechoslovakia (1920). In order to regulate the ecclesiastical order, Bishop Dositej Vasić of Niš (Serbia) arrived in Prague and met with leaders of the Eastern Orthodox community, receiving them into full communion (1921).

Among those seeking to restore ties with the Eastern Orthodox Church was Catholic priest Matěj Pavlík, who had been interested in Eastern Orthodoxy for years. The Serbian Orthodox Church thus consented to receive him in full communion and he became archimandrite with the name Gorazd, in honor of Saint Gorazd of Moravia, disciple and successor of Saint Methodius, Archbishop of Moravia. On September 25, 1921, Archimandrite Gorazd was consecrated Bishop of Moravia and Silesia at the St. Michael's Cathedral in Belgrade, Yugoslavia, by Serbian Patriarch Dimitrije. Bishop Gorazd received jurisdiction over Czech Lands.

As the Orthodox leader in the new nation of Czechoslovakia, Bishop Gorazd laid the foundations of the Orthodox Church throughout Bohemia, Moravia, and also into Slovakia. In Bohemia, he oversaw the building of eleven churches and two chapels. He also published the essential books for the conduct of church services that were translated into Czech. He provided aid to those in Slovakia and Carpatho-Rus', which then was part of Czechoslovakia, and who wanted to return to Eastern Orthodox Faith from the Unia, Union with Rome. Thus, in the inter-war period, Bishop Gorazd built the small Czech church that during World War II would show how firmly it was connected to the Czech nation.

By 1931, Eastern Orthodox renewal in eastern Slovakia and Carpatho-Rus' was progressing very well, allowing for the creation of the second diocese, the Eparchy of Mukachevo and Prešov. That diocese was also created under the auspices of the Serbian Orthodox Church. The first bishop of Mukachevo and Prešov was Damaskin Grdanički. In 1938, he was succeeded by Bishop Vladimir Rajić.

In 1938, Nazi Germany succeeded in annexing the Sudetenland from Czechoslovakia during the Munich Conference. In the same year, after the First Vienna Award, southern parts of Slovakia and Carpathian Ruthenia were annexed by Hungary. Since the city of Mukačevo was taken by Hungary, bishop Vladimir had to move to the city of Khust. In 1939, Nazi Germany annexed the remainder of the Czech lands into the Protectorate of Bohemia and Moravia and installed a pro-Nazi regime in Slovakia. At the same time, Hungary occupied the rest of Carpathian Ruthenia and in 1941 Hungarian authorities arrested bishop Vladimir Rajić and deported him back to Serbia.

The years of Nazi occupation (1938–1945) were marked by renewed restrictions and persecutions. By 1942, Reinhard Heydrich, architect of the Final Solution, had become governor of the Czech Protectorate. After the May 27, 1942 assassination attack on Heydrich's car in Prague, Czech and Slovak partisans took refuge in the crypt of the Ss. Cyril and Methodius Cathedral before continuing their escape. They were aided by senior church laymen, who kept Bishop Gorazd informed. However, their presence was discovered by the Nazis, and on June 18 the Nazis attacked their hiding place in the cathedral, forcing them to commit suicide. The Orthodox priests, laymen, and Bishop Gorazd were arrested and killed by firing squad on September 4, 1942.

In reprisal the Nazis forbade the church to operate in Bohemia and Moravia. Churches and chapels were closed, and a rounding up of Czechs was conducted, including the whole village of Lidice, whose inhabitants were either killed or sent to forced labor camps. For the Orthodox, the whole church fell under Nazi persecution and was decimated. A total of 256 Orthodox priests and laymen were executed, and church life came to a stop.

=== Post-War developments (after 1945) ===
In 1945, after the incorporation of Carpatho-Rus' by the USSR as Zakarpattia Oblast of the Ukrainian SSR, eastern parts of the Eparchy of Mukačevo and Prešov were transferred from the jurisdiction of the Serbian Orthodox Church to the jurisdiction of the Russian Orthodox Church, and on that territory a new Eparchy of Mukačevo and Užgorod was formed, while the western part of the diocese remained in Czechoslovakia and was reorganized as the Eparchy of Prešov.

After World War II, the Orthodox Church in Czechoslovakia began its recovery without its bishop. On December 9, 1951, the Patriarch of Moscow granted autocephaly to the Orthodox Church of Czechoslovakia, and this was recognized by nearly all Orthodox local churches. This action was not recognized by the Ecumenical Patriarch of Constantinople, who made claims to jurisdiction, regarding the Czechoslovak church as being autonomous under its authority. The Patriarch of Constantinople later issued a tomos, or official proclamation, of autocephaly in 1998.

When the Communists came to power in April 1950, the government convoked a synod of the Slovak Greek Catholic Church in Prešov, where five priests and a large number of laymen signed a document declaring that the union with Rome was disbanded and asking to be received into the jurisdiction of the Moscow Patriarchate, later the Orthodox Church of Czechoslovakia. Greek Catholic faithful and clergy were presented with the choice of remaining in union with Rome and becoming Latin Church Catholics or keeping their Byzantine rite and becoming Orthodox. The government transferred control of the Greek Catholic churches and other property to the Eastern Orthodox Church.

During the Prague Spring in 1968, the former Greek Catholic parishes were allowed to restore communion with Rome. As a result of anti-Russian sentiment, of the 292 parishes involved, 205 voted in favor. This was one of the few reforms by Dubček that survived the Soviet invasion the same year. However, most church buildings remained in the hands of the Eastern Orthodox Church as they had originally been built as Orthodox churches, and/or their congregations had in large measure voted to have their parishes placed under the omophorion of the Eastern Orthodox Church in 1950. After communism was overthrown in the 1989 Velvet Revolution, most of the church property was returned to the Slovak Greek Catholic Church by 1993.

The martyrdom of Bishop Gorazd was recognized by the Serbian Orthodox Church on May 4, 1961, which canonized Gorazd as a New Martyr. Subsequently, on August 24, 1987, he was canonized at the Cathedral of St. Gorazd in Olomouc, Moravia.

=== After the Velvet Revolution (After 1989) ===
The fall of communism in the Eastern bloc and the Velvet Revolution in Czechoslovakia changed the potlicial and religious situation dramatically. Archbishop Rastislav of Prešov was elected by the Extraordinary Synod held on January 11, 2014, as the new primate. On December 9, 2013, the Synod removed Archbishop Simeon (Jakovlevic) of Brno and Olomouc from his position as Locum Tenens (ad interim administrator following the resignation of the previous primate, Archbishop Krystof, over allegations of sexual relations with women), and appointed Archbishop Rastislav in his place, an action against which Archbishop Simeon protested and which was deplored by Ecumenical Patriarch Bartholomew I of Constantinople, who had supported Krystof.

==== 2018 Moscow–Constantinople schism ====
Due to a numerous Ukrainian minority in Czechia and Slovakia, the conflict between the Ukrainian Orthodox Church – Moscow Patriarchate (UOC-MP) and Ukrainian Orthodox Church – Kiev Patriarchate (UOC-KP) spilled over also to Czechia and Slovakia.

The head of the Orthodox Church of the Czech Lands and Slovakia (OCCLS), Archbishop Rastislav of Prešov, met in November 2018 with the head of the UOC-MP, Metropolitan Onufry and condemned the Ecumenical Patriarchate of Constantinople declaration of autocephaly of the Ukraniana Ortodox Church from the Russian Ortodox Church. Similarilly, also Archbishop of Prague of the OCCLS, Michael, met with Metropolitan Agafangel of Odessa of the UOC-MP to show support with the UOC-MP.

On the other hand, in November 2019, Bishop Isaiah of Šumperk concelebrated with Epiphanius of Kyiv of UOC-KP. In March 2022, Bishop Isaiah expressed lack of understanding in reference to ROC's support for Putin. According to Bishop Isaiah, the eparchy of Olomouc-Brno (Moravia) does support the Orthodox Church of Ukraine (OCU) while the eparchy of Prague (Bohemia) tends towards the ROC.

Furthermore, in April 2024, Metropolitan Rastislav Gont of the OCCLS condemned the "unjust and inexcusable persecution of the Ukrainian Orthodox Church [UOC-MP] by the Ukrainian state power [...] seeking to replace the canonical Church with schismatic structures [OCU]".

== Administration ==
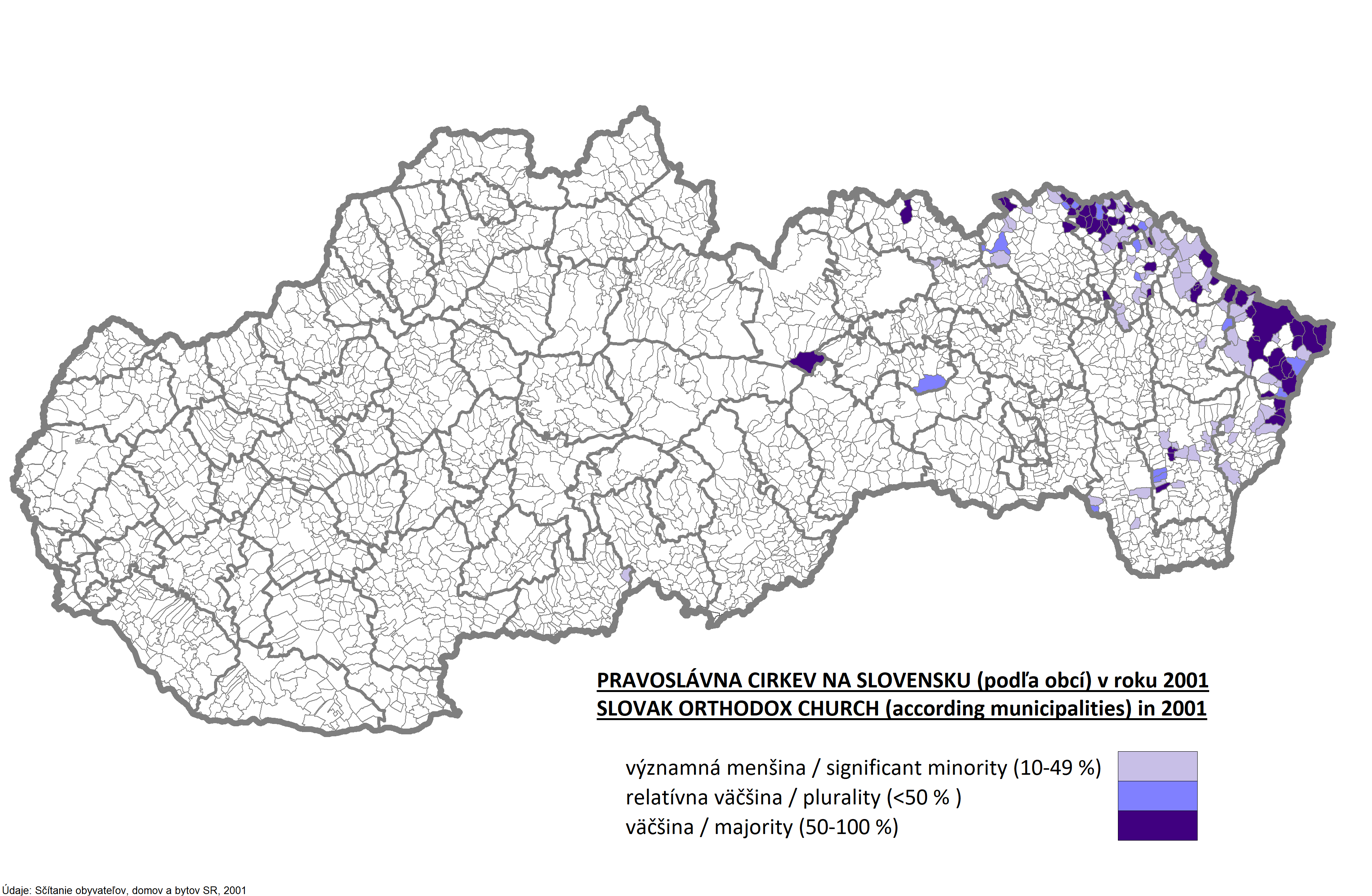
The Orthodox Church in the municipalities of Slovakia, according to the 2001 census (in %)

After Czechoslovakia separated in 1993, church activities continued in each new country as separate legal entities: in the Czech Republic as the Orthodox Church in the Czech Lands and in the Slovak Republic as the Orthodox Church in Slovakia, with canonical unity maintained as the Orthodox Church of the Czech Lands and Slovakia. The church is now organized into four eparchies divided into two administrative centers: the Metropolitan Council for the Czech Republic resident in Prague, and the Metropolitan Council for the Slovak Republic in Prešov. Under the Council of the Czech Lands (Prague) are the eparchies of Prague and Olomouc-Brno, while the eparchies of Prešov and Michalovce are under the Council of Slovakia (Prešov).

After the death of Metropolitan Dorotheus of Prague and All Czechoslovakia, Archbishop Nicholas of Prešov was elected the new metropolitan, and the church's primatial see was moved from Prague to Prešov. Metr. Nicholas reposed (died) on January 30, 2006, and succeeded by Archbishop Christopher of Prague and the Czech Lands since May 2, 2006.

In the Czech Republic, there are 82 parishes: 51 in Bohemia and 31 in Moravia and Silesia. In Slovakia, there are 90 parishes: 69 in the eparchy of Prešov and 21 in the eparchy of Michalovce. The Orthodox Theological Faculty of the University of Prešov functions as a seminary for future priests of the combined church, with a satellite campus in Olomouc.

The Monastery of Saint Procopius of Sazava is located in Most, and the Monastery of the Dormition of the Theotokos in Vilémov.

The current primate of the Czechoslovak Orthodox Church is Rastislav of Prešov (born Ondrej Gont), Metropolitan of the Czech Lands and Slovakia since 2014.

=== Archdioceses and archbishops ===
- Archdiocese of Prešov and Slovakia: Metropolitan Rastislav (Gont), Metropolitan of the Czech Lands and Slovakia (since 2014)
- Archdiocese of Prague and the Czech Lands: Michal (Dandár) (since 2015)
- Diocese of Brno and Olomouc: Izaiáš (Slaninka) (since 2024)
- Diocese of Michalovce and Košice: Juraj (Stránský) (since 2007)

=== Vicar dioceses and bishops ===
- Diocese of Beroun: Jachým (Hrdý) (since 2015), vicar bishop of Prague
- Diocese of Šumperk: Izaiáš (Slaninka) (since 2015), vicar bishop of Brno and Olomouc

== Awards ==
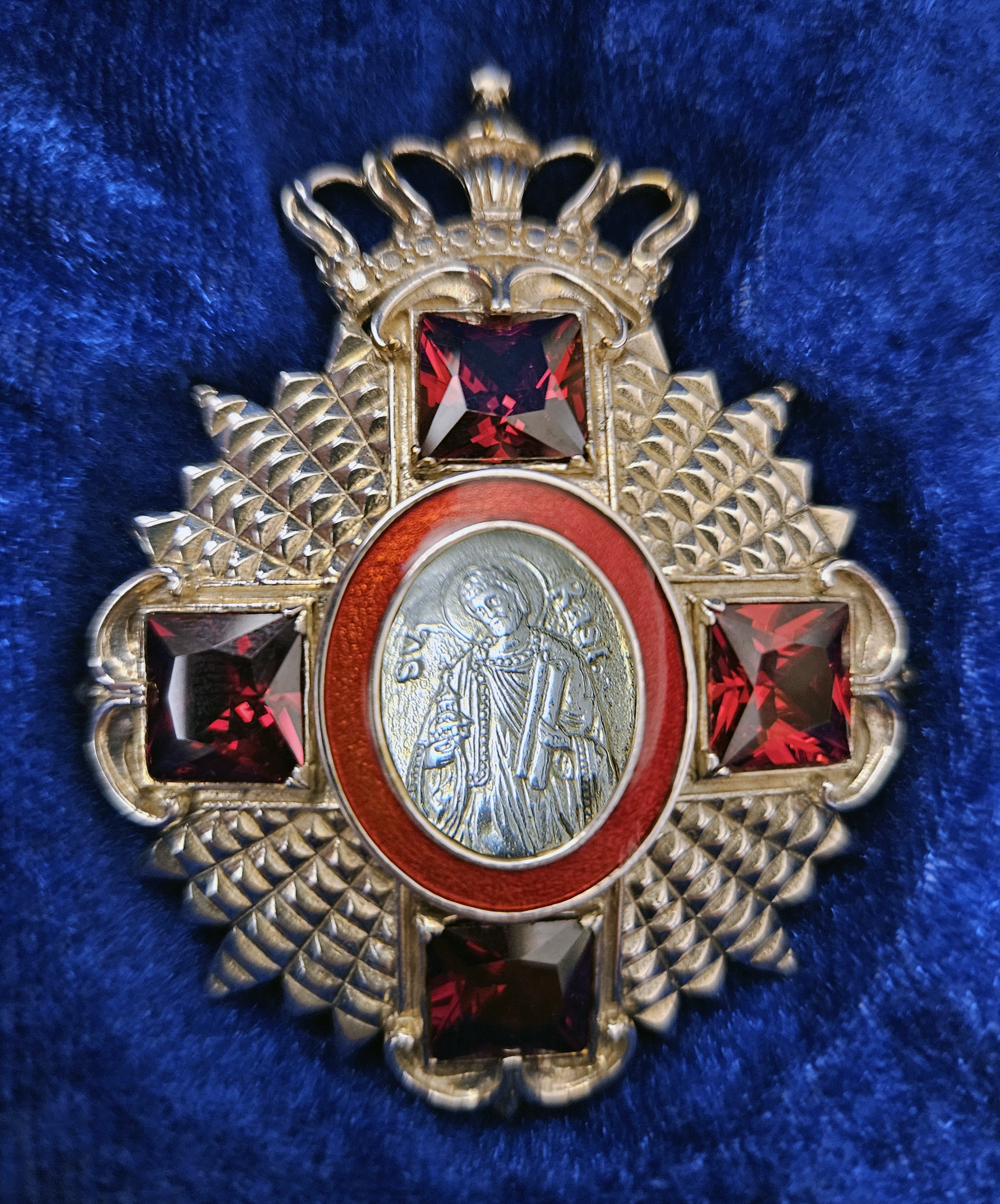
Order of Saint Equal to the Apostles Prince Rastislav of Great Moravia (III grade)

The Orthodox Church of the Czech Lands and Slovakia awards several awards. Among others, they are:

- Order of Saint Ludmila of Bohemia
- Order of Saint Equal to the Apostles Prince Rastislav of Great Moravia
- Medal of Saints Equal-to-Apostles Cyril and Methodius
