= Arnaud (surname) =

- Language: French

Origin
- Region of origin: France

Other names
- Variant forms: Arnold, Arnauld, Arnoul

Arnaud or Arnauld (formerly Arnoul) is the French form of the name Arnold. Arnoul may also have been derived from the related name Arnulf.

It may refer to the following people:

- Arnauld family, a noble French family prominent in the 17th century, associated with Jansenism
- Alice Recoque (née Arnaud) (1929 – 2021), French computer scientist, computer engineer and computer architecture specialist
- Antoine Arnauld (1612–1694), French Roman Catholic theologian, philosopher and mathematician
- Auguste Arnaud (1825–1883), French sculptor
- Davy Arnaud (born 1980), American soccer player
- François Arnaud (actor) (born 1985), French-Canadian actor
- François Arnaud (ecclesiastic) (1721–1784), French clergyman, writer and philologist
- Gabriel Arnaud (1882–1957), mycologist
- Georges Arnaud, a pseudonym for French author Henri Girald (1917–1987)
- Georges-Jean Arnaud (1928–2020), French author
- Henri Arnaud (athlete) (1891–1956), French middle-distance runner
- Henri Arnaud (pastor) (1641–1721), French pastor turned soldier to protect his co-religionists from persecution
- Hortensia Arnaud (1901–?), Argentine dancer, vedette and actress
- Jacques Leroy de Saint Arnaud (1801–1854), French soldier and Marshal of France
- Leo Arnaud (1904–1991), French-American composer, best known for scoring "Bugler's Dream", which is used as the theme for the Olympic Games
- Loris Arnaud (born 1987), French footballer
- Marie-Hélène Arnaud (1934–1986), French model and actress
- Michel Arnaud (1915–1990), French Army general
- Michèle Arnaud (1919–1998), French singer, producer and director
- Ramón Arnaud (1877–1916), last Mexican governor of Clipperton Island
- Simone Arnaud (1850–1901), French poet, playwright, and translator
- Yvonne Arnaud (1892–1958), French-born pianist, singer and actress

== See also ==
- Arnauld
- Françoise Arnoul (1931–2021), French actress
