= Jean Arnauld =

Jean Arnauld was a French philosopher and theologian of the 17th century. He predominantly lived in Reims and most of his work was focused on logic and the failure of reason, the topic for which he is best known. He was unrelated to Antoine Arnauld, although contemporaneous.

== Life ==
Arnauld was born into an influential, deeply cultured family in Reims. The exact date of his birth is unknown, and there is very little biographical written about him. He was born in 1580-1590 and died in 1645–1660. He studied in Paris and began his career there as a private tutor, but soon gave this up.

== Works ==
The works of Arnauld are valuable as an historical source for the criticisms of reason and logic circa 1630; however, these are now presumed lost. None of his works has survived as a whole: there are only small fragments left, mainly due to their being discussed in other works.

- L' Erreur de Logique (The Error of Logic) was published in 1634 in Paris. L' Erreur de Logique is his most widely know book and discusses the failings of logic and how some sense of faith or intuition is sometimes needed to disprove things that have seemingly been proven by logical arguments. It also discusses the way logic is often used to argue things even when the conclusions are actually logical fallacies. However, his precise arguments are not known in full as the text is no longer extant and so all that remains is a summation of his argument and some passages in secondary sources.
- Raison et Dieu (Reason and God) was published in 1640 in Paris.

== See also ==
- René Descartes
