= Giovanni Attilio Arnolfini =

Giovanni Attilio Arnolfini (Lucca, 15 October 1733 – 21 November 1791) was an Italian hydrologist and writer.

He was born in Lucca, where he became senator. He was involved in canals and draining of bogs in Lucca and Tuscany. He was hired by Cardinal Ignazio Boncompagni-Ludovisi to complete some works in Lazio.
