= Saints Cyril and Methodius Cathedral =

Church in Prague

Cyril and Methodius Cathedral
- Pravoslavný chrám svatého Cyrila a Metoděje
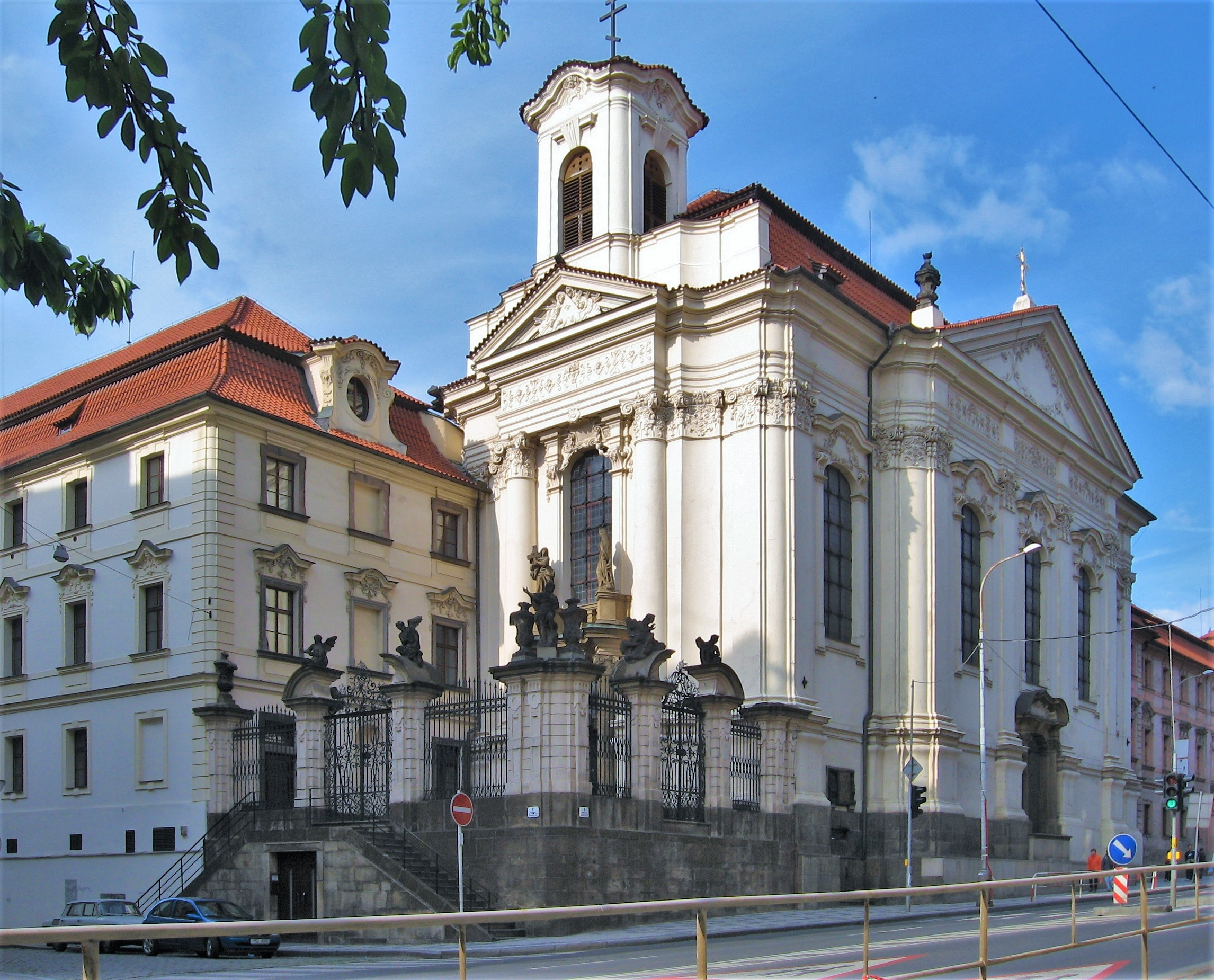

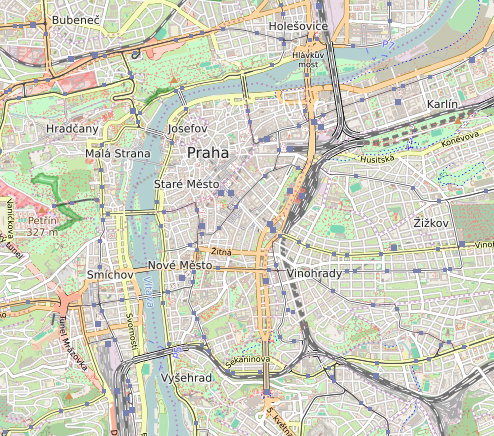
- Location in Central Prague Location in Prague

Religion
- Affiliation: Czech and Slovak Orthodox Church
- District: Nové Město
- Region: Prague
- Leadership: Christopher of Prague
- Patron: Saints Cyril and Methodius

Location
- Country: Czech Republic
- Interactive map of Cyril and Methodius Cathedral
- Coordinates: 50°4′33″N 14°25′1″E

Architecture
- Architect: Kilian Ignaz Dientzenhofer
- Type: Cathedral
- Style: Czech Baroque
- Groundbreaking: 1730
- Completed: 1736
- ÚSKP No.: 44122/1-1221

The Saints Cyril and Methodius Cathedral (Czech: Pravoslavný chrám svatého Cyrila a Metoděje) in Nové Město, Prague, the Czech Republic, is the principal Czech and Slovak Orthodox Church.

== History ==
=== Early history ===
According to oral tradition, the site where Saints Cyril and Methodius Cathedral stands was the site of a small church built by Bořivoj I, Duke of Bohemia, and dedicated by Saint Methodius himself. This link is based historically upon early and continuing reference to the name "Na Zderaze" for the existing church building. In 1091, the Czech lord Zderad was killed during the siege of Brno, and was buried in the earlier church which was near Prague. Zderad's name was then immortalized in the name of the street "Na Zderaze" which is adjacent to the cathedral, thus establishing a connection to this site that was hallowed by St. Methodius.

From 1115, the church of Saints Peter and Paul stood on the site of the present church, around which the Knights of the Cross built the Zderazsky monastery. During the Hussite Wars, the church was largely destroyed, leaving only a part of the choir standing. In 1705, the Roman Catholic Archbishop of Prague, Breuner, established a retirement home for priests on the site of the monastery next to which a church was later built.

The present church was built as the Karel Boromejsky Church between 1730 and 1736 to plans by Kilian Ignaz Dientzenhofer. In 1935 it became the Orthodox Church of Sts Cyril and Methodius.

=== World War II ===
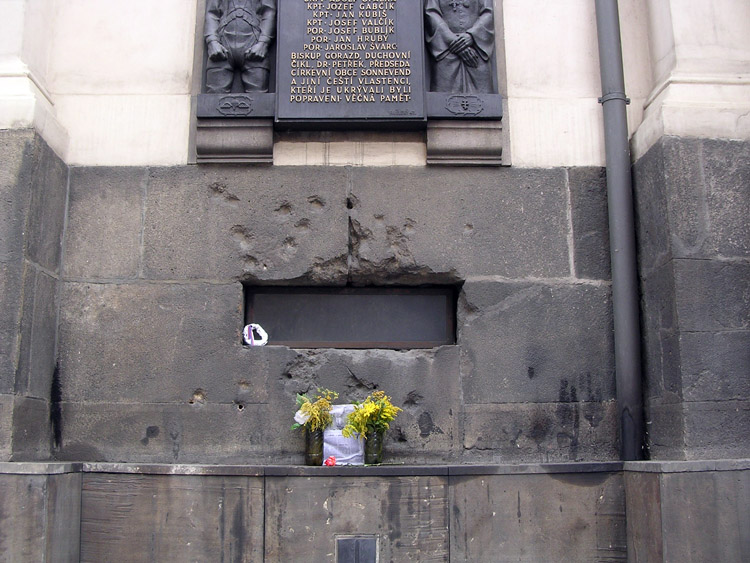
Bullet-scarred window to the crypt

In 1942, during World War II, the cathedral was where a last stand was made by SOE-trained Czech and Slovak agents involved in the assassination of SS-Obergruppenführer Reinhard Heydrich. SS-Brigadeführer Karl Fischer von Treuenfeld commanded the Waffen-SS forces that stormed the church on 18 June 1942. After a fierce gun battle, two of the Czechoslovaks were killed and the rest committed suicide to avoid capture.

There is a museum in the church crypt dedicated to them as national heroes.
