= Olomouc Orthodox Church =

Orthodox church in Olomouc, Moravia, Czechia

Coordinates: 49°35′52″N 17°16′08″E

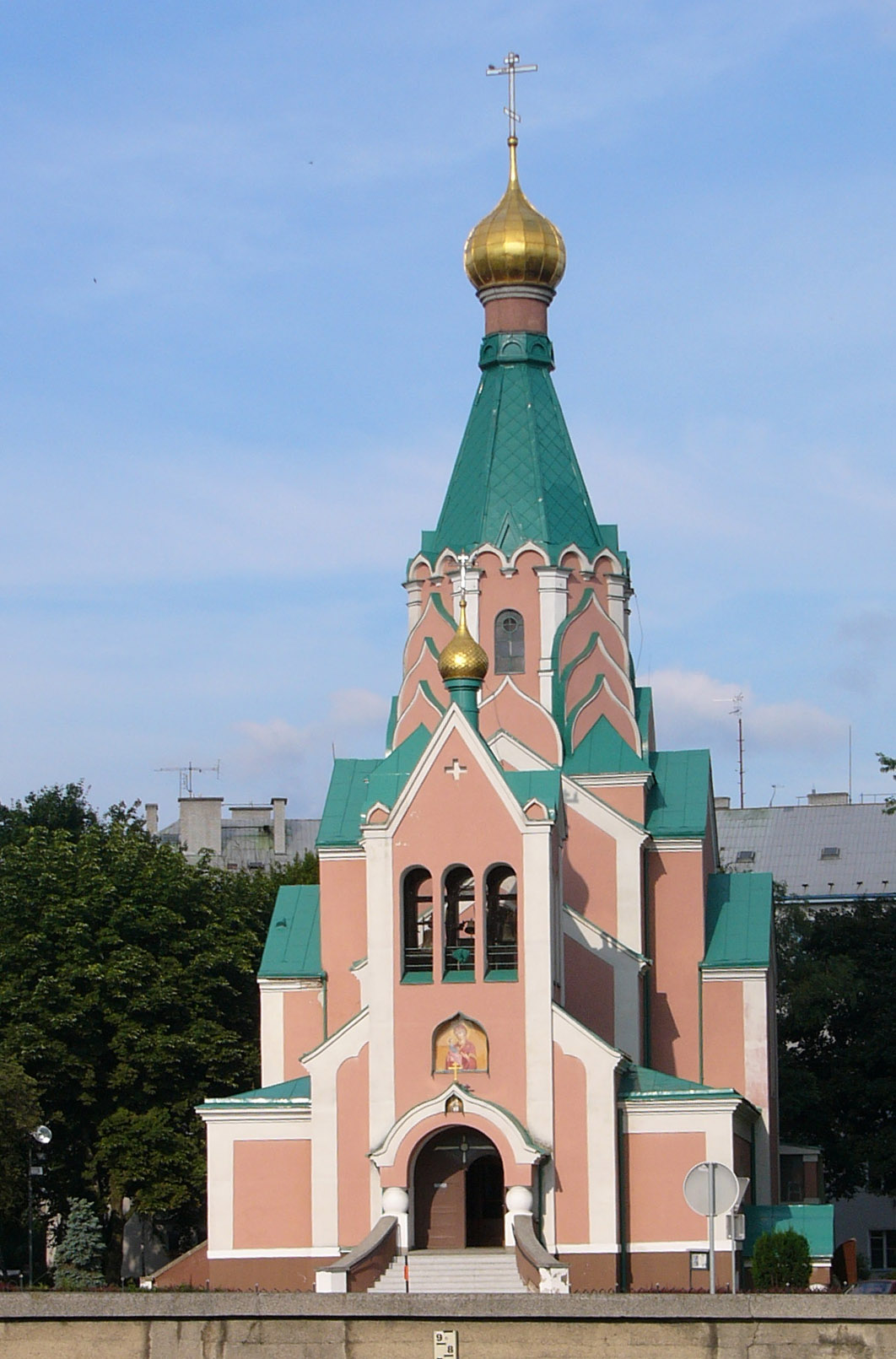
Olomouc Orthodox Church

Olomouc Orthodox Church or Church of St. Gorazd (Czech: Chrám svatého Gorazda) is an Orthodox Christian church in the city of Olomouc in Moravia, in the Czech Republic. It was built and consecrated in 1939 and dedicated to Saint Gorazd (Slavic enlightener in the 9th century). In 1950 it became a cathedral, because Olomouc is the seat of the Olomouc-Brno eparchy.

The church was repaired and renovated during the years of 1985–1987 due to structural deterioration. In 1987, the church saw the canonization of Bishop Gorazd of Prague as St. Gorazd II.

One travel guide recommends that it is "worth seeing just for its striking pink, white and green exterior and three gold onion domes. If it happens to be open, take a peek inside at the icon-filled interior."

== Bishop Gorazd ==
During World War II, Bishop Gorazd (born Matthias Pavlík, 1879) was executed in 1942 for hiding the paratroopers responsible for the death of Nazi official Reinhard Heydrich.
