= Arnulf Solvoll =

Arnulf Solvoll (Chinese: 蘇超生, Pinyin: Sū Chāoshēng; 28 August 1908 – 19 November 2001) was a Norwegian evangelist and missionary associated with the Pentecostal Movement in Norway. He was a missionary in China, Korea, Taiwan and Japan. For his efforts he was awarded the King's Medal of Merit in silver. Solvoll was born and grew up in Westin. He was married to a missionary, Berly Solvoll, from Aarre. He served as an evangelist in Norway for about ten years, between 1928 and 1938, before he traveled as a missionary.

== Missionary life ==
In 1938 Solvoll was sent out along with other missionaries of the Norwegian Pentecostal Outer Mission to the north of China. Solvoll resided most of the time in the areas of Xinbao'an (新保安) and Beijing. Shortly after Mao Zedong declared their seizure of power, all the missionaries were forced to leave China. Arnulf's next stop was Japan, a sunrise country. He later relocated to Taiwan, where he worked for many years and built up a missionary work of radio broadcasts, a home for those patients affected with polio, and social work for prisoners. In 1988, after forty-seven years of continuous service, Solvoll was thanked as a missionary at a party gathering in Bethel. The following year he was awarded the silver King's Medal of Merit for his long contribution to the mission.

== Author ==
Solvoll wrote several books about his experiences as a missionary:

- 1948 -China up close. A missionary's view of China and the Chinese. Philadelphia publishing house. 134 pages.
- 1959 -In the Shadow of Hiroshima light of the gospel. Philadelphia publishing house. 104 pages.
- 1977 -God's plow man among the Chinese.(In collaboration with Jan Kristian Viumdal). Logos 143 pages.
- 1980 -Treasure Hunt.Logos 141 pages. ISBN 82-7067-024-3
- 1989 -A missionary recounts. Philadelphia publishing house. 149 pages. ISBN 82-534-0743-2
- ? 1991 -Memories and Miracles. Rex Publishing, 157 pages.
- 1995 -China up close. Hermon forlag, 160 pages. ISBN 82-7341-411-6

== Literature ==
- Johansen, Oddvar; Hagen, Kjell; Nyen, Astrid Neema; Kolbjørnsrud, Paul and Filberg, Trond. 2010. In all the world. Pentecostal Mission in 100 years. PYM 100 years 1910-2010(anniversary writing) The Norwegian Pentecostal Church (PYM).
- Nilsen, Oddvar. 1982. Light on the path. AS Philadelphia publishing house. Page 150 ISBN 82-534-0599-5
- Red. Pioneer Missionary signing off. Yearbook 1988. Pentecostal Movement in Norway. Page 16 ISBN 82-534-0735-1
