= Fabrician and Philibert =

Saints Fabrician and Philibert

Martyrs
- Died: 3rd century Toledo, Spain
- Honored in: Eastern Orthodox Church; Roman Catholic church
- Feast: 22 August
- Patronage: Toledo, Spain

Saints Fabrician and Philibert (Italian: Fabriziano e Filiberto) are two Christian saints who were martyred for their faith in Christ in Toledo, Spain, sometime in the third century. They are venerated as saints in the Eastern Orthodox Church and Roman Catholic church, being commemorated on 22 August. Little information about them is known.

== Veneration ==
They are particularly venerated in the Archdiocese of Toledo, Spain, following the tradition upheld in the Mozarabic Missal and Breviary in the appendix to the same rite, Cardinal Francisco Jiménez de Cisneros in the years 1500 and 1506.

Their feast is celebrated on the eighth of the Assumption, and their names were not among those collected from Usuardo during his trip to Spain in 858.

The Roman Martyrology edited by Caesar Baronius states that ancient manuscripts and documents relating to him exist in the Church of Toledo. But currently sources documenting the life of these saints are unknown.
