= Christopher of Prague =

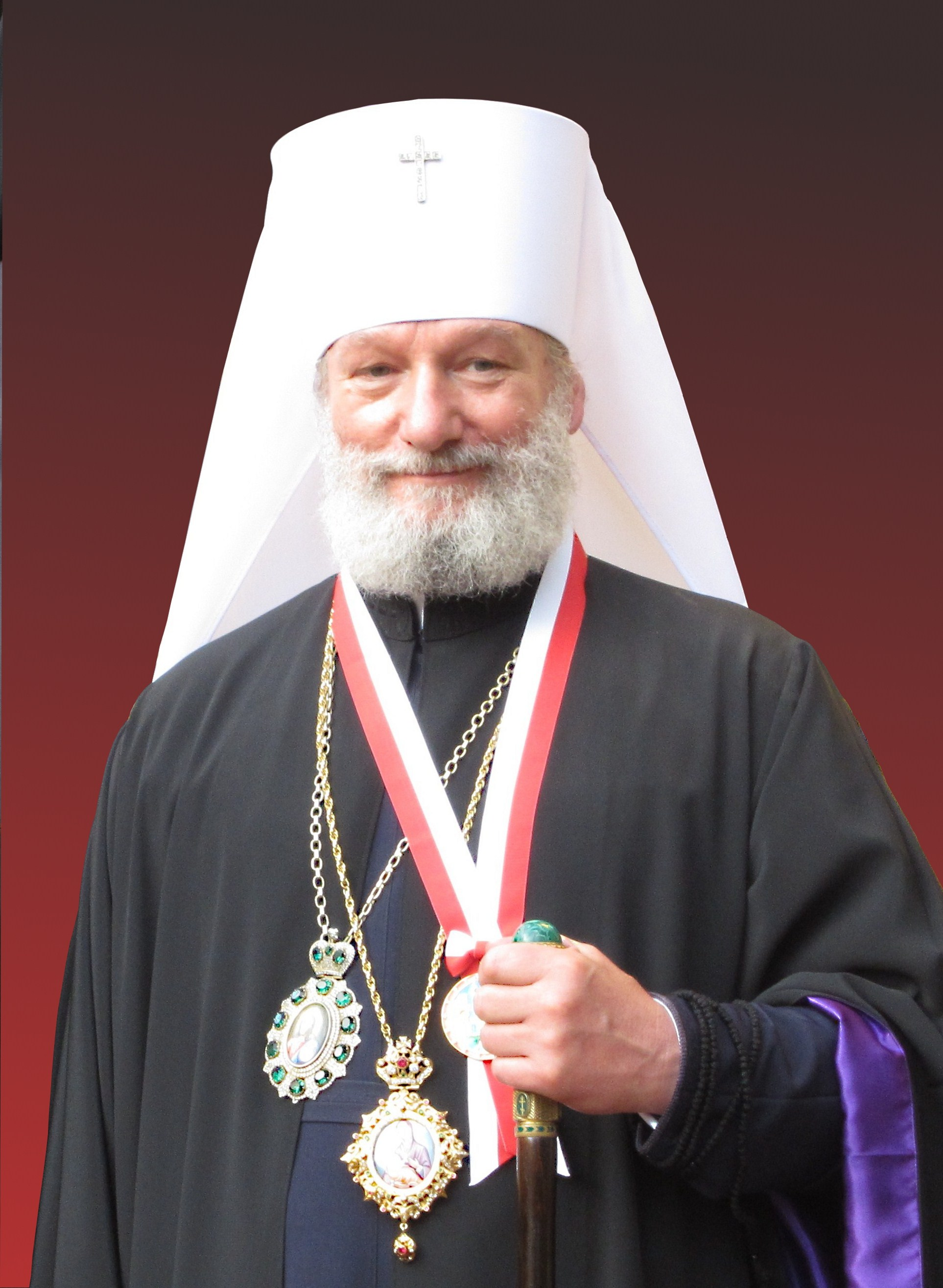
Christopher of Prague, the Orthodox Metropolitan of the Czech lands and Slovakia since 2006 and Archbishop of Prague

Christopher of Prague, born 29 June 1953 as Radim Pulec, was the Orthodox Metropolitan of the Czech lands and Slovakia between 2006 and 2013 and Archbishop of Prague. He has participated in numerous theological conferences and has represented the Church of the Czech Lands and Slovakia in many venues. Fluent in his native language and also Russian, Greek, German and English, he follows academic pursuits in theology and philosophy, having a doctorate in both.

== Biographical timeline ==
- 1953: Radim Pulec born in Prague.
- 1974: Ordained to the diaconate and priesthood.
- 1979: Completed theological studies at the Orthodox Theological Faculty, Presov, Czechoslovakia. Went to Moscow Theological Academy.
- 1984: Completed graduate studies at Moscow Theological Academy.
- 1987: Completed additional theological studies at the Theological Faculty of the University of Athens, Greece.
- 1985: Radim was tonsured at Troitse-Sergiyeva Lavra in Sergiyev Posad (then Zagorsk), Russia, and given the name Christopher.
- 1987: Metropolitan Dorotheus, primate of the Church of Czechoslovakia, elevated Hmk Christopher to archimandrite. Archim. Christopher served at Prague's Cathedral of Sts. Cyril and Methodius.
- 1988: Archim. Christopher was consecrated to the episcopacy, over which Metr. Dorotheus presided, and was elected Bishop of Olomouc and Brno.
- 2000: At repose of Metr. Dorotheus, Bp. Christopher was named Archbishop of Prague and of the Czech Lands, and oversaw the Church's Metropolitan Council.
- 2 May 2006: After repose of Metr. Nikolaj, Abp. Christopher was chosen (by lot of two names) to be Metropolitan of the Czech Lands and Slovakia.
- 28 May 2006: Enthronement of Abp. Christopher took place as Metropolitan of the Czech Lands and Slovakia.
- 12 April 2013: Resignation

== Resignation ==
April 2, 2013. Metropolitan Christopher was accused in Nova television of having sex with women and having children after composition of His monastic vow. Krystof admitted he had two daughters, nevertheless born before he took the oath as a monk.

April 12, 2013. Metropolitan Christopher abdicated to preserve the unity of the Orthodox Church in Czechia and Slovakia. He said he would take legal action to defend His reputation. The Church is temporarily managed by his Excellence bishop Simeon.

April 18, 2013. A lady who accused the Metropolitan Christopher confessed her lying. The lady delivered her official statement to the Bishops of the Church.

April 19, 2013. Orthodox believers called Metropolitan Christopher to His return to the head of the Church.

May 14, 2013. A synod of the Orthodox church held a hearing of other witnesses. The Orthodox bishops then proclaimed the resignation of Metropolitan Christopher was an adequate step. The synod also denied the possibility that he could become a bishop in any eparchy in Czechia or Slovakia. Metropolitan Christopher said he was willing to undergo DNA testing, but he never did.

== Proclamation of Orthodox believers from the Prague Eparchy ==
Based on many prayers and requests of Orthodox believers who ask us, including many priests who do not wish to be named, we would like and we consider our duty as the Metropolitan Office, which is in the middle of these calls, to forward this following proclamation of believers of the Orthodox Church in Czechia and Slovakia.

Prague, 19 April 2013.

We, Orthodox believers Prague Eparchy and believers of our local Orthodox Church in Czechia and Slovakia, consider our duty to express our deep disappointment over the recent events in the Prague Eparchy and the entire local Church concerning the canonical complaint of His Beatitude Christopher in this proclamation. In the same way, we want to demonstrate our disappointment over the progression of this case. We consider without any doubt our statement and we cannot do anything else but bring our dissatisfaction to light and thus submit our disagreement with the solution. At the same time we want to express our starting point how to solve existing situation ...
