= Saint Arnold =

Saint Arnold may refer to:

== People ==
- Arnold Janssen
- Arnold of Arnoldsweiler, also known as Arnoldus, the confessor, and erroneously as Arnold(us), the Greek
- Arnold of Soissons

== Other uses ==
- Saint Arnold Brewing Company

== See also ==
- St Arnulf
- Saint Arnaud (disambiguation), French spelling of the same name
