= Arnulf of Eynesbury =

Saint Arnulf of Eynesbury is an obscure English saint, apparently a hermit who lived in the 8th or 9th century (Alford 1663 quotes a date of death of AD 740). He was venerated in Eynesbury, about half a mile from St Neots, Cambridgeshire, in the 9th century (feast day 22 August).

== Background ==
The name Eynesbury is probably a corruption of Ernulfs-bury and refers to the site where he had his cell, which was destroyed in the Danish invasions in the late 9th century. The saint seems to have been forgotten by the 11th century, as On the resting-places of the saints mentions Saint Neot (feast day 31 July) but not Arnulf.

His historicity is doubtful. He may also have been a folkloristic duplicate of Saint Arnulf of Metz (this supposition is also due to Alford 1663, who notes that the saints' feast days are identical, and who cites a French tradition according to which the remains of Arnulf of Metz were translated to England).

== Sources ==
- R.P. Michaelis Alfordi Annales ecclesiastici et civiles Britannorvm, Saxonum, Anglorum, tomus 2 (1663), p. 553.
- George Cornelius Gorham, The history and antiquities of Eynesbury and St. Neot's, in Huntingdonshire, and of St. Neot's in the county of Cornwall, 1820, 16-19.
