= City municipality of Novi Sad =

City municipality of Novi Sad Градска општина Нови Сад Gradska opština Novi Sad
- Former City municipality
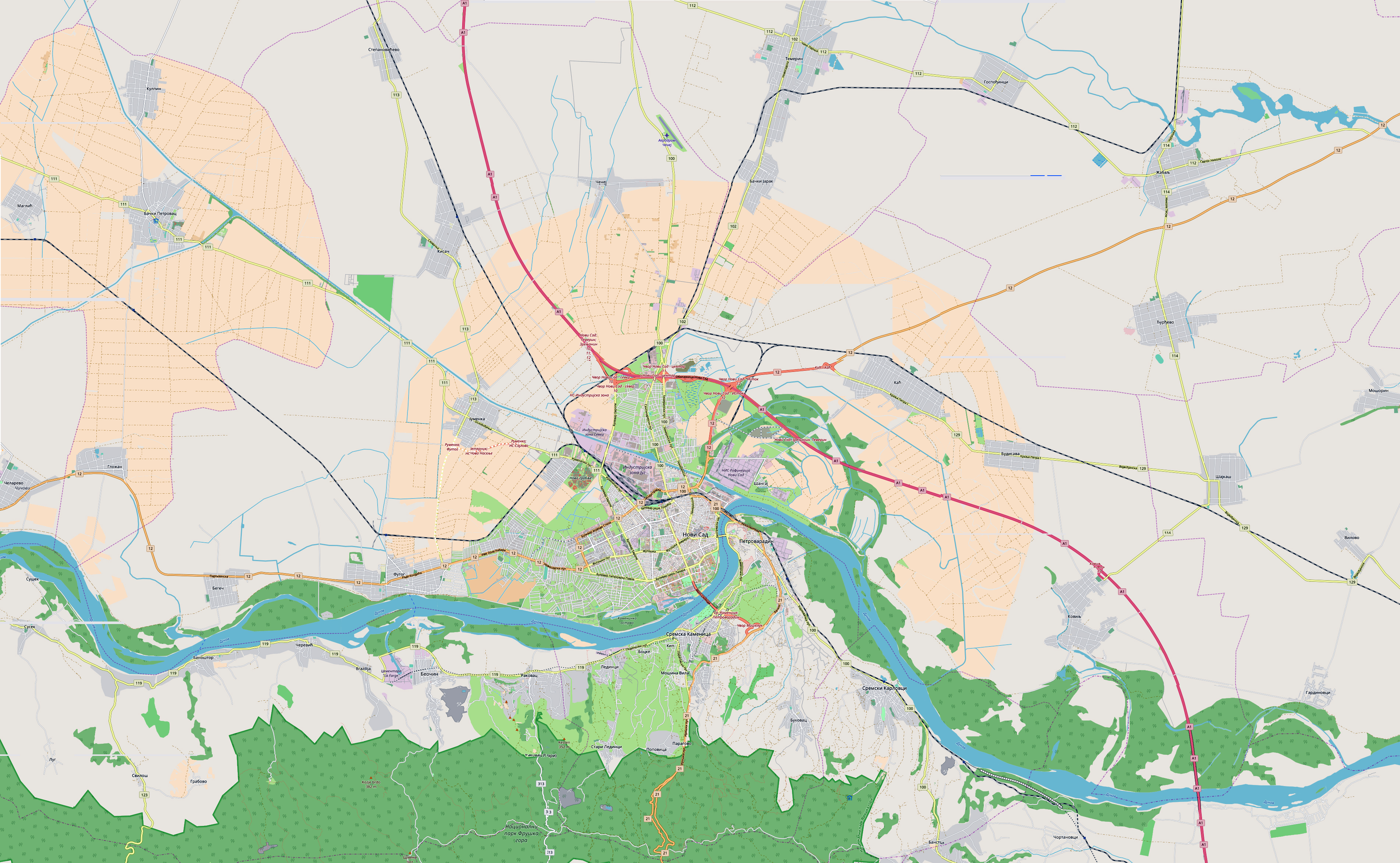
- Location within Novi Sad Location within Vojvodina Location within Serbia Location within Europe
- Coordinates: 45°15′N 19°51′E
- Country: Serbia
- Province: Vojvodina
- District: South Bačka
- City: Novi Sad
- Settlements: 11
- Established: 2002
- Abolished: 2019

Area
  - Urban: 163.89 km^{2} (63.28 sq mi)
  - Municipality: 612.16 km^{2} (236.36 sq mi)

Population (2011)
  - Urban: 250,439
  - Urban density: 1,528.1/km^{2} (3,957.7/sq mi)
  - Municipality: 307,760
  - Municipality density: 502.74/km^{2} (1,302.1/sq mi)

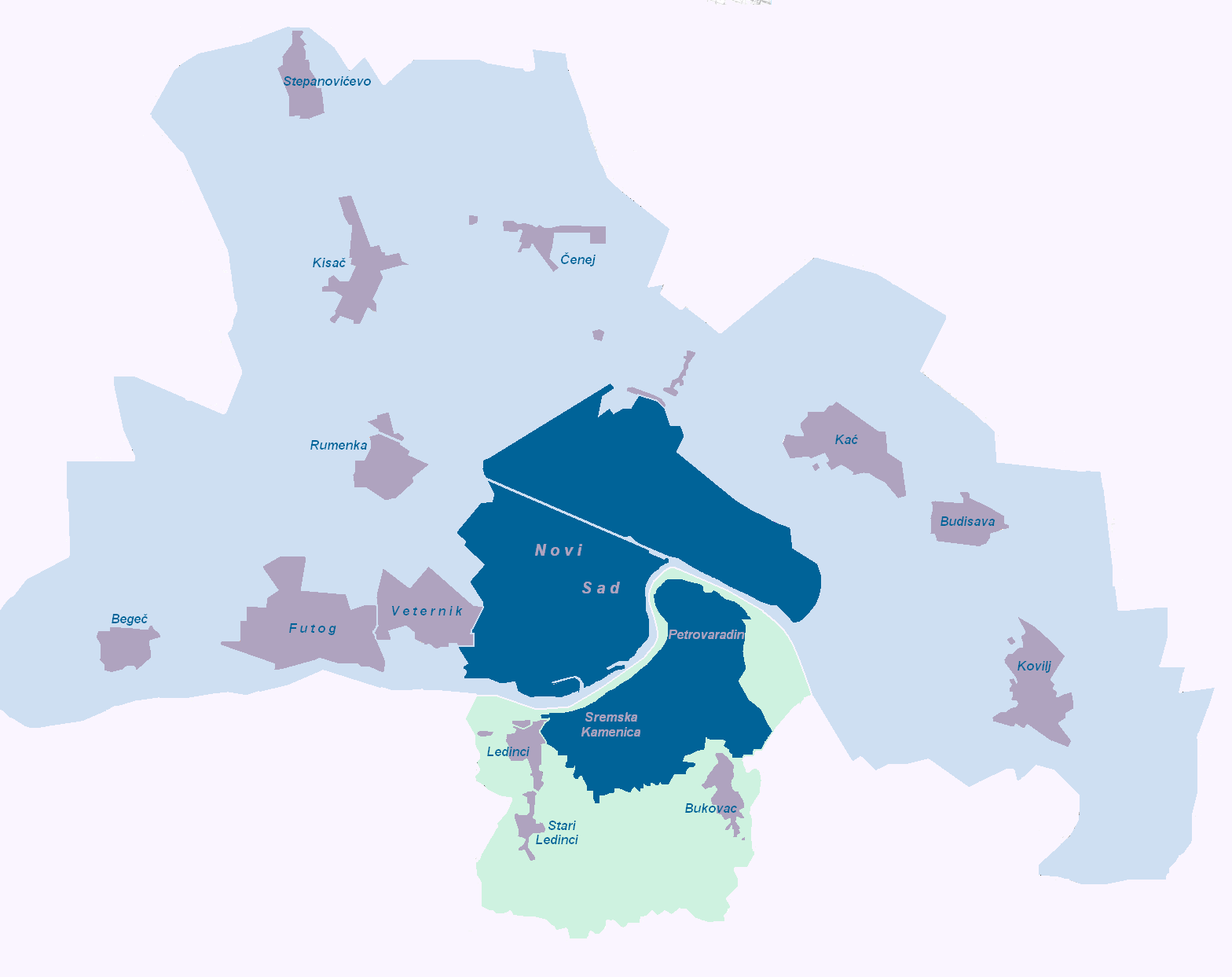
City of Novi Sad: City Municipality of Novi Sad City Municipality of Petrovaradin

The City municipality of Novi Sad (Serbian: Градска општина Нови Сад / Gradska opština Novi Sad) was one of two city municipalities which formerly constituted the City of Novi Sad from 2002 to 2019. The city statute adopted in 2019 abolished both of Novi Sad's city municipalities. According to the 2011 census results, the municipality had a population of 307,760 inhabitants, while the urban area had 250,439 inhabitants.

== Names ==
There were names in several languages that could be used for this municipality: Serbian: Градска општина Нови Сад, romanized: 'Gradska opština Novi Sad; Hungarian: Újvidék városi község; Slovak: Mestská Obec Nový Sad; Rusyn: Городска Oпштина Нови Сад.

== Politics ==
When the 2002 statute of the city of Novi Sad came into effect, Novi Sad was divided into two city municipalities, Petrovaradin and Novi Sad. From 1989 until 2002, the name Municipality of Novi Sad meant the whole territory of the present-day city of Novi Sad.

The city municipalities of Novi Sad were established in 2002 solely to allow Novi Sad to get city status under the then-standing law. Under the new Constitution of Serbia (from November 2006), a city doesn't have to be divided into municipalities to get city status. Therefore by a new city statute adopted in 2019, both of the city municipalities were abolished, and Novi Sad's city government now runs the whole city.

== Geography ==
The City Municipality of Novi Sad was situated in the southern part of the Bačka region. The total area of City of Novi Sad was 699 km², and the area of the city municipality was 671.8 km². The municipality laid in one of the southern lowest parts of the Pannonian Plain. Alluvial plains along Danube are well-formed, especially on the left bank, in some parts 10 km from the river. A large part of Novi Sad municipality was on a river terrace with elevation of 80-83 m.

== Settlements ==
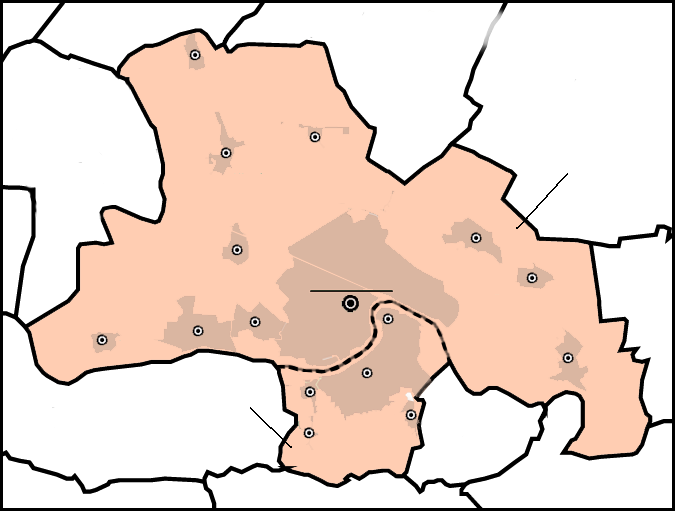

The city municipality included 11 settlements:

- Novi Sad proper (the Bačka side of the urban area of Novi Sad City)
- Begeč
- Futog
- Veternik
- Rumenka
- Kisač
- Stepanovićevo
- Čenej
- Kać
- Budisava
- Kovilj

== Ethnic groups ==
According to the 2011 census, the total population of the territory of the former Novi Sad municipality was 307,760, of whom 241,789 (78.56%) were ethnic Serbs.

== Cultural heritage ==
There is a Serbian Orthodox Kovilj Monastery in the former municipality. It is situated near the village of Kovilj. The monastery was reconstructed in 1705-1707. According to legend, the monastery was founded by the first Serb archbishop Saint Sava in the 13th century.

== See also ==
- Municipalities of Serbia
