= Aksentije Marodić =

Serbian painter

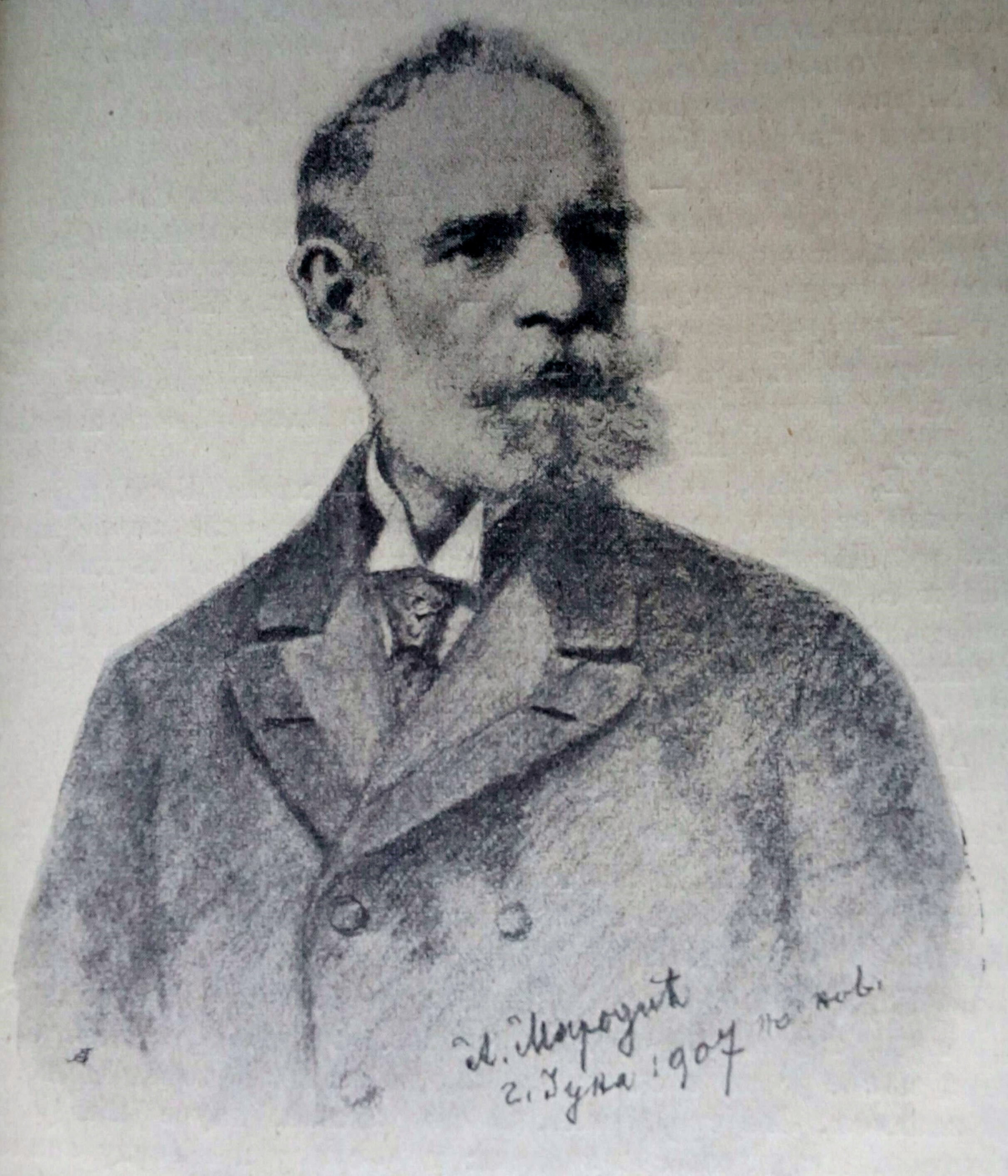
Aksentije Marodić

Aksentije Marodić (Subotica, Serbia, 20 February 1838 – Novi Sad, Serbia, 20 March 1909) was a Serbian academic painter from Vojvodina.

== Biography ==
He was born in Subotica, the son of Maksim, a tailor, and Ljubica Marodić. He was an apprentice of painter Petar Pilić in Senta in 1851–55, then of Nikola Aleksić in Novo Miloševo. While receiving many orders from the leading citizens in Subotica, he also worked for the Serbian Orthodox Church; he restored the Bunarić church icons in 1857. The next year he moved to Bečej, where he made acclaimed portraits and painted the church of baroness Jović in 1861. He studied painting in Vienna at the Academy of Fine Arts until 1866, thanks to benefactors from Subotica and Bečej and also the municipal government of Subotica. He then lived and worked in Italy, and upon his return published travelogues in the magazines Zastava and Javor in 1874. His work was influenced by the Italian masters that he studied. Josip Juraj Strossmayer, particularly, valued his work. Marodić was elected member of the Matica srpska literary department in 1883. He lived and worked in Kovilj until 1903, then in Novi Sad. His most accomplished work was the iconostasis in the Kovilj monastery. He was buried in the Dormition cemetery in Novi Sad.

Marodić was the first academic painter from Subotica and a representative of academicism and romanticism in Serbian painting in the second half of the 19th century. His birth house is a designated cultural heritage of Serbia classified as a Cultural Monument of Great Importance. A large number of his works are exhibited in the gallery of Matica srpska, of which 32 works are donated by the Bačka Gallery in Subotica.

A street in Subotica bears his name.

== See also ==
- List of painters from Serbia
