= Sankt Ignatios College =

Swedish inter-Orthodox Christian school

- Södertälje, Sweden

Information
- School type: Offers inter-Orthodox education and priest training with postgraduate studies.
- Motto: Religion, peace and democracy through education
- Established: 2018

Sankt Ignatios College is an inter-Orthodox Christian educational institution in Sweden. The college provides education and training for those called to service in the Orthodox Churches. The college is based in Södertälje, Sweden.

== History ==
The college came into being in 2018 through a collaboration between Sankt Ignatios Folkhögskola and Stockholm School of Theology, (University College Stockholm). Students who are preparing for ministry in the churches receive courses and instruction at both the Folkhögskola and university levels.

The education at Folkhögskola level involves foundational theological, biblical and vocational courses, especially those focused on the Orthodox Church traditions. At the Stockholm School of Eastern Christian Studies, students undertake postgraduate programs leading to a Master's degree in Eastern Christian Studies. The (full) professors in the college include Samuel Rubenson and Cyril Hovorun.

In 2014, Gabriel Bar-Sawme, who would later become a lecturer at the college, collaborated with indie developer Simon Yildiz to create an iOS app named Mele which taught western Classical Syriac (kṯoḇonōyō) in the form of a quiz. As of April 2026, the app is no longer available.

== The seminaries ==
All students in Sankt Ignatios College are enrolled in one of the four seminaries representing the major Orthodox traditions in Sweden. The Byzantine (Greek and Slavic) Orthodox Seminary; The Coptic Orthodox Seminary; The Syrian Orthodox Seminary; The Tewahedo (Eritrean and Ethiopic) Orthodox Seminary. The seminaries serve as a contact between the students and the Church traditions they belong to, as well as providing accommodation for the students during their study time. They are based in Södertälje where the majority of teaching takes place.

== See also ==
- Sankt Ignatios Foundation
