= Sankt Ignatios Foundation =

Inter-orthodox christian ecumenical foundation

Sankt Ignatios Foundation is an inter-Orthodox Christian ecumenical and education organisation in Sweden. The foundation represents a collaboration between four Orthodox traditions, the Byzantine (Greek and Slavic), the Syriac, the Coptic and the Tewahedo (Eritrean-Ethiopian).

Through Sankt Ignatios College and Sankt Ignatios Folkhögskola, the Foundation provides education and training both for men and women seeking to serve in the Orthodox churches as priests deacons and educators and also a basic upper school level education for people who have recently moved to Sweden who lack the necessary qualifications to find employment. The Folkhögskola emphasises the importance of education for enabling people to play their full part in society.

The Foundation also awards the Order of Sankt Ignatios each year to someone who has made a significant contribution to the life or understanding of the Orthodox Church.

The motto of the Foundation is "Religion, peace and democracy through education and learning".

== History ==
The story began in the 1990s when the Byzantine (Greek and Slavic) and the Syriac Orthodox Churches were invited to appoint a joint representative to the Christian Council in Sweden. They realized that they had to work together more closely than they had done before and that to do so they needed education to help them to learn about one another and to work together more effectively. They turned for help to the Swedish christian educational organization Bilda.

Eventually the churches decided that they needed their own body to provide education and training and to stimulate inter-Orthodox cooperation and in 2012 they established the Sankt Ignatios Foundation.

Soon after its inauguration, the Foundation established Sankt Ignatios Folkhögskola and then in 2018, through a collaboration with the Stockholm School of Theology (University College Stockholm) it established Sankt Ignatios College. The College took over the responsibility for providing education and training for ministers, priests and educators and is unique in Sweden in offering education at both Folkhögskola and University levels.

The Foundation sponsors research and scholarship in the area of Eastern Christian Studies and was one of the founding members of the International Orthodox Theological Association.

== Order of Sankt Ignatios ==
A fundamental part of the mission of Sankt Ignatios Foundation is to recognize outstanding contributions to Orthodoxy. Every year it awards the Order of Sankt Ignatios to those men and women who have made the most significant contributions through their leadership and scholarship. Recipients of the Order receive a medal and a diploma describing their contribution.

=== List of recipients ===
Year	Recipient
2012–13	Kerstin Enlund, Study Association Bilda och Murat Posluk, Syriac Orthodox Church
2014–15	Pope Tawardros II, Pope of Alexandria and patriarch of the See of St. Mark; Moran Mor Ignatius Aphrem II, Patriarch of Antioch and All the East
2016	Porfirije, Metropolitan of Zagreb and Ljubljana, Serbian Orthodox Church
2017	Suriel, Coptic Orthodox Bishop of Melbourne
2018	Professor Sebastian Brock
2019	Professor Emeritus Andrew Louth
2020	Professors Aristotle Papanikolaou and George Demacopoulos, Fordham University
2021	Professor Susan Ashbrook Harvey
2022	Professor Ugo Zanetti

== Democracy Project ==
One of the aims of the Foundation is to contribute from a Christian Orthodox perspective to the development of democracy and civic participation in Sweden. As part of the fulfillment of that aim the Foundation sponsors a democracy project which involves the creation of educational materials for use in schools, colleges and community groups and the publication of a book. The present project is called the Space of Uncertainty and is focused on the contribution of Hannah Arendt to the understanding of how fascism undermines freedom and democracy. This project is being developed in collaboration with Paideia Folkhögskola in Stockholm.

== Structure ==
The Foundation has a management board which includes representatives from the four Orthodox Traditions listed above. The day to day decisions about policy are made by the Executive Committee which makes decisions concerning the management of the Folkhögskla and college.

== See also ==
- Sankt Ignatios College
