= Porfirije, Serbian Patriarch =

Patriarch of the Serbian Orthodox Church since 2020

His Holiness Porfirije
- Archbishop of Peć, Metropolitan of Belgrade and Karlovci, and Serbian Patriarch
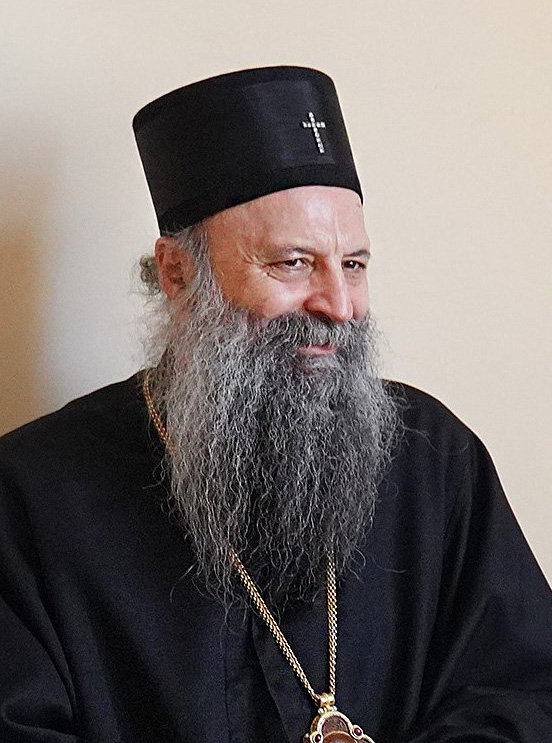
- Porfirije in 2021
- Church: Serbian Orthodox Church
- See: Belgrade
- Installed: 19 February 2021
- Predecessor: Irinej

Orders
- Ordination: 21 April 1985
- Consecration: 13 June 1999

Personal details
- Born: 22 July 1961 Bečej, SR Serbia, Yugoslavia
- Denomination: Eastern Orthodoxy
- Signature: Porfirije's signature

Styles of Serbian Patriarch Porfirije
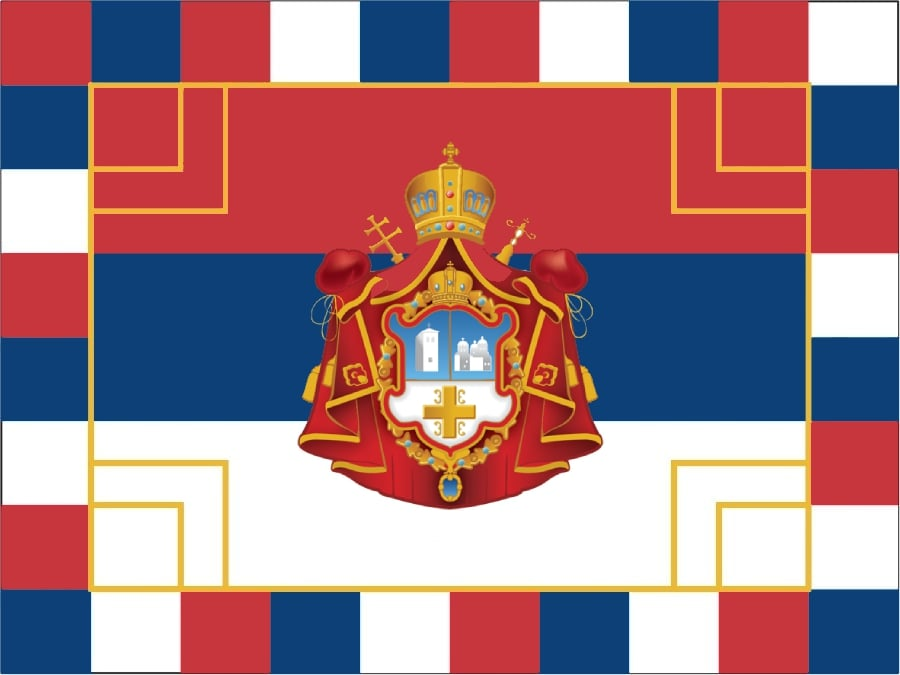
- Reference style: His Holiness
- Spoken style: Your Holiness
- Religious style: Patriarch

Porfirije (Serbian: Порфирије, English: Porphyry; born Prvoslav Perić; born 22 July 1961) is the incumbent and 46th Patriarch of the Serbian Orthodox Church.

== Early life and education ==
Prvoslav Perić was born on 22 July 1961, in Bečej, FPR Yugoslavia (now in Serbia), to Radivoje (1935–1993) and Radojka (1942–2023) Perić. His family ancestry lies in Derventa, Bosnia and Herzegovina.

Prvoslav completed elementary school in Čurug, and the Jovan Jovanović Zmaj Gymnasium in Novi Sad. He was tonsured a monk at the Visoki Dečani Monastery on 21 April 1985, receiving the monastic name of Porfirije after Saint Porphyrios of Kafsokalyvia.

In 1986, Porfirije earned his Bachelor's degree in Eastern Orthodox theology from the University of Belgrade. He was subsequently ordained a hierodeacon at the Holy Trinity Monastery in Mušutište, Kosovo, by then Bishop Pavle (Stojčević) of Raška and Prizren (later Patriarch). Porfirije undertook postgraduate studies at the National and Kapodistrian University of Athens from 1986 to 1990. He later earned a doctorate from the same university in 2004, with the thesis Possibility of Knowability of God in St. Paul's Understanding According to the Interpretation of St. John Chrysostom. After earning a doctorate, Porfirije became a docent at the University of Belgrade Theological Faculty's Department of Catechetic and Pastoral Theology, later becoming an associate professor in 2015. As a professor, Porfirije has taught introductory studies in Pastoral Theology with Psychology and New Testament Theology, as well as in other subjects within the postgraduate and doctorate programs.

Porfirije speaks Serbian, Greek, English, German, and Russian.

== Hegumen of Kovilj Monastery ==
On 6 October 1990, with the blessing of Bishop Irinej Bulović of Bačka, Porfirije joined the brotherhood of the Kovilj Monastery near Novi Sad. On 21 November 1990, he was ordained as a hieromonk and became Hegumen of the monastery. As a result, many young monastics and novices came to the monastery, following him. At this point in time, Kovilj Monastery was a significant spiritual center for many young people: intellectuals, artists, actors, and rock musicians, especially from Novi Sad and Belgrade. Since then, Porfirije has particularly supported patients with drug addictions.

== Titular Bishop of Eger ==
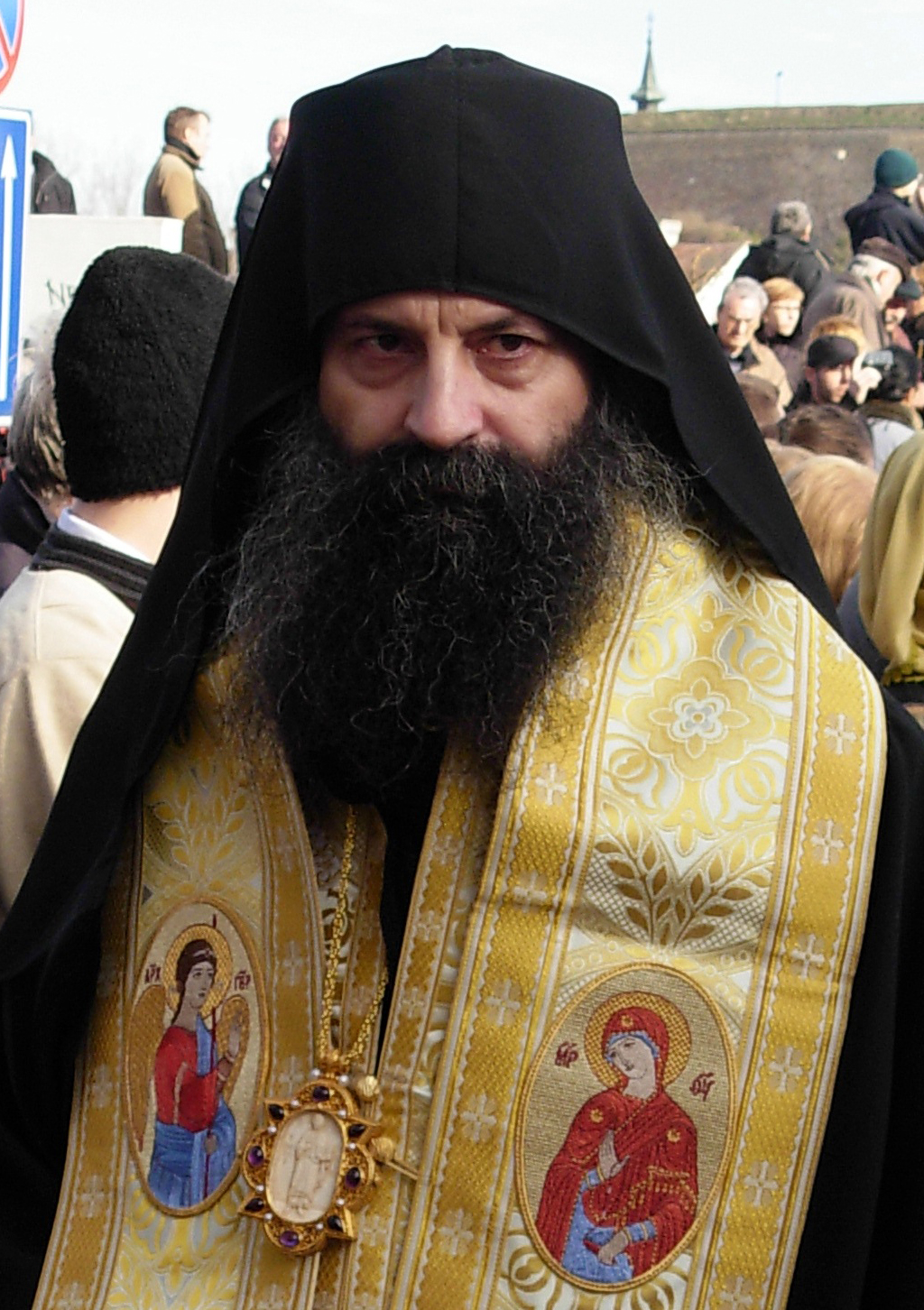
Bishop Porfirije attending the 70th anniversary of the Novi Sad raid, 2012

On 14 May 1999, the Council of Bishops of the Serbian Orthodox Church elected Porfirije as vicar-bishop of the Eparchy of Bačka, receiving the titular see of Eger. In 2005, Porfirije formed a therapeutic community called Zemlja živih (transl. The Land of the Living), which is recognized as a successful project for drug rehabilitation. Under the leadership of Porfirije, it currently has more than a hundred participants in residences throughout Serbia. In 2010, the Council of Bishops entrusted Porfirije to establish a military chaplaincy in the Serbian Armed Forces. He was the official military chaplain until 2011, whereupon he became a coordinator for cooperation between the Serbian Orthodox Church and the Serbian Armed Forces.

In 2005, the Parliament of Serbia, standing as a representative of all churches and religious communities in Serbia, elected Porfirije as a member of the Council of the Republic Broadcasting Agency (Republička radiodifuzna agencija; now known as the Electronic Media Regulatory Authority (Regulatorno telo za elektronske medije)). On 29 July 2008, Porfirije was elected as the Chairman of the Council, succeeding Nenad Cekić. In 2010, the Electronic Media Regulatory Authority demanded from TV Pink the censoring of profanity on the reality show Farma. Speaking on the issue, Porfirije mentioned that the profanity escalated so excessively that the Council was resolved to unconditionally and immediately take action, without waiting for the end of the show's production. In 2011, he criticized reality television and advocated for a ban of the live broadcasting of reality television. Later, there was similar issue with another TV Pink-produced reality show, Dvor (transl. The Palace). Following his election as Metropolitan of Zagreb and Ljubljana in May 2014, Porfirije resigned as Council Chairman.

== Metropolitan of Zagreb and Ljubljana ==
In May 2014, Porfirije was elected Metropolitan of Zagreb and Ljubljana, succeeding Jovan (Pavlović). He was formally enthroned on 13 July 2014, at the Cathedral of the Transfiguration of the Lord in Zagreb, Croatia.

On 16 February 2016, the Sankt Ignatios Foundation awarded him with the Order of Sankt Ignatios, presenting him with the Medal in Stockholm, Sweden. The award recognised "his contribution to the reconciliation of the people in the Balkans and his dedicated work on promoting unity among Christians". In June 2016, Porfirije released a book titled Zagreb i ja se volimo javno (transl. Zagreb and Me are Openly in Love), namely, in the city of Zagreb. The book contains transcripts of various interviews from July 2014 to February 2016, which he gave as Metropolitan to various media and news outlets, including Politika, Jutarnji list, Večernji list, RTS, HRT, RTV Slovenija, and RTRS.

Metropolitan Porfirije of Zagreb in 2015

In 2016, Porfirije attended a gathering of Serbian clergy in Chicago, United States, where he was filmed singing a patriotic song dedicated to the Chetnik commander Momčilo Đujić. This drew criticism from the Croatian public, prompting Porfirije to apologize for this act; explaining that he did not have "influence to all circumstances," and that "certain media manipulated this event." He additionally stated that "feelings of deep sadness and regret are also caused by those who, consciously or unconsciously, are contributing to the outpouring of intolerance towards the Serbian people these days, as well as to the deepening of the gap between Croats and Serbs."

Between 2017 and 2020, Porfirije hosted meetings of Zagreb-based intellectuals who discussed social, ethical, and political topics. Held at the Serbian Orthodox Gymnasium in Zagreb, the meetings were colloquially known as Porfirijevi kružoci (transl. Porfirije's Circles). Significant participants included Ivo Josipović, Rada Borić, Vili Matula, Tvrtko Jakovina, Dejan Jović, Dražen Lalić, Milorad Pupovac, among others.

As part of his episcopal ministry, Porfirije acted as a member of the Holy Synod of the Serbian Orthodox Church from 2017 to 2019. In January 2019, the Association for Religious Freedom in Croatia awarded Porfirije on the occasion of the 25th anniversary of its founding, recognising his peaceful contribution to the promotion of dialogue and religious freedoms. When Patriarch Irinej fell ill in 2019, Porfirije was seen as one of the main candidates for the position of the next Serbian Patriarch.

During his post as Metropolitan, Porfirije tried to "build bridges" between Serbs and Croats. He served as a visiting professor at Roman Catholic theology faculties and established good relations with high-ranking members of the Catholic clergy.

Following his enthronement as Serbian Patriarch, Porfirije acted as Locum tenens of the Metropolitanate of Zagreb and Ljubljana until the election of a succeeding Metropolitan. Subsequently, in May 2023, Bishop Kirilo Bojović of Buenos Aires, South America, and Central America was elected for the post.

In his first interview as the Serbian patriarch, delivered to the Croatian Radiotelevision, Porfirije stated that he experienced the departure from Croatia with a certain sadness, and, commenting on his post as Metropolitan of Zagreb and Ljubljana, he jokingly recounted that he is the Patriarch of Belgrade, Zagreb, and Ljubljana - that is, of Serbs, Croats, and Slovenes.

== Serbian Patriarch ==
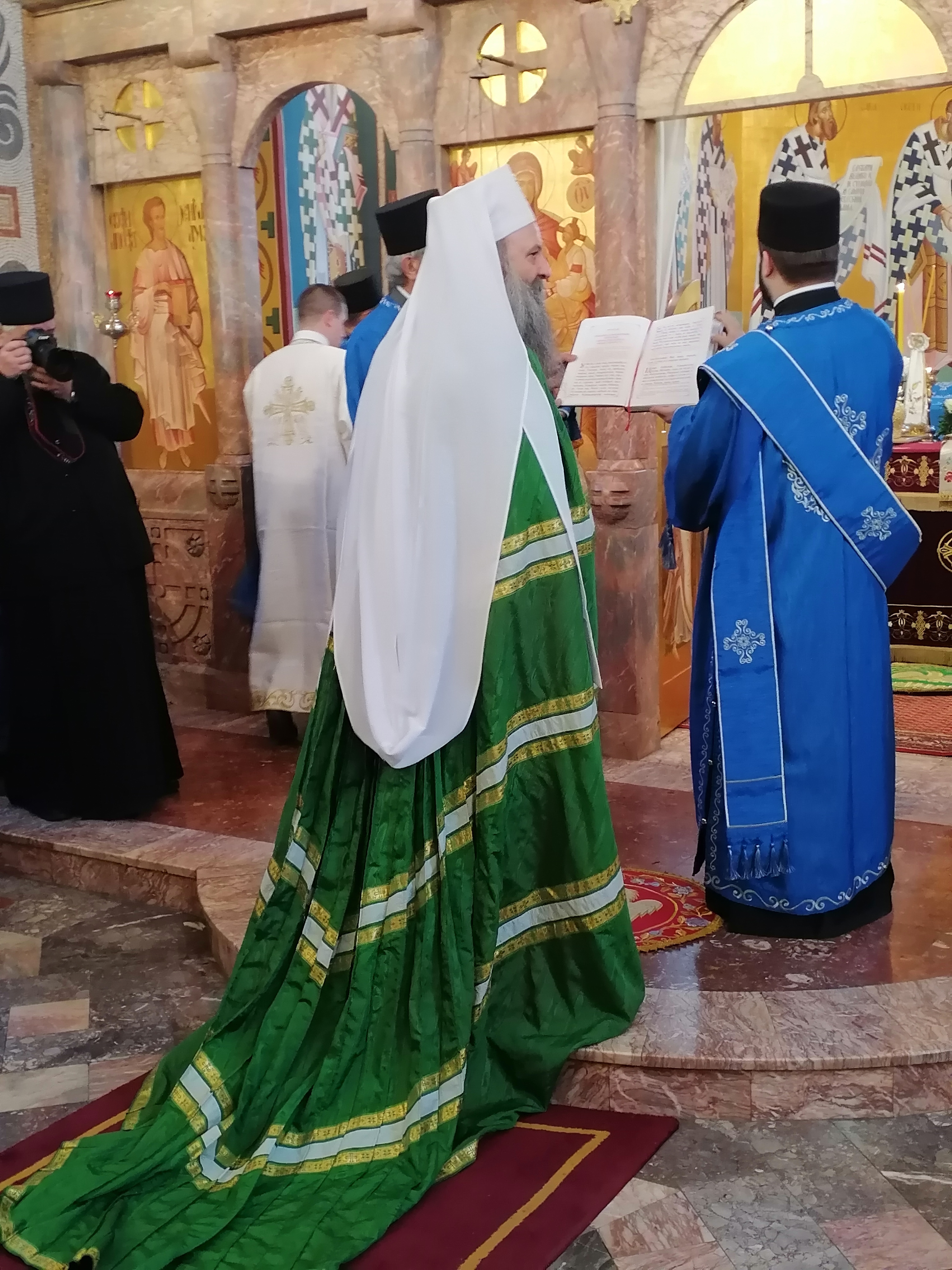
Patriarch Porfirije at the service in the Church of Saint Luke in Belgrade, 2021

Three months after the death of his predecessor, Patriarch Irinej, on 18 February 2021, Porfirije was elected as the 46th Serbian Patriarch by the Council of Bishops convocation at the Church of Saint Sava. With 31 out of 39 votes, he was the first of three leading candidates, alongside Bishop Irinej of Bačka who won 30 votes, and Bishop Jefrem of Banja Luka, who won 24 votes.

In the final phase of counting votes, the ballot paper with his name was drawn from the Holy Gospel, by the hand of Archimandrite Matej of Sisojevac Monastery. In this way, the Serbian Orthodox Church professes the Patriarch is elected by divine intervention, sidelining human interests.

As one of the youngest bishops at the time of his election, Porfirije is the youngest Serbian Patriarch elected since 1937.

Congratulatory letters on the occasion of his election were sent by Ecumenical Patriarch Bartholomew I of Constantinople, Patriarch Theodore II of Alexandria, Patriarch Kirill of Moscow, Patriarch Neophyte of Bulgaria, Patriarch John X of Antioch, Patriarch Daniel of Romania, and Archbishop Anastasios of Albania. Additionally, the Montenegrin President Milo Đukanović, who publicly held the belief that Montenegro needs to have its own Orthodox Church in order to strengthen its national identity and oppose interference from Serbia, sent his congratulations upon election.

Porfirije was enthroned on 19 February 2021 at the Cathedral of the Archangel Michael in Belgrade. Patriarchal insignias were handed to him by Metropolitan Hrizostom of Dabar and Bosnia and Bishop Lukijan of Buda. In his inaugural speech, Porfirije focused on unity and peace-building. He stated that Kosovo is kept in his prayers, and the Serbs in the affected Kosovo will be held closely to his heart. Porfirije further stated that Croatia has become his second homeland, and the people he met there will remain a role model for him in the years to come.

The enthronement ceremony was attended by representatives of churches and religious communities within Serbia, and numerous Serbian government ministers and politicians, including Serbian President Aleksandar Vučić; Milorad Dodik, the Chairman and Serb-representative member of the Presidency of Bosnia and Herzegovina; Željka Cvijanović, the President of Republika Srpska (Serb-majority entity of Bosnia and Herzegovina); Apostolic Nuncio Luciano Suriani; Archbishop Stanislav Hočevar, the Catholic archbishop of Belgrade; Effendi Mustafa Jusufspahić, the Mufti of Serbia; and many other dignitaries such as Prince Filip Karađorđević, a member of the House of Karađorđević.

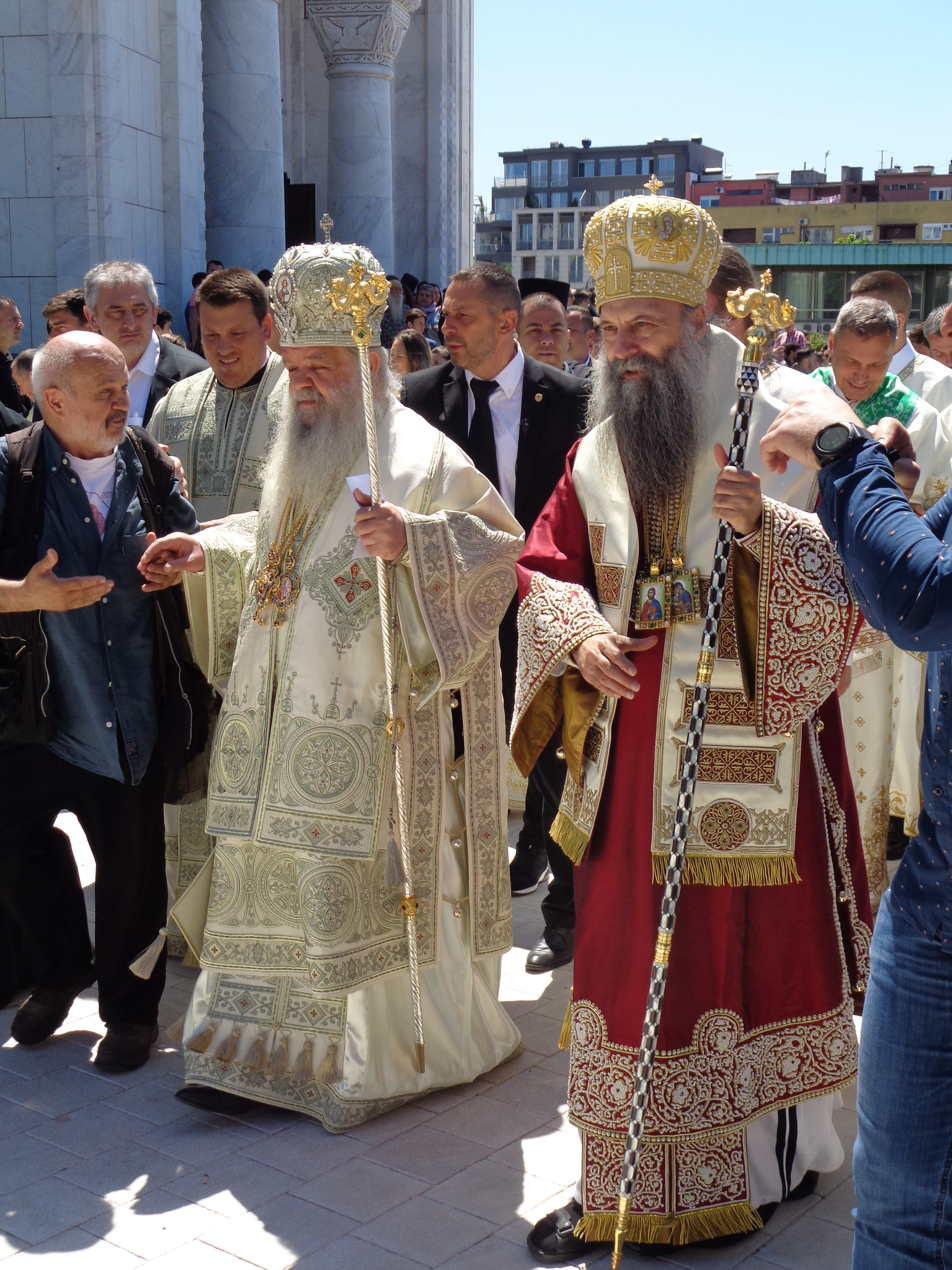
Patriarch Porfirije and Archbishop Stefan, primate of the Macedonian Orthodox Church, after a concelebrated liturgy at the Church of Saint Sava, marking the recognition of the Macedonian Orthodox Church's autocephaly by the Serbian Orthodox Church, 2022

Porfirije held his ritual enthronement to the ancient throne of the Serbian Patriarch, in the Patriarchate of Peć Monastery, on 14 October 2022. This came five months after the initial planned date; postponed due to epidemiological measures enforced in Kosovo and Metohija.

On 25 February 2021, Porfirije met with Serbian President Vučić. After the meeting, he confirmed that he is not a politician, but rather professes that the Serbian Orthodox Church is "a conciliator organism which has the goal to collect, build bridges, dull blades and overcome polarization". Two days later, as his first pastoral visit, Porfirije visited Majske Poljane and Glina, areas affected by the 2020 Petrinja earthquake, meeting with the local community. On 3 March 2021, Porfirije ended in a self-isolation after being in close contact with a COVID-19-positive individual. In the following months, however, he met with numerous foreign diplomats in Belgrade, including the ambassadors to Serbia of Britain, the United States, Austria, Belarus, Belgium, Bulgaria, Cyprus, Greece, Hungary, Italy, Israel, Romania, Russia, and Ukraine, as well as Cypriot Foreign Affairs Minister Nikos Christodoulides. In November 2021, Porfirije called for religious education to receive the status of a compulsory elective subject.

On the occasion of the Islamic holiday Eid al-Fitr in May 2021, Porfirije expressed his aspiration to participate in building relations between Orthodox Christians and Muslims.

Porfirije tested positive for COVID-19 on 11 January 2022.

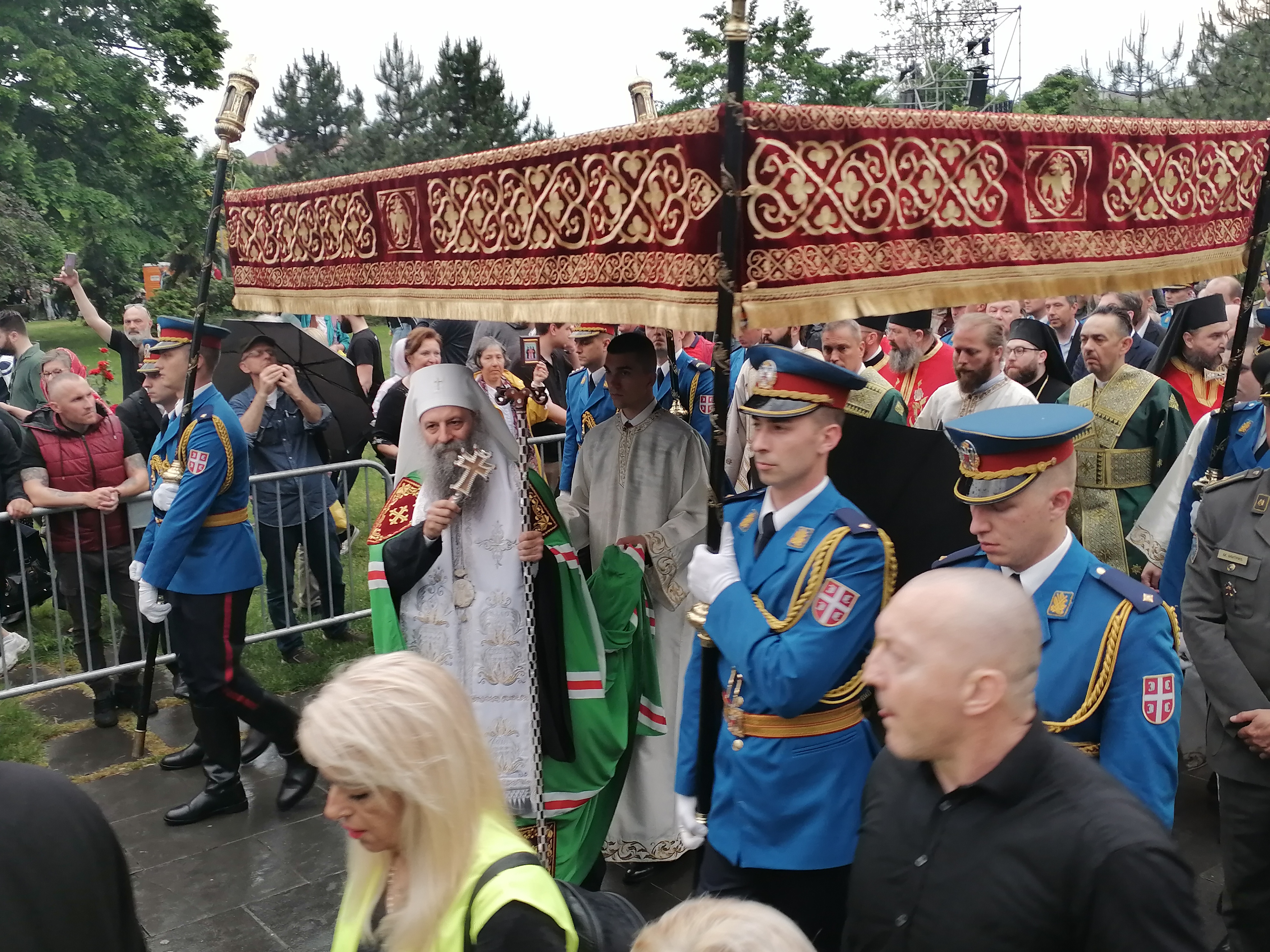
Patriarch Porfirije at the Feast of the Ascension procession in Belgrade, 2023

On 16 May 2022, the Holy Synod of Serbian Orthodox Church released a statement confirming the resolve of the situation involving the Macedonian Orthodox Church, ending a schism with the Serbian Orthodox Church that had lasted from 1967. The Holy Synod stated that full ecclesiastical autonomy was restored to the Archbishopric under the Patriarchate of Serbia, bringing the Macedonian Orthodox Church fully into communion with the wider Eastern Orthodox world. On 24 May 2022, during a liturgy between hierarchs of both the Macedonian Orthodox Church, including its primate Archbishop Stefan; and the Serbian Orthodox Church in Skopje, Porfirije announced to the faithful that "the Holy Synod of the Serbian Orthodox Church has unanimously met the pleas of the Macedonian Orthodox Church and has accepted and recognized its autocephaly."

On 26 December 2022, Porfirije was denied entry at the Merdare administrative border crossing point after he attempted to visit the Patriarchate of Peć Monastery. In response, the Serbian Armed Forces placed armored vehicles and artillery at the nearby Jarinje crossing. The Serbian Minister of Internal Affairs, Bratislav Gašić, announced that in accordance with orders given by president Aleksandar Vučić, he had ordered full combat readiness of police forces, the Gendarmery, and the Special Anti-Terrorist Unit.

In October 2026, Porfirije made a historic inaugural visit to the Serbian Orthodox Metropolitanate of Australia and New Zealand, ministering to Serbian Orthodox clergy and faithful in Melbourne, Canberra and Sydney. Porfirije was accompanied by an entourage of Serbian Orthodox clergy; including Metropolitans Hilarion of Timok and Arsenije of Niš; Bishops Sergije of Bihac-Petrovac and Isihije of Valjevo; Archimandrite Danilo, Director of the Administrative Office of the Serbian Orthodox Church; Protodeacon Dragan Radić, Hierodeacon Teodosije, Deacon Vasilije Perić, and Subdeacons Dejan Nakić and Vladimir Jelić. The visit was marked by several festive liturgical celebrations and civil occasions, including the consecration of a church in Keysborough, Victoria, the consecration of a chapel in the diocese's only Orthodox school in Varroville, New South Wales, and solemn doxologies and celebrations in parishes and monasteries across Australia. On 12 October, Porfirije was received in the Australian Parliament, greeted by the Speaker of the House of Representatives, Milton Dick; Ambassador Rade Stefanović from the Serbian embassy in Australia; and other senators and community representatives. In the visit, Ambassador Stefanović recalled that this was the third visit of a Serbian primate to Australia, preceded by Patriarchs Pavle (in 2004) and Irinej (in 2016).

== Stances ==
=== Domestic politics ===
In March 2025, amid widespread student protests following the Novi Sad railway station canopy collapse, Porfirije made controversial statements calling for students to return to classrooms and universities. His remarks, which critics interpreted as support for the government of Aleksandar Vučić, sparked significant backlash on social media and were seen by many as evidence of the Serbian Orthodox Church's alignment with the governing authorities. The Patriarch's position during the protests was viewed as particularly contentious, given the public's outrage over the government's handling of the tragedy, which resulted in the death of 16 people.

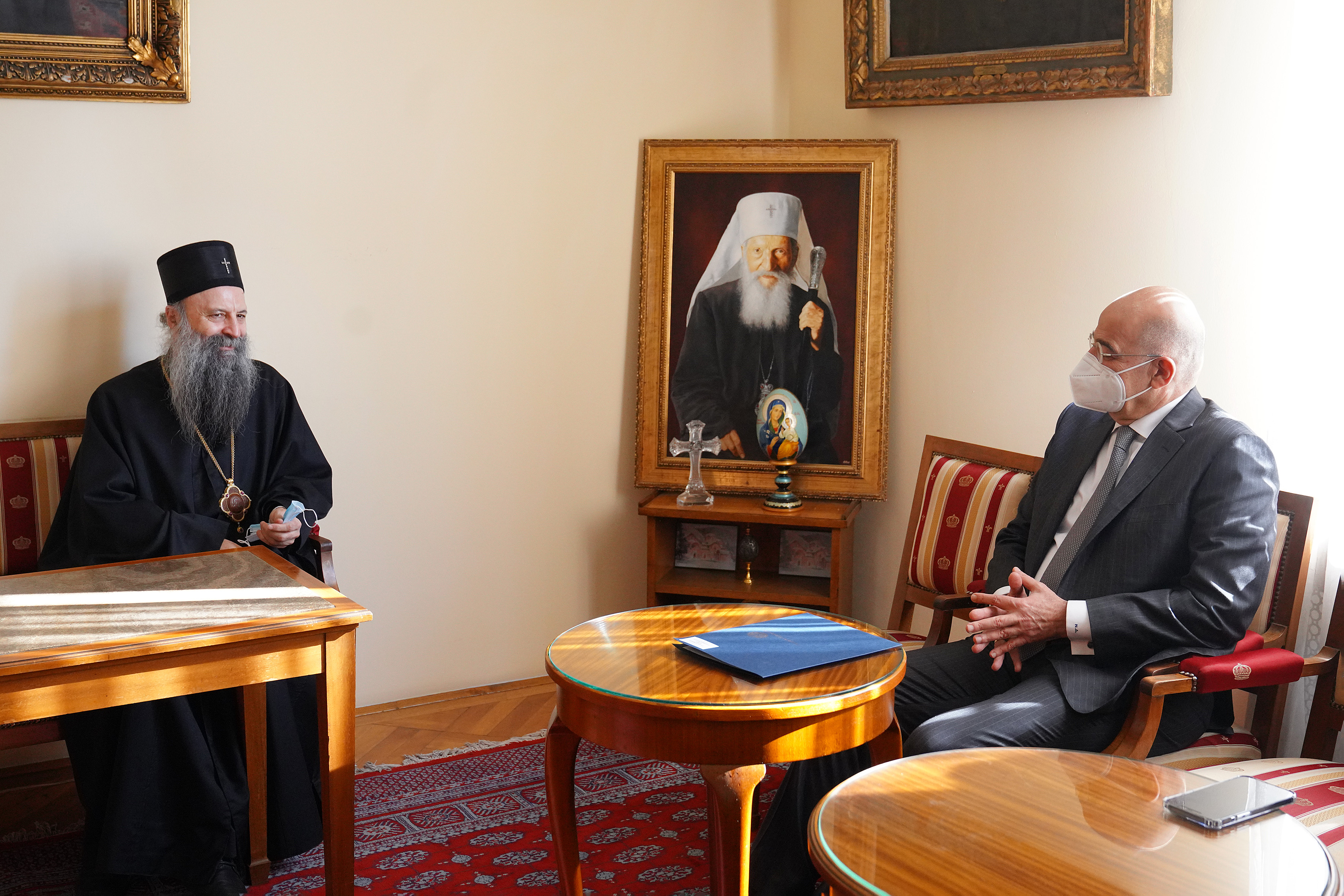
Patriarch Porfirije with Foreign Minister of Greece, Nikos Dendias, 2021

In April 2025, Porfirije visited Moscow, meeting with Russian President Vladimir Putin alongside Patriarch Kirill of Moscow. During their meeting, held on April 22, Porfirije described the ongoing student protests in Serbia as a "color revolution" orchestrated by Western powers, stating that "centres of power from the West do not wish to nurture the identity of the Serb people or their culture." He also expressed that Serbia's positions on Kosovo, Republika Srpska, and Montenegro depend on Russia's global stance. The visit drew criticism from theologians and political analysts who accused Porfirije of serving the interests of Vučić's government rather than the Serbian Orthodox Church.

Porfirije presided over the 2026 funeral service of former Bosnian Serb general and convicted war criminal Ratko Mladić. During the service, Porfirije praised Mladić as a commander who "led his army through a tragic historical period", stating that his name would remain deeply woven into the memory and prayers of the Serbian Orthodox people, who "feel and nurture a deep sense of gratitude towards him". This high-profile officiation, which took place alongside state and military officials, drew international condemnation for glorifying a convicted genocide orchestrator.

=== Kosovo ===
In March 2021, Porfirije stated that the disputed territory of Kosovo was and remains part of Serbia and that "the referendum about it took place in 1389", referring to the medieval Battle of Kosovo, as well as Serb cultural and spiritual heritage in Kosovo. In May 2021, he met with Serbian Minister of Justice Maja Popović to improve cooperation with the Ministry of Justice in order to protect the heritage of the Serbian Orthodox Church in Kosovo, as well as a social and material position of monasticism.

=== Ukraine ===
In February 2022, Porfirije announced that the Serbian Orthodox Church would be sending help to Orthodox Christians in Ukraine. All donations collected would be sent to the Ukrainian Orthodox Church (Moscow Patriarchate) and its Metropolitan Onufriy, who would help deliver them where needed; it was noted that he excluded the Orthodox Church of Ukraine and its Metropolitan Epiphanius of Kyiv, and avoided mentioning the Russian invasion.

== Awards and honours ==
- Recognition of the Association for Religious Freedom in Croatia, 2019
- Order of Sankt Ignatios, Sankt Ignatios Foundation, 2016
- Grand Diploma of Vladimir Matijević, Privrednik, 2022
- Order of the Holy New Martyrs, Eparchy of Bihać and Petrovac, 2024
- Order of St. Equal to Apostles Prince Vladimir, Russian Orthodox Church, 2025
- Honorary Doctor of Theology, Moscow Theological Academy, 2025

== Works ==
Books

- Licem k licu: Biblijsko-pastirska promišljanja o Bogu, čoveku i svetu (transl. Face to Face: Biblical-Pastoral Reflections on God, Man, and the World), 2015
- Zagreb i ja se volimo javno (transl. Zagreb and Me are Openly in Love), 2016
- Premudrost u Tajni sakrivena – Ogledi iz Teologije apostola Pavla (transl. Wisdom is Hidden in the Secret – Essays in the Theology of Paul the Apostle), 2020

Articles

- E ágápe õs sýndesmos ginóskontos kaí ginoskoménoy, 2011
- Kosovo je naš krst (transl. Kosovo is Our Cross), 2012
- Pastirsko prisustvo crkve u srpskom narodu tokom Prvog svetskog rata (transl. The Pastoral Presence of the Church among the Serb people during the World War I), 2015
- Pavlovo poimanje pravednosti Božje u tumačenju Svetog Jovana Zlatoustog (transl. Paul's Understanding of the Righteousness of God in the Interpretation of St. John Chrysostom), 2019
- Misionarski i pastirski rad Svetoga Save (transl. Missionary and Pastoral Work of Saint Sava), 2019
- Eshatologija apostola Pavla: poslanice Solunjanima i Korinćanima (transl. The Eschatology of Paul the Apostle: Epistles to the Thessalonians and Corinthians), 2020
- Antropologija Svetog Apostola Pavla (transl. Anthropology of Saint Paul the Apostle), 2020

== See also ==
- List of heads of the Serbian Orthodox Church
- List of current Christian leaders
- List of current popes and patriarchs
- List of 21st-century religious leaders

Eastern Orthodox Church titles
Preceded by Irinej	Serbian Patriarch; 2021–present	Incumbent
Preceded by Jovan Pavlović	Metropolitan of Zagreb and Ljubljana; 2014–2021	Vacant
New title	Titular Bishop of Eger; 1999–2014	Succeeded by Jeronim Močević
