= Titular Bishop of Eger =

Titular bishop of the Serbian Orthodox Church

The Titular Bishop of Eger (Serbian: викарни епископ јегарски, romanized: vikarni episkop jegarski) is a titular bishop of the Serbian Orthodox Church, who also serves as the vicar bishop for the Bishop of Bačka. The see of bishop is at the Kovilj Monastery near Novi Sad. The titular bishop is a member of the Council of Bishops of the Serbian Orthodox Church.

== History ==
Established in 1999, the titular bishop bears the title of the old Eparchy of Eger (named after the Hungarian city Eger), which was the northernmost eparchy of the Serbian Patriarchate of Peć. The eparchy was abolished in 1713, and its territory was annexed to the Eparchy of Bačka, whose bishop bore the title "Bačka, Szeged, and Eger".

== List of bishops ==
No.	Portrait	Titular Bishop (born–died)	Reign	Reason of withdrawal	Ref.
1		Porfirije Perić (born 1961)	13 June 1999 – 26 May 2014 (14 years, 11 months)	Elected Metropolitan of Zagreb and Ljubljana	
2		Jeronim Močević (1969–2016)	May 2014 – November 2016 (2 years, 6 months)	Died	
3		Nektarije Samardžić (born 1983)	27 November 2022 – May 2024 (1 year, 6 months)	Elected Bishop of Great Britain and Ireland	

== See also ==
- Eparchies and metropolitanates of the Serbian Orthodox Church
