= Kovilj Monastery =

Monastery in Serbia

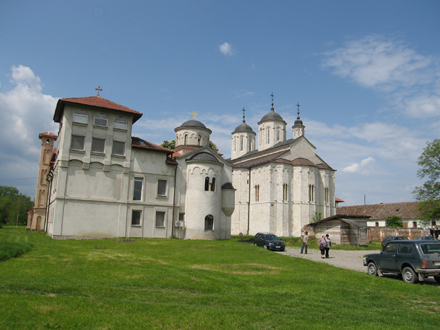
- Interactive map of Kovilj Monastery

Monastery information
- Order: Serbian Orthodox
- Established: 13th century Renovated in 1705–1707
- Dedication: Archangels Gabriel and Michael (26 July)
- Diocese: Eparchy of Bačka
- Controlled churches: 1

People
- Founder: Saint Sava

Site
- Location: Kovilj, Novi Sad, Bačka, Vojvodina, Serbia
- Coordinates: 45°12′49″N 20°02′04″E

The Kovilj Monastery (Serbian: Манастир Ковиљ, Manastir Kovilj) is a 13th-century Serb Orthodox monastery in the Bačka region, in the northern Serbian province of Vojvodina. According to the legend, the monastery was founded by the first Serb archbishop, Saint Sava, in the 13th century. The monastery, often cited as one of the most beautiful, has been nicknamed the "Jewel of Bačka". Considered "one of the most monumental cultural-historical objects in Bačka", it is protected by the state since 1949 as a cultural monument.

== Location ==
The monastery is located near Kovilj, a suburban village of Novi Sad. It is situated just south of the village at the point where the Special Natural Reserve "Koviljsko-Petrovaradinski Rit" begins, a wetland in the valley of the Danube, stretched along its left bank. The Monastery Kovilj is in the western section of Šajkaška, a historical region of south Bačka.

== History ==
=== Origin ===
In 1217, Serbian ruler, Grand Župan Stefan the First-Crowned was crowned the King of Serbia by the papal legate. King Andrew II of Hungary, angered by the fact that the ruler of Serbia is now equal to him and considering Serbia its vassal, decided to attack Stefan. In 1220, Andrew II encamped at the location of modern Kovilj, which at the time was the territory of Hungary. Saint Sava, brother of Stefan, arrived and began diplomatic talks to prevent the war and managed to reconcile two kings.

According to tradition, to commemorate the event, Saint Sava founded the monastery in 1220, and dedicated it to the Saint Archangels Gabriel and Michael. Turkish traveller Evliya Çelebi, who visited the region in the 17th century, wrote that the monastery was founded by the "Serbian king, the owner of Belgrade", which would be King Stefan Dragutin, who was the only mediaeval Serbian king who ruled Belgrade, 1284-1316. Some theories claim that the monastery was built on the ruins of the Franciscan monastery from 1421. None of these theories can be confirmed in historical documents.

=== Hungarian and Austrian period ===
Kovilj was mentioned for the first in the Munich Serbian Psalter from the 14th century. It was mentioned as having a "joint properties" with the Privina Glava Monastery, which indicates that Kovilj was originally a metochion of Privina Glava. Later sources mention the "old wooden church", which was painted with frescoes in 1651. During the wars between the Austria and Ottoman Empire in the second half of the 17th century, the Ottomans demolished the monastery and burned the church on four occasions from 1686 to 1697. After the Treaty of Karlowitz in 1699, the surviving monks restored the old church, with the help from the other monks and people which settled in the area from the other parts of Hungary, while the monastery was renovated in 1705-1707.

The present, stone church was built from 1741 to 1749 by the neimars (builders) Teodor Kosta and Nikola Krapić. It was built in the Morava architectural school style of Serbo-Byzantine architecture and patterned after Manasija (to which it especially resembles) and Ravanica. In 1758, Empress Maria Theresa issued a document which set the monastery's estate. By the imperial privilege, the land was strictly divided between the monastery and the nearby settlement of Koviljski Šanac. The imperial gramata confirmed monastery's ownership over some 1,000 ha (2,500 acres) of land.

The establishment of the Šajkaš Battalion in 1763, Serbian settlements surrounding the monastery were repopulated and preserved, which also influenced the prosperity of the monastery. Forerunner of the modern Serbian historiography, Jovan Rajić, became a priest in Kovilj and was appointed the archimandrite of the monastery in 1772, where he died in 1801. During the Hungarian Revolution of 1848, the rebels used the monastery as their base in 1849 which forced the monks to move across the Danube, into the Syrmia region. When they returned after the collapse of the rebellion, the monastery was looted and burned, and many historical treasures were lost. All objects within the monastery were burned. The new church was damaged inside while the old one was almost completely ruined, so it was demolished in 1850. Since 1850, the monks began to collect funds for the restoration. Some of it was secured by the Austrian state, some by the donations of the population, and some was help from Russia. Young painter Aksentije Marodić painted the new iconostas in the 1880s, including the scenes from the life of Christ and replicas of the most famous paintings from that period which Marodić copied from the galleries in Vienna, Munich, Paris, Rome, Venice, and Naples. The walls themselves are not painted. Woodworks and carvings are the work of Jovan Kisner, while the gold plating and marble work were done by Ludvig Tauš. The work on the interior turned out to be quite lengthy, as it lasted until 1891/92.

=== Yugoslavia and Serbia ===
The monastery wasn't damaged during World War I. After the partial agrarian reform in the Kingdom of Yugoslavia, the estate of Kovilj was reduced, and in 1933 it became a female monastery. The Hungarian occupational forces looted the monastery in 1941, during World War II, and some artifacts are today still being exhibited in several museums in Budapest. They also expelled the nuns, which moved to the Fenek Monastery, but when Ustaše forced them out from Fenek, too, they settled in the Monastery of Saint Petka, near Paraćin, in central Serbia. After the war ended, the new Communist authorities confiscated almost the entire monastic estate. Only two monks remained in the monastery. In 1946 the monastery kept only 10 ha (25 acres), but then even this was reduced by half. The number of monks dwindled and so did the number of believers and visitors, as the state became officially atheistic. As the monastery was left without its land, remaining monks began to develop monastic farming. From 1980 to 1990 there were no residing monks and, except for intermittent stays, monastery was virtually abandoned.

In 1990, three hieromonks were sent to revitalize the monastery: Porfirije Perić (future Patriarch of the Serbian Orthodox Church), Fotije Sladojević and Andrej Ćilerdžić. All three later became bishops of the Serbian Orthodox Church. They began the renovation and expansion of the complex. Construction of the new konak began in 2003, when the renovation of the church started, too. Winter chapel was completed in 2009 and the church was repainted. The monastic life includes the daily holy liturgy; fasting on Monday, Wednesday, and Friday; and the absence of meat from the menu. Though Profirije was appointed Titular Bishop of Jegra in 1999, he remained in the monastery. He left in 2014 when he became the Metropolitan bishop of Zagreb and Ljubljana. In January 2022, there were 29 monks and novices in the monastery.

The monastery gained media attention due to the airing of the Bukvar pravoslavlja (the "Primer of Orthodoxy"), from 1996 to 2007. The episodes were shot in Kovilj and they were hosted and edited by then hegumen of the monastery, Porfirije Perić. The monastery also has a choir, noted for its Byzantine chanting. They basically renewed the tradition which almost died out. The choirmasters established the School of Byzantine Chanting in Novi Sad, in 2011. The choir published four CDs by 2020, including Посредъ Цркве Воспою Та in 2000, and Псалми in 2019.

== Architecture ==
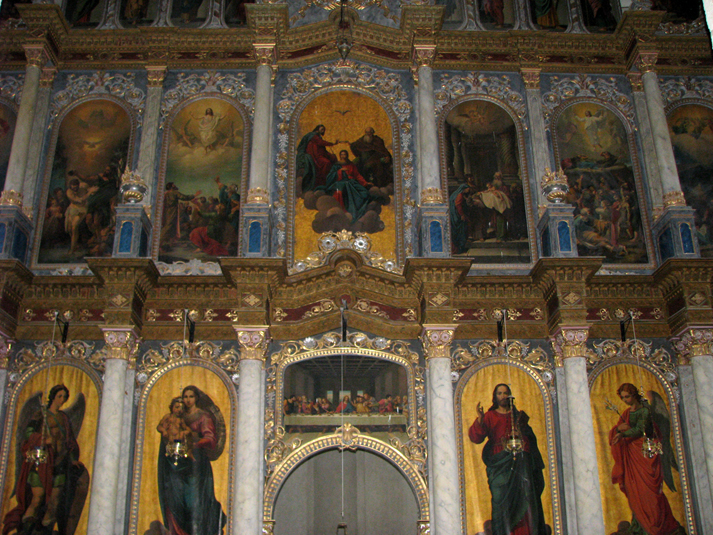
Iconostasis

Church's iconostasis is one of the few in modern Vojvodina, not being made in the baroque manner. Marodić painted iconostasis contrary to the canons of the Orthodox faith. Trained in Italy, he was heavily influenced by the Renaissance. Leonardo da Vinci's The Last Supper is not being painted in Orthodox churches but Marodić painted it in the prominent, central position. Other non-canonical deviations include lack of the visible halos around the saints' heads, no names of the saint on the icons, God painted in human form, and representations of the Holy Trinity and the Coronation of the Virgin. The frescoes on the walls and columns, on the other hand, followed the church canons. Some additional work on the paintings and the icons was later done by Uroš Predić.

After the 1850 renovation, the monastery gathered a vast new artistic and historical collection. It includes rare and valuable books and manuscripts which are kept in a large monastic library, the paintings of Uroš Predić and Rafailo Momčilović, the collection of musical literature (assembled by Damaskin Davidović), numerous icons from the 18th and 19th centuries, the monastic archive, etc. The monastery also has spacious rooms and salons equipped with antique furniture, chandeliers, stoves, etc., but also a modern dining room and an ophthalmology cabinet. There is also a tomb of Jovan Rajić and his original works can be found in his memorial museum.

On the location of the old church, which was demolished in 1850, there is a stone marker. Also part of the complex is a small chapel dedicated to Saint Petka, which is just outside of the walls. It leans on the hollow oak, which was estimated to be 600 years old in 2010.

== Economy ==
Kovilj is known for its honey and rakia. In the process of restitution, the state returned to the monastery previously nationalized 300 ha (740 acres) of arable land and 700 ha (1,700 acres) of forests. As of 2017, a brotherhood of 30 monks cultivates some 50 ha (120 acres). They keep 200 bee hives and produce a famed white basil honey (from Stachys annua L.). The monastery produces a variety of brandies made of quince, plums, green nuts, and also cognac and walnut liqueur. The monastery produces 50,000 L (11,000 imp gal; 13,000 US gal) of brandy per year. There is also a small dairy.

Other activities include production of candles and crafting of icons, which, together with numerous herbal balms, can be bought in the monastic shop.

== Land of the living ==
From the first citations of the monastery, there was a monastic school in it. In 2004, heguman Porfirije decided to change the purpose of the object and adapted it into the drug rehabilitation center for young drug addicts, within his project Zemlja živih ("Land of the living"). The project expanded beyond the monastery so in 2006 a community was formed on the salaš in Čenej, and then houses were opened in the villages of Vilovo and Brajkovac. A female community was formed in the monastery in Bačko Petrovo Selo. Within the scope of the program, which lasts from 12 to 36 months, there were 120 wards in 2017. They are supervised by the priests and former addicts and do numerous works, like cooking and cultivating the land, while those with artistic leanings make icons and woodcuts.

== See also ==
- List of Serbian Orthodox monasteries
