= Kovilj =

Kovilj Ковиљ (Serbian)
- Suburban settlement
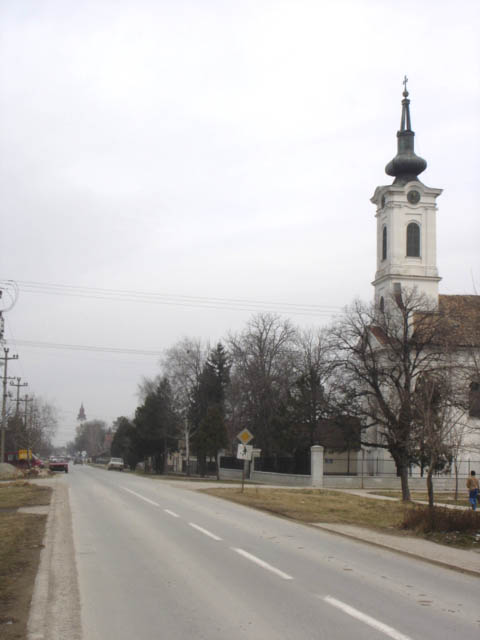
- Orthodox churches in Kovilj

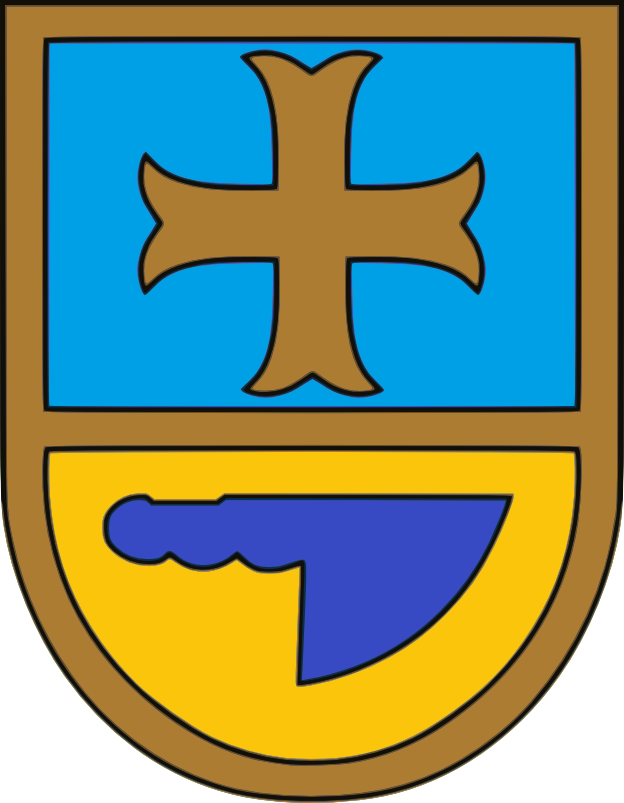
- Seal

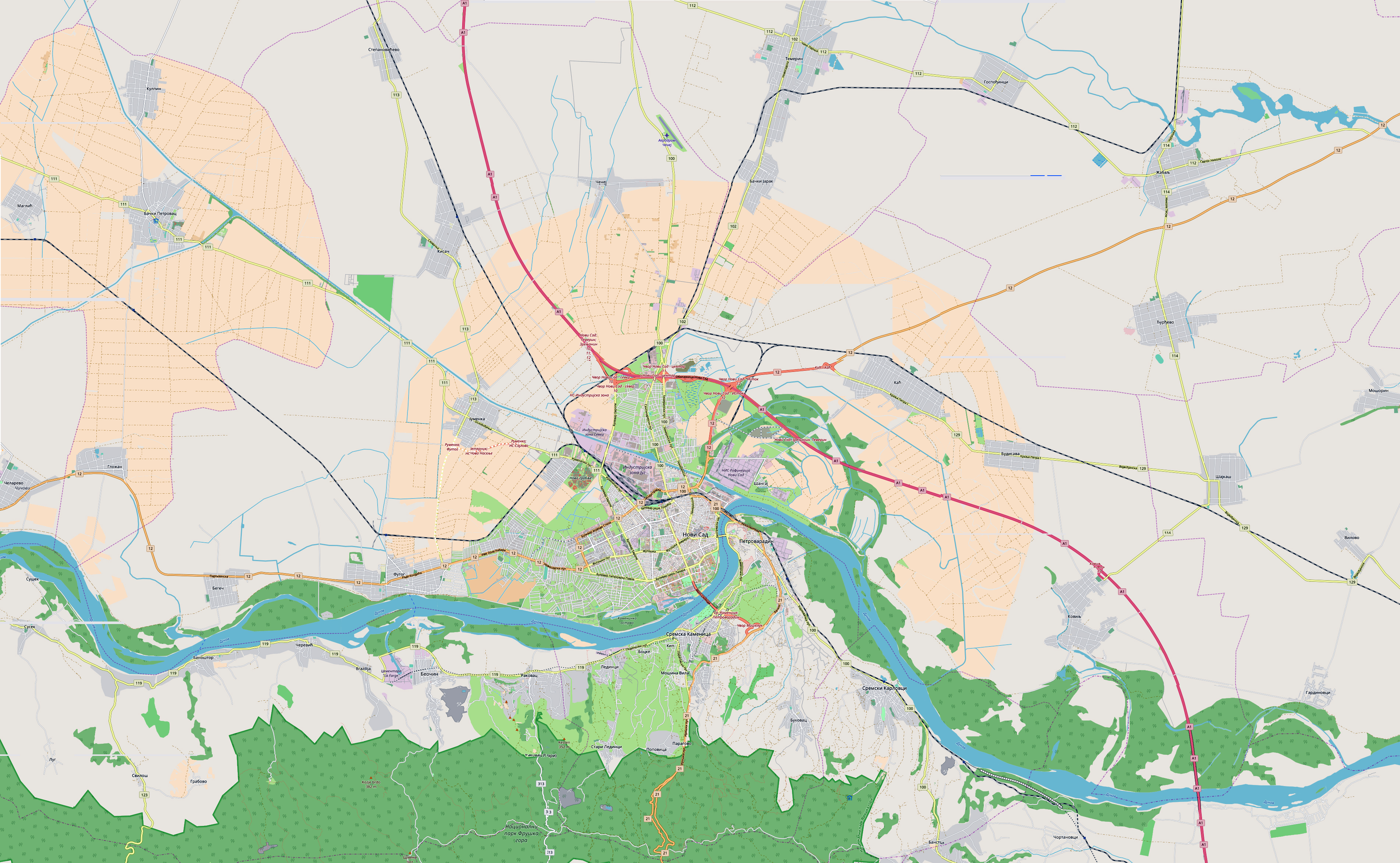
- Location within Novi Sad Location within Vojvodina Location within Serbia
- Coordinates: 45°14′N 20°1′E
- Country: Serbia
- Province: Vojvodina
- District: South Bačka
- Municipality: Novi Sad

Area
  - Total: 108.65 km^{2} (41.95 sq mi)

Population (2002)
  - Total: 5,599
  - Density: 51.53/km^{2} (133.5/sq mi)
- Time zone: UTC+1 (CET)
  - Summer (DST): UTC+2 (CEST)

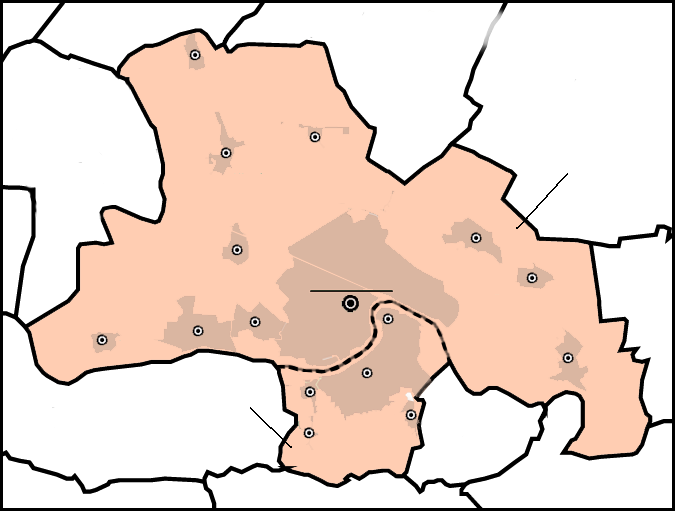

Kovilj (Serbian Cyrillic: Ковиљ) is a suburban settlement of the city of Novi Sad, Serbia.

== Name ==
The Serbian name of the village derived from Serbian word "kovilj", which is a name for one sort of flower grass.

== Geography ==
The village is divided into Gornji Kovilj (Upper Kovilj) and Donji Kovilj (Lower Kovilj), which were two separate settlements in the past, but today are parts of one single settlement.

== History ==
In the 13th century, a settlement named Kabul was mentioned at this location. Other names used for the settlement in the past were Kaboli and Kobila, hence it is presumed that name of the settlement derived from Slavic word "kobila" ("mare" in English). Kovilj is not far from the city of Novi Sad.

Donji Kovilj was first mentioned in 1554, and Gornji Kovilj in 1702. Two villages were joined in 1870.

The existence of the village after found traces dating back 5,500 years BC . The village has existed during the reign of the Romans and Avars. The first written evidence of this village were created only in the 13th century, when it was called Kabul. Kovilj at the end of the 18th century got its name from one sort of flower grass.

Today in Kovilj still exists division into the lower(Šanački) and uper(Gornji Kovilj). Donji(lower) Kovilj developed with the monastery and existed even before the Great Migrations and arrival of Arsenije III Čarnojević 1650.

The inhabitants lived on fishing, hunting, wood cutting by marshes and military service. Residents of Kovilj were good soldiers who kept watch at the "Koviljski šančevi" (Kovilj Moat) and prevented incursions by the Turks in Austria-Hungary. From that time remained a habit that people from the Lower Kovilja called "Šančani". Upper Kovilj arises settling of Serbs from Subotica in 1746. These Serbs were the only soldiers who belonged to the "Šajkaška battalion" as crews scurry wooden boats who fought on the Danube, Sava and Tisa preventing attacks against the Turks. Since 1870, when construction of embankments on the Danube and deforestation are changing and the interest of residents for jobs. Begins dealing with agriculture and production of bricks. Kovilj in 1900 numbered about 5,200 inhabitants and had a steam mill, a brickyard and electricity in homes.

== Culture ==
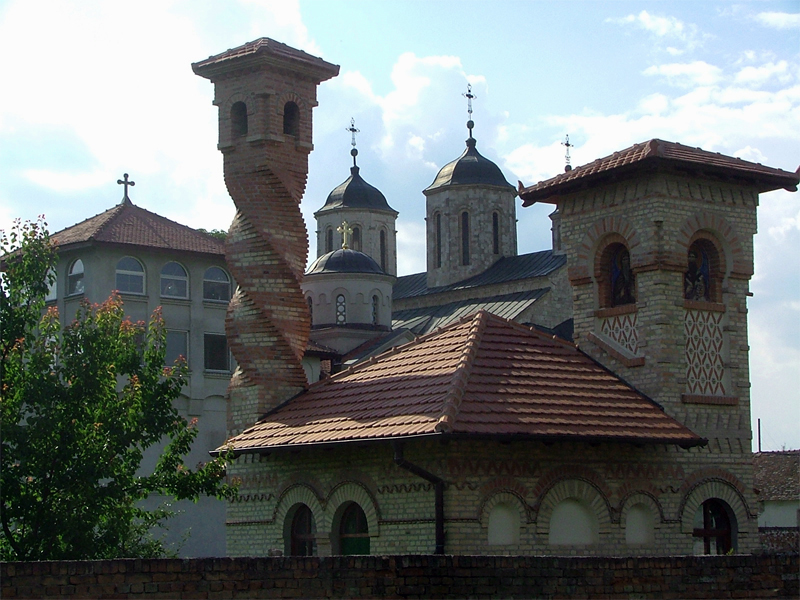
Kovilj Monastery.

Near the village is well known Kovilj Monastery. The monastery was reconstructed in 1705–1707, but according to the legend, it was founded by the first Serb archbishop Saint Sava in the 13th century.

There are also two Orthodox churches in the village, the Church of the Ascension of Jesus in (uper)Gornji Kovilj, constructed in 1829 with a beautiful iconostasis which was made by monk Rafailo Momčilović, and second Church of Thomas the Apostle built in 1846 in Donji(lower)Kovilj.

== Nature ==
Near Kovilj is located Special Nature Reserve Koviljsko-Petrovardinski Rit. It is a complex of marshes and forest ecosystems (4,840 ha) with numerous biocoenoses integrated into a functional whole. It is internationally important Ramsar convention wetland site.

The core values of this area are represented by the preserved and diverse indigenous orographic and hydrographic forms of marshes (islands, backwaters, ponds, swamps); the preserved, abundant indigenous plant communities in marshes (forests, meadows, reeds, rushes); the diversity and abundance of fauna (172 species of birds and 46 species of fish) and particularly by the presence of rare and endangered species.

=== Historical population ===
Historical population
Year	Pop.	±%
1961	5,448	—
1971	5,290	−2.9%
1981	5,279	−0.2%
1991	5,242	−0.7%
2002	5,599	+6.8%

== Notable people ==
- Laza Kostić (1841–1910), a Serb literate. He was born in Kovilj.

== Gallery ==
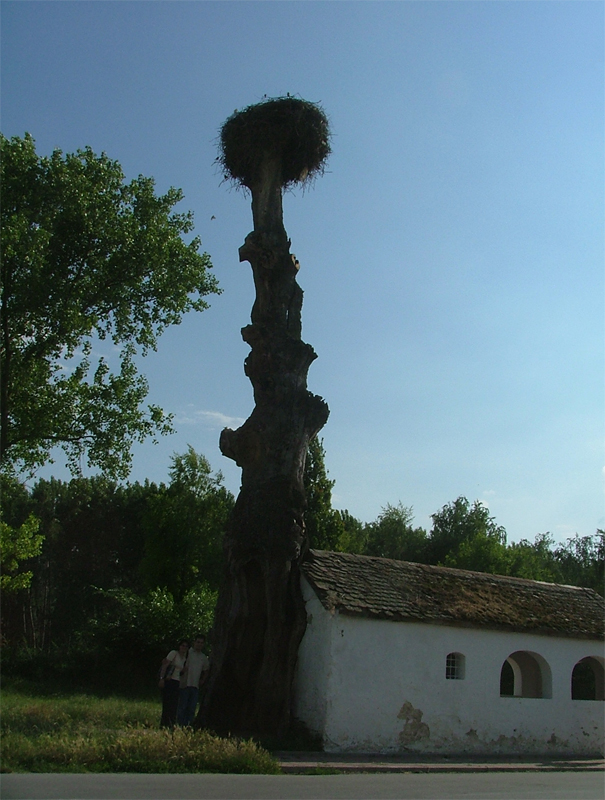
Stork in Arkanj

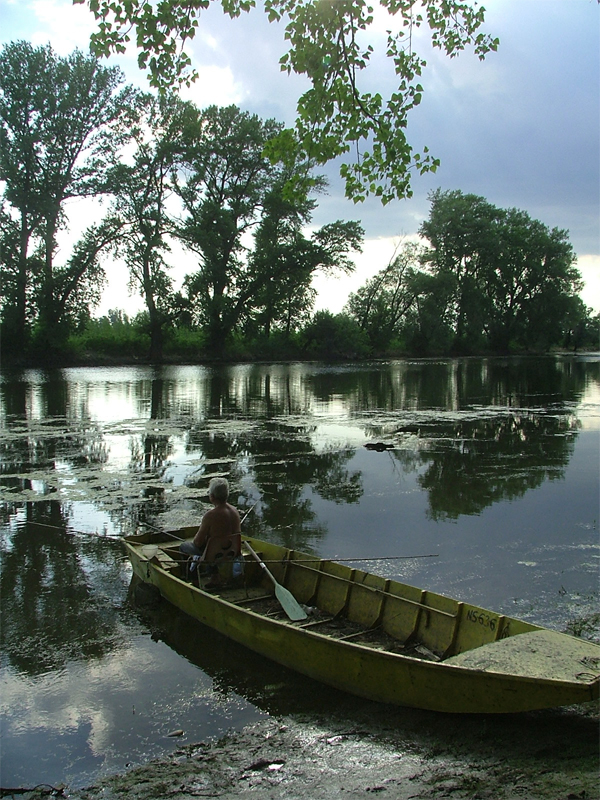
Arkanj

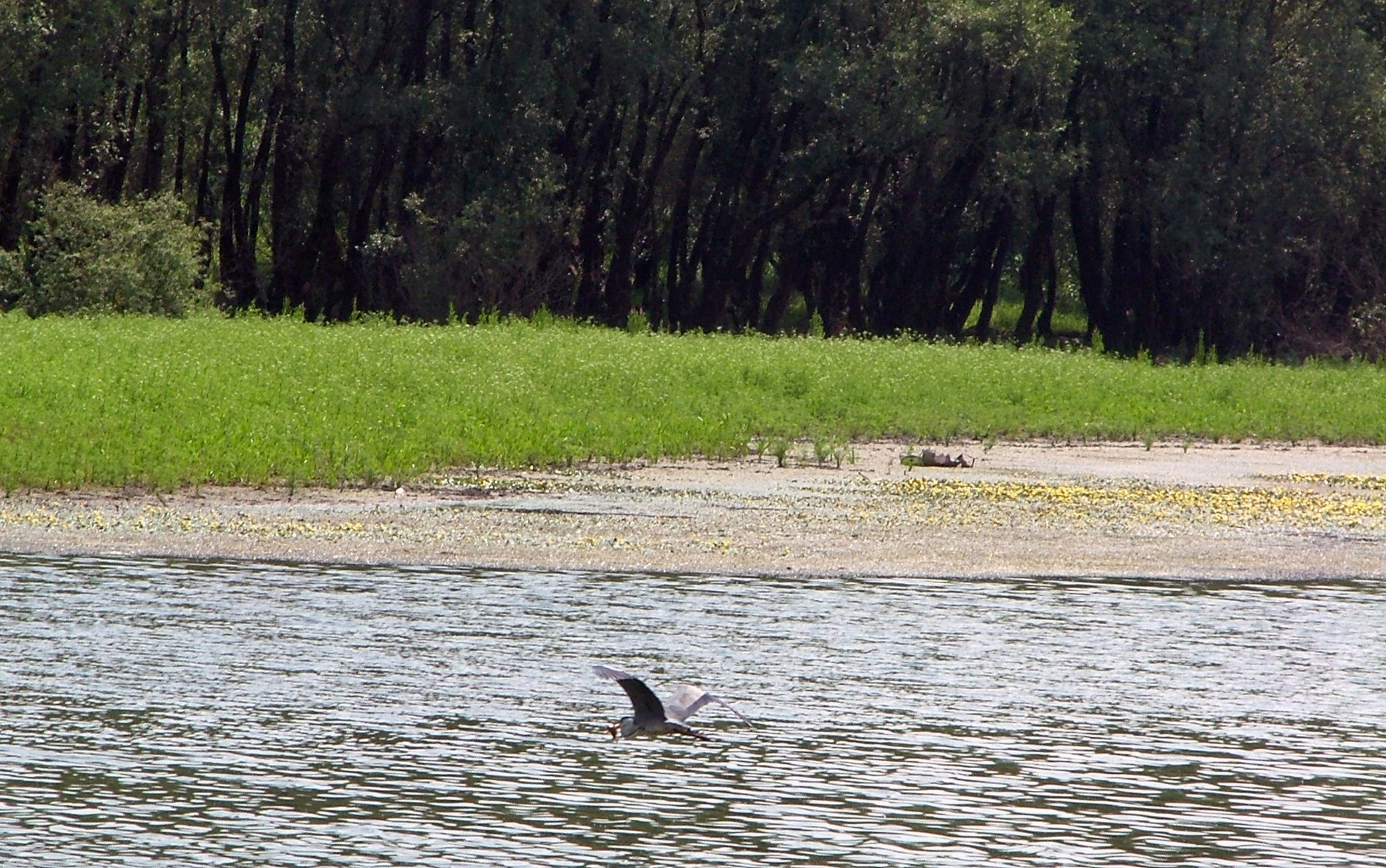
Kovilj-Petrovaradin Marshes

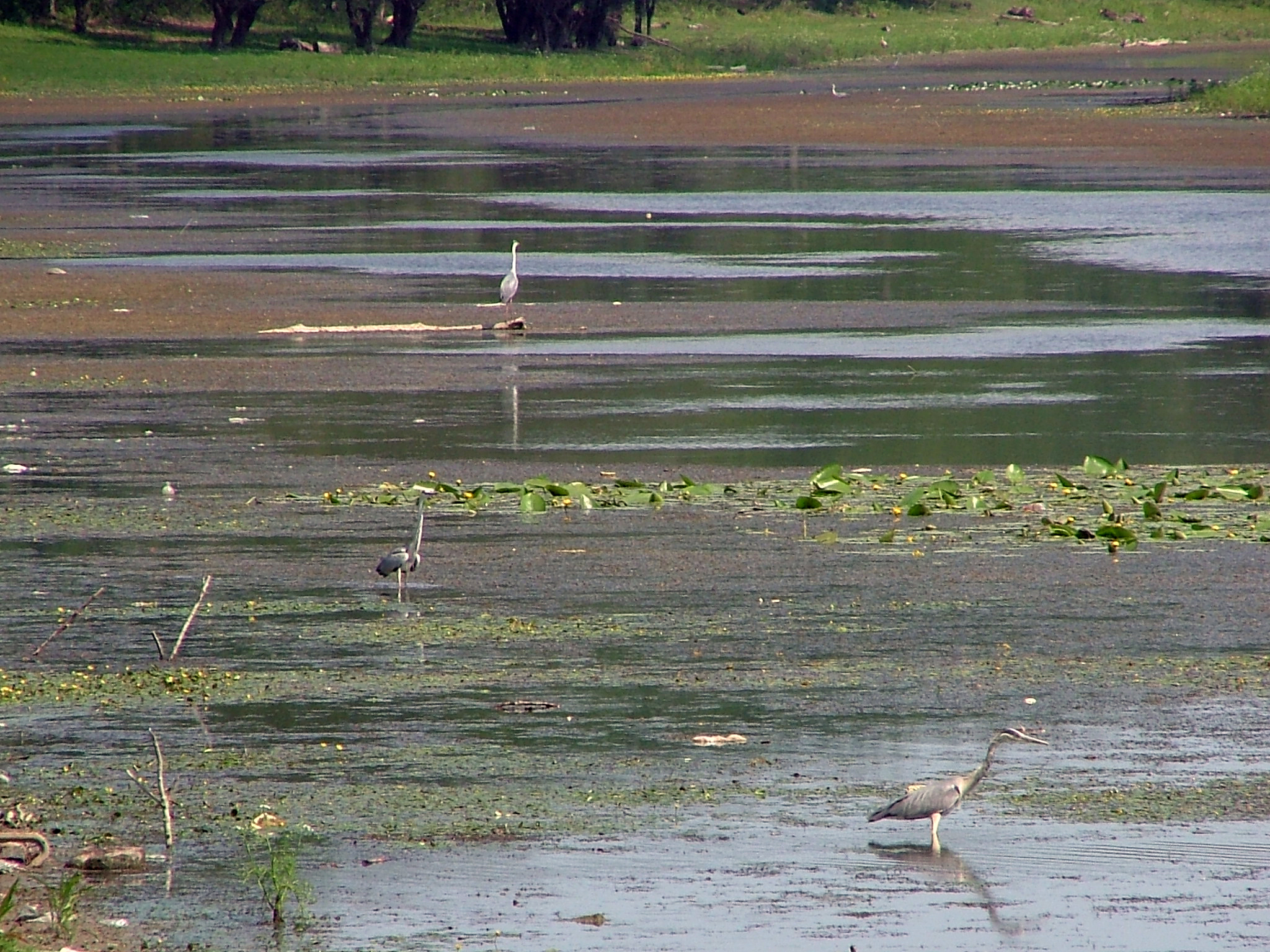
Kovilj-Petrovaradin Marshes

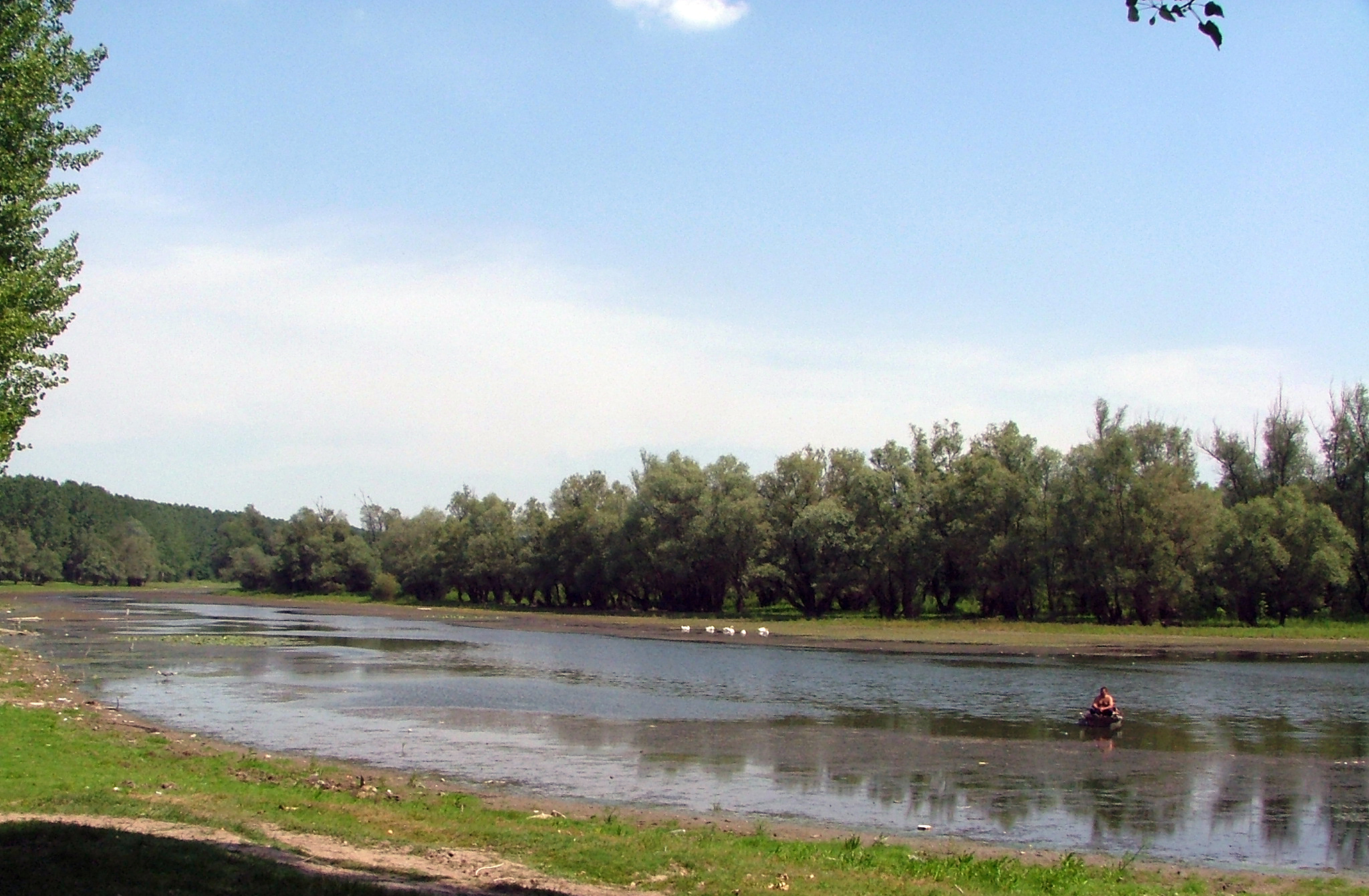
Kovilj nature

== See also ==
- Novi Sad
- List of places in Serbia
- List of cities, towns and villages in Vojvodina
