= Arnold =

Arnold may refer to:

== People ==
- Arnold (given name), a masculine given name
- Arnold (surname), a German and English surname

== Places ==
=== Australia ===
- Arnold, Victoria, a small town in the Australian state of Victoria

=== Canada ===
- Arnold, Nova Scotia

=== United Kingdom ===
- Arnold, East Riding of Yorkshire
- Arnold, Nottinghamshire

=== United States ===
- Arnold, California, in Calaveras County
- Arnold, Carroll County, Illinois
- Arnold, Morgan County, Illinois
- Arnold, Iowa
- Arnold, Kansas
- Arnold, Maryland
- Arnold, Mendocino County, California
- Arnold, Michigan
- Arnold, Minnesota
- Arnold, Missouri
- Arnold, Nebraska
- Arnold, Ohio
- Arnold, Pennsylvania
- Arnold, Texas
- Arnold, Brooke County, West Virginia
- Arnold, Wisconsin
- Arnold Arboretum of Harvard University, Massachusetts
- Arnold Township, Custer County, Nebraska

== Other uses ==
- Arnold (automobile), a short-lived English car
- Arnold of Manchester, a former English coachbuilder
- Arnold (band), an English indie band
- Arnold (comic strip), a comic strip from the mid-1980s
- Arnold (crater), crater on the Moon
- Arnold (film), a 1973 American comedy horror film
- Arnold (Hey Arnold!), the main character of the Nickelodeon animated television series Hey Arnold!
- Arnold (models), a toy and model railway company
- Arnold (software), 3D rendering software
- Arnold Worldwide, an American advertising agency
- Arnold Town F.C., an English football team
- Edward Arnold (publisher), a British publishing house with its head office in London, founded in 1890
- Arnold (TV series), 2023 documentary series about Arnold Schwarzenegger

== See also ==
- Arnaud (disambiguation), French equivalent given name
- Arnie (disambiguation)
- Justice Arnold (disambiguation)
