= Arnie =

Arnie is a masculine given name, frequently a shortened version of Arnold. It may refer to:

== People ==
- Arnie Arenz (1911–1985), American National Football League quarterback in 1934
- Arnie Beyeler (born 1964), American minor league baseball player and manager and Major League Baseball coach and instructor
- Arnie Brown (1942–2019), Canadian National Hockey League player
- Arnie Ferrin, Jr. (1925–2022), American National Basketball Association player
- Arnie Fisher (born 1938), American professional bridge player, bridge author
- Arnold Galiffa (1927–1978), American National Football League and Canadian Football League quarterback
- Arnie David Giralt (born 1984), Cuban triple jumper
- Arnie Hamilton, Canadian politician
- Arnie Herber (1910–1969), American Hall-of-Fame National Football League quarterback
- Arnold Horween (1898–1985), American college and National Football League player and coach
- Arnie Johnson (1920–2000), American National Basketball Association player
- Arnie Kogen, American comedy writer
- Arnie Kullman (1927–1999), Canadian hockey player
- Arnie Lawrence (1938–2005), American jazz saxophonist
- Arnie Lerma (1950–2018), American writer and activist, former Scientologist and critic of Scientology
- Arnie McWatters, Canadian Football League quarterback in the 1930s and '40s
- Arnie Morrison (1909–1976), Canadian Football League player in the 1930s
- Arnie Morton (1922–2005), American restaurateur who founded Morton's Restaurant Group/Morton's Steakhouse
- Arnie Oliver (1907–1993), American Soccer League player, member of the National Soccer Hall of Fame
- Arnold Palmer (1929–2016), American Hall-of-Fame golfer
- Arnie Patterson (1928–2011), Canadian journalist, public relations professional and broadcaster
- Arnie Portocarrero (1931–1986), American Major League Baseball pitcher
- Arnie Risen (1924–2012), American Hall-of-Fame college basketball and National Basketball Association player
- Arnie Robinson, Jr. (1948–2020), American long jumper, 1976 Olympic champion
- Arnie Roblan (born 1948), American politician
- Arnie Roth, American Grammy Award-winning conductor, composer and record producer
- Arnold Schwarzenegger (born 1947), Austrian-American actor, former professional bodybuilder and politician
- Arnie Shockley (1903–1988), American National Football League player
- Arnie Sidebottom (born 1954), English footballer and cricketer
- Arnie Simkus (born 1943), American National Football League player
- Arnie Sowell (born 1935), American middle distance runner
- Arnie States, a radio host on The Rob, Arnie, and Dawn Show
- Arnie Stone (1892–1948), American Major League Baseball pitcher
- Arnie Stuthman (born 1941), American politician
- Arnie Teves (born 1971), Filipino politician
- Arnie Tuadles (1956–1996), Philippine Basketball Association player
- Arnie Weinmeister (1923–2000), Canadian Hall-of-Fame National Football League player
- Arnie Zane (1948–1988), American photographer, choreographer and dancer
- Arnold Zimmerman (1954–2021), American ceramic artist

== Fictional characters ==
- Arnold "Arnie" Cunningham, protagonist of the novel Christine by Stephen King
- Arnie Nuvo, title character of the TV sitcom Arnie (1970–1972)
- The player character in Arnie and Arnie II, video games for the Commodore 64

== See also ==
- Arne (disambiguation)
- Arney (disambiguation)
- Arnee and the Terminaters, a one-hit wonder band that parodied Schwarzenegger and the "Terminator" character
- Arnaud (disambiguation)
- Arnold (disambiguation)
- Arny (disambiguation)
