= Peters (crater) =

Crater on the Moon

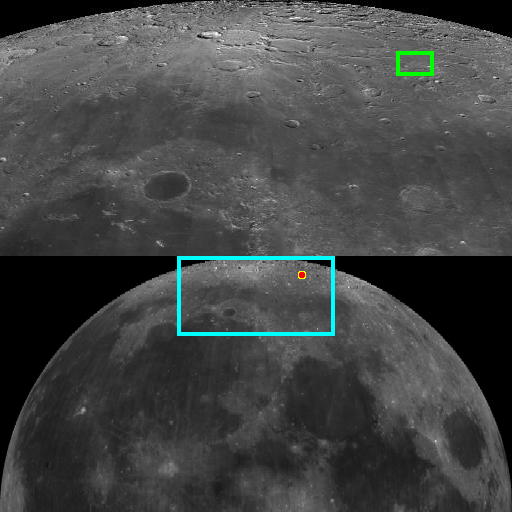
- Location of the lunar crater Peters.
- Coordinates: 68.1°N 29.5°E
- Diameter: 15 km
- Depth: Unknown
- Colongitude: 331° at sunrise
- Eponym: Christian A. F. Peters

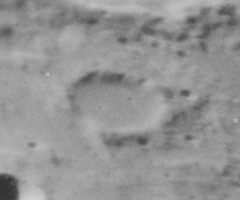
Oblique view from Lunar Orbiter 4

Peters is a small lunar impact crater in the north-northeastern part of the Moon, lying in the gap between Neison to the west and Arnold to the southeast. Due south of Peters is the crater Moigno.

This is not a particularly prominent feature, having a low rim and an interior floor that is almost completely submerged by lava flows. The rim is circular and only lightly worn, with a notch along the southeast; the inner surface is level and almost featureless.
