= Kane (crater) =

Crater on the Moon

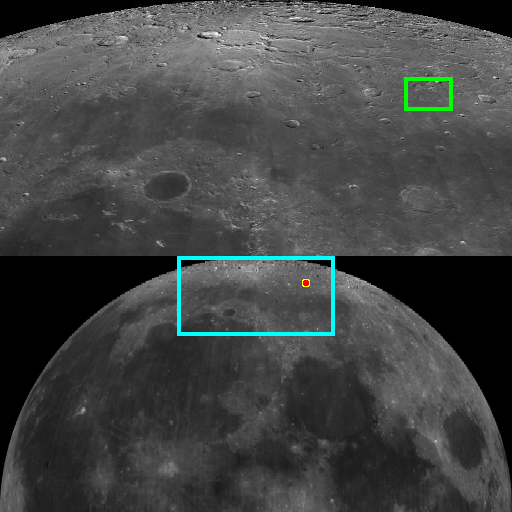
- Location of the lunar crater Kane.
- Coordinates: 63.1°N 26.1°E
- Diameter: 55 km
- Depth: 0.57 km
- Colongitude: 335° at sunrise
- Eponym: Elisha K. Kane

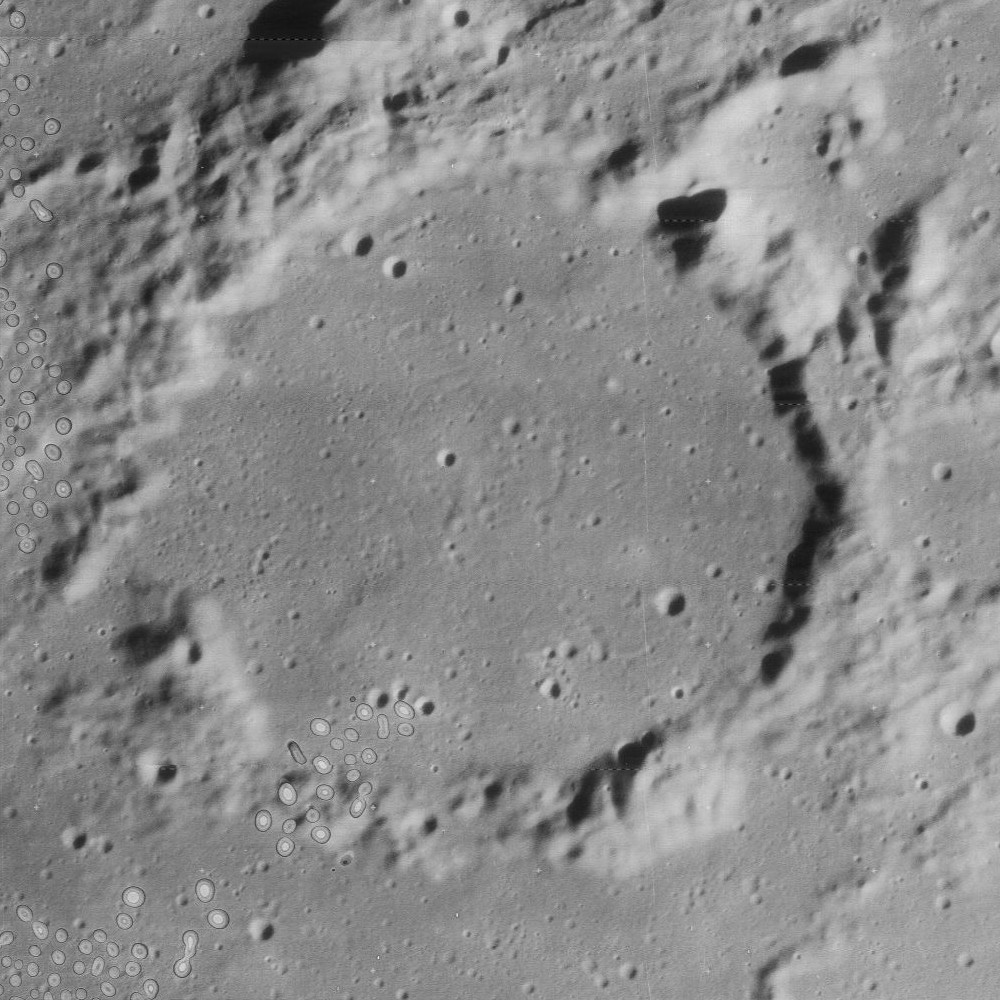
View from Lunar Orbiter 4

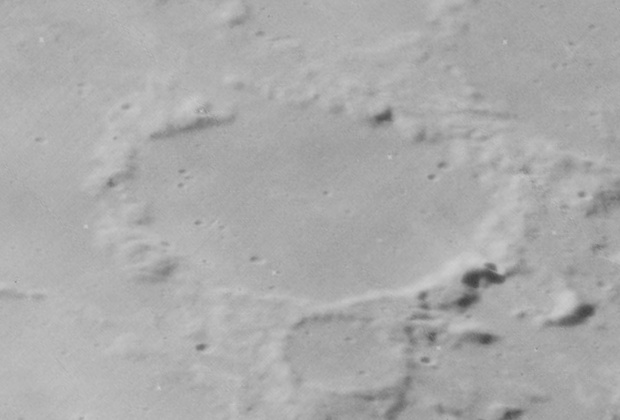
Oblique view also from Lunar Orbiter 4

Kane is the walled remains of a lunar impact crater that has been flooded by lava from Mare Frigoris to the south, and it lies on the northeast edge of this mare. The crater lies midway between the craters C. Mayer to the west and Democritus in the east. To the north-northeast is the crater Moigno.

The floor of this crater is flat and covered in lava flow, with no significant craters within the outer rim. Nothing remains of a central peak, if it ever possessed such a feature. The outer wall displays gaps along the south where it joins the Mare Frigoris. The remainder of the rim is circular but displays wear.

The crater is named after the American Arctic explorer Elisha Kent Kane (1820-1857).

== Satellite craters ==
By convention these features are identified on lunar maps by placing the letter on the side of the crater midpoint that is closest to Kane.

Kane	Latitude	Longitude	Diameter
A	61.2° N	27.0° E	5 km
F	59.6° N	23.1° E	7 km
G	59.2° N	25.3° E	10 km
