= Arny =

Arny may refer to:

== Given name ==
- Arny Freeman (1908–1986), American actor
- Arny Freytag (born 1950), American photographer
- Arny Karl (1940–2000), American artist
- Árný Margrét (born 2001), Icelandic musician
- Arny Ross (born 1991), Filipino actress and model

== Surname ==
- Mary Travis Arny (1909–1997) American author
- William Frederick Milton Arny (1813–1881), United States Indian agent

== See also ==
- Arney (disambiguation)
- Arnie (disambiguation)
  - Arnie, a given name
