= Christopher Arnold =

Christopher Arnold may refer to:

- Chris Arnold (baseball) (born 1947), former Major League Baseball Player
- Christoph Arnold (1650–1695), German astronomer

== See also ==
- Christian Arnold, English musician commonly credited as "Chris Arnold"
