= Arney (disambiguation) =

Arney may refer to:

== Places ==
- Arney, a village in Northern Ireland
- Arney River, a small river in County Fermanagh, Northern Ireland
- Arney (civil parish), a civil parish located in the barony of Clanawley and Tirkennedy in County Fermanagh, Northern Ireland
- Arney, Indiana, an unincorporated community in eastern Jefferson Township, Owen County, in the U.S. state of Indiana

== Names ==
- Arney (surname)

== See also ==
- Arne (disambiguation)
- Arnie
- Arny (disambiguation)
