= Arnie (disambiguation) =

Arnie is a masculine given name or nickname. It may also refer to:

- Arnie (video game), a 1992 game for the Commodore 64
- Arnie II, a 1993 computer game, sequel to Arnie
- Arnie (TV series), a 1970s sitcom
- "Arnie", a song from the 1997 Brown Album by Primus
