= Judge Arnold =

Judge Arnold may refer to:

- Glendy B. Arnold (1875–1955), Missouri circuit judge
- Morris S. Arnold (born 1941), judge of the United States Court of Appeals for the Eighth Circuit
- Richard David Arnold (born 1961), a Judge of the Court of Appeal of England and Wales.
- Richard S. Arnold (1936–2004), judge of the United States Court of Appeals for the Eighth Circuit
- Thurman Arnold (1891–1969), judge of the United States Court of Appeals for the District of Columbia
- William W. Arnold (1877–1957), judge of the United States Tax Court

== See also ==
- Justice Arnold (disambiguation)
