= Gärtner (crater) =

Crater on the Moon

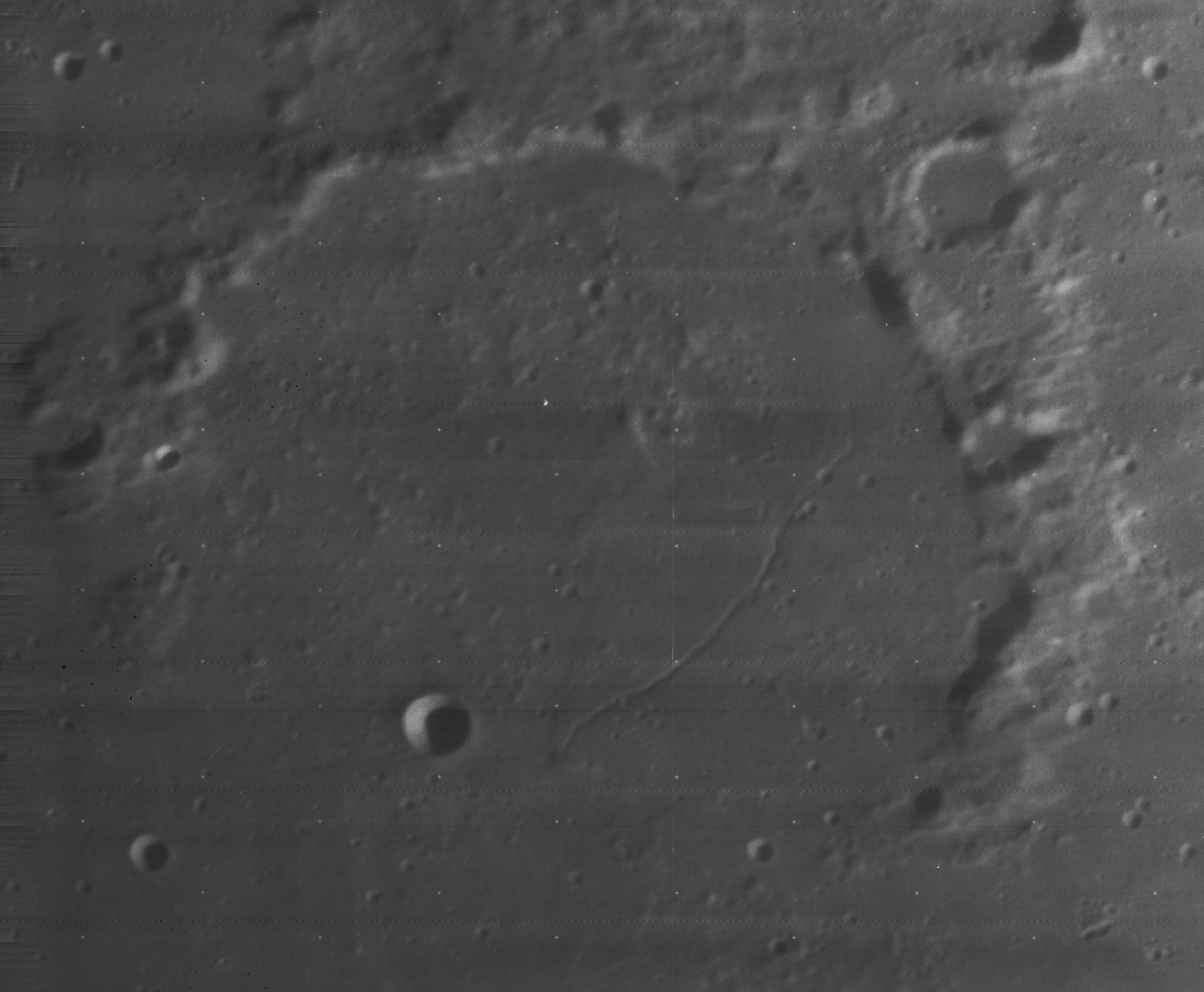
- Lunar Orbiter 4 image
- Coordinates: 59.1°N 34.6°E
- Diameter: 101.79 km (63.25 mi)
- Depth: 1.3 km (0.81 mi)
- Colongitude: 326° at sunrise
- Eponym: Christian Gärtner

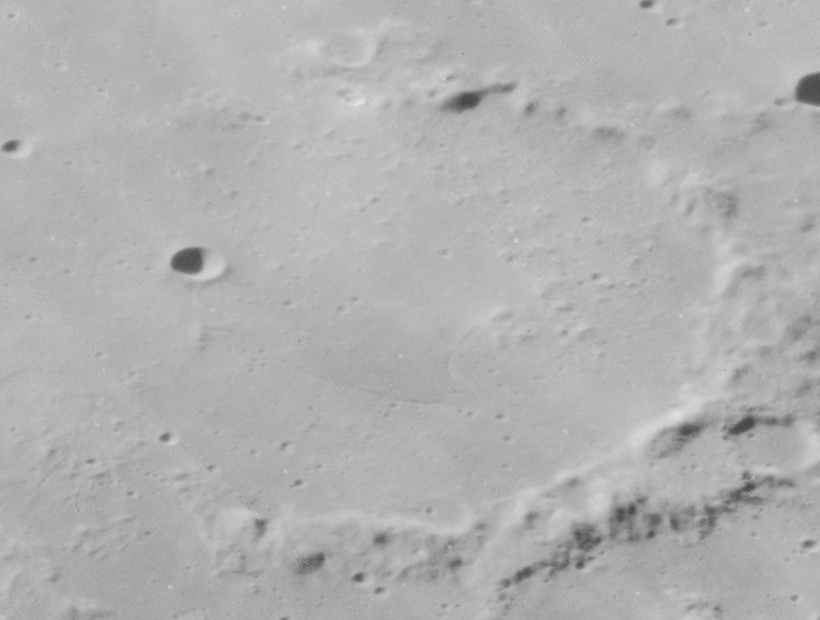
Oblique view from Lunar Orbiter 4

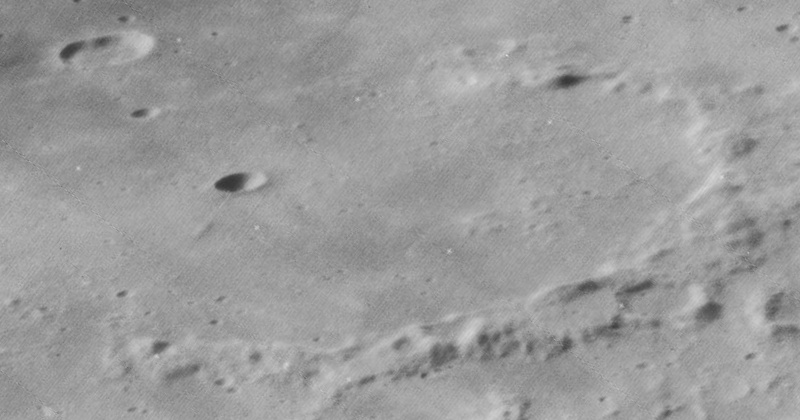
Another Oblique view from Lunar Orbiter 4

Gärtner is the basalt-flooded remnant of a crater in the northeast part of the Moon. It is a located on the northern edge of the Mare Frigoris. The southern half of the formation is completely missing, and Gärtner forms a semi-circular bay along the edges of the lunar mare. To the north lies the crater Democritus.

The surviving parts of the crater rim are heavily worn and eroded, with notches and indentations formed by past impacts. The floor has a few low rises in the northern half. A rille designated Rima Gärtner runs from the midpoint of the crater toward the northeast rim, for a total length of about 43 kilometers.

The bowl-shaped craterlet Gärtner D is located near the midpoint between the two ends of the crater rim. This feature is classed as a dark-halo crater, where darker mare material has been excavated from the impact.

The Gärtner crater is named after German mineralogist and geologist Christian Gärtner (c. 1750–1813). His name was incorporated with the lunar nomenclature of German astronomer Johann H. Schröter in 1791. Its designation was formally adopted in 1935 by the International Astronomical Union.

== Satellite craters ==
By convention these features are identified on lunar maps by placing the letter on the side of the crater midpoint that is closest to Gärtner.

Gärtner	Latitude	Longitude	Diameter
A	60.7° N	37.8° E	14 km
C	59.4° N	31.0° E	8 km
D	58.5° N	33.9° E	8 km
E	61.5° N	43.8° E	7 km
F	57.5° N	30.1° E	14 km
G	59.5° N	39.8° E	33 km
M	55.5° N	37.0° E	11 km
