= C. Mayer (crater) =

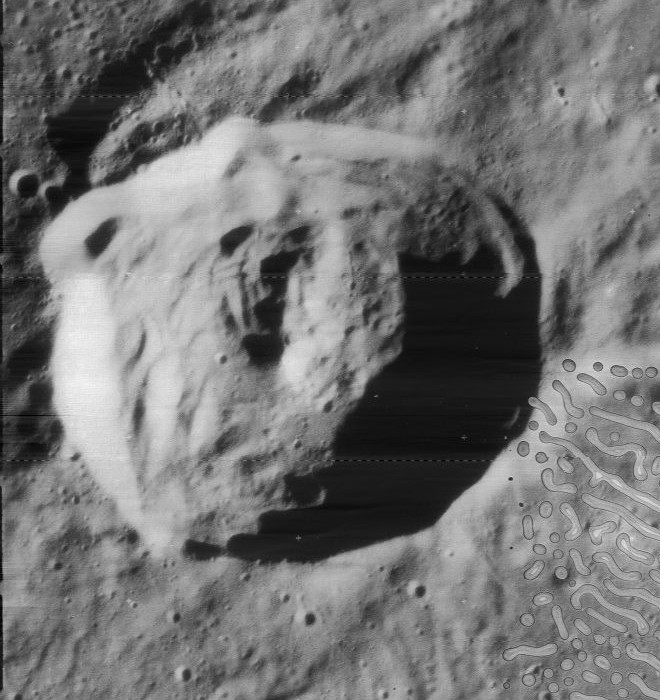
- View from Lunar Orbiter 4
- Coordinates: 63.2°N 17.3°E
- Diameter: 37.54 km (23.33 mi)
- Depth: 3.24 km (2.01 mi)
- Colongitude: 343° at sunrise
- Eponym: Christian Mayer

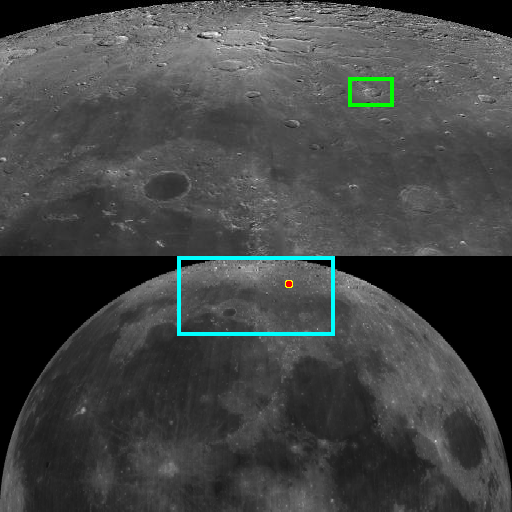
Location of the crater C. Mayer

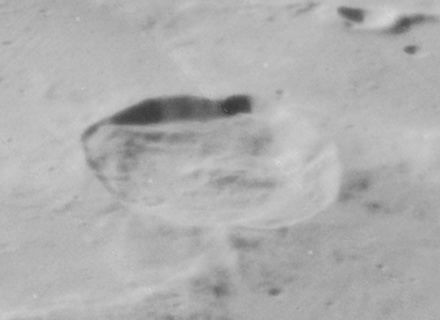
Oblique view also from Lunar Orbiter 4

C. Mayer is a lunar impact crater that is located at the northern edge of the Mare Frigoris. It is at the western end of the Montes Carpatus range, and due north of the prominent crater Aristoteles. Also to the south, but only a third as distant, is the smaller crater Sheepshanks. Due east of C. Mayer is the flooded crater Kane.

C. Mayer is a relatively young formation, with a sharp-edged and well-defined outer rim. The rim is not quite circular, and appears somewhat polygonal-shaped with outward bulges along the edge, most notably to the west. The inner walls have a terrace system and the interior is somewhat rough and irregular. The central peak lies just to the north of the midpoint, and extends in a northerly direction.

The lava-flooded formation C. Mayer D is attached to the southeastern rim of the crater, and a gap in the southeastern rim joins it to the Mare Frigoris. Thus the lunar mare extends up to the outer rampart of C. Mayer.

This crater is named after the Moravian astronomer and teacher Christian Mayer (1719-1783). His name was added to lunar nomenclature by German astronomer Johann H. Schröter in 1791. Its designation was adopted by the International Astronomical Union in 1935.

== Satellite craters ==
By convention these features are identified on lunar maps by placing the letter on the side of the crater midpoint that is closest to C. Mayer. (See the C Mayer D crater that is very similar in shape to the map of Brazil). >> [(pt:C. Mayer D (Cratera) )]

C. Mayer	Latitude	Longitude	Diameter
B	60.2° N	15.6° E	36 km
D	62.1° N	18.6° E	66 km
E	61.1° N	16.0° E	12 km
F	62.0° N	19.5° E	7 km
H	64.1° N	14.7° E	43 km

The satellite features F and H include permanently shadowed regions where the sunlight never reaches.
