= Justice Arnold =

Justice Arnold may refer to:

- Dutee Arnold (1763–1849), associate justice of the Rhode Island Supreme Court
- James M. Arnold (1838–1897), associate justice and chief justice of the Supreme Court of Mississippi
- Josiah Arnold (judge) (fl. 1740s), associate justice of the Rhode Island Supreme Court
- Morris S. Arnold (born 1941), special chief justice of the Arkansas Supreme Court
- Peleg Arnold (1751–1820), chief justice of the Rhode Island Supreme Court
- Ralph L. Arnold (1887–1948), associate justice of the Montana Supreme Court
- Richard David Arnold (born 1961), formally Lord Justice Arnold, a Judge of the Court of Appeal of England and Wales.
- Thomas Arnold (judge) (1750–1826), associate justice of the Rhode Island Supreme Court
- W. H. "Dub" Arnold (1935–2023), associate justice of the Arkansas Supreme Court

== See also ==
- Judge Arnold (disambiguation)
