= Christian Gärtner =

German telescope maker and astronomer

Christian Gärtner (6 May 1705 – 31 December 1782) was a German telescope maker and astronomer, noted for his observation of the 1758 return of Halley's Comet.

Gärtner was born at Tolkewitz near Dresden and even as a child had a passion for the stars. He earned his living as a cloth-bleacher and spent his income on astronomical equipment and books. Later, he learned to grind his own lenses and manufactured and sold telescopes.

In December 1758 (simultaneously with Johann Georg Palitzsch) Gärtner observed the return of Halley's Comet, predicted by Edmond Halley in 1705.

Gärtner died a pauper in 1782 and was buried in Leuben cemetery. He is commemorated by a crater on the Moon and by 132445 Gaertner, an asteroid.
