= Arney (surname) =

Arney is a surname. Notable people with the surname include:

- Angela Arney, British writer
- George Arney (1810–1883), New Zealand lawyer
- George Arney (journalist), British journalist
- Giada Arney, American astrobiologist
- Helen Arney, British physicist
- Kat Arney, British science communicator
- Margaret Arney (born 1969), Wisconsin politician
- David C. Arney, retired United States Army brigadier general and applied mathematician
