= David C. Arney =

United States Army brigadier general and mathematician

David Christopher Arney
- Nickname: Chris
- Allegiance: United States
- Service years: 1971–2001
- Rank: Brigadier General
- Known for: Numerical solutions of differential equations; number theory; network science; mathematical modeling contests
- Education: United States Military Academy (BS); Rensselaer Polytechnic Institute (MS, MS, PhD)
- Other work: Applied mathematician; academic administrator; professor emeritus

David Christopher "Chris" Arney is a retired United States Army brigadier general and applied mathematician. He is Professor Emeritus at the United States Military Academy (USMA), where he served as the Head of the Department of Mathematical Sciences and the Director of the Network Science Center. He is known for his work in numerical solutions of differential equations, number theory, network science, artificial intelligence, complexity science, and cooperative systems.

== Early life and education ==
Arney grew up in Sodus Point, New York, where he became a licensed commercial fisherman on Lake Ontario at the age of eight, following a family tradition. He ended his fishing career to attend the United States Military Academy in 1967.

He graduated from USMA with a Bachelor of Science in Engineering in 1971. During his military career, he earned three graduate degrees from Rensselaer Polytechnic Institute: a Master of Science in Mathematics (1980), a Master of Science in Computer Science (1982), and a Ph.D. in Mathematics (1985).

== Military career ==
Arney served in various Army assignments, including at Schofield Barracks, Hawaii; Fort Huachuca, Arizona; and Fort Bragg, North Carolina. While at Fort Bragg, he led the programming division of the Intelligence Data Handling System, which pioneered the use of relational databases and field computers during Exercise Bold Eagle '76 at Fort Irwin, California.

He served as a professor and later as Head of the Department of Mathematical Sciences at the United States Military Academy from 1994 to 2001. He retired from active duty in March 2001 with the rank of brigadier general after 30 years of service.

== Academic and research career ==
Following his military retirement, Arney served as Dean of the School of Mathematics and Sciences and later as Acting Vice President for Academic Affairs at The College of Saint Rose in Albany, New York (2001–2004). From 2004 to 2009, he was a program manager and division chief for the Mathematical Sciences Division and the Network Sciences Division (acting) in the Information Sciences Directorate at the Army Research Office (ARO).

He is Professor Emeritus of Mathematics at the United States Military Academy (since 2009) and has held adjunct positions at Excelsior College and the State University of New York at Oswego.

Arney's early work on adaptive mesh methods for partial differential equations contributed to computational fluid dynamics and aircraft design. In number theory, he collaborated with Joseph Arkin and Paul Erdős on generalizations of earlier results, which gave him an Erdős number of 1. Later, as a program director at ARO, he worked on natural language processing, collective intelligence, and cooperative systems.

He was involved in the creation of the Mathematical Contest in Modeling (MCM) and the Interdisciplinary Contest in Modeling (ICM) by the Consortium for Mathematics and Its Applications (COMAP) starting in 1985. He served as founding director of the ICM, director of the International Mathematics Modeling Challenge, and assistant director of the MCM for over 30 years.

He was a book review editor for the Journal of Mathematics and Computer Education and contributed as a problem solver and editor for the UMAP Journal, Journal of Recreational Mathematics, and Fibonacci Quarterly.

== Awards and recognition ==
- Carol Crawford Distinguished Teaching Award, Metropolitan New York Section of the Mathematical Association of America (2000)
- Dean's Excellence in Teaching Award, United States Military Academy (2018)
- Douglas Faires Award, Consortium for Mathematics and Its Applications (2019)
- The Best Writing on Mathematics 2018 recognition
- Best Presentation Award, Army Science Conference (2008)

A research award for collaboration between West Point cadets and the Army Research Laboratory was named the BG (Ret.) Chris Arney Army Research Laboratory Research Excellence Award in his honor.

== Selected publications ==
- Arney, C.; Albree, J.; Rickey, F. (2000). A Station Favorable to the Pursuits of Science: Primary Materials in the History of Mathematics at the United States Military Academy. History of Mathematics Series, Vol. 18. American Mathematical Society. ISBN 0-8218-2059-1.
- Arney, C.; Giordano, F.; Robertson, J. (2002). Discrete Dynamical Systems: Mathematics, Methods, and Models. McGraw-Hill.
- Arney, C. (co-author) (1993). Principles and Practice of Mathematics. Springer-Verlag. (Also published as The Foundation: A New Start for College Mathematics; edited by Walter Meyer, COMAP).
- Arney, C. (2019). Noncomplexity: The Warrior's Way. Army Cyber Institute.
- Arney, C. (2021). Dialogues Concerning Science, Technology, and Intellect. Cambridge Scholars Publishing.
