= Arnold of Manchester =

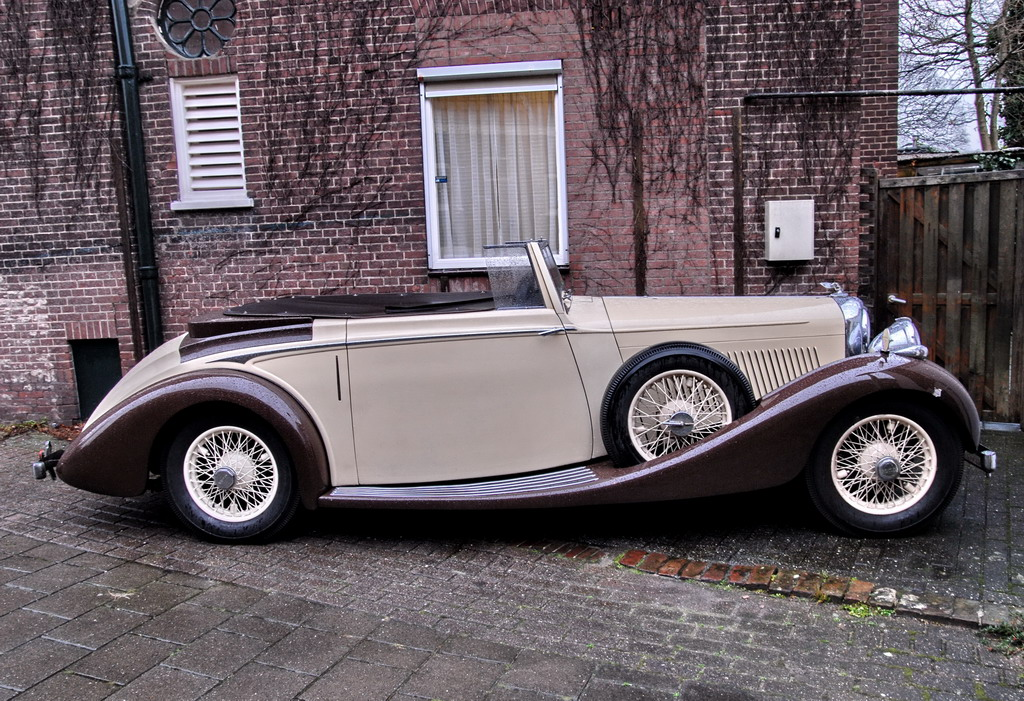
Drophead coupé 1937 on a 4¼ Litre Bentley chassis

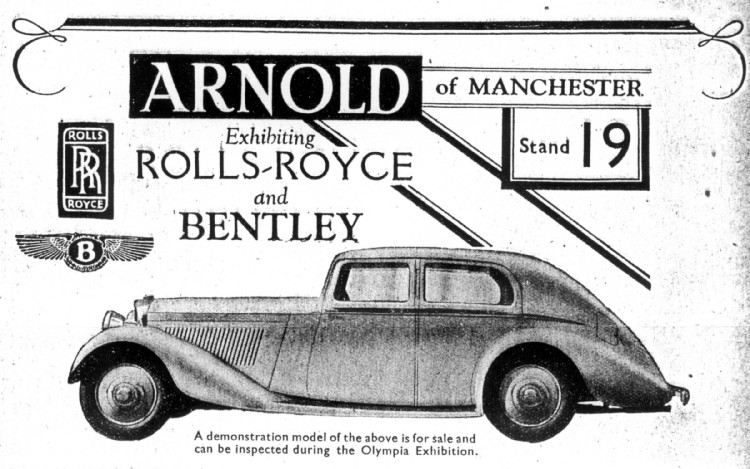
Advertisement by Arnold of Manchester (1935)

Arnold of Manchester, William Arnold (Manchester) Limited owned the Arnold of Manchester coachbuilding business in Chorlton-cum-Medlock, Manchester. Arnold's began making car bodies in 1910 and between the wars built many bodies for famous brands of car. They also built motor coaches. They tried their hand at bus bodies, both single-deck and double-deck between 1928 and 1931. War ended production. After the Second World War they remained car sales and service agents.

In the 1920s and 1930s they were agents for:

Buick, Durant, Essex, Hudson
Lancia
Daimler, Bentley (Cricklewood and Derby), Sunbeam, Jowett

William Arnold were distributors of: Hispano-Suiza (north of England) and Lanchester, Farman and Delaunay-Belleville (in Manchester)

After the Second World War William Arnold built taxis and other commercial bodies but no more luxury coachwork. American cars no longer sold in any quantity and the principals of their other agencies went out of business. They became Morris dealers. In 1953 they were appointed Volkswagen-Audi main dealers in the North-west but, barely profitable, sold that agency in 1980. The company was dissolved in 1985.

William Arnold, Coachcraft specialist. Telegrams Luxurious

- Works — 101-115 Upper Brook Street, Chorlton-cum-Medlock, Manchester 13
- Showroom — 24-26 St Ann's Square in central Manchester
