= Democritus (crater) =

Crater on the Moon

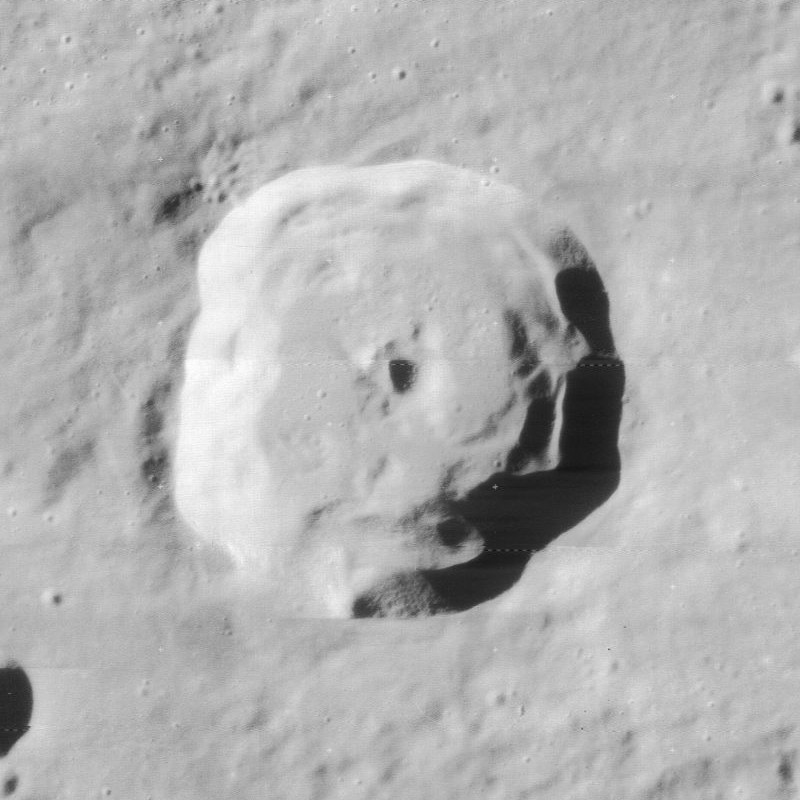
- Lunar Orbiter 4 image
- Coordinates: 62.3°N 35.0°E
- Diameter: 37.78 km (23.48 mi)
- Depth: 2.0 km (1.2 mi)
- Colongitude: 325° at sunrise
- Eponym: Democritus

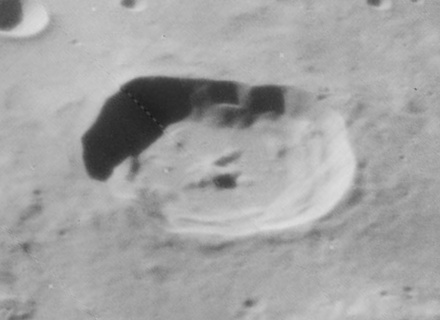
Oblique view from Lunar Orbiter 4

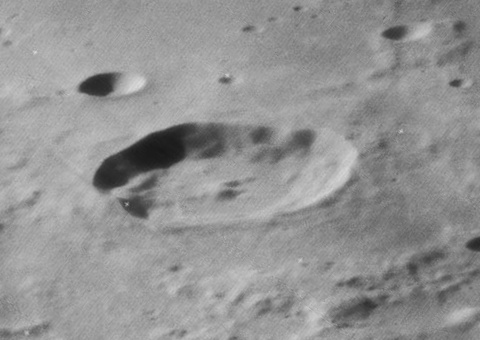
Oblique view also from Lunar Orbiter 4

Democritus is a lunar impact crater that is located on the northern part of the Moon, just to the north of the Mare Frigoris. T. W. Webb described it as "a deep ring-plain". Just to the south of Democritus is the lava-flooded crater Gärtner, which forms a bay on the mare. Directly to the north is Arnold, another flooded formation.

The rim of Democritus is generally sharp-edged and shows little sign of erosion. It forms not quite a circle, with outward notch-like bulges that give it a slightly irregular shape. The inner walls have single or double terraces that lead down to a relatively flat interior floor. Near the midpoint of the crater is a small central peak.

This crater is named after the Greek philosopher Democritus (c. 460 – c. 370 BC). Its designation was formally adopted by the International Astronomical Union in 1935. Like many of the craters on the Moon's near side, it was given its name by Giovanni Riccioli, whose 1651 nomenclature system has become standardized. Earlier lunar cartographers had given the feature different names: Michael van Langren's 1645 map calls it "Alfonsi IX Reg. Cast." after Alfonso IX of León and Castile, and Johannes Hevelius called it "Mons Bontas".

== Satellite craters ==
By convention these features are identified on lunar maps by placing the letter on the side of the crater midpoint that is closest to Democritus.

Democritus	Latitude	Longitude	Diameter
A	61.6° N	32.4° E	11 km
B	60.1° N	28.6° E	12 km
D	62.9° N	31.2° E	8 km
K	63.1° N	40.7° E	7 km
L	63.4° N	39.7° E	18 km
M	63.6° N	37.1° E	5 km
N	63.6° N	34.3° E	16 km

The satellite features B includes a permanently shadowed region where the sunlight never reaches.
