= William Frederick Milton Arny =

American government official (1813–1881)

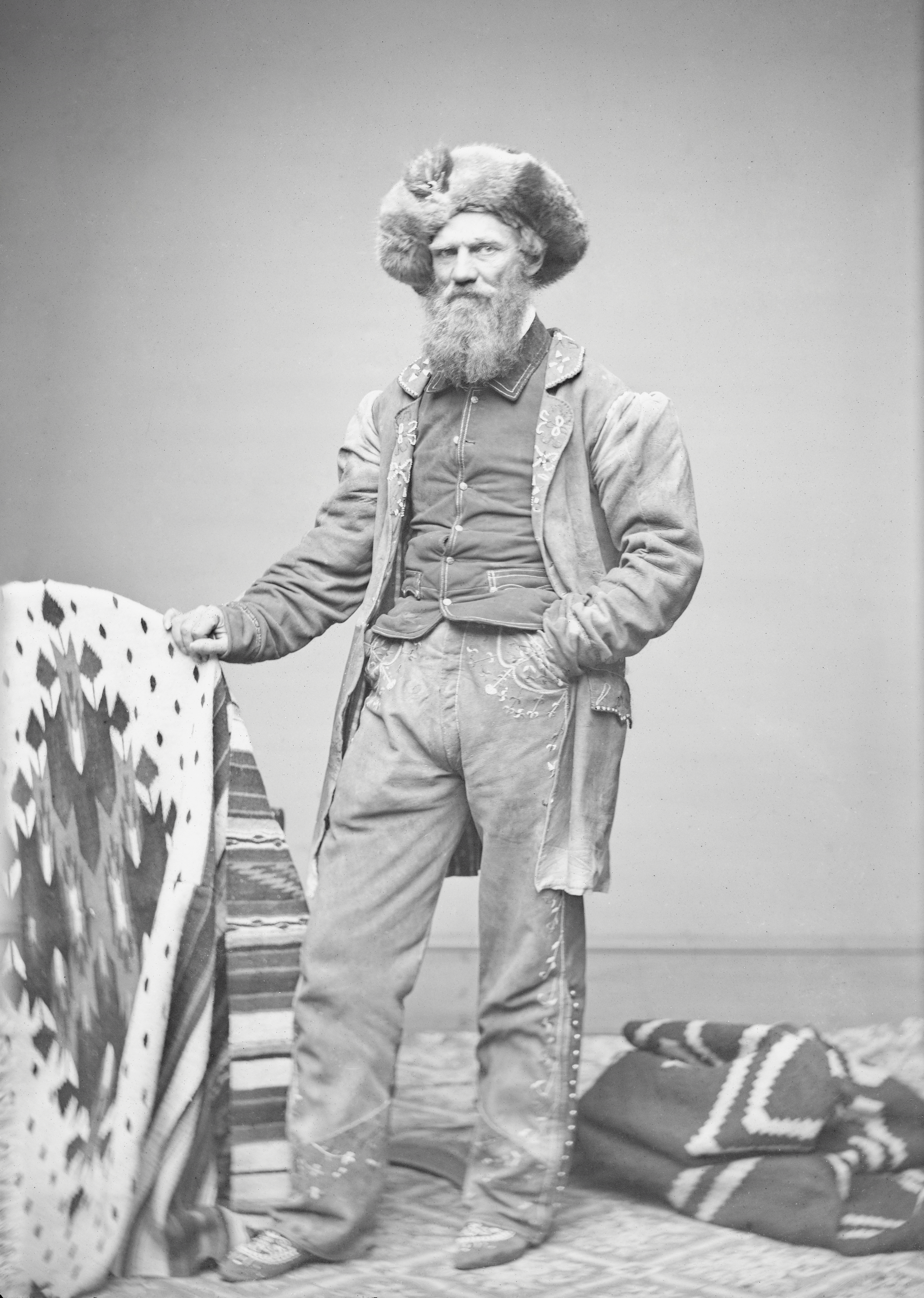
William Frederick Milton Arny by the Mathew Brady Studio, c. 1860-70

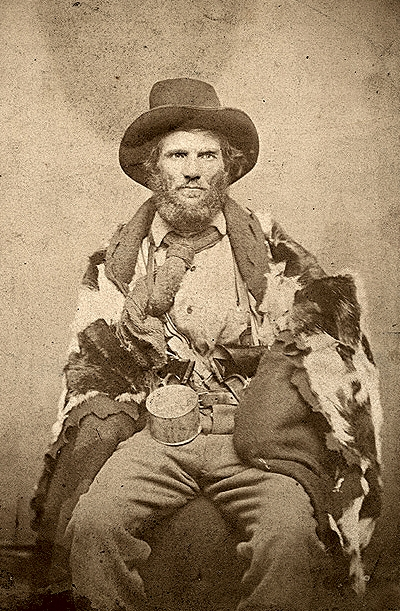
William F. M. Arny, circa 1856

William Frederick Milton Arny (May 9, 1813 – September 18, 1881) was an Indian agent for the United States, who served as Secretary of New Mexico Territory in 1862–1867.

== Biography ==
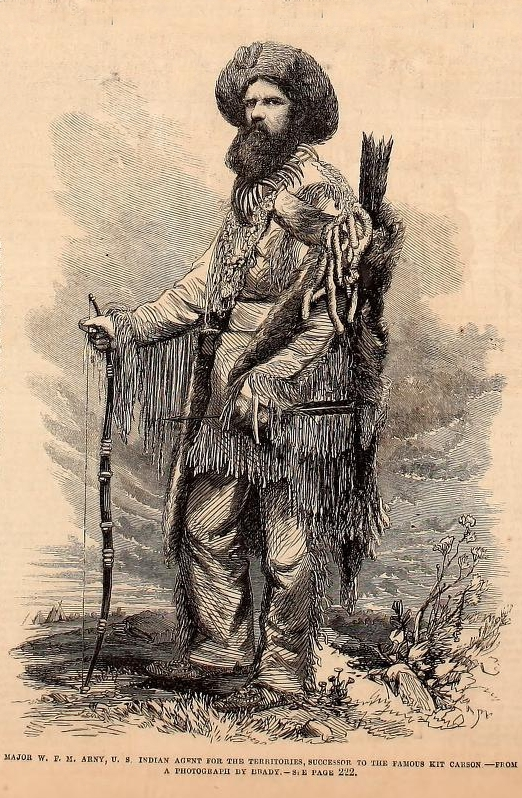
W.F.M. Arny "clad in a full of Indian costume, made of deer, beaver and panther skins", according to the Frank Leslie’s Illustrated Newspaper, July 5, 1862

Arny was born on May 9, 1813, in Georgetown, Washington, D.C., the son of Joseph Arny from Krummenau, St. Gallen, Switzerland, a confectioner, and his first wife, Elizabeth Hyde, who was from England.

He was educated in the public schools and gained employment at the Bethany College, at Bethany, Virginia. He was for several years secretary of Bethany College, when the celebrated preacher, Alexander Campbell was its president. In 1850 Arny removed to McLean County, Illinois after a rift developed between Campbell and him.

He became involved with the anti-slavery movement and later on with the fledgling Illinois Republican Party. He befriended Abraham Lincoln, though Lincoln declined in 1856 his offer to join the anti-slavery National Kansas Committee, where Arny was active.

Arny delivered aid to Kansas during the Bleeding Kansas crisis. He also helped to establish a town of Hyatt in Kansas, now Garnett. He decided to move from Illinois to Kansas in 1857 and settled at Hyatt where he was elected both a mayor and county judge.

He worked as the general agent for the National Kansas Committee and was in charge of distributing aid collected in the East to Free Staters in the southern Kansas. Together with Samuel C. Pomeroy, who was responsible for the northern Kansas, they distributed over 8 million pounds of provision and $85,000 in cash. Arny also served as a delegate to the Leavenworth Constitutional Convention and was a member of the 1858 Kansas Territorial legislature, as well as the Topeka legislature

He moved to New Mexico after he was appointed United States Indian agent for the Utes and Jicarilla, Native-American tribes in northern New Mexico, replacing Kit Carson. His appointment was confirmed by the Senate on July 16, 1861.

In December 1861, Arny made a trip to Washington, D.C. to voice his plans and ideas to the Bureau of Indian Affairs. He visited reception at White House wearing a frontier-type dress and carrying a bow and arrows. He presented Lincoln with a Native American blanket made by a Navajo woman.

In July 1862, President Lincoln made him Secretary of the New Mexico Territory, and he settled at Santa Fe and served in this capacity for the next five years. After Governor Henry Connelly died in July 1866, he served as acting governor for around six months until Robert B. Mitchell arrived.

Upon the expiration of his service in 1867, he was again appointed as an Indian agent of the Utes and Jicarilla in the New Mexico Territory.

In 1873, Arny became an Indian agent for the Navajos serving for several years in this capacity. He quarreled with traders selling at the Navajo reservations being described by his enemies as "the worst agent the Navajos ever had to deal with." In July 1875 he chose to resign.

He represented New Mexico at the Centennial Exposition in 1876 at Philadelphia.

W. F. M. Arny died September 18, 1881, in Topeka, Kansas where he lived for the last five years of his life on a tight budget. A collection was arranged to transport his body to Santa Fe where a funeral service was held.
