= Moigno (crater) =

Crater on the Moon

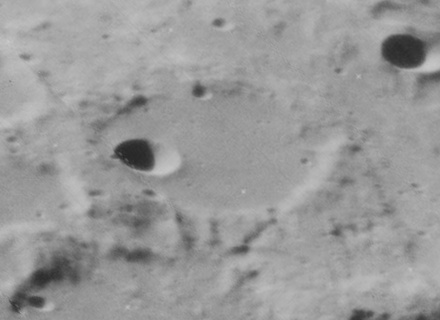
- Oblique Lunar Orbiter 4 image
- Coordinates: 66.4°N 28.9°E
- Diameter: 37 km
- Depth: Unknown
- Colongitude: 337° at sunrise
- Eponym: François N. M. Moigno

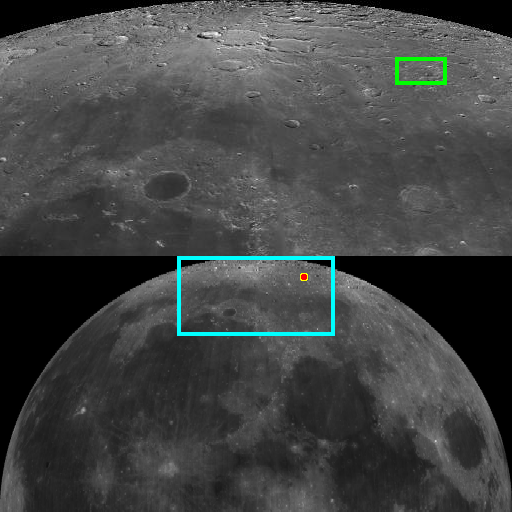
Location of Moigno

Moigno is a lunar impact crater that is located in the northern part of the Moon's near side. It lies just to the west of the crater Arnold, and southeast of Neison. The low rim of this crater is worn and eroded, until it is nearly level with the surrounding terrain. The perimeter is only roughly circular, and there are notches along the inner face of the western side. The interior floor has been resurfaced, leaving a level, nearly featureless plain covering the base of this depression. In the southern end of the floor is the small crater Moigno C.

== Satellite craters ==
By convention these features are identified on lunar maps by placing the letter on the side of the crater midpoint that is closest to Moigno.

Moigno	Latitude	Longitude	Diameter
A	64.8° N	29.7° E	16 km
B	64.6° N	26.1° E	26 km
C	65.9° N	29.0° E	9 km
D	65.2° N	27.7° E	23 km

The satellite feature A includes a permanently shadowed region where the sunlight never reaches.
