= Arnie Arenz =

American football player (1911–1985)

Profile
- Position: Quarterback / Fullback

Personal information
- Born: October 13, 1911; Flat River, Missouri, U.S.
- Died: January 31, 1985 (aged 73); Flat River, Missouri, U.S.
- Listed height: 6 ft 0 in (1.83 m)
- Listed weight: 212 lb (96 kg)

Career information
- College: St. Louis

Career history
- 1934: Boston Redskins
- Stats at Pro Football Reference

Arnold Henry Edwin Arenz (October 13, 1911 – January 31, 1985) was an American football player and a United States Army officer.

== Early life ==
Arenz was born in 1911 in Flat River, Missouri. He attended Central High School in Flat River and then enrolled at St. Louis University. He played college football for the St. Louis Billikens from 1930 to 1933. He was rated by a St. Louis columnist as "the best football player in these parts."

== Professional career ==
Arenz also played professional football in the National Football League (NFL) as a back for the Boston Redskins during the 1934 season. He appeared in three NFL games, making two receptions, completing one pass, and rushing four times. He also played in the American Football League for the St. Louis Blues and Dallas Rams during the 1934 season.

== Personal life ==
Following his football career, Arenz served 20 years in the United States Army, retiring as a lieutenant colonel. After retiring from the Army, he worked as a purchasing agent for Tacoma General Hospital until 1975.
