= Arnold, Minnesota =

Census-designated place in Minnesota, US

- Former CDP and Unincorporated Community
- Interactive map of Arnold, Minnesota
- Location within Minnesota
- Coordinates: 46.8726°N 92.1033°W
- Country: United States
- State: Minnesota
- County: St. Louis
- Discontinued: October 22, 2015

Area
  - Total: 11.613 sq mi (30.078 km^{2})
  - Land: 11.565 sq mi (29.952 km^{2})
  - Water: 0.049 sq mi (0.127 km^{2}) 0.42%
- Elevation: 1,440 ft (440 m)

Population (2010)
  - Total: 2,960
  - Estimate (2015): 3,071
  - Density: 256/sq mi (98.8/km^{2})
- Time zone: UTC–6 (Central (CST))
  - Summer (DST): UTC–5 (CDT)
- ZIP Code: 55803
- Area code: 218
- FIPS code: 27-02260
- GNIS feature ID: 2393319

Arnold is a former census-designated place (CDP), which was located in Rice Lake, St. Louis County, Minnesota, United States. The population was 2,960 as of the 2010 census, and was estimated at 3,071 in 2015. The census-designated place of Arnold was located entirely within the former Rice Lake Township, adjacent to the north side of the city of Duluth. Rice Lake Township was incorporated as the city of Rice Lake on October 22, 2015, thus rendering the census-designated place of Arnold to no longer exist.

The name "Arnold", as a place of residence, had been seldom used in the present day by the younger generations. Since about 1970, those who reside in this area had identified themselves as residents of Rice Lake or Duluth. The CDP name "Arnold" was used only for statistical purposes for the U.S. decennial census count of population.

== Geography ==
According to the United States Census Bureau, the former CDP had an area of 11.613 square miles (30.08 km^{2}), of which 11.564 square miles (29.95 km^{2}) is land and 0.049 square miles (0.13 km^{2}) (0.42%) is water.

== Demographics ==
Historical population
Census	Pop.	Note	%±
1990	2,891		—
2000	3,032		4.9%
2010	2,960		−2.4%
2015 (est.)	3,071		3.8%
U.S. Decennial Census; 2010 Census

As of the 2015 American Community Survey, there were 1,266 estimated households in Arnold with an average of 2.42 persons per household. The CDP has a median household income of $68,458. Approximately 7.9% of the CDP's population lives at or below the poverty line. Arnold has an estimated 70.6% employment rate, with 19.2% of the population holding a bachelor's degree or higher and 95.7% holding a high school diploma. There were 1,384 housing units at an average density of 119.68 per square mile (46.21/km^{2}).

The median age in the CDP was 44.0 years.

Arnold, Minnesota – racial and ethnic composition Note: the US Census treats Hispanic/Latino as an ethnic category. This table excludes Latinos from the racial categories and assigns them to a separate category. Hispanics/Latinos may be of any race.
Race / ethnicity (NH = non-Hispanic)
Race / ethnicity (NH = non-Hispanic)	Population 1990		Population 2000		Population 2010	
Race / ethnicity (NH = non-Hispanic)	Number	Percent	Number	Percent	Number	Percent
White alone (NH)	2,828	97.82%	2,958	97.56%	2,836	95.81%
Black or African American alone (NH)	13	0.45%	11	0.36%	17	0.57%
Native American or Alaska Native alone (NH)	31	1.07%	17	0.56%	31	1.05%
Asian alone (NH)	14	0.48%	7	0.23%	13	0.44%
Pacific Islander alone (NH)	×	×	2	0.07%	1	0.03%
Other race alone (NH)	0	0.00%	0	0.00%	7	0.24%
Mixed race or multiracial (NH)	×	×	27	0.89%	35	1.18%
Hispanic or Latino (any race)	5	0.17%	10	0.33%	20	0.68%
Total	2,891	100.00%	3,032	100.00%	2,960	100.00%

=== 2010 census ===
As of the 2010 census, there were 2,960 people, 1,169 households, and 835 families residing in the CDP. The population density was 256.50 inhabitants per square mile (99.04/km^{2}). There were 1,226 housing units at an average density of 106.24 per square mile (41.02/km^{2}). The racial makeup of the CDP was 96.39% White, 0.57% African American, 1.05% Native American, 0.44% Asian, 0.03% Pacific Islander, 0.30% from some other races and 1.22% from two or more races. Hispanic or Latino people of any race were 0.68% of the population.

=== 2000 census ===
As of the 2000 census, there were 3,032 people, 1,108 households, and 850 families residing in the CDP. The population density was 262.22 inhabitants per square mile (101.24/km^{2}). There were 1,123 housing units at an average density of 97.12 per square mile (37.50/km^{2}). The racial makeup of the CDP was 97.86% White, 0.36% African American, 0.56% Native American, 0.23% Asian, 0.07% Pacific Islander, 0.03% from some other races and 0.89% from two or more races. Hispanic or Latino people of any race were 0.33% of the population.

20.4% were of Norwegian, 19.3% German, 12.5% Swedish, 7.9% Polish, 6.7% Finnish and 5.4% English ancestry.

There were 1,108 households, out of which 36.7% had children under the age of 18 living with them, 66.2% were married couples living together, 6.8% had a female householder with no husband present, and 23.2% were non-families. 18.7% of all households were made up of individuals, and 6.1% had someone living alone who was 65 years of age or older. The average household size was 2.73 and the average family size was 3.11.

In the CDP the population was spread out, with 27.4% under the age of 18, 6.9% from 18 to 24, 31.1% from 25 to 44, 23.8% from 45 to 64, and 10.8% who were 65 years of age or older. The median age was 38 years. For every 100 females, there were 101.5 males. For every 100 females age 18 and over, there were 104.7 males.

The median income for a household in the CDP was $46,111, and the median income for a family was $53,194. Males had a median income of $40,281 versus $28,397 for females. The per capita income for the CDP was $18,104. About 5.5% of families and 5.2% of the population were below the poverty line, including 3.6% of those under age 18 and 6.5% of those age 65 or over.

== See also ==
- City of Rice Lake
