= Christoph Arnold =

German astronomer

- Born: 17 December 1650; Leipzig
- Died: 15 April 1695 (aged 44); Leipzig
- Known for: Amateur astronomer

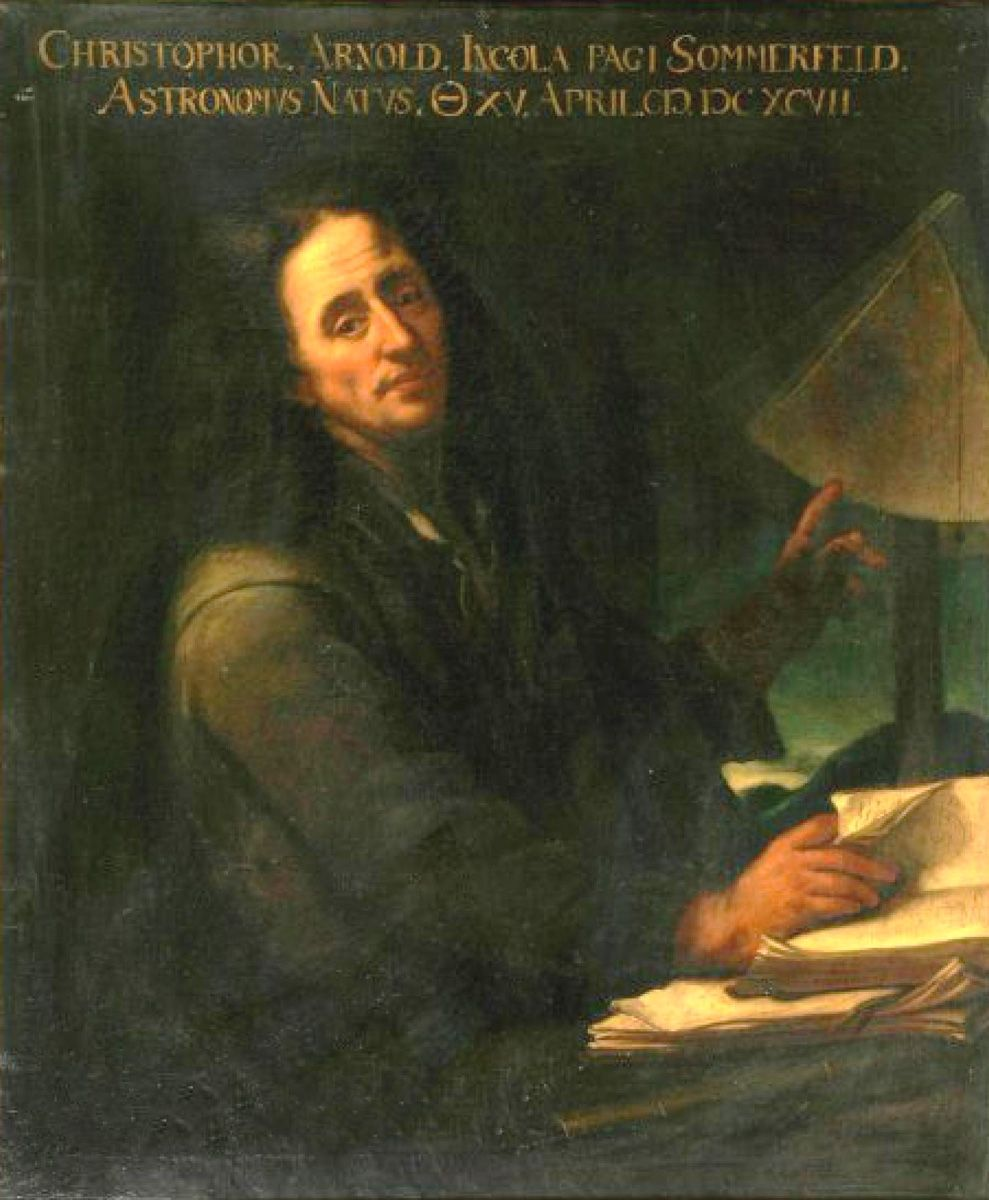
Christoph Arnold (1650–1695)

Christoph Arnold (17 December 1650 – 15 April 1695) was a German farmer and amateur astronomer.

== Life ==
Born in Sommerfeld near Leipzig, Arnold was a farmer by profession. Interested in astronomy, he spotted the great comet of 1683, eight days before Hevelius did. He also observed the great comet of 1686. In 1686, Kirch went to Leipzig. There, he observed the great comet of 1686, together with Gottfried Kirch. There, Kirch met his second wife, Maria Margarethe Winckelmann (1670–1720), who had actually learned astronomy from Arnold.

Arnold observed the transit of Mercury in front of the sun on 13 October 1690. For this work, he received some money and a tax exemption from the town of Leipzig. He was the author of Göttliche Gnadenzeichen, in einem Sonnenwunder vor Augen gestellt (Leipzig, 1692) which contains an account of the transit of Mercury in 1690. He died at Leipzig.

== Honors ==
Lunar crater Arnold and asteroid 121016 Christopharnold were named in his honor. The asteroid's official naming citation was published by the Minor Planet Center on 29 October 2012 (M.P.C. 81070).
