= Richard Arnold (judge) =

British judge

The Right Honourable Lord Justice Arnold
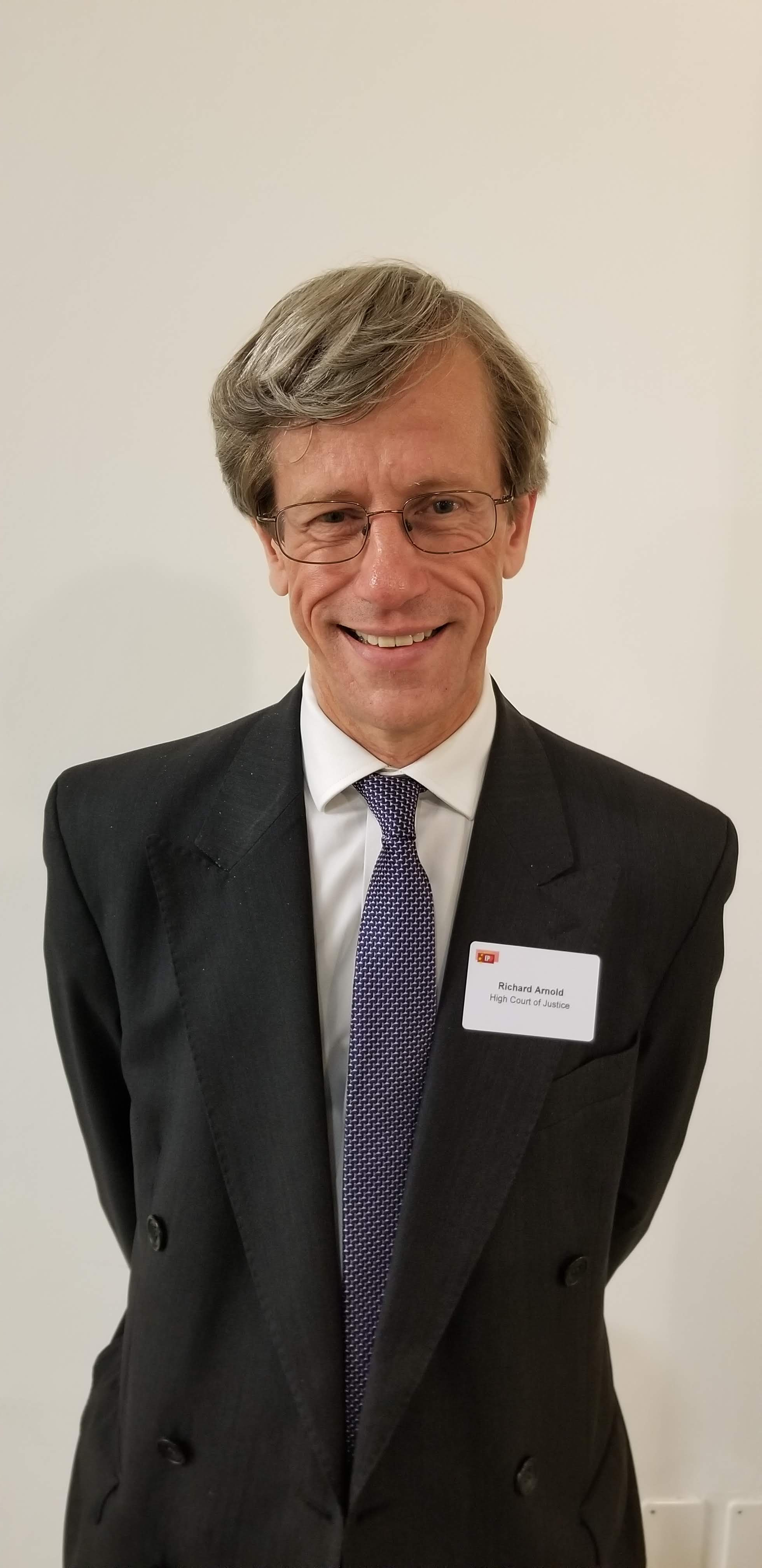
- Sir Richard Arnold at the European Policy for Intellectual Property Conference 2019, ETH Zurich

Lord Justice of Appeal
- Incumbent
- Assumed office 1 October 2019

Justice of the High Court
- In office 1 October 2008 – 30 September 2019

Personal details
- Born: Richard David Arnold; 23 June 1961 (age 65)
- Education: Magdalen College, Oxford; University of Westminster
- Occupation: Judge
- Profession: Law

Sir Richard David Arnold (born 23 June 1961) styled the Rt Hon Lord Justice Arnold is a Judge of the Court of Appeal of England and Wales.

== Education and career ==
Arnold was educated at Highgate School and Magdalen College, Oxford, before gaining a diploma in law from the University of Westminster.

He was called to the bar in 1985 and made a silk in 2000. He was appointed to the High Court Chancery Division in 2008, becoming the judge in charge of the Patent Court in April 2013. In 2011, he criticized copyright law as "incoherent." In 2016, he ruled that Nestle could not trademark KitKat Candy bars' shape.

He was appointed to the Court of Appeal, effective 1 October 2019. In 2024, Arnold ruled that Lenovo has to pay additional licence fees to InterDigital. In 2025, Arnold concurred with a denying Tesla Motors a licence.

== See also ==
- List of High Court judges of England and Wales
