= Neison (crater) =

Crater on the Moon

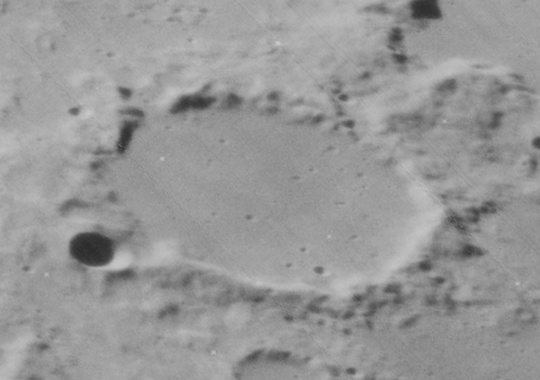
- Oblique Lunar Orbiter 4 image
- Coordinates: 68.3°N 25.1°E
- Diameter: 53 km
- Depth: Unknown
- Colongitude: 338° at sunrise
- Eponym: Edmund N. Neison

Neison is a lunar impact crater that lies to the south of the crater Meton, in the northern part of the Moon. The high latitude of this crater means that the crater appears foreshortened when viewed from the Earth, having an elliptical appearance even though it is nearly circular in shape.

The outer rim of this crater has been heavily worn and eroded by smaller impacts, leaving only a low, uneven ridge surrounding the interior. There are several breaks in this rim, and the inner edge is notched by impacts. The interior has been resurfaced, covering the floor of many of these peripheral impacts. The result is a level plain within the shallow rim, with clefts to the southwest, southeast, and east-northeast. Only a few tiny craterlets mark this otherwise featureless floor.

== Satellite craters ==
By convention these features are identified on lunar maps by placing the letter on the side of the crater midpoint that is closest to Neison.

Neison	Latitude	Longitude	Diameter
A	67.4° N	26.7° E	9 km
B	67.4° N	25.9° E	8 km
C	67.0° N	23.2° E	9 km
D	68.0° N	22.6° E	6 km
