= Arnie (video game) =

1992 video game

- Developer: Realms of Fantasy
- Publisher: Zeppelin Games Limited
- Platforms: Amiga, Commodore 64
- Release: 1992
- Genre: Action
- Mode: Single-player

Arnie is a 1992 action game developed by Realms of Fantasy and published by Zeppelin Games. The plot concerns a lone soldier who must fight through army camps.

== Gameplay ==
The game opens as Arnie is airlifted into a forest with cabins full of enemy soldiers. At the start of the game he is equipped with an Armalite AR-15 rifle. Tanks, helicopters, and other military artillery also attempt to kill Arnie. Defeating enemy soldiers earns the player more powerful weapons, making the later parts of the game easier. These do have limited ammunition, however. The object of the game is to reach the dictator's HQ and defeat him.

== Development ==
The game was available on various Commodore formats. It was also issued as a demo tape by Commodore magazine. Zeppelin released the sequel, Arnie II, in 1993. Although it is obvious that the game's name alludes to Arnold Schwarzenegger, Arnie is not a licensed title and is not based on any movie.

== Reception ==
Amiga Joker noted that "you rarely get so much murder & manslaughter for so little money". Polish Amiga Portal was not impressed with the game's performance or playability. Amiga Format argued that this type of game had been done many times in the past, and better than this title. The game was also featured in other contemporary magazines.
