= Arnold (crater) =

Lunar impact crater

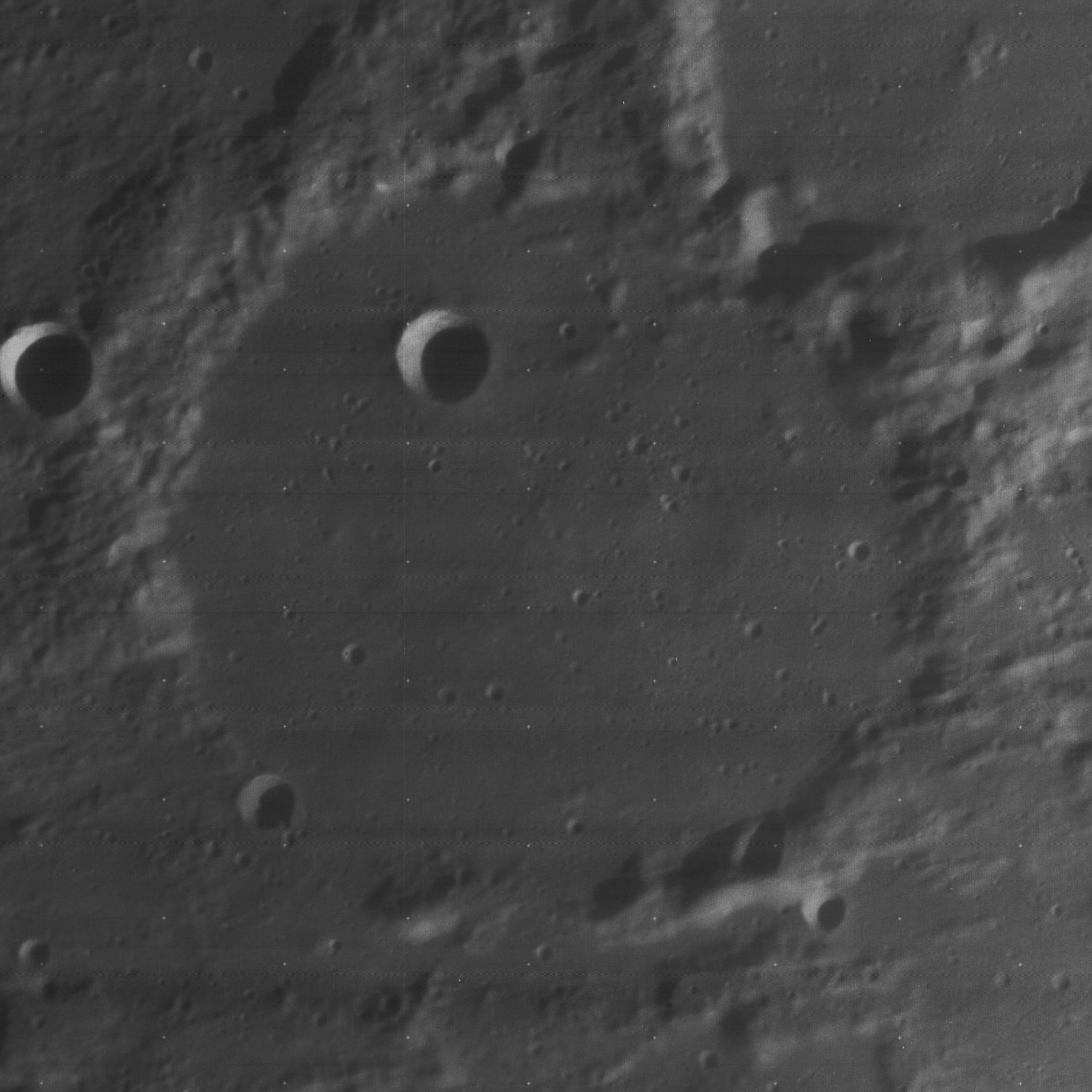
- Lunar Orbiter 4 image of Arnold, with Arnold A on the far left, and Arnold F inside its rim
- Coordinates: 66.8°N 35.9°E
- Diameter: 93.13 km (57.87 mi)
- Depth: 2.0 km (1.2 mi)
- Colongitude: 325° at sunrise
- Formation: Late Imbrian
- Eponym: Christoph Arnold

Arnold is a lunar impact crater that is located in the north-northeastern part of the visible Moon, near the lunar limb. This location gives the crater a notably oval appearance due to foreshortening, although the formation is actually relatively round. It lies to the northeast of the Mare Frigoris, to the north of the crater Democritus. West of Arnold is the smaller crater Moigno.

The ancient rim of Arnold has been worn and rounded by ages of subsequent bombardment. Patrick Moore called the crater "rather low-walled and obscure". It dates to the Late Imbrian period on the lunar geologic timescale. There is a gap in the wall to the southwest, marked by the tiny crater Arnold J, and the wall is relatively low along the eastern edge. The northern half of the rim is the most intact, particularly to the northeast where is joins the satellite crater Arnold A.

The inner floor of Arnold crater has been resurfaced, presumably by lava, and is relatively flat except for a number of tiny craterlets. The most notable crater in the interior is Arnold F, in the northwest section. If the crater once possessed a central peak, no sign of this feature now remains.

This crater is named after German astronomer Christoph Arnold (1650-1695). Its designation was officially adopted by the International Astronomical Union in 1935. The name was introduced into lunar nomenclature by German astronomer J. H. Schröter in 1791.

== Satellite craters ==
By convention these features are identified on lunar maps by placing the letter on the side of the crater midpoint that is closest to Arnold.

Arnold	Latitude	Longitude	Diameter
A	68.8° N	39.8° E	57 km
E	71.6° N	38.3° E	32 km
F	67.5° N	35.2° E	10 km
G	67.3° N	31.4° E	11 km
H	72.6° N	45.3° E	13 km
J	65.9° N	33.7° E	6 km
K	70.8° N	42.8° E	29 km
L	70.2° N	36.1° E	33 km
M	68.3° N	43.6° E	7 km
N	70.2° N	41.9° E	18 km

== Gallery ==
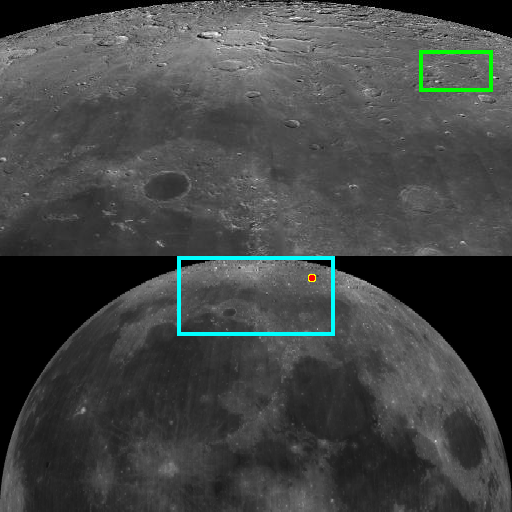
Location of Arnold

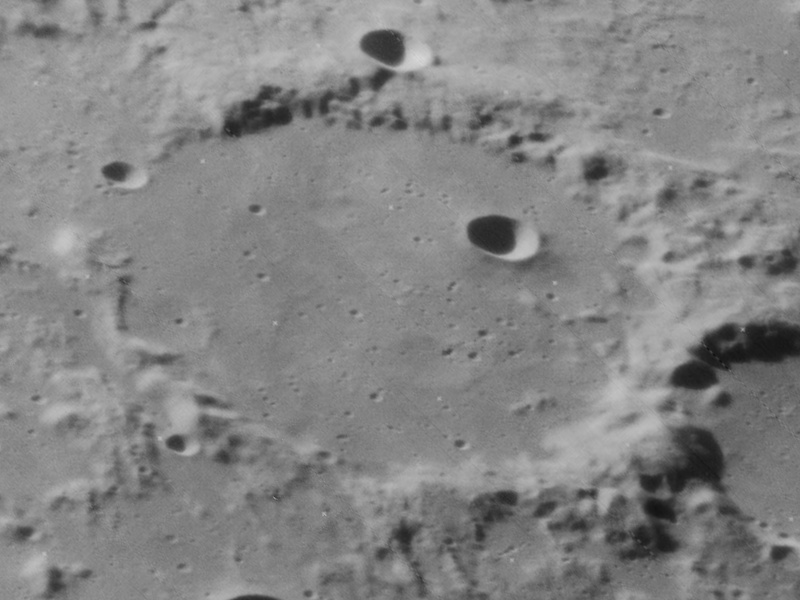
Oblique view from Lunar Orbiter 4

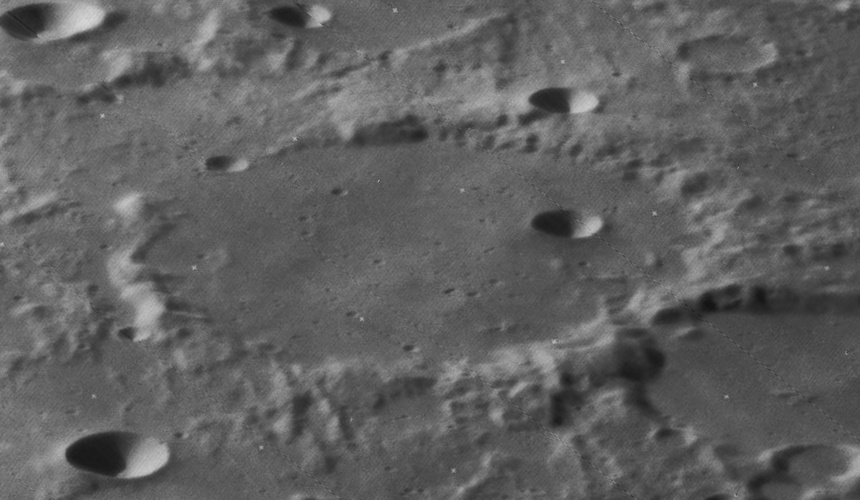
Oblique view also from Lunar Orbiter 4
