= Arnie 2 =

1993 video game

- Developer: Zeppelin Games
- Publisher: Zeppelin Games
- Platforms: Amiga, Commodore 64, MS-DOS
- Release: 1993
- Genre: Action

Arnie 2, developed by Zeppelin Games, is an action video game released in 1993 for the Amiga, Commodore 64, and MS-DOS. It is the sequel to Arnie. The game was written by David Sowerby with graphics by Neil Hislop, and the music was created by Andrew Rodger. The game's manual says that "Arnie has been chosen to perform four missions that require stealth, skill and extreme violence."

Although the game's name alludes to Arnold Schwarzenegger, Arnie 2 is not a licensed title and is not based on any movie.

== Gameplay ==
The muscleman shoots and bombs his way through four enemy-infested territories:

1. Shutting down a chemical plant by blowing up enough pipeline valves.
2. Clearing an airfield of enemy soldiers, tanks and helicopters.
3. Climbing from battleship to battleship in a hostile harbour.
4. Rescuing as many prisoners as possible from a jungle POW camp.

There are enemies on every level, from simple infantry armed with rifles, mortars or rocket launchers to machine team teams, missile batteries and tanks. Most of the opponents are stationary and stolidly fire in a single direction; however, foxholes release cannon-fodder at a constant rate.

To destroy such nests or to efficiently dispatch groups of soldiers, Arnie has a limited supply of grenades. Some dead foes drop more powerful weapons as well as invaluable first aid kits and extra lives.

== Reception ==
Commodore Force thought this was a disappointing sequel, criticising the poorly implemented isometric perspective and weak enemy AI. It received a score of 57%.
